= Antoon Leenaars =

Canadian psychologist

Antoon A. Leenaars (born 1951) is a Canadian clinical and forensic psychologist practicing in Windsor, Ontario. He is known for his research on suicide.

== Career ==
Leenaars wrote a book about suicide in the military, which he has called a growing problem. He has also dismissed the claim, often made by Canadian politicians, that the country's military has a lower suicide rate than the general population, a claim he describes as "whitewashing". Subsequent research by the Canadian Forces themselves supported Leenaars' claim.

In April 2016, "Key Findings from 2013 Canadian Forces Mental Health Survey" was published in a peer-reviewed journal, The Canadian Journal of Psychiatry. Not only suicide, but suicidal attempts, and suicidal ideation were found to be high (above the general population), as were PTSD, anxiety, depression, and other costs of service.

After Kelly Johnson, a police officer from London, Ontario, shot and killed a retiree and then killed herself, London's police department hired Leenaars to investigate the homicide-suicide, and he subsequently wrote a book about suicide and murder-suicide among police. The book, Suicide and Homicide-Suicide Among Police, was published in 2010.

Leenaars has continued his work in suicide prevention among police and other high risk groups (e.g., military personnel, Indigenous populations); he was among four experts invited to the critical issues in policing series "An Occupational Risk: What every police agency should do to prevent suicide among its officers", hosted by the NYPD-HQ and Police Executive Research Forum.

His most recent book on death scene investigations), whether a death is natural, accident, suicide or homicide (NASH), is entitled The Psychological Autopsy (2017).

== Honors, awards, and positions ==
Leenaars is the former president of the Canadian Association for Suicide Prevention (CASP) and the American Association of Suicidology (AAS) (of which he is the only non-American to be president). He was the founding editor-in-chief of the peer-reviewed journal Archives of Suicide Research. He has received, among other awards, the International Association for Suicide Prevention's Stengel Award, CASP's Research Award, and AAS's Shneidman Award.
