= David Lester (psychologist) =

British-American psychologist

- Born: 1 June 1942 (age 84); London, England
- Education: Cambridge University, Brandeis University
- Spouse: Bijou Yang
- Awards: 1997 Dublin Award from the American Association of Suicidology
- Scientific career
- Fields: Psychology, suicidology
- Workplaces: Stockton University
- Thesis: Suicidal behaviour: aggression or hostility in social relationships? (1968)
- Website: drdavidlester.net

David Lester is a British-American psychologist, suicidologist, and emeritus professor of psychology at Stockton University.

== Education ==
Lester received his BA from Cambridge University in 1964, and his M.A. from Brandeis University in psychology in 1966. He went on to receive another M.A. from Cambridge University in 1968, and received his first PhD the same year at Brandeis. In 1991, he received his second PhD, this one in social & political science at Cambridge.

== Career ==
Lester served as an assistant professor of psychology at Wellesley College from 1967 to 1969. From 1969 to 1971, he was Director of Research and Evaluation at the Suicide Prevention and Crisis Service in Buffalo, NY. In 1971, he joined the faculty at Stockton University, which opened that year, as a psychology professor and head of the psychology program, and later became a distinguished professor there in 2008. At Stockton, he founded the Psychology and Criminal Justice programs. In 2015, he retired from Stockton, whereupon he became an emeritus professor there.

== Research ==
Lester is known for researching suicide, and has been called "the world's pre-eminent suicide researcher." As of 2018, he has published over 100 books and 2,650 papers on this subject. His research has been published in at least 158 American journals and 47 foreign journals, with 74 colleagues in 34 countries. His work on suicide has focused on (1) crisis intervention by telephone, (2) preventing suicide by restricting access to the means for suicide, (3) studies of the diaries left by suicides, (4) suicide in the oppressed, including African slaves, Native Americans, Holocaust victims, the Roma, and prisoners, (5) reviews of research on and theory concerning suicide from 1897 to 1997, and (6) innovative ideas including suicide as a dramatic act, suicide and culture, and suicide and the creative arts. Lester has also published books and articles on comparative psychology in his early years, a subself theory of personality in recent years, the fear of death, mass and serial murder, life-after-death, and the death penalty.

== Professional activities ==
Lester was the president for the International Association for Suicide Prevention for 1991–1995.

== Recognition ==
Lester received the American Association of Suicidology's Dublin Award in 1997, and Stockton University opened the David Lester Lending Library in his honor in 2015.

== Personal life ==
Lester is married to Bijou Yang, who was a professor of economics at Drexel University.
