= Suicide intervention =

Efforts to prevent a person from suicide

Suicide intervention is a direct effort to prevent a person or persons from attempting suicide.

Asking direct questions is a recommended first step in intervention. These questions may include asking about whether a person is having thoughts of suicide, if they have thought about how they would do it, if they have access to the means to carry out their plan, and if they have a timeframe in mind. Asking these questions builds connection, a key protective factor in preventing suicide. These questions also enable all parties to establish a better understanding of risk. Research shows that asking direct questions about suicide does not increase suicidal ideation, and may decrease it.

Most countries have some form of mental health legislation which allows people expressing suicidal thoughts or intent to be detained involuntarily for psychiatric treatment when their judgment is deemed to be impaired. These laws may grant the courts, police, or a medical doctor the power to order an individual to be apprehended to hospital for treatment. This is sometimes referred to as being committed. The review of ongoing involuntary treatment may be conducted by the hospital, the courts, or a quasi-judicial body, depending on the jurisdiction. Legislation normally requires police or court authorities to bring the individual to a hospital for treatment as soon as possible, and not to hold them in locations such as a police station.

Mental health professionals and some other health professionals receive training in assessment and treatment of suicidality. Suicide hotlines are widely available for people seeking help. However, some people may be reluctant to discuss their suicidal thoughts, due to stigma, previous negative experiences, fear of detainment, or other reasons.

== First aid for suicidal ideation ==
Crisis hotlines, such as the National Suicide Prevention Lifeline, enable people to get immediate emergency telephone counselling

A number of myths about suicide exist, for instance that it is usually unpredictable. In 75–80% of cases, the suicidal person has given some sort of warning sign.

Another myth states that talking to someone about suicide increases the risk of suicide. This is false. Individuals expressing suicidal thoughts should be encouraged to seek mental health treatment. Friends and family can provide supportive listening, empathy, and encouragement to develop a safety plan. Serious warning signs of imminent suicidal risk include an expressed intent to commit suicide and a specific plan with access to lethal means. If a person expresses these warning signs, emergency services should be contacted immediately.

Another myth is if someone is speaking of committing suicide, that they are merely seeking attention. It is important that the person feel they are taken seriously.

Safety plans can include sources of support, self-soothing activities, reasons for living (such as commitment to family or pets), safe people to call and safe places to go. When a person is feeling acutely distressed and overwhelmed by suicidal thoughts, it can be helpful to refer back to the safety plan or call a suicide helpline if the safety plan can not be done at that moment.

== Mental health treatment ==
Comprehensive approaches to suicidality include stabilization and safety, assessment of risk factors, and ongoing management and problem-solving around minimizing risk factors and bolstering protective factors. During the acute phase, admission to a psychiatric ward or involuntary commitment may be used in an attempt to ensure client safety, but the least restrictive means possible should be used. Treatment focuses on reducing suffering and enhancing coping skills, and involves treatment of any underlying illness.

DSM-5 axis I disorders, particularly major depressive disorder, and axis II disorders, particularly borderline personality disorder, increase the risk of suicide. Individuals with co-occurring mental illness and substance use disorders are at increased risk compared to individuals with just one of the two disorders.

=== Antidepressants ===
While antidepressants may not directly decrease suicide risk in adults, they are in many cases effective at treating major depressive disorder, and as such are recommended for patients with depression.

=== Lithium ===
Lithium is proven to significantly reduce the risk of suicide in mood disorders by 87% in randomized double-blind placebo-controlled trials. Lithium has been shown to reduce the risk of suicide in people with bipolar disorder or major depression to close to the same level as that of the general population. It is thought to exert this effect by treating the underlying mood disorder and through a reduction in impulsivity and aggressiveness. In addition to its effects on suicide, lithium lowers the risk of death from all causes in people with mood disorders. The presence of trace amounts of lithium in drinking water is correlated with lower suicide rates.

=== Electroconvulsive therapy ===
Electroconvulsive therapy (ECT), or shock therapy, rapidly decreases suicidal thinking. The choice of treatment approach is based on the patient's presenting symptoms and history. In cases where a patient is actively attempting suicide even while in a hospital ward, a fast-acting treatment such as ECT may be first-line.

=== Psychotherapy ===
Psychotherapy, particularly cognitive behavioural therapy, is an important component in the management of suicide risk. According to a 2005 randomized controlled trial by Gregory Brown, Aaron Beck and others, cognitive therapy can reduce repeat suicide attempts by 50%.

=== Cultural aspects ===
Ideally, families are involved in the ongoing support of the suicidal individual, and they can help to strengthen protective factors and problem-solve around risk factors. Both families and the suicidal person should be supported by health care providers to cope with the societal stigma surrounding mental illness and suicide.

Attention should also be given to the suicidal person's cultural background, as this can aid in understanding protective factors and problem-solving approaches. Risk factors may also arise related to membership in an oppressed minority group. For instance, Aboriginal people may benefit from traditional Aboriginal healing techniques that facilitate a change in thinking, connection with tradition, and emotional expression.

=== Suicide prevention ===
Various suicide prevention strategies have been suggested by mental-health professionals:

- Promoting mental resilience through optimism and connectedness.
- Education about suicide, including risk factors, warning signs, and the availability of help.
- Increasing the proficiency of health and welfare services in responding to people in need. This includes better training for health professionals and employing crisis-counseling organizations.
- Reducing domestic violence, substance abuse, and divorce are long-term strategies to reduce many mental health problems.
- Reducing access to convenient means of suicide (e.g. toxic substances, handguns, ropes/shoelaces).
- Reducing the quantity of dosages supplied in packages of non-prescription medicines e.g. aspirin.
- Interventions targeted at high-risk groups.

For parents and caregivers:

- Observe changes in child's behavior, habits, and mood, and seek help when necessary.

== Research ==
Research into suicide is published across a wide spectrum of journals dedicated to the biological, economic, psychological, medical, and social sciences. In addition to those, a few journals are exclusively devoted to the study of suicide (suicidology), most notably, Crisis, Suicide and Life-Threatening Behavior, and the Archives of Suicide Research.
