= David A. Jobes =

American clinical psychologist and professor

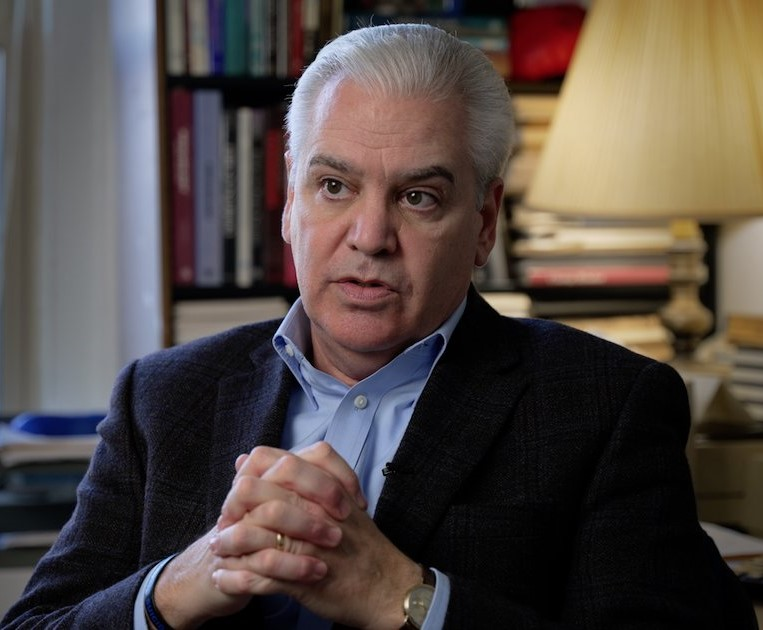
David A. Jobes, PhD, ABPP

David A. Jobes (born 1958 in Cleveland, Ohio) is an American clinical psychologist. He is currently serving as a Professor of Psychology, Director of the Suicide Prevention Laboratory, and Associate Director of Clinical Training at The Catholic University of America. His areas of focus are on Clinical Psychology, Suicide prevention, Clinical Suicidology, Ethics and Risk Management, and Clinical Risk Assessment. In August 2022, he was awarded the Alfred Wellner Award for Lifetime Achievement by The National Register of Health Service Psychologists. In June 2025, he was awarded the Erwin Ringel Service Award by the International Association for Suicide Prevention (IASP) for exceptional service and global leadership in suicide prevention.

== Education and career ==
Jobes earned a bachelor's degree (BA) cum laude in psychology from the University of Colorado Boulder in 1981. He then enrolled at American University, Washington DC, where he received a M.A. in General Psychology in 1984 and obtained a PhD in Clinical psychology from in 1988. His clinical internship was completed at the Washington DC Veterans Affairs Medical Center (1986–1987). Between 1989 and 1990 he became a licensed Psychologist in Maryland and Washington, D.C. Jobes was appointed to serve as the Assistant Director of the National Center for the Study and Prevention of Suicide between 1991 and 1995. In 1995, he was the Treasurer of the American Association of Suicidology. He was awarded by the American Association of Suicidology the Edwin S. Shneidman award for his contributions to suicidology. In 1998, Jobes was elected President of the American Association of Suicidology where he served until 1999.

Since 2003, he served as the President, board of directors, Washington Psychological Center. Between 2001 and 2005 he was Director of the General Masters Degree Program, Psychology Department, The Catholic University of America. He is also the Associate Director of Clinical Training, The Catholic University of America. He is a Fellow of the American Psychological Association and is a board certified Clinical Psychologist by American Board of Professional Psychology. Jobes maintains a private clinical and consulting practice in Washington D.C and in Maryland.

He is the author of seven books, hundreds of peer-reviewed journal articles, and book chapters.

== Academic career ==
In 1987, Jobes joined the Department of Psychology at The Catholic University of America. Between 1987-1992, Jobes was an Assistant Professor of Psychology at The Catholic University of America. In 1992, he became an associate professor at the same institution until 2002. In 2002, Jobes was promoted to a full Professor at The Catholic University of America. He is the Director of The Catholic University of America Suicide Prevention Lab. In 2013, Jobes was appointed Adjunct Professor of Psychiatry School of Medicine, Uniformed Services University.

== Research areas and contributions ==
The research focus of The Catholic University Suicide Prevention Lab is centered on clinical risk assessment (using both quantitative and qualitative methods) and treatment of suicidal risk with different suicidal populations in different clinical settings. Jobes has particularly focused his research on clinical interventions for patients who are suicidal patients using a novel therapeutic approach called the "Collaborative Assessment and Management of Suicidality"—CAMS). Jobes and his team are currently engaged in funded clinical trials to investigate the effectiveness of CAMS with patients who are suicidal using CAMS in the US and other countries. There are fourteen published open clinical trials supporting CAMS, and there are seven published randomized controlled trials supporting CAMS, along with two meta analyses. Another five RCTs are underway and various other trials are being developed for using CAMS with different populations around the world.

In 2014, Jobes founded CAMS-care, LLC to train clinicians in CAMS to decrease suffering and save lives through effective care.

Jobes has been a consultant of the US military. His lab has long been involved in Veterans Affairs and military suicide prevention pursuing empirical research with both Veterans and active duty personnel who are suicidal. As a professor he teaches courses in clinical psychology, ethics and professional practice, psychotherapy, research methods, clinical theory, assessment interviewing, a seminar on suicide and the psychology of living.

== Selected publications ==
=== Books ===
- Cimbolic, P., & Jobes, D. A. (1990). Youth suicide: Issues, assessment, and intervention. Springfield, Illinois: Charles C. Thomas.
- Berman, A. L., & Jobes, D. A. (1991). Adolescent suicide: Assessment and intervention. Washington, DC: American Psychological Association. (Also translated into the Italian language by Edizioni Scientifiche Magi—translation by Bruna Maccarrone).
- Berman, A. L., Jobes, D. A., & Silverman, M. M. (2006). Adolescent Suicide: Assessment and Intervention (2nd Edition). Washington, DC: American Psychological Association.
- Michel, K. & Jobes, D. A. (2011). Building a therapeutic alliance with the suicidal patient. Washington, DC: American Psychological Association Press.
- Jobes, D. A. (2023). Managing suicidal risk: A collaborative approach. New York: The Guilford Press.

=== Journal articles ===
- Jobes, D. A. (1995). The challenge and the promise of clinical suicidology. Suicide and Life-Threatening Behavior, 25, pages 437–449.
- Jobes, D. A. (2000). Collaborating to prevent suicide: A clinical-research perspective. Suicide and Life-Threatening Behavior, 30, pages 8–17
- Jobes, D. A. (2012). "The collaborative assessment and management of suicidality (CAMS): An evolving evidence-based clinical approach to suicidal risk". Suicide and Life-Threatening Behavior. 42 (6): 640–653. doi:10.1111/j.1943-278X.2012.00119.x. PMID 22971238.
- Jobes, David A. (December 2017). "Clinical assessment and treatment of suicidal risk: A critique of contemporary care and CAMS as a possible remedy". Practice Innovations. 2 (4): 207–220. doi:10.1037/pri0000054. ISSN 2377-8903. S2CID 80428600.
- Jobes, David A.; Chalker, Samantha A. (2019). "One Size Does Not Fit All: A Comprehensive Clinical Approach to Reducing Suicidal Ideation, Attempts, and Deaths". International Journal of Environmental Research and Public Health. 16 (19): 3606. doi:10.3390/ijerph16193606. ISSN 1660-4601. PMC 6801408. PMID 31561488.
- Jobes, David A.; Joiner, Thomas E. (2019). "Reflections on Suicidal Ideation". Crisis. 40 (4): 227–230. doi:10.1027/0227-5910/a000615. ISSN 0227-5910. PMID 31274031. S2CID 195806598.
- Jobes, David A. (2020-11-01). "Commonsense Recommendations for Standard Care of Suicidal Risk". Journal of Health Service Psychology. 46 (4): 155–163. doi:10.1007/s42843-020-00020-3. ISSN 2662-2653. S2CID 226201710.
- Jobes, D. A., Mandel, A. A., Kleiman, E., Bryan, C. J., Johnson, S. L., & Joiner, T. (2024). Facets of suicidal ideation. Archives of Suicide Research. https://doi.org/10.1080/13811118.2023.2299259
- Jobes, D. A., & Barnett, J. E. (2024). Evidence-based care for suicidality as an ethical and professional imperative: How to decrease suicidal suffering and save lives. American Psychologist. https://doi.org/10.1037/amp0001325
- Jobes, D. A. & Rizvi, S. L. (2024). The use of CAMS and DBT to effectively treat patients who are suicidal. Frontiers in Psychiatry. https://doi.org/10.3389/fpsyt.2024.1354430
