= Michelle Linn-Gust =

Michelle L. Rusk
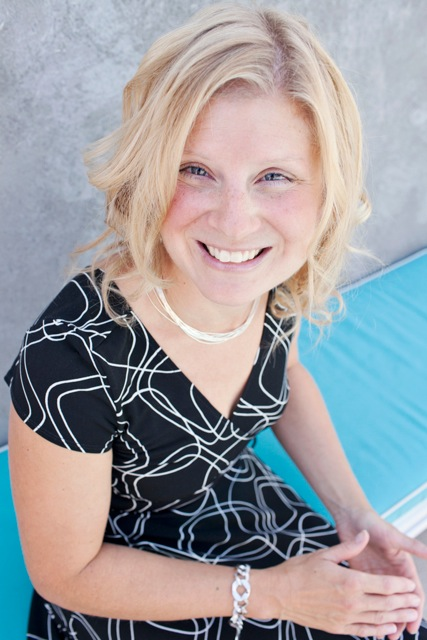
- Born: December 12, 1971 (age 54); Chicago, Illinois
- Education: University of New Mexico
- Occupations: Past President of the American Association of Suicidology, Author & Speaker
- Writing career
- Genres: Psychology; Suicidology
- Website: chellesummer.com

Michelle L. Rusk, born Michelle Linn (December 12, 1971), and formerly known as Michelle Linn-Gust, is an American author and speaker on coping with grief following suicide, especially that of siblings. She is a Past President of the American Association of Suicidology and she has written several books about the experiences of families following the suicide of a member, given workshops to the bereaved and the clinicians who work with them on dealing with their grief, and spoken widely on the topic. She also has offered workshops in the Southwest for the Navajo and Pueblo peoples of the reservations, who have suffered high rates of suicide among young people. From 2012 to 2015 she wrote the Good Causes column for the Naperville Sun newspaper and today is working to inspire hope and healing in people who have suffered loss, particularly divorced women.

== Early life and education ==
Michelle Linn was born in 1971 and reared in the Chicago suburb of Naperville, the third of four children. Her family included a younger sister. She wanted to be a writer since elementary school. After attending public schools, Linn attended Ball State University, where she worked toward a degree in magazine journalism. She also wrote for the student newspaper, the Ball State Daily News.

Her younger sister Denise Linn suffered in high school from depression and bulimia, an eating disorder. She died by suicide in 1993 at age 17, an event that had a profound effect on Linn. Michelle Linn published her first piece about her sister and her death two weeks later in her university newspaper. Linn eventually changed the direction of her studies and writing as a result of her loss, having learned there were few sources to help siblings of suicides. In 2013, Michelle was awarded the Journalism Alumnus Award for her work around the suicide bereaved. That year she also won the National Alliance on Mental Illness - DuPage County Chapter Supporter of the Year Award for her columns in The Naperville Sun newspaper about mental illness.

In the summer of 1993, Linn had a communications internship with USA Boxing at the United States Olympic Training Center in Colorado Springs, Colorado. While there, she befriended LaRita Archibald of the HEARTBEAT survivors of suicide loss support groups and became interested in how such groups help families. Linn-Gust finished her B.S. degree at Ball State in May 1994. That fall she began graduate work at the University of New Mexico and earned an M.S. in Health Education in May 1996. Later she returned for more study, earning her Ph.D. in Family Studies from the University of New Mexico in 2008.

== Career ==
While student teaching in Albuquerque, Linn-Gust continued to write about her experiences following the loss of her sister. She began work on what eventually developed into her first book, Do They Have Bad Days in Heaven? Surviving the Suicide Loss of a Sibling (2001). Creating a self-help book, she wrote about her strategies for dealing with grief after a sibling's death. Following its publication, Linn-Gust was invited to speak nationally and, later, internationally about the experiences of family members after a suicide. She also writes about grief after sibling loss, which often is not given as much societal attention as the loss of parents or spouses.

Linn-Gust has made these associated topics her major field of study, writing, and education. She is recognized as an expert on sibling and family experiences of grief after the suicide of a member. While working on her dissertation, she got her first dog. This prompted her to explore how animal companions help people through grief and other life challenges. She published an article and a memoir in 2007 that address the role of companion animals.

She has continued to write about family survivors of suicide and how they can deal with grief. She is also working on the broader issue of helping people to cultivate hope. Since 2003, Linn-Gust has worked with Navajo and Pueblo communities on reservations in the Southwest because of their high rates of suicide. She has been careful to listen to the people and learn about their cultures.

Linn-Gust's first fiction novel, The Australian Pen Pal, was released on April 19, 2011, followed by Sisters: The Karma Twist released in September 2011.

On December 12, 2012, on her birthday, Conversations with the Water: A Memoir of Cultivating Hope, was released, Michelle's latest book, one that chronicles her view of her sister's death nearly 20 years later, her divorce, and learning to surf at age 39.

On June 13, 2015, she married Gregory Rusk, the grandson of former Secretary of State Dean Rusk and the son of David Rusk, former mayor of Albuquerque. As a gift to their wedding guests, Michelle wrote a novel called The Green Dress and it was released on the day of the wedding.

== Additional works ==
- 2007, Ginger’s Gift: Hope and Healing through Dog Companionship,
- 2010, Rocky Roads: The Journeys of Families through Suicide Grief.
- 2010, co-authored with John Peters, Winding Road: A Handbook for those Supporting the Suicide Bereaved
- 2011, Seeking Hope: Stories of the Suicide Bereaved, Eds. Linn-Gust, M., & Cerel, J. The proceeds from the book are going to a fund at the American Association of Suicidology to support suicide bereavement research.

== Associations and public speaking ==
Linn-Gust became active in associations supporting survivors of suicide. In 2006 she served as president of the New Mexico Suicide Prevention Coalition. She has also edited Surviving Suicide, a newsletter published by the American Association of Suicidology.

Formerly on the Board of Directors of the American Association of Suicidology, Linn-Gust was elected president in 2011. She is the first person to serve as president who does not have clinical experience. Founded in 1968 by Edwin S. Shneidman, this is the oldest organization in the United States dedicated to suicide prevention, intervention, and postvention.
