= Anestis =

Anestis is a Greek given name. Notable people with the name include:

- Anestis Anastasiadis (born 1983), Greek footballer
- Anestis Argyriou (born 1988), Greek footballer
- Anestis Agritis (born 1981), Greek footballer
- Anestis Chatziliadis (born 1991), Greek footballer
- Anestis Delias (1912–1944), Greek bouzouki player
- Anestis Dalakouras (born 1993), Greek volleyball player
- Anestis Logothetis (1921–1994), Austrian avant-garde composer
- Anestis Mythou (born 2007), Greek footballer

== See also ==
- Anestis (surname)
