= Diego De Leo =

Italian academic and psychiatrist (born 1951)

Diego De Leo (born 1951) is an Italian professor, physician, and psychiatrist. Until August 2015, he served as the director of the Australian Institute for Suicide Research and Prevention (AISRAP), a World Health Organization Collaborating Centre for Research and Training in Suicide Prevention at Griffith University in Brisbane, Australia.

De Leo has been a member of the editorial board of Crisis: The Journal of Crisis Intervention and Suicide Prevention since 1990. He served as editor-in-chief from 2008 to early 2018 (co-editing with Annette Beautrais until 2010) and is now editor emeritus of the journal.

He is frequently cited in Australian media as an expert on suicide prevention.

== Early life and education ==
De Leo received a degree in Medicine and Surgery from the University of Padua in 1977, followed by a diploma in psychiatry from the same institution. In 1981, he studied behavioural sciences at the University of Leiden in the Netherlands. During this period, a close colleague died by suicide, which motivated De Leo to pursue suicide prevention as his primary research focus. He concentrated his studies on suicide among the elderly and completed his doctorate in 1988. His dissertation, titled Sunset Depression, was later developed into the book Depression and Suicide in Late Life, which explores self-destructive behaviour in older adults.

== Career ==
After graduation, De Leo developed TeleHelp (also known as TeleCheck), the first system in Italy to provide medical and psychosocial assistance to frail elderly individuals living at home. He also co-founded the Italian Association for Suicide Prevention and established an Italian registry for suicidal behaviours. In 1986, he initiated and led the Psychogeriatric Service at the University of Padua, and in 1992, he founded a dedicated Suicide Research Unit.

=== World Health Organization ===
De Leo presented findings from his dissertation on Sunset Depression to members of the World Health Organization (WHO) in Geneva. In 1991, he was invited to organize a meeting in Padua, Italy, on the future of global mental health. He continued collaborating with WHO, researching various topics including depression and stress-related conditions, and participating in international committees and task forces focused on improving the quality of suicide mortality data.

In collaboration with the WHO Headquarters and the European Office, De Leo studied quality of life, particularly among the elderly. Alongside David Jenkins, he developed PEQOL, an evaluation tool for assessing quality of life in older adults. Later, in partnership with Jouko Lönnqvist, René Diekstra, and Marco Trabucchi, he co-created the LEIPAD quality of life assessment. In 1995, De Leo co-chaired the WHOQOL project, which aimed to develop a standardized instrument for measuring health-related quality of life.

De Leo was a member of the WHO/EURO Multi-Centre Study on Suicidal Behaviour from 1988 to 2001 and directed the WHO Collaborating Centre for Research and Training in Suicide Prevention at the University of Padua from 1997 to 2002.

In 2001, De Leo initiated the WHO/SUPRE-MISS study, which collected data from China, Iran, Vietnam, Brazil, South Africa, Estonia, India, and Sri Lanka. The study highlighted the critical role of continuity of care in reducing suicide mortality. During his tenure as president of the International Association for Suicide Prevention (IASP), De Leo founded World Suicide Prevention Day in 2003. Held annually on 10 September, this global event raises awareness about suicide prevention and emphasizes that suicide is preventable.

In 2005, De Leo was appointed director of the newly established WHO Collaborating Centre for Research and Training in Suicide Prevention at Griffith University in Australia. In 2006, he also became director of the Australian Institute for Suicide Research and Prevention (AISRAP) at Griffith University. That same year, he helped launch the Suicide Trends in At-Risk Territories (START) study, in collaboration with the WHO Western Pacific Regional Office. This study involved 22 countries.

De Leo co-authored a chapter on self-directed violence in the 2002 World Report on Violence and Health. He also authored the Blue Booklet Series, WHO guidelines for media professionals on reporting suicide data and recording non-fatal suicidal behaviour, and contributed to the suicide prevention module of the WHO mhGAP program.

=== Australian Institute for Suicide Research and Prevention ===
De Leo became director of the Australian Institute for Suicide Research and Prevention (AISRAP) at Griffith University in 1998. In 2001, he organized two postgraduate education programs at Griffith University: the Master of Suicidology and the Graduate Certificate in Suicidology in Suicide Prevention Studies. These programs were the first of their kind globally, dedicated exclusively to suicide prevention education.

In 2002, AISRAP became an accredited agency for delivering suicide prevention training. In 2004, De Leo established the Life Promotion Clinic, a research outpatient service for suicidal patients. The clinic specialized in psychological treatments and operated as an agency of the Royal Australian and New Zealand College of Psychiatrists, providing training for psychiatry students.

=== Other research activities ===
De Leo is president of the non-profit De Leo Fund Onlus, a third-sector organization he co-founded in 2005. The De Leo Fund supports people traumatized by sudden or traumatic deaths—such as road or workplace accidents, suicide, homicide, or natural disasters—through services including a national telephone helpline, live chat, online forums, and in-person or virtual counseling sessions. He also established an award in memory of his children, presented biennially by the International Association for Suicide Prevention to recognize distinguished research on suicidal behaviours conducted in developing countries.

In 2010, De Leo accepted a part-time role as professor of Biopsychology at the University of Primorska in Slovenia. In 2011, he was appointed director of the newly established Slovenian Centre for Suicide Research, founded by the Andrej Marušič Institute at the University of Primorska.

In 2023, De Leo was elected president of the Associazione Italiana di Psicogeriatria (Italian Psychogeriatric Association) and in 2024, he was appointed Secretary of the International Psychogeriatric Association.

De Leo is affiliated with the Department of Community Medicine at West Virginia University, a member of the Special Consortium on Suicide Prevention for the American Army, and an honorary professor of psychiatry at the University of Queensland. He also serves on the Australian Suicide Prevention Advisory Council and the Queensland Advisory Group on Suicide (QAGS). Additionally, he is the co-founder of the Italian Society for Psycho-Oncology.

== Publications ==
De Leo is the author of numerous scientific articles and books. His most recent volumes include Turning Points (2011) and Bereavement After Traumatic Deaths (2013). He is also the editor of Suicide Research: Selected Readings.

De Leo has served on the editorial boards of several international journals, including:

- Italian Journal of Suicidology – founder and former editor-in-chief
- Crisis: The Journal of Crisis Intervention and Suicide Prevention – editor emeritus
- Open Journal of Medical Psychology – former editor-in-chief
- GeroPsych – co-editor-in-chief
- Suicide & Life-Threatening Behavior – editorial board member
- Archives of Suicide Research – editorial board member
- General Psychiatry – editorial board member
- International Journal of Environmental Research and Public Health – editorial board member
- Aging, Clinical and Experimental Research – editorial board member

== Awards and honours ==
- In 1991, the International Association for Suicide Prevention awarded De Leo the Stengel Award for his research in the field of suicidology.
- In 2007, Griffith University awarded him the title of Doctor of Science for his research in suicidology and psychogeriatrics.
- Also in 2007, he received the Life Research Award from the Commonwealth of Australia and Suicide Prevention Australia.
- In 2011, the American Association of Suicidology presented him with the Louis Dublin Award for his contributions to suicide prevention.
- In 2012, he received the Griffith University Research Leadership Award.
- In 2013, he was appointed an Officer in the General Division of the Order of Australia (AO) for his contributions to psychiatry and the development of national and international suicide prevention strategies.
- In 2017, he received The Morselli Medal from the International Academy for Suicide Research (IASR) for his significant contributions to the study of suicidal behaviour and suicide prevention.

== Family life ==
De Leo is married to Cristina Trevisan, an interior decorator and modern art expert. They had two sons, who died in a road accident in Italy in 2005.

== De Leo Fund Award ==
The De Leo Fund Award is an international research award presented in collaboration with the International Association for Suicide Prevention (IASP). Established on April 5, 2005, in memory of Nicola and Vittorio De Leo—the sons of Professor Diego De Leo and Cristina De Leo, who tragically passed away in a car accident—the fund aims to support young scholars and researchers working in suicide prevention within developing and low- to middle-income countries. The award is conferred biennially during the World Congress of the IASP.

=== History and foundation ===
Following the tragic loss of Professor Diego De Leo's sons, colleagues from the American Association of Suicidology made a donation to the IASP during the XXV IASP Congress in Durban, South Africa. The General Assembly unanimously decided to establish the De Leo Fund. The award specifically recognizes exceptional scientific contributions and epidemiological studies on suicidal behaviors in regions with limited research infrastructure.
