= Michael Anestis =

American clinical psychologist and suicidologist

Michael David Anestis
- Born: November 18, 1979 (age 46)
- Citizenship: American
- Education: Florida State University
- Known for: Suicide research
- Spouse: Joye Anestis
- Children: Two (one son, one daughter)
- Awards: 2018 Shneidman Award from the American Association of Suicidology
- Scientific career
- Fields: Psychology, suicidology
- Workplaces: University of Southern Mississippi, Rutgers University
- Thesis: Affective and behavioral dysregulation: An analysis of individual difference variables in the acquired capability for suicide (2011)
- Doctoral advisor: Thomas Joiner

Michael David Anestis (born November 18, 1979) is an American clinical psychologist and associate professor in the Department of Urban-Global Public Health in the Rutgers School of Public Health, as well as the executive director of the New Jersey Gun Violence Research Center. Before joining the faculty of Rutgers in 2020, he taught at the University of Southern Mississippi, where he first joined the faculty in 2012.

== Education ==
Anestis received his B.A. from Yale University in 2002 and his M.A. and Ph.D. from Florida State University in 2007 and 2011, respectively. His Ph.D. thesis was entitled Affective and behavioral dysregulation: An analysis of individual difference variables in the acquired capability for suicide.

== Research ==
Anestis' research pertains to multiple topics in the field of clinical psychology, including suicide and emotional dysregulation in people with psychiatric disorders, as well as suicide more generally. For example, he has published studies questioning the effectiveness of equine-assisted therapy. He has also researched various issues related to suicide prevention, including the relationship between gun control laws and suicide rates. For example, in a 2015 study, he found that laws prohibiting open carrying of guns in Oklahoma and California reduced suicide rates in the year after each was passed. In 2017, he led another study showing that suicide rates declined in states with universal background check and waiting period laws compared to states without such laws. He has also co-authored research showing that military personnel who have undergone basic training have more suicide capability than those who have not, in line with his belief that impulsivity and capability are both important to the risk of suicide.

In January 2018, his book Guns and Suicide: An American Epidemic was published by Oxford University Press.

== Personal life ==
Anestis is married to Joye Anestis, an associate professor in the Department of Health Behavior, Society and Policy at Rutgers. They have a son and a daughter.
