= Psychological autopsy =

Method of investigating possible suicides

Psychological autopsy in suicidology (or also psychiatric autopsy) is a systematic procedure for evaluating suicidal intention in equivocal cases. It was invented by American psychologists Norman Farberow and Edwin S. Shneidman during their time working at the Los Angeles Suicide Prevention Center, which they founded in 1958.

The method entails collecting all available information on a deceased individual through forensic examinations, examining health records, and conducting interviews with relatives and friends. This information is then used to determine the individual’s risk factors and psychological state before their death to help determine their cause of death.

== History ==
Farberow and Shneidman pioneered the psychological autopsy while working at the Los Angeles Suicide Prevention Center in the 1950s. They developed the procedure after being asked by the Coroner to help identify the cause of death in equivocal suicides. The procedure was influenced by Farberow and Shneidman’s time studying suicide notes from the Los Angeles County Coroner’s Office.

The psychological autopsy method was first used when Coroner Theodore J. Curphrey asked for the Suicide Prevention Center’s help in investigating a high number of drug-induced deaths. The procedure was also used after Curphrey enlisted psychiatrist Robert E. Litman and Farberow to help determine the mental state of Marilyn Monroe before her death. Farberow ruled Monroe’s death a probable suicide after the investigation.

The psychological autopsy method has been adopted by the United States Department of Defense and in 2002, psychological autopsies became a part of its training curriculum.

The psychological autopsy has also been used to help determine the likelihood of suicide in criminal cases such as Jackson v. State and U.S. v. St. Jean and civil cases such as Mutual Life Insurance Company v. Terry.

== Processes ==
The psychological autopsy was developed to help clarify equivocal deaths, or deaths without a clear or appropriate mode. Examples of equivocal death scenarios include drug-related deaths, autoerotic and self-induced asphyxia, vehicular deaths, and drownings.

When conducting psychological autopsies, investigators attempt to identify a decedent’s intention in regard to their death. Psychological autopsies first attempt to answer how an individual died, why they died at a specific time, and the most probable cause of death. If the cause of death is clear, investigators attempt to determine the reasons for an individual’s actions that led to death. Suicidal intent is measured by factors such as means of death, prior threats to commit suicide, and settling of financial accounts. In psychological autopsies, mental disorders are also strongly associated with suicide.

Intent is determined by analyzing information about the decedent collected from interviews with friends and family, along with information gained from the related forensic examination into the decedent’s death. Information from the decedent’s health records is also examined, including any illnesses, treatment, and therapy and family history of death. Investigators usually look for details such as behavioral patterns in response to stress, recent changes in behavior, suicidal ideation, use of alcohol and/or drugs, and recent traumatic events.

== Ovenstone criteria ==
European Union Agency for Railways uses so-called Ovenstone criteria to distinguish a death as a deliberate act. Also, the British College of Policing advises to use these criteria named after Irene Ovenstone to determine a suspected suicide. Irene Ovenstone introduced these criteria in 1973. She applied this method in the review of the verdicts in Edinburgh. The review revealed a potential under-reporting of suicide of 40.67%. These criteria are:

1. Suicide note, written or oral, where the intention is communicated and where the traffic incident supports a suicide
2. A traffic incident that indicates a suicide in combination with knowledge of
  1. Recent suicide attempts
  2. Recent indirect suicidal communication
  3. Communication about committing suicide or having no reason to live
  4. Ongoing mental illness or prolonged depression
  5. Previous major traumatic life event
3. A traffic incident that strongly suggests a suicide
