= Psychological pain =

Unpleasant feeling of a psychological nature

- Other names: Suffering, mental agony, mental pain, emotional pain, algopsychalia, psychic pain, social pain, spiritual pain, soul pain, psychache
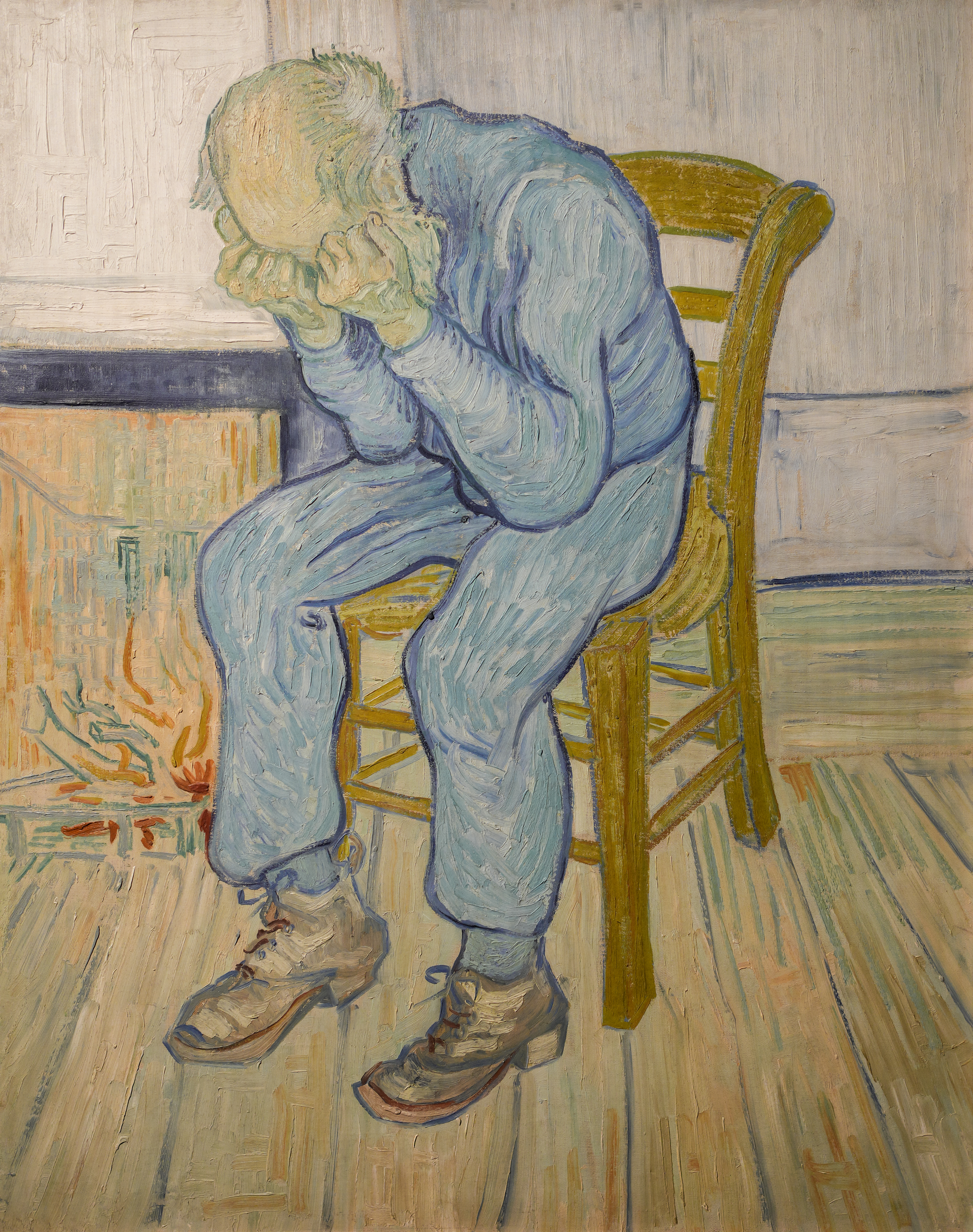
- Vincent van Gogh's 1890 painting Sorrowing old man ('At Eternity's Gate'), where a man weeps due to the unpleasant feelings of psychological pain.
- Specialty: Psychiatry, psychology
- Medication: Antidepressant medication, Analgesic medication

Psychological pain, mental pain, or emotional pain is an unpleasant feeling (a suffering) of a psychological, mental origin. A pioneer in the field of suicidology, Edwin S. Shneidman, described it as "how much you hurt as a human being. It is mental suffering; mental torment." There are numerous ways psychological pain is referred to; using a different word usually reflects an emphasis on a particular aspect of mind life. Technical terms include algopsychalia and psychalgia, but it may also be called mental pain, emotional pain, psychic pain, social pain, spiritual or soul pain, or suffering. While these are not equivalent terms, one systematic comparison of theories and models of psychological pain, psychic pain, emotional pain, and suffering concluded that each describes the same profoundly unpleasant feeling. Psychological pain is widely believed to be an inescapable aspect of human existence.

Other descriptions of psychological pain are "a wide range of subjective experiences characterized as an awareness of negative changes in the self and in its functions accompanied by negative feelings", "a diffuse subjective experience ... differentiated from physical pain which is often localized and associated with noxious physical stimuli", and "a lasting, unsustainable, and unpleasant feeling resulting from negative appraisal of an inability or deficiency of the self."

== Causes ==
The adjective "psychological" is thought to encompass the functions of beliefs, thoughts, feelings, and behaviors, which may be seen as an indication for the many sources of psychological pain. One way of grouping these different sources of pain was offered by Shneidman, who stated that psychological pain is caused by frustrated psychological needs. For example, the need for love, autonomy, affiliation, and achievement, or the need to avoid harm, shame, and embarrassment. Psychological needs were originally described by Henry Murray in 1938 as needs that motivate human behavior. Shneidman maintained that people rate the importance of each need differently, which explains why people's level of psychological pain differs when confronted with the same frustrated need. This needs perspective coincides with Patrick David Wall's description of physical pain that says that physical pain indicates a need state much more than a sensory experience.

Unmet psychological needs in youth may cause an inability to meet human needs later in life. As a consequence of neglectful parenting, children with unmet psychological needs in childhood may be linked to psychotic disorders throughout life.

In the fields of social psychology and personality psychology, the term social pain is used to denote psychological pain caused by harm or threat to social connection; bereavement, embarrassment, shame and hurt feelings are subtypes of social pain. From an evolutionary perspective, psychological pain forces the assessment of actual or potential social problems that might reduce the individual's fitness for survival. The way people display their psychological pain socially (for example, crying, shouting, or moaning) serves the purpose of indicating that they are in need.

== Neuropsychology ==
Physical pain and psychological pain share common underlying neurological mechanisms. Brain regions that were consistently found to be implicated in both types of pain are the anterior cingulate cortex and prefrontal cortex (some subregions more than others), and may extend to other regions as well. Brain regions that were also found to be involved in psychological pain include the insular cortex, posterior cingulate cortex, thalamus, parahippocampal gyrus, basal ganglia, and cerebellum. Some advocate that, because similar brain regions are involved in both physical pain and psychological pain, pain should be seen as a continuum that ranges from purely physical to purely psychological. Moreover, many sources mention the fact that many metaphors of physical pain are used to refer to psychologically painful experiences. Further connection between physical and psychological pain has been supported through proof that acetaminophen, an analgesic, can suppress activity in the anterior cingulate cortex and the insular cortex when experiencing social exclusion, the same way that it suppresses activity when experiencing physical pain, and reduces the agitation of people with dementia. However, use of paracetamol for more general psychological pain remains disputed.

== Borderline personality disorder ==
Borderline personality disorder (BPD) has long been believed to be a disorder that produces the most intense emotional pain and distress in those who have this condition. Studies have shown that borderline patients experience chronic and significant emotional suffering and mental agony. Borderline patients may feel overwhelmed by negative emotions, experiencing intense grief instead of sadness, shame and humiliation instead of mild embarrassment, rage instead of annoyance, and panic instead of nervousness. People with BPD are especially sensitive to feelings of rejection, isolation and perceived failure. Both clinicians and laymen alike have witnessed the desperate attempts to escape these subjective inner experiences of these patients. Borderline patients are severely impulsive and their attempts to alleviate the agony are often very destructive or self-destructive. Suicidal ideation, suicide attempts, eating disorders (anorexia nervosa, binge eating disorder, and bulimia nervosa), self-harm (cutting, overdosing, starvation, etc.), compulsive spending, gambling, violent and aggressive behavior, sexual promiscuity, and deviant sexual behaviors are desperate attempts to escape this pain.

The intrapsychic pain experienced by those diagnosed with BPD has been studied and compared to normal healthy controls and to others with major depression, bipolar disorder, substance use disorder, schizophrenia, other personality disorders, and a range of other conditions. Although the excruciatingly painful inner experience of the borderline patient is both unique and perplexing, it is often linked to severe childhood trauma of abuse and neglect. In clinical populations, the rate of suicide of patients with borderline personality disorder is estimated to be 10%, a rate far greater than that in the general population and still considerably greater than for patients with schizophrenia and bipolar disorder, though studies on suicidality in bipolar subjects have found that 4-19% of bipolar patients (mostly untreated) commit suicide. However, 60–70% of patients with borderline personality disorder make suicide attempts, so suicide attempts are far more frequent than completed suicides in patients with BPD.

The intense dysphoric states which patients diagnosed with BPD endure on a regular basis distinguishes them from those with other personality disorders: major depressive disorder, bipolar disorder, and virtually all known DSM-IV Axis I and Axis II conditions. In a 1998 study entitled "The Pain of Being Borderline: Dysphoric States Specific to Borderline Personality Disorder", 146 diagnosed borderline patients took a 50-item self-report measure test. The conclusions from this study suggest "that the subjective pain of borderline patients may be both more pervasive and more multifaceted than previously recognised and that the overall "amplitude" of this pain may be a particularly good marker for the borderline diagnosis".

Feelings of emptiness are a central problem for patients with personality disturbances. In an attempt to avoid this feeling, these patients employ defences to preserve their fragmentary selves. Feelings of emptiness may be so painful that suicide is considered.

== See also ==
- Emotion
- Psychological abuse
- Psychological trauma
- Psychosomatic medicine
- Sensory overload
