= Canadian Association for Suicide Prevention =

Canadian non-governmental organization

Canadian Association for Suicide Prevention (CASP)/L'Association canadienne pour la prevention du suicide (ACPS) was established in 1985. It is a non-governmental organization which brings attention to the problem of suicide in Canada and advocates for services, research, education and other supports in the area of suicide prevention and bereavement, across diverse Canadian cultures. CASP presents an annual conference which provides opportunities for networking and the exchange of ideas and information related to suicide prevention, intervention and postvention.

== History ==
The origins of the Canadian Association for Suicide Prevention (CASP) can be traced to an International Association for Suicide Prevention (IASP) meeting in Ottawa in 1979. This was the first major suicide prevention event in Canada, and sparked talks about setting up a national organization. Primarily through the efforts of Jim Brown of Winnipeg and Diane Syer of Toronto, CASP was incorporated in 1985; however, because Syer left Canada for the United States and Brown chose another area of study, CASP ceased to function by 1986.

In 1987, Marcia Krawll, Brian Mishara, Linda Rosenfeld, Bob Sims, Bryan Tanney and Antoon Leenaars met in Lake Louise, Alberta, and later in Quebec to bring back CASP. A five-year plan was developed focusing on the following initiatives: building membership; networking and communication; developing conferences; addressing suicide among First Nations and Inuit Canadians; promoting research and improving operational structures.

CASP was formally re-established by Leenaars at a June 1988 meeting in Montreal hosted by Suicide Action, Montreal. Leenaars was named president; the first office of CASP was in his home in Windsor, Ontario. Later, the Suicide Information and Education Centre (SIEC) in Calgary served as the headquarters of CASP for its early years. In 1989, CASP's first regional conference was held in Toronto, chaired by Isaac Sakinofsky.

The first CASP national conference in 1990 was called "Lifting the silence" and was held in Vancouver, British Columbia. It was chaired by Krawll, Rosenfeld and Tanney. The keynote was delivered by American suicidology pioneer Edwin S. Shneidman. About 500 people, mostly caregivers, clinicians and researchers, attended.

This is a list of CASP annual conferences and their respective host cities:

- 1988 – Montreal
- 1989 – Toronto
- 1990 – Vancouver
- 1991 – Moncton, New Brunswick
- 1992 – Saskatoon, Saskatchewan
- 1993 – Montreal, Quebec
- 1994 – Iqaluit, Northwest Territories
- 1995 – Banff, Alberta
- 1996 – Toronto, Ontario
- 1997 – Thunder Bay, Ontario
- 1998 – Winnipeg, Manitoba
- 1999 – Halifax, Nova Scotia
- 2000 – Vancouver, British Columbia
- 2001 – St. John's Newfoundland
- 2002 – Fredericton, New Brunswick
- 2003 – Iqaluit, Nunavut
- 2004 – Edmonton, Alberta
- 2005 – Ottawa, Ontario
- 2006 – Toronto, Ontario
- 2007 – Yellowknife, Northwest Territories
- 2008 – Quebec City, Quebec
- 2009 – Brandon, Manitoba
- 2010 – Halifax, Nova Scotia
- 2011 – Vancouver, British Columbia
- 2012 – Niagara Falls, Ontario
- 2013 – Winnipeg, Manitoba
- 2014 – Virtual/Online conference
- 2015 – Montreal, Quebec (coincided with IASP conference)
- 2016 – Iqaluit, Nunavut
- 2017 – Toronto, Ontario
- 2018 – St. John's, Newfoundland
- 2019 – Edmonton, Alberta
- 2020 - Virtual
- 2022 - Montreal, Quebec
- 2023 - Halifax, Nova Scotia
- 2024 - Vancouver, British Columbia
- 2025 - Richmond Hill, Ontario

== Advocacy ==
Advocacy efforts undertaken by CASP since 1988 have included encouraging the federal government to research suicide and suicide prevention, health promotion, and national suicide prevention efforts.

In 2004, CASP published The CASP Blueprint for a Canadian National Suicide Prevention Strategy; a second edition was published in 2009. It was essentially a call to the federal government to create a national strategy for suicide prevention. A national strategy has still not been created, although a national framework was issued in 2013; the CASP document has become the blueprint for suicide prevention initiatives throughout Canada.

== Today ==
There is not a physical, brick and mortar office for CASP. All staff live in Canada and it is a national charitable organization in Canada. The organization continues to gather and provide information about suicide prevention in Canada. https://suicideprevention.ca/connect-with-us/
