= Norman Farberow =

American psychologist

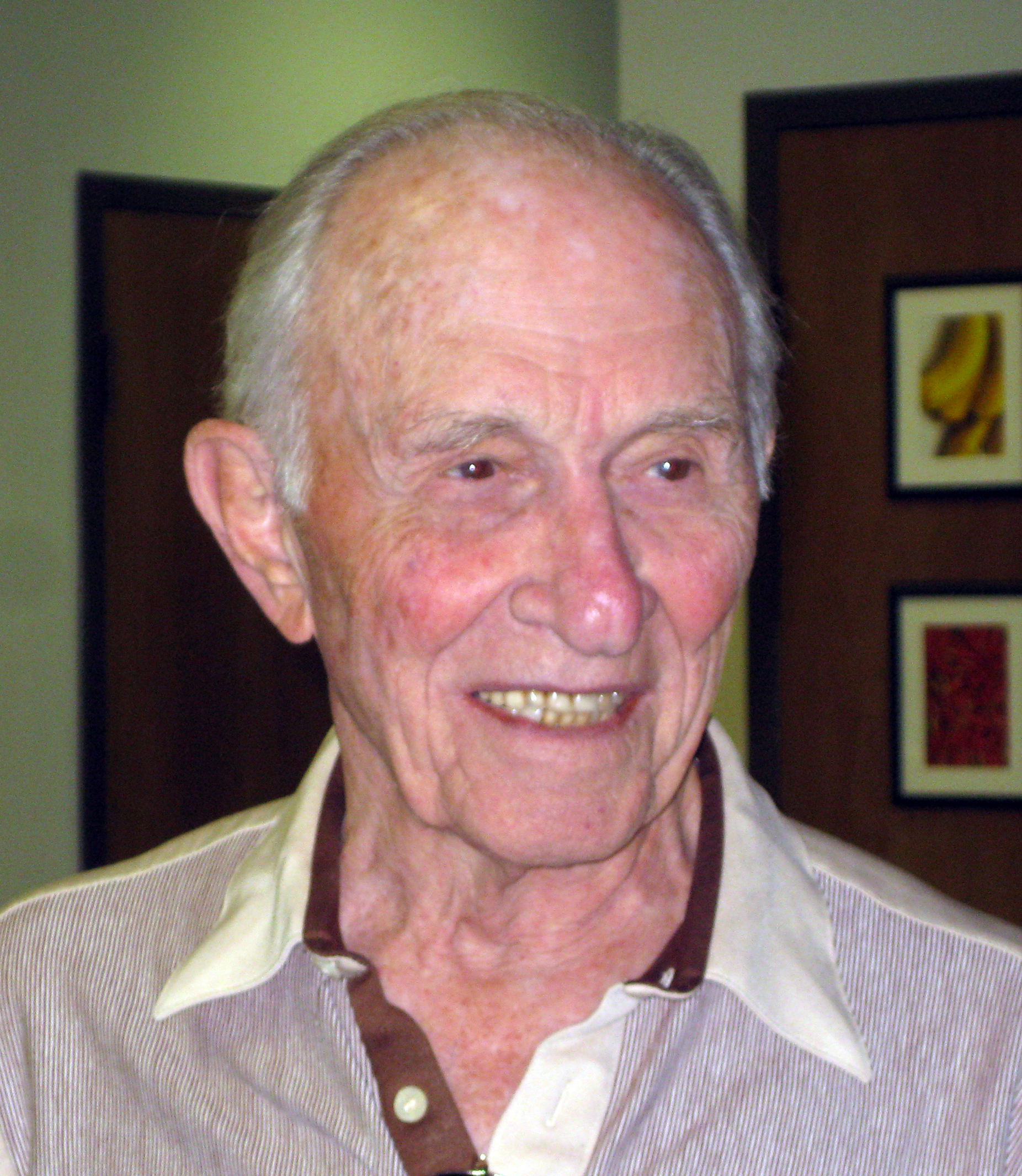
- Farberow at Didi Hirsch Mental Health Services' Survivors After Suicide event in Culver City, California, June 27, 2009
- Born: Norman Louis Farberow; February 12, 1918; Pittsburgh, Pennsylvania, U.S.
- Died: September 10, 2015 (aged 97); Los Angeles, California, U.S.
- Education: University of California, Los Angeles
- Known for: A founding father of modern suicidology
- Scientific career
- Fields: Psychology; Suicidology

Norman Louis Farberow (February 12, 1918 – September 10, 2015) was an American psychologist, and one of the founding fathers of modern suicidology. He was among the three founders in 1958 of the Los Angeles Suicide Prevention Center, which became a base of research into the causes and prevention of suicide.

== Early life and education ==
He was born in 1918 in Pittsburgh, Pennsylvania.

After completing his tour of duty in World War II, Farberow enrolled in the University of California, Los Angeles. While enrolled in UCLA's doctoral program in psychology Farberow studied suicide. With few relevant references to draw upon for his 1949 dissertation, Farberow saw the potential for reawakening “interest in a long-neglected, taboo-encrusted social and personal phenomenon.” Farberow earned his doctoral degree from UCLA in 1950 while working with veterans in the Veterans Administration Mental Hygiene Clinic. He helped found the suicide prevention center along with Robert E. Litman.

== World War II ==
Farberow served as a World War II Air Force Captain. The war years were a time in the United States of relatively low suicide rates, a wartime phenomenon commonly observed when a nation's armed forces and citizens unite under feelings of common purpose and mutual goals.

== Career ==
In the decade after the war, suicide rates rose quickly as the sense of unity and shared purpose began to disappear. Wrenching social and personal readjustments were often needed, and these needs were further complicated by the emotional distress and mental health problems of returning veterans. Many expressed their deepening inner turmoil in unhealthy ways, through suicidal impulses and acts. Suicide's continuing taboo, embedded in cultural and religious condemnations of shame, guilt, self-blame and cowardice, magnified an underlying sense of worthlessness and hopelessness.

Farberow saw the effects of these dynamics and focused on solutions including fundamental and humanitarian changes to the way in which communities treated the suicidal. Soon his time as a psychotherapist became eclipsed by his continuing research on suicide with his colleague, Dr. Edwin Shneidman.

During the 1950s, the men worked together at the Veterans Administration (VA) in Los Angeles and sought answers for another jump in suicide rates—the sudden doubling of suicides among the VA's neuropsychiatric hospital patients. At the same time, a survey they had conducted of L.A.-area hospitals, clinics, and emergency rooms revealed that no provisions existed for the follow-up care of suicide attempters. Farberow and Shneidman shared their findings with the National Institute of Mental Health and the VA and proposed the creation of two agencies: a community-based Referral Center for treating the psychological problems of the suicidal, and a Central Research Unit for assessing and investigating suicide among veterans within the VA.

== The scientific investigation of suicide ==
=== A suicide prevention center ===
In 1958, Farberow and Shneidman launched the nation's first center of its kind, the Los Angeles Suicide Prevention Center (LASPC) with the psychiatrist Robert E. Litman, M.D., as its director. Farberow described Litman as, “a free spirit cloaked in psychoanalytic trappings, always intellectually adventuresome and inquisitive.” Together, the three men developed a scientific professional organization where a social and professional vacuum had once existed. Farberow described this as a time of “attraction and excitement in the feeling that we were into a relatively unexplored area of vital community concern.” The objective of the agency—to provide a center for the follow-up care of suicidal patients discharged after treatment in the Los Angeles County Hospital—changed in the first year as calls came in from people in crisis. Capitalizing on the opportunity to intervene and avert a suicide attempt broadened the center's objective to include crisis intervention and 24-hour accessibility of professionals or rigorously trained non-professionals. These efforts led to the development of the L.A. Scale for Assessment of Suicidal Potential and the crisis hotline.

As the LASPC's reputation as an informed referral center grew, collaboration with the coroner’s office, mental health professionals, police, probation, schools, and other organizations created the awareness needed to demystify suicide’s taboo and give hope to those who were suffering. Through writing, teaching, training, and publishing, LASPC directors disseminated their principles for the organization and functioning of a suicide prevention and crisis intervention community agency. Their principles are still in use today and serve as models in community agencies around the world. The LASPC is now part of a comprehensive mental health facility based in Culver City, California, known as Didi Hirsch Mental Health Services.

=== CRU for SUD ===
The name of the “Central Research Unit for the Study of Unpredicted Death” shows that Farberow and Shneidman at first had to hide the nature of their work. During the 1950s and just after the introduction of psychotropic drugs, the Veterans Administration became concerned with a sudden doubling of the suicide rate of its neuropsychiatric hospital patients. The new psychotropics markedly improved symptoms, allowing patients to be released much sooner than usual. But more patients killed themselves either while on leave or shortly after they returned to the hospital. Farberow determined the new psychotropics were “too successful,” controlling disturbed behavior so well that other treatments, such as psychotherapy, were disregarded. In Farberow's words, “Our research led mental health professionals to accept the fact that the miracle drugs could only do a part of the job and that the psychotropics would have to be integrated into a more comprehensive approach.”

The Unit's analysis of hundreds of veterans' suicide cases allowed Farberow and Shneidman to determine suicidal factors in specific psychiatric syndromes, such as schizophrenia, depression, anxiety and dysthymia, as well as suicidal factors in patients with physical health problems, such as cancer, cardiorespiratory illnesses, and others.

== Other cultural influences ==
=== The psychological autopsy ===
The L.A. County Coroner's request for psychological information to help determine equivocal cases of suicide led Farberow and Shneidman to create the psychological autopsy as a procedure for evaluating the critical factor of intention. With Farberow and his colleagues based in a city known for its Hollywood luminaries, the coroner often called on the men to use the psychological autopsy in determining whether suicide was the cause of death for such celebrities as Marilyn Monroe, Robert Walker, and Marie McDonald. The procedure gained international application as Farberow enlisted other international researchers in the study of personality differences in modes of death in Finland with comparisons of suicides in Los Angeles, Vienna, and Stockholm, among others.

=== Indirect self-destructive behavior ===
As part of his activity in the Central Research Unit for the Study of Unpredicted Death (CRU for SUD) in the Veterans Administration, Farberow identified and characterized his observations of indirect self-destructive behavior, or ISDB, and described a broad range of behaviors ranging from “slight to extreme, from mild smoking to noncompliant medical neglect, from risk-taking, excitement-seeking, depression-averting, denial-mediated aspects of substance abuse addiction to dare-devil flaunting of fate in chasm jumping on a motorcycle.” Farberow considered this body of work integral to understanding the continuum of self-destructive behavior, which he carefully researched and documented in a book entitled The Many Faces of Suicide.

=== Suicide's depiction in the arts ===
“The history of suicide, with its fascinating vagaries, to my view, is seen much more clearly and comprehensively when viewed through its reflection in the paintings of the master artists of their times,” wrote Farberow. While on sabbatical in Europe and on other trips, Farberow frequently visited museums to see paintings, illustrations, and sculpture that depicted suicide; he became interested in studying the visual arts to chronicle history's shifting attitudes. Combining slides and posters, he arranged a collection of works that spanned the millennia. He found a neutral attitude in Biblical suicides, followed by later ambivalence, and then the cry for help indicative of modern times. Farberow's poster collection is held by the American Association of Suicidology, a research-based organization established by Shneidman in 1968.

== Models for group therapy ==
=== For suicidal persons ===
Of the many calls received by LASPC volunteers on the 24-hour crisis hotline, Farberow noted that approximately one-third were acutely suicidal. In Farberow's words, “The chronically suicidal people who made up the other two thirds needed more, mostly continuing evidence of caring, interest, and concern”. Several models of group therapy were developed in the effort to meet different needs. At its height, the group therapy program at LASPC included two long-term insight-oriented groups, a post-crisis oriented time-limited group, a drop-in group, a creative expression group using nonverbal expressive procedures, a socialization group focusing on interaction and relationships, and four drug rehabilitation groups meeting once a week. Farberow wrote about the program, hoping to stimulate other centers, but it never achieved the widespread use as a clinical tool for treatment.

=== For the bereaved ===
Though survivors after a suicide experience the same feelings of loss and grief that are found after any death, they are subject to additional complications because of the taboo aspects of the death and the commonly experienced intense feelings of shame and guilt. As a result, they are often excluded from the comfort and support traditionally offered by family, friends and community at the time of a death. This survivor population required a new approach to group therapy: these were not patients seeking to explore conflicts and problems with a therapist trained in traditional models.

These were people who needed a place to address the stigma of suicide and to talk without guilt or embarrassment. The LASPC introduced this new model in the 1980s and identified two major aspects:

- Meetings would be led by a mental health professional and a survivor facilitator, and
- Meetings would be limited to eight weeks with monthly follow-ups for those that wish it.

They determined the meetings would focus on caring, sharing, support, and interactive discussion—not conflict identification and resolution, aspects typically addressed in traditional group therapy.

The model for the Survivors After Suicide program quickly grew in the United States and Canada. Change came more slowly in Europe, where the cultural and religious taboos around suicide were more deeply entrenched. The establishment of the international Farberow Award in the IASP (see below) has helped this therapeutic model gain universal acceptance.

== International collaboration ==
Farberow distinguishes Vienna Psychiatrist Erwin Ringel as a crucial pioneer in the development of suicide prevention in the world. Ringel convened the first European meeting focused on suicide prevention in 1960 in Vienna. The following year, Ringel visited the LASPC and invited Farberow to share his vision. In its infancy, the concept of a new global organization underwent “a classic clash of American vs. European ideas of how an Association was structured.” Farberow wrote, “My approach reflected my experience in U.S. psychology governance while his approach reflected his experience in an autocratic university and European associations.” The commitment to argue through and resolve these issues resulted in a global organization that constitutes an important part of Farberow's professional legacy, the International Association for Suicide Prevention (IASP). Today, the IASP consists of a consortium of National Associations, mental health agencies, clinicians, researchers, and survivors of suicide from more than fifty countries.

== Overview ==
Farberow rates as the most significant impacts work to be the lessening of the taboos related to suicide, so that the cry for help could be both more readily voiced and more easily heard. While preparing items for inclusion in the bibliography of his first book, The Cry for Help, Farberow noted an average of thirty-five suicide-related journal items per year over a sixty-year period, from 1897 through 1957. With the opening of the LASPC and the continual documentation of its progress, the long-neglected status of suicide as a significant public, physical, and mental health problem began to change. When Farberow collected citations for a second bibliography nine years later, the number had surged to roughly one hundred per year. The awareness created by Farberow, Shneidman, and Litman stimulated a growth in publications on all aspects of suicide.

The conundrum of suicide maintained its challenge. Farberow examined the shifting nature of risk within a variety of subgroups, including police officers, gay men, the obese, schizophrenics and other psychiatric patients. youth, adolescents, the aged, and the chronically and terminally ill. He evaluated and developed scales for assessing suicide risk in various levels of public schools and universities; offered recommendations to doctors, nurses, and hospitals; assisted in addressing the problems of the coroner and the bereaved; provided expert witness testimony for numerous trials; and consulted with both professional and Hollywood filmmakers. His work broadened to include crisis intervention with the publication of guidelines for human service and child health care workers in large-scale natural disasters.

Throughout his career, Farberow was prolific in publishing his observations, research findings, and clinical insights. He wrote 16 books, 50 chapters, 93 articles, three monographs, four manuals, three brochures, 13 book reviews, six forewords, three Veterans Administration Medical Bulletins, and one module. His books and articles have been translated into Japanese, Finnish, German, Swedish, French, Spanish, and Korean. He edited, contributed to, and consulted with many periodicals over the years and remains active with six.

== Personal life and death ==
Farberow married Pearl (1925–2008), a teacher and counselor. They had a son and a daughter. Farberow died after a fall at the age of 97 on September 10, 2015, World Suicide Prevention Day.

== Legacy ==
The IASP established the Farberow Award, to recognize his treatment model for survivors of suicide by loved ones. It was inaugurated in 1997 and is presented to those who provide outstanding contributions in the field of bereavement and suicide survivors.

- Farberow's ingenuity has been influential internationally: in the doctrines of mental health clinics and educational institutions, and in virtually any community that relies on established protocol to address the problem of suicide. Farberow's penetrating insights, sincere vision, and lifelong perseverance helped turn this once heavily taboo-laden topic into a legitimate health concern, making resources available to people interested in suicide research, treatment, and prevention worldwide.

== Selected works ==
- Farberow, N. L., & Shneidman, E. S. (Eds.) (1961). The Cry for Help. New York: McGraw-Hill Book Company; (Japanese Translation) Tokyo: Charles E. Tuttle Company, 1968; (Spanish Translation) Mexico City: La Presna Medica Mexicana, 1969. ISBN 9780070199439
- Shneidman, E. S., & Farberow, N. L. (Eds.) (1957). Clues to Suicide. New York: McGraw-Hill Book Company; (Japanese Translation) Tokyo: Seishin Shobo Company, 1968. ISBN 9780070569812
- Farberow, N. L. (Ed.) (1980). The Many Faces of Suicide. New York: McGraw-Hill Book Company. ISBN 9780070199446
- Evans, G., & Farberow, N. L. (1988). Encyclopedia of Suicide. New York: Facts on File Publishing Co. ISBN 9780816045259
- Farberow, N. L. (Ed.) (1975). Suicide in Different Cultures. Baltimore, MD: University Park Press, 286 p. ISBN 9780839108436
- Reynolds, D. K., & Farberow, N. L. (1976). Suicide, Inside and Out. Los Angeles and Berkeley: University of California Press, 226 p. ISBN 9780520031036
- Reynolds, D. K., & Farberow, N. L. (1977). Endangered Hope: Experience in Psychiatric Aftercare Facilities. Los Angeles and Berkeley: University of California Press, 184 p.ISBN 9780520034570
- Reynolds, D. K., & Farberow, N. L. (1981). Family Shadow. Los Angeles and Berkeley: University of California Press, 177 p. ISBN 9780520042131
- Farberow, N. L., & Gordon, N. (1981). Manual for Child Health Workers in Major Disasters. Washington, D.C.: U.S. Government Printing Office, DHHS Publication No. (ADM) 81–1070.
- Maida, K., Gordon, N., & Farberow, N. L. (1989). The Crisis of Competence. Transitional Stress and the Displaced Worker. New York: Brunner-Mazell.
- Shneidman, E. S., Farberow, N. L., & Litman, R. E. (1994). The Psychology of Suicide (2nd ed.). Northvale, NJ: Jason Aronson, Inc. ISBN 9781568210575
