= George Murphy (disambiguation) =

George Murphy (1902–1992) was an American actor and politician.

George Murphy may also refer to:

- George W. Murphy (1841–1920), American politician, Attorney General of Arkansas
- George Murphy (footballer) (1915–1983), Welsh association footballer
- George Murphy (Canadian politician), Canadian politician, member of the Newfoundland and Labrador House of Assembly
- George Murphy (special effects artist), American special effects artist (Forrest Gump)
- George A. Murphy (1923–2015), American politician and judge in New York
- George B. Murphy Jr. (1906–1986), American newspaper editor, journalist, and civil rights leader
- George E. Murphy (1922–2022), American psychiatrist, suicidologist, and psychotherapy researcher
