= Logothetis =

Logothetis (Greek: Λογοθέτης) is a Greek surname derived from the Byzantine title of logothetes. The feminine form is Logotheti (Λογοθέτη).

- Alexandros Logothetis (born 1970), Greek actor
- Anestis Logothetis (1921–1994), Greek-Austrian composer
- Dimitri Logothetis, Greek-American actor and director
- George Logothetis (born 1975), Greek-British businessman
- Lykourgos Logothetis (1772–1850), leader of Samos during the Greek War of Independence
- Nikos Logothetis (born 1950), Greek biologist
