= IASP =

IASP may refer to:

- International Association for the Study of Pain
- International Association for Suicide Prevention
- International Association of Science Parks and Areas of Innovation, see Science park
