= David A. Brent =

American psychiatrist

- Born: Rochester, New York
- Education: Pennsylvania State University, Jefferson Medical College, University of Pittsburgh
- Scientific career
- Fields: Adolescent psychiatry, suicidology
- Workplaces: Western Psychiatric Institute and Clinic, University of Pittsburgh School of Medicine

David A. Brent is an American psychiatrist with expertise in child and adolescent psychiatry and suicidology. He is a Professor of Psychiatry, Pediatrics, and Epidemiology, and holds the Endowed Chair in Suicide Studies at the University of Pittsburgh School of Medicine. He also serves as the academic chief of Child and Adolescent Psychiatry at the Western Psychiatric Institute and Clinic.

== Education ==
Brent received his B.S. in General Science from Pennsylvania State University in 1972, his M.D. from Jefferson Medical College in 1974, and his M.S.Hyg. in Epidemiology from the University of Pittsburgh in 1987. He trained in pediatrics at the University of Colorado, and in general and child psychiatry at the Western Psychiatric Institute and Clinic.

== Career ==
Brent began working at Western Psychiatric Institute and Clinic in 1982 as a post-doctoral fellow. Since 1994, he has served as a professor of child psychiatry and pediatrics at the institute, and since 1995, as a professor of epidemiology at the University of Pittsburgh Graduate School of Public Health. He is also the co-founder and director of Services for Teens at Risk, a suicide prevention program for adolescents funded by the Commonwealth of Pennsylvania.

== Research ==
Brent's research focuses on the epidemiology of adolescent suicide and its associated risk factors, including firearms, substance abuse, and affective disorders. His findings have shown, for example, that 40 percent of children under the age of 16 who died by suicide did not have a clearly diagnosable psychiatric disorder, but did have access to a loaded gun at home. Another study found that adolescents who died by suicide were twice as likely to have lived in homes with firearms compared to those who attempted suicide but survived.
