= George E. Murphy =

American psychiatrist

George Earl Murphy (October 17, 1922 – 2022) was an American psychiatrist who made seminal contributions to research on suicide, psychotherapy, and alcoholism.

== Research and career ==
He was Professor Emeritus of Psychiatry at Washington University School of Medicine. Murphy was part of a team at Washington University that helped move American psychiatry toward evidence-based medicine. He is known for early controlled studies comparing psychotherapy vs pharmacotherapy for major depressive disorder. Atheoretical, practical psychotherapy, and Sex differences in suicide.

== Selected publications ==
- G. E. Murphy (1 July 1998). "Why women are less likely than men to commit suicide" (PDF). Comprehensive Psychiatry. 39 (4): 165–175. doi:10.1016/S0010-440X(98)90057-8. ISSN 0010-440X. PMID 9675500. Wikidata Q50874760.
- George Earl Murphy (1 January 1995). "39 years of suicide research: a personal view". Suicide and Life-Threatening Behavior. 25 (4): 450–457. ISSN 0363-0234. PMID 8928200. Wikidata Q48903014.
- G. E. MURPHY; A. L. BISNO; H. J. OGURA (1 November 1964). "Determinants of Rehabilitation Following Laryngectomy". The Laryngoscope. 74: 1534–1549. doi:10.1288/00005537-196411000-00002. ISSN 0023-852X. PMID 14224068. Wikidata Q52134741.
- Murphy GE; Wetzel RD (1 April 1990). "The lifetime risk of suicide in alcoholism". JAMA Psychiatry. 47 (4): 383–392. doi:10.1001/ARCHPSYC.1990.01810160083012. ISSN 2168-622X. PMID 2181963. Wikidata Q37912284.

== Awards and recognition ==
- Distinguished Life Fellow, American Psychiatric Association
- Research award for Advances in Suicide Prevention. American Suicide Foundation (now American Foundation for Suicide Prevention), 1994.
- Louis I. Dublin award for research in suicide. American Association of Suicidology, 1995.
