= CrisisLink =

US non-profit mental health hotline

- Purpose: Suicide prevention
- Headquarters: Arlington, Virginia
- Location: Arlington, Virginia
- Services: 24-hour crisis intervention and suicide prevention hotline
- Executive director: Wendy Gradison, PRS Inc CEO
- Website: prsinc.org/crisislink/

CrisisLink is a non-profit 24-hour mental health and suicide-prevention hot line based in Arlington, Virginia. Founded in 1969, CrisisLink fields more than 20,000 calls annually. The majority of calls to CrisisLink are fielded by trained volunteers. CrisisLink is part of the National Suicide Prevention Lifeline.

CrisisLink was founded in 1969 out of a church basement. It initially fielded calls on teen drug and relationship problems. Originally called the Arlington Hotline and then the Northern Virginia Hotline, in 1999 the name was changed to CrisisLink. After the September 11 attacks, CrisisLink set up a center at Virginia Hospital Center-Arlington and fielded 6,000 calls about potential victims in 48 hours. In 2003, the hotline won the American Association of Suicidology’s National Crisis Center Excellence Award.

In August 2014, CrisisLink announced its merger with Psychiatric Rehabilitation Services, another Arlington-area mental health nonprofit.
