= Archives of Suicide Research =

- Discipline: Suicidology
- Language: English
- Edited by: Rory O'Connor

Publication details
- History: 1995–present
- Publisher: Routledge
- Frequency: Quarterly
- Impact factor: 2.8 (2022)

Standard abbreviations
- ISO 4: Arch. Suicide Res.

Indexing
- CODEN: ASREFQ
- ISSN: 1381-1118 (print); 1543-6136 (web)
- OCLC no.: 782073966

Links
- Journal homepage; Online access

Archives of Suicide Research is a quarterly peer-reviewed academic journal covering suicidology. It was established in 1995 and is published by Routledge. It is the official journal of the International Academy of Suicide Research, both of which were founded by Dutch psychologist René Duekstra. The First/Founding editor-in-chief was Dutch-Canadian psychologist, Antoon A. Leenaars. The current editor-in-chief is Rory O'Connor (University of Glasgow, UK). According to the Journal Citation Reports, the journal has a 2022 impact factor of 2.8.
