= Australian Institute for Suicide Research and Prevention =

Australian national and international suicide prevention research centre

The Australian Institute for Suicide Research and Prevention (AISRAP) is a national and international suicide prevention research centre located at Griffith University in Mt. Gravatt, Queensland. According to its website, the institute is "dedicated to advancing research and learning in the field of suicide prevention" and provides training for health professionals as well as master's degrees in suicidology. The institute also manages a research facility providing outpatient treatment for people with suicidal ideation and/or recent history of suicidal behaviour.

== Foundation ==
The institute was developed in 1997 under the initial director, Professor Pierre Baume of Griffith University Faculty of Nursing and Health Sciences, who was its Foundation Dean. In 1998, Professor Diego De Leo AO, was appointed as director. AISRAP maintains a high-quality databank of Queensland resident suicide cases, which contains police investigations, and autopsy and toxicology reports.

== Institutional partnerships ==
In July 2005, AISRAP became a World Health Organization Collaborating Centre for Research and Training in Suicide Prevention.

In 2008 AISRAP was established as the National Centre of Excellence in Suicide Prevention, which is funded by the Commonwealth Government's Department of Health.

The Life Promotion Clinic is an agency of the Royal Australian and New Zealand College of Psychiatrists for Basic and Advanced Training (Psychotherapy).
