= Interpersonal theory of suicide =

Suicide theory of Thomas Joiner

The interpersonal theory of suicide attempts to explain why individuals engage in suicidal behavior and to identify individuals who are at risk. It was developed by Thomas Joiner and is outlined in Why People Die By Suicide. The theory consists of three components that together lead to suicide attempts. According to the theory, the simultaneous presence of thwarted belongingness and perceived burdensomeness produce the desire for suicide. While the desire for suicide is necessary, it alone will not result in death by suicide. Rather, Joiner asserts that one must also have acquired capability (that is, the acquired ability) to overcome one's natural fear of death.

A number of risk factors have been linked to suicidal behavior, and there are many theories of suicide that integrate these established risk factors, but few are capable of explaining all of the phenomena associated with suicidal behavior as the interpersonal theory of suicide does. Another strength of this theory lies in its ability to be tested empirically. It is constructed in a way that allows for falsifiability. A number of studies have found at least partial support for the interpersonal theory of suicide. Specifically, a systematic review of 66 studies using the interpersonal theory of suicide found that the effect of perceived burdensomeness on suicide ideation was the most tested and supported relationship. The theory’s other predictions, particularly in terms of critical interaction effects, are less strongly supported.

== Desire for suicide ==
=== Thwarted belongingness ===
Belongingness—feeling accepted by others—is believed to be a fundamental need, something that is essential for an individual's psychological health and well-being. Increased social connectedness—a construct related to belongingness—has been shown to lower risk for suicide. More specifically, being married, having children, and having more friends are associated with a lower risk of suicidal behavior. Additionally, "pulling together" (e.g., gathering for sporting events, celebrations) with others has been shown to have a preventive effect. For example, suicide rates have been lower on Super Bowl Sundays than other Sundays, and it is believed that the social connectedness that occurs from being a fan of a sport's team increases one's feeling of belongingness. In contrast, social isolation is frequently reported by those who die by suicide prior to death.

=== Perceived burdensomeness ===
Perceived burdensomeness is the extent to which an individual perceives themselves as a burden on others or society. Joiner describes perceived burdensomeness as the belief that "my death is worth more than my life". Unemployment, medical or health problems, and incarceration are examples of situations in which a person may feel like they are a burden to others. The burdensomeness is "perceived", and is often a false belief. According to the theory, thwarted belongingness and perceived burdensomeness together, when perceived as stable and unchanging (one is experiencing hopelessness regarding these states), is enough to give rise to active suicidal desire.

== Acquired capability ==
Joiner terms this "acquired" capability because it is not an ability with which humans are born. Rather, this ability to engage in suicidal behaviors is only acquired through life experiences. Fear of death is a natural and powerful instinct. According to the theory, one's fear of death is weakened when one is exposed to physical pain or provocative life experiences as these experiences often lead to fearlessness and pain insensitivity. These experiences could include childhood trauma, witnessing a traumatic event, suffering from a severe illness, or engaging in self-harm behaviors.

These behaviors are thought to result in the desensitization to painful stimuli and to increase one's ability to engage in suicidal behaviors. This component is important in identifying individuals who are likely to attempt or die by suicide. For example, certain professions (e.g., soldiers, surgeons, and police officers) are exposed to physical pain or provocative experiences. More specifically, soldiers with a history of combat have likely been exposed to grave injuries, witnessing the death of others, and are habituated to fear of painful experiences. This is consistent with data indicating an increased rate of suicide in soldiers. Additionally, past attempts of suicide has been found to be the number one predictor of future attempts. This is consistent with Joiner's theory; individuals who attempt suicide will habituate to the fear of death, and this weakened fear will make an individual more likely to make a subsequent attempt.

== Implications ==
A survey study of a large population-based cohort provides support for the interpersonal theory in that the interaction between thwarted belongingness and perceived burdensomeness predicted suicidal ideation, and suicidal ideation and ability predicted plans to attempt suicide and actual attempts.

The interpersonal theory of suicide identifies factors clinicians should assess for increased suicide risk and factors that should be targeted in prevention and treatment. Furthermore, the theory provides avenues of future research for scientists.

== See also ==
- Anomie
- Workism
