= René Diekstra =

Dutch psychologist

René F.W. Diekstra (born 20 July 1946, Sneek, the Netherlands) is a Dutch psychologist. Apart from being a scientist, he is also well known as an author of popular psychology books. He is the developer of many psychological programs for policy and well-being and writes for Dutch regional newspapers and several magazines. From 1987 to 1989, he was appointed manager of the programme on Psychosocial and Behavioral aspects of Health and Development of the World Health Organization in Geneva. He was also the founder of the International Academy of Suicide Research and the scientific journal Archives of Suicide Research. Diekstra became one of the foremost researchers in the field of suicidal behavior and author of many scientific papers and books in the field. He was also one of the first recipients of the Stengel Award, the world's most prestigious honor in the field of research on suicide.

He left Leiden University in 1997, after accusations of scientific plagiarism. The lawsuit was complicated by the fact that there was no solid definition of plagiarism available. From 2002 to 2011 Diekstra was head of the research group for Youth and Development at The Hague University of Applied Sciences. Between 2004 and 2011, he was head of the social science department and professor of psychology at the Roosevelt Academy (now: University College Roosevelt) in Middelburg, the Honors College of the University of Utrecht.
