= Anestis (surname) =

Anestis is a Greek surname (Greek: Ανέστης). Notable people with it include:

- Giannis Anestis (born 1991), Greek footballer
- Michael Anestis (born 1979), American psychologist and professor
