= Epidemiology of depression =

Demographics and prevelence of depression

The epidemiology of depression has been studied across the world. Depression is a major cause of morbidity and mortality worldwide, as the epidemiology has shown. Lifetime prevalence estimates vary widely, from 3% in Japan to 17% in India. Epidemiological data shows higher rates of depression in the Middle East, North Africa, South Asia and the United States than in other regions and countries. For most countries among the 10 studied, the number of people who experience depression during their lifetimes falls within an 8–12% range.

In North America, the probability of having a major depressive episode within any year-long period is 3–5% for males and 8–10% for females.

== Demographic dynamics ==
Population studies have consistently shown major depression to be about twice as common in women as in men, although it is not yet clear why this is so. The relative increase in occurrence is related to pubertal development rather than chronological age, reaches adult ratios between the ages of 15 and 18, and appears associated with psychosocial more than hormonal factors.

People are most likely to suffer their first depressive episode between the ages of 30 and 40, and there is a second, smaller peak of incidence between ages 50 and 60. The risk of major depression is increased with neurological conditions such as stroke, Parkinson's disease, or multiple sclerosis and during the first year after childbirth. The risk of major depression has also been related to environmental stressors faced by population groups such as war combatants or physicians in training.

It is also more common after cardiovascular illnesses, and is related to a poor outcome of cardiovascular diseases. Studies conflict on the prevalence of depression in the elderly, but most data suggest there is a reduction in this age group. Depressive disorders are more common in urban than in rural populations and, in general, the prevalence is higher in groups with adverse socio-economic factors (for example in homeless people).

Data on the relative prevalence of major depression among different ethnic groups have reached no clear consensus. However, the only known study to have covered dysthymia in the US specifically found it to be more common in African and Mexican Americans than in European Americans.

Projections indicate that depression may be the second leading cause of life lost after heart disease by 2020.

In 2016, a study, published by JAMA Psychiatry, and written by Charlotte Wessel Skovlund, found an association between hormonal contraception and depression.

== By country and category ==
Age-standardised disability-adjusted life year (DALY) rates per 10,000 inhabitants in 2017.

Category	1990	2017	Absolute change	Relative change
Afghanistan	439.81	443.57	+3.75	<1%
Albania	306.48	308.44	+1.96	<1%
Algeria	454.02	455.36	+1.34	<1%
American Samoa	299.00	301.44	+2.43	<1%
Andean Latin America	395.14	395.61	+0.47	<1%
Andorra	462.69	466.65	+3.96	<1%
Angola	300.38	307.07	+6.68	+2%
Antigua and Barbuda	423.69	423.07	–0.63	>–1%
Argentina	554.67	555.27	+0.60	<1%
Armenia	235.57	235.64	+0.07	<1%
Australasia	588.29	588.66	+0.36	<1%
Australia	564.71	564.13	–0.58	>–1%
Austria	473.10	470.30	–2.81	>–1%
Azerbaijan	237.12	235.03	–2.09	>–1%
Bahamas	426.25	425.91	–0.34	>–1%
Bahrain	428.36	426.75	–1.61	>–1%
Bangladesh	390.09	399.43	+9.34	+2%
Barbados	427.13	425.42	–1.71	>–1%
Belarus	262.09	261.92	–0.16	>–1%
Belgium	454.81	453.91	–0.90	>–1%
Belize	417.94	421.10	+3.16	<1%
Benin	270.23	272.67	+2.43	<1%
Bermuda	425.79	426.62	+0.83	<1%
Bhutan	348.85	351.02	+2.17	<1%
Bolivia	393.70	393.43	–0.27	>–1%
Bosnia and Herzegovina	308.44	307.51	–0.92	>–1%
Botswana	321.91	319.57	–2.34	>–1%
Brazil	513.45	554.75	+41.30	+8%
Brunei	315.25	318.63	+3.37	+1%
Bulgaria	325.36	325.40	+0.04	<1%
Burkina Faso	269.71	273.79	+4.07	+2%
Burundi	340.21	335.02	–5.19	–2%
Cambodia	306.36	306.09	–0.26	>–1%
Cameroon	269.81	271.78	+1.97	<1%
Canada	484.22	450.76	–33.46	–7%
Cape Verde	278.10	274.58	–3.52	–1%
Caribbean	422.38	421.72	–0.66	>–1%
Central African Republic	300.76	303.45	+2.69	<1%
Central Asia	235.74	234.85	–0.89	>–1%
Central Europe	307.09	306.99	–0.09	>–1%
Central Europe, Eastern Europe, and Central Asia	271.76	268.25	–3.51	–1%
Central Latin America	264.02	270.29	+6.27	+2%
Central Sub-Saharan Africa	300.88	304.43	+3.55	+1%
Chad	270.61	269.81	-0.80	>–1%
Chile	553.66	550.58	–3.08	>–1%
China	289.57	275.39	–14.18	–5%
Colombia	244.81	230.00	–14.81	–6%
Comoros	334.19	339.17	+4.98	+1%
Congo	303.07	304.40	+1.33	<1%
Costa Rica	264.62	267.24	+2.62	<1%
Côte d'Ivoire	266.99	269.37	+2.38	<1%
Croatia	310.58	309.13	–1.45	>–1%
Cuba	421.37	421.70	+0.33	<1%
Cyprus	470.31	472.29	+1.98	<1%
Czechia	309.12	307.16	–1.96	>–1%
Democratic Republic of Congo	300.71	303.61	+2.90	<1%
Denmark	470.42	469.49	–0.93	>–1%
Djibouti	327.85	330.88	+3.03	<1%
Dominica	422.36	418.16	–4.20	>–1%
Dominican Republic	424.23	420.58	–3.65	>–1%
East Asia	290.12	276.32	–13.80	–5%
Eastern Europe	262.88	262.56	–0.32	>–1%
Eastern Sub-Saharan Africa	336.34	340.89	+4.55	+1%
Ecuador	395.69	396.44	+0.75	<1%
Egypt	398.29	398.86	+0.57	<1%
El Salvador	266.25	270.06	+3.81	+1%
England	395.05	395.14	+0.09	<1%
Equatorial Guinea	304.76	303.81	-0.94	>–1%
Eritrea	331.15	339.69	+8.54	+3%
Estonia	261.91	261.21	-0.70	>–1%
Eswatini	322.64	318.73	–3.90	–1%
Ethiopia	347.39	349.31	+1.92	<1%
Fiji	299.92	300.46	+0.54	<1%
Finland	333.44	329.68	–3.76	–1%
France	576.00	576.03	+0.03	<1%
Gabon	303.27	306.57	+3.31	+1%
Gambia	268.55	271.49	+2.94	+1%
Georgia	238.24	235.38	–2.87	–1%
Germany	564.54	565.03	+0.48	<1%
Ghana	272.17	274.68	+2.51	<1%
Greece	512.06	511.19	–0.87	>–1%
Greenland	492.10	500.98	+8.89	+2%
Grenada	423.74	417.51	–6.23	–1%
Guam	299.44	301.30	+1.86	<1%
Guatemala	263.12	267.56	+4.45	+2%
Guinea	271.79	273.08	+1.29	<1%
Guinea-Bissau	271.17	272.76	+1.59	<1%
Guyana	418.26	420.11	+1.84	<1%
Haiti	417.74	420.25	+2.50	<1%
High SDI	462.62	463.66	+1.04	<1%
High-income	489.63	494.52	+4.89	<1%
High-income Asia Pacific	318.28	318.18	–0.10	>–1%
High-middle SDI	329.26	342.11	+12.86	+4%
Honduras	264.60	266.37	+1.77	<1%
Hungary	308.84	309.31	+0.47	<1%
Iceland	469.33	469.26	–0.06	>–1%
India	309.28	306.76	–2.53	>–1%
Indonesia	304.31	304.18	–0.12	>–1%
Iran	689.12	692.26	–6.25	>–1%
Iraq	427.22	430.09	+2.87	<1%
Ireland	506.29	511.29	+5.00	<1%
Israel	274.39	274.00	–0.40	>–1%
Italy	512.79	499.21	–13.58	–3%
Jamaica	424.62	422.32	–2.30	>–1%
Japan	257.27	224.62	–12.69	>–1%
Jordan	447.61	445.91	–1.70	>–1%
Kazakhstan	235.88	236.01	+0.13	<1%
Kenya	337.41	339.52	+2.10	<1%
Kiribati	302.20	303.25	+1.04	<1%
Kuwait	430.22	444.44	+14.22	+3%
Kyrgyzstan	235.31	235.09	–0.22	>–1%
Laos	388.45	390.62	+2.17	<1%
Latin America and Caribbean	393.06	405.65	+12.59	+3%
Latvia	261.95	261.48	–0.46	>–1%
Lebanon	545.72	547.07	+1.35	<1%
Lesotho	320.94	318.40	–2.54	>–1%
Liberia	266.73	267.44	+0.71	<1%
Libya	443.86	449.94	+6.08	+1%
Lithuania	261.63	261.43	–0.19	>–1%
Low SDI	326.04	329.76	+3.72	+1%
Low-middle SDI	332.91	337.68	+4.77	+1%
Luxembourg	468.43	467.04	–1.39	>–1%
Madagascar	332.44	336.98	+4.53	+1%
Malawi	335.11	341.69	+6.58	+2%
Malaysia	392.10	389.83	–2.26	>–1%
Maldives	295.24	291.29	–3.96	–1%
Mali	268.90	270.70	+1.80	<1%
Malta	472.67	468.46	–4.21	>–1%
Marshall Islands	299.32	299.31	–0.02	>–1%
Mauritania	272.46	273.97	+1.51	<1%
Mauritius	303.11	302.78	–0.33	>–1%
Mexico	271.36	289.05	+17.69	+7%
Micronesia (country)	299.20	299.84	+0.64	<1%
Middle SDI	306.44	306.98	+0.54	<1%
Moldova	260.72	261.03	+0.31	<1%
Mongolia	233.62	234.85	+1.23	<1%
Montenegro	309.18	308.71	–0.47	>–1%
Morocco	452.71	453.82	+1.11	<1%
Mozambique	336.20	341.61	+5.41	+2%
Myanmar	300.93	307.06	+6.13	+2%
Namibia	320.84	322.18	+1.34	<1%
Nepal	348.75	359.13	+10.38	+3%
Netherlands	579.45	578.84	–0.62	>–1%
New Zealand	705.21	722.98	+17.77	+3%
Nicaragua	264.58	265.73	+1.15	<1%
Niger	271.34	272.82	+1.47	<1%
Nigeria	268.96	272.57	+3.61	+1%
North Africa and Middle East	448.40	450.80	+2.39	<1%
North America	561.85	561.25	–0.60	>–1%
North Korea	304.06	297.84	–6.22	–2%
North Macedonia	308.26	307.40	–0.86	>–1%
Northern Ireland	651.12	660.19	+9.07	+1%
Northern Mariana Islands	296.39	300.91	+4.52	+2%
Norway	673.49	665.89	–7.59	–1%
Oceania	296.33	297.51	+1.18	<1%
Oman	421.68	413.70	–7.97	–2%
Pakistan	349.19	353.29	+4.10	+1%
Palestine	455.01	451.42	–3.59	>–1%
Panama	263.33	264.25	+0.92	<1%
Papua New Guinea	294.77	296.24	+1.48	<1%
Paraguay	553.15	552.96	–0.19	>–1%
Peru	395.29	395.88	+0.59	<1%
Philippines	302.25	302.49	+0.24	<1%
Poland	309.40	309.37	–0.04	>–1%
Portugal	472.59	473.61	+1.01	<1%
Puerto Rico	427.30	425.85	–1.45	>–1%
Qatar	403.81	391.06	–12.75	–3%
Romania	292.12	292.61	+0.49	<1%
Russia	262.99	262.58	–0.42	>–1%
Rwanda	338.57	343.75	+5.18	+2%
Saint Lucia	424.55	421.42	–3.13	>–1%
Saint Vincent and the Grenadines	421.10	417.18	–3.92	>–1%
Samoa	299.55	300.51	+0.96	<1%
São Tomé and Príncipe	273.98	273.61	–0.37	>–1%
Saudi Arabia	430.80	435.29	+4.49	+1%
Scotland	421.09	419.01	–2.08	>–1%
Senegal	271.34	271.99	+0.66	<1%
Serbia	308.40	307.93	–0.47	>–1%
Seychelles	305.21	300.90	–4.30	–1%
Sierra Leone	271.01	270.96	–0.05	>–1%
Singapore	319.22	326.20	+6.98	+2%
Slovakia	309.64	309.22	–0.42	>–1%
Slovenia	309.55	306.52	–3.03	>-1%
Solomon Islands	296.00	298.91	+2.91	<1%
Somalia	327.47	333.31	+5.84	+2%
South Africa	367.94	365.43	–2.51	>–1%
South Asia	320.86	320.95	+0.09	<1%
South Korea	338.46	335.96	–2.50	>–1%
South Sudan	317.40	329.08	+11.67	+4%
Southeast Asia	291.86	292.91	+1.05	<1%
Southeast Asia, East Asia, and Oceania	289.93	280.40	–9.53	–3%
Southern Latin America	554.25	554.08	–0.18	>–1%
Southern Sub-Saharan Africa	349.41	348.08	–1.33	>–1%
Spain	444.92	463.69	+18.77	+4%
Sri Lanka	301.85	307.85	+6.00	+2%
Sub-Saharan Africa	307.47	308.98	+1.51	<1%
Sudan	452.15	452.80	+0.65	<1%
Suriname	419.61	421.18	+1.57	<1%
Sweden	469.30	467.41	–1.89	>–1%
Switzerland	468.85	468.55	–0.30	>–1%
Syria	452.10	453.39	+1.29	<1%
Taiwan	307.25	306.89	–0.36	>–1%
Tajikistan	234.35	232.74	–1.62	>–1%
Tanzania	335.95	341.24	+5.30	+2%
Thailand	305.63	306.91	+1.28	<1%
Timor	295.90	300.52	+4.63	+2%
Togo	272.10	274.16	+2.05	<1%
Tonga	302.76	302.51	–0.25	>–1%
Trinidad and Tobago	419.97	419.20	–0.77	>–1%
Tropical Latin America	514.41	554.73	+40.32	+8%
Tunisia	455.67	459.67	+4.00	<1%
Turkey	342.96	352.71	+9.74	+3%
Turkmenistan	236.15	233.30	–2.85	–1%
Uganda	317.76	330.35	+12.59	+4%
Ukraine	263.10	262.92	–0.18	>–1%
United Arab Emirates	390.77	386.30	–4.46	–1%
United Kingdom	406.06	406.09	+0.03	<1%
United States	570.31	573.38	+3.06	<1%
United States Virgin Islands	428.12	428.10	–0.02	>–1%
Uruguay	555.13	557.10	+1.96	<1%
Uzbekistan	234.56	234.50	–0.05	>–1%
Vanuatu	295.97	298.94	+2.97	+1%
Venezuela	265.18	264.86	–0.32	>–1%
Vietnam	192.79	192.17	–0.62	>–1%
Wales	423.11	421.79	–1.32	>–1%
Western Europe	502.89	499.26	–3.63	>–1%
Western Sub-Saharan Africa	269.65	272.36	+2.70	+1%
World	348.53	345.69	–2.84	>–1%
Yemen	442.49	446.34	+3.85	<1%
Zambia	334.01	337.31	+3.30	<1%
Zimbabwe	286.38	286.72	+0.34	<1%

== See also ==
- Prevalence of mental disorders
