= Crisis (journal) =

- Discipline: Suicidology
- Language: English, French, German
- Edited by: Thomas Niederkrotenthaler

Publication details
- History: 1980–present
- Publisher: Hogrefe Publishing
- Frequency: Quarterly
- Impact factor: 3.0 (2025)

Standard abbreviations
- ISO 4: Crisis

Indexing
- ISSN: 0227-5910

Links
- Journal homepage; Online access; Online archive

Crisis: The Journal of Crisis Intervention and Suicide Prevention is a quarterly peer-reviewed academic journal covering suicidology, the study of suicide. It was established in 1980 and is published by Hogrefe Publishing under the auspices of the International Association for Suicide Prevention. The editor-in-chief is Thomas Niederkrotenthaler (Medical University Vienna). The journal has a 2025 impact factor of 3.0.
