= Thomas Joiner =

American academic psychologist

Thomas Ellis Joiner Jr.
- Born: June 7, 1965 (age 61); Atlanta, Georgia, U.S.
- Education: Princeton University, University of Texas at Austin
- Known for: The interpersonal theory of suicide
- Awards: James McKeen Cattell Fellow Award (2020)
- Scientific career
- Fields: Psychology
- Workplaces: Florida State University
- Doctoral advisor: Gerald I. Metalsky, Ph.D.

Thomas Joiner is an American academic psychologist and leading expert on suicide. He is the Robert O. Lawton Professor of Psychology at Florida State University, where he operates his Laboratory for the Study of the Psychology and Neurobiology of Mood Disorders, Suicide, and Related Conditions. He is author of Why People Die by Suicide (Harvard University Press 2005) and Myths about Suicide (Harvard University Press 2010), and the current editor-in-chief of Suicide and Life-Threatening Behavior.

In Why People Die by Suicide, Joiner posits the interpersonal theory of suicide, a three-part explanation of suicide which focuses on ability and desire. The desire to die by suicide comes from a sense of disconnection from others and lack of belonging, combined with a belief that one is a burden on others. The ability to die by suicide comes from a gradual desensitization to violence and a decreased fear of pain, combined with technical competence in one or more suicide methods. Under this model, a combination of desire and ability will precede most serious suicide attempts.

Joiner holds a Ph.D. from the University of Texas at Austin.

In 2023, Joiner appeared on the history-centered podcast, Out of the Box with Jonathan Russo.
