= Anestis Chatziliadis =

Greek footballer (born 1991)

Personal information
- Date of birth: 17 February 1991 (age 35)
- Place of birth: Thessaloniki, Greece
- Height: 1.72 m (5 ft 8 in)
- Position: Right back

Team information
- Current team: Irodotos
- Number: 77

Senior career*
Years	Team	Apps	(Gls)
2011	Iraklis	0	(0)
2011–2012	Doxa Kranoula	19	(0)
2013	Tilikratis	9	(0)
2014–2015	Agrotikos Asteras	8	(0)
2015	Apollon Kalamarias	11	(0)
2015–2016	Chania	22	(1)
2016–2017	Lokomotiv Sofia	17	(0)
2017–2018	Agrotikos Asteras	0	(0)
2018	Langadas	12	(0)
2019–	Irodotos	11	(0)
- * Club domestic league appearances and goals as of 25 June 2019

Anestis Chatziliadis (Greek: Ανέστης Χατζηλιάδης; born 17 February 1991) is a Greek footballer who plays as a defender for Irodotos.

== Career ==
On 7 September 2016, Chatziliadis signed with Lokomotiv Sofia but was released in June 2017.

In August 2017, Chatziliadis signed with Agrotikos Asteras.
