= Erwin Ringel =

Austrian psychiatrist and neurologist (1921–1994)

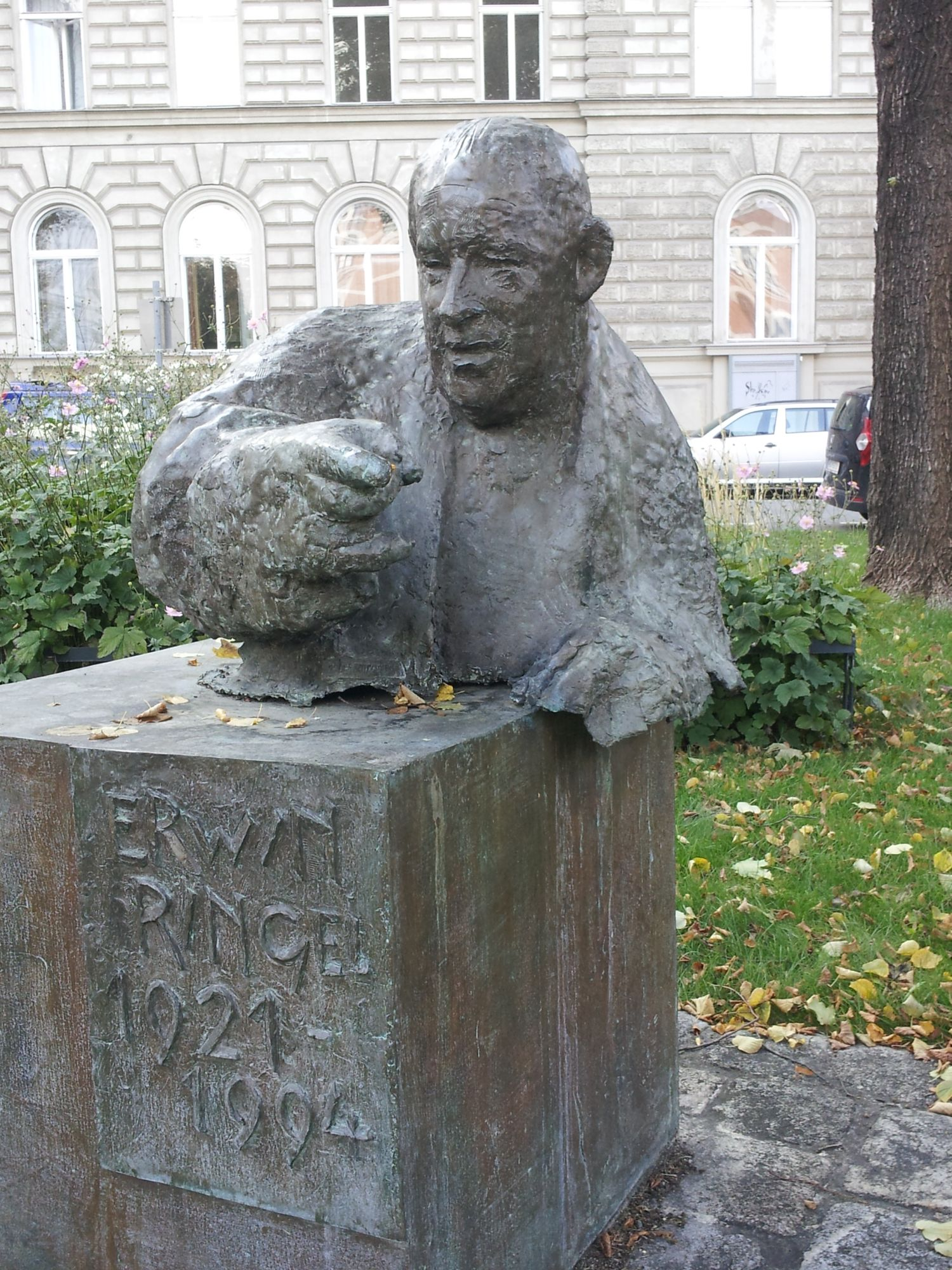
Erwin Ringel

Erwin Ringel (27 April 1921 – 28 July 1994) was an Austrian psychiatrist and neurologist who dedicated his life to suicide prevention and who, in 1960, defined the presuicidal syndrome.

In 1948 he founded the world's first suicide prevention center in Vienna. In 1960 he founded the International Association for Suicide Prevention.

== Childhood and early life ==
Erwin Ringel was born in Timișoara, Romania to a Banat Swabian family, nonetheless his parents already lived in Hollabrunn, Austria.

In 1926 his family moved to Vienna. In 1939, he was briefly arrested by the Gestapo; he was then drafted into the German army where he served in the medical corps until he was discharged on medical grounds.

== Career ==
Ringel studied at the University of Vienna and graduated with a degree in medicine in 1946; he then studied psychiatry, psychology and neurology.

In 1954, he created the first psychosomatic ward in Austria, and in 1978 he co-founded the Austrian Society for Clinical Psychosomatic Medicine.

He was Professor of Medical Psychology at the University of Vienna from 1981 to 1991; he also published over 600 articles on psychology.

In 1984 he published The Austrian Soul which went on to became a bestseller.

In later life he was diagnosed with multiple sclerosis. He died from a heart attack in Austria on 28 July 1994.

The ‘Ringel Service Award’ was created in his honour.

== Honours and awards ==
- 1961: Karl Renner Vienna's prize for achievement in suicide prevention
- 1985: Honorary President of the International Association for Suicide Prevention
- 1986: Austrian Cross of Honour for Science and Art, 1st class
- 1986: Gold Medal for services to the City of Vienna
- 1988: Hans-Prinzhorn Medal
