= Suicide and Life-Threatening Behavior =

- Discipline: Psychiatry
- Language: English
- Edited by: Thomas Joiner

Publication details
- History: 1971-present
- Publisher: Wiley-Blackwell on behalf of the American Association of Suicidology
- Frequency: Bimonthly
- Impact factor: 2.5 (2025)

Standard abbreviations
- ISO 4: Suicide Life-Threat. Behav.
- NLM: Suicide Life Threat Behav

Indexing
- ISSN: 1943-278X
- OCLC no.: 645274714

Links
- Journal homepage; Online access; Online archive

Suicide and Life-Threatening Behavior is a peer-reviewed academic journal published six times per year by Wiley-Blackwell on behalf of the American Association of Suicidology. The journal was established in 1971 by Edwin S. Shneidman. Its current editor-in-chief is Thomas Joiner (Florida State University). The journal covers scientific research on suicidal and other life-threatening behaviors, including risk factors for suicide, ethical issues in intervention research, and mental health needs of those bereaved by suicide.

According to the Journal Citation Reports, the journal has a 2011 impact factor of 1.333, ranking it 45th out of 125 journals in the category "Psychology Multidisciplinary" and 60th out of 117 journals in the category "Psychiatry (Social Science)".
