= Anestis Logothetis =

Anestis Logothetis (27 October 1921 – 6 January 1994) was a Greek avant-garde composer, noted both for his musical works and his invention of his own graphic notation system.

== Biography ==
Logothetis was born in Burgas, Bulgaria, of Greek parents, and moved with his family to Thessaloniki in 1934. After graduating from the German School of Thessaloniki, he left Greece in 1942 in order to study engineering at Vienna Polytechnic Institute. However, his interests soon turned to music, and he began studying composition at the Vienna Academy of Music, graduating with distinction in 1951. He was granted Austrian citizenship in 1952, and married that year.

Logothetis then worked as a private music tutor. He received several scholarships to study composition in Rome, and took part in the Darmstädter Ferienkurse on modern music, where he became influenced by modern composers such as John Cage, Earle Brown, and Bruno Maderna. Initially he wrote a number of works using conventional musical notation and different combinations of instruments and orchestrations. Around 1957, he started developing electronic music in Gottfried Michael Koenig's studio in Cologne, producing his composition Fantasmata in 1960.

By the late 1950s, he also developed his own system of graphic notation incorporating visual symbols, relying on their interpretation and improvisation by performers. It is said that "Logothetis employs this system to different ways of imprinting the contemporary sound on the score in order to express the sense of space in musical notation and redefine the roles of the composer, the performer and the audience, during the composition and performance of a piece."

He produced works for orchestral ensembles as well as electronic and multimedia music, and a series of radio operas. He composed his first computer-based work, Wellenformen, in 1981 in Stockholm. Concerts of his work have taken place throughout Europe, the USA and Asia.

Logothetis died of cancer in Vienna in 1994.
