= Prevalence of mental disorders =

Worldwide prevalence of mental health disorders

Share with mental and substance disorders

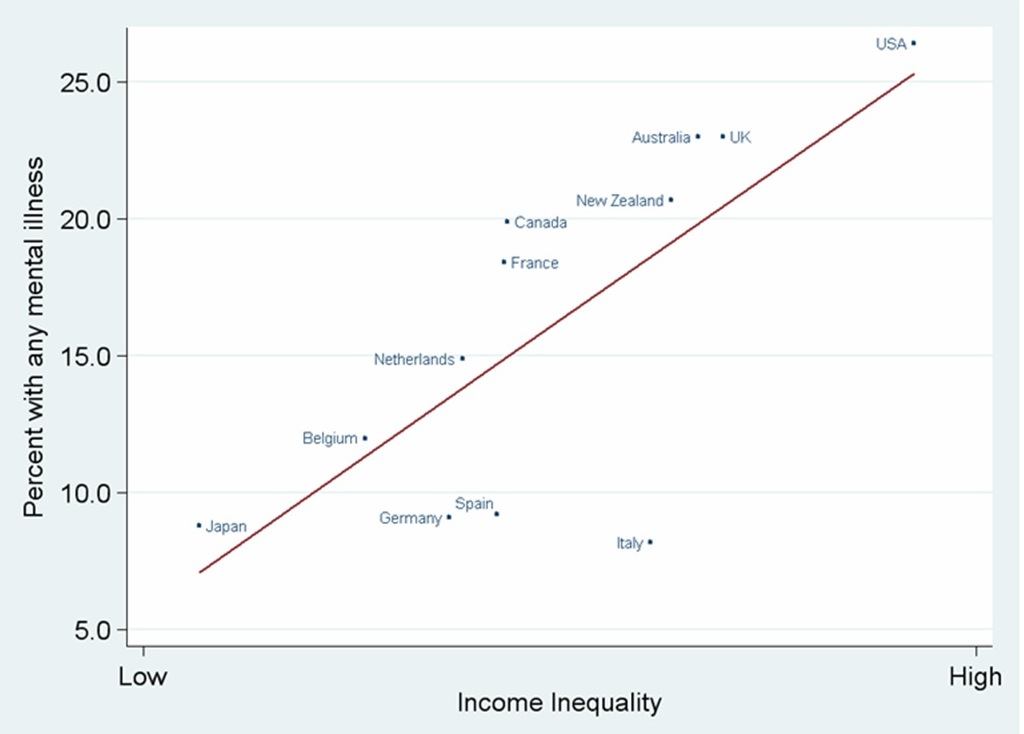
The prevalence of mental illness is higher in more unequal rich countries

The prevalence of mental disorders has been studied around the world, providing estimates on how common mental disorders are. Different criteria or thresholds of severity have sometimes been used.

National and international figures are typically estimated by large-scale surveys of self-reported symptoms up to the time of assessment; sometimes a figure is calculated for the occurrence of disorder in the week, month or year prior to assessment–a point or period prevalence; sometimes the figure is for a person's lifetime prior to assessment–the so-called lifetime prevalence.

== Population studies ==
Numerous large-scale surveys of the prevalence of mental disorders in adults in the general population have been carried out since the 1980s based on self-reported symptoms assessed by standardized structured interviews, usually carried out over the phone.

Mental disorders have been found to be common, with over a third of people in most countries reporting sufficient criteria to be diagnosed at some point in their life. The World Health Organization (WHO) reported in 2001 that about 450 million people worldwide have some form of mental disorder or brain condition, and that one in four people meet criteria at some point in their life.

=== World Health Organization global study ===
Prevalence by mental and substance use disorder.

The World Health Organization is currently undertaking a global survey of 26 countries in all regions of the world, based on ICD and DSM criteria. The first published figures on the 14 country surveys completed to date, indicate that, of those disorders assessed, anxiety disorders are the most common in all but 1 country (prevalence in the prior 12-month period of 2.4% to 18.2%) and mood disorders next most common in all but 2 countries (12-month prevalence of 0.8% to 9.6%), while substance disorders (0.1–6.4%) and impulse-control disorders (0.0–6.8%) were consistently less prevalent.

The United States, Colombia, the Netherlands and Ukraine tended to have higher prevalence estimates across most classes of disorder, while Nigeria, Shanghai and Italy were consistently low, and prevalence was lower in Asian countries in general. Cases of disorder were rated as mild (prevalence of 1.8–9.7%), moderate (prevalence of 0.5–9.4%) and serious (prevalence of 0.4–7.7%).

The World Health Organization has published worldwide incidence and prevalence estimates of individual disorders. Obsessive-compulsive disorder is two to three times as common in Latin America, Africa, and Europe as in Asia and Oceania. Schizophrenia appears to be most common in Japan, Oceania, and Southeastern Europe and least common in Africa. Bipolar disorder and panic disorder have very similar rates around the world.

However, these are widely believed to be underestimates, due to poor diagnosis (especially in countries without affordable access to mental health services) and low reporting rates, in part because of the predominant use of self-report data, rather than semi-structured instruments such as the Structured Clinical Interview for DSM-IV (SCID); actual lifetime prevalence rates for mental disorders are estimated to be between 65% and 85%.

=== US mental health studies ===
Previous widely cited large-scale surveys in the US were the Epidemiological Catchment Area (ECA) survey and subsequent National Comorbidity Survey (NCS). The NCS was replicated and updated between 2000 and 2003 and indicated that, of those groups of disorders assessed, nearly half of Americans (46.4%) reported meeting criteria at some point in their life for either a DSM-IV anxiety disorder (28.8%), mood disorder (20.8%), impulse-control disorder (24.8%) or substance use disorders (14.6%). Half of all lifetime cases had started by age 14 and three quarters by age 24.

In the prior 12-month period only, around a quarter (26.2%) met criteria for any disorder—anxiety disorders 18.1%; mood disorders 9.5%; impulse control disorders 8.9%; and substance use disorders 3.8%. A substantial minority (23%) met criteria for more than two disorders. 22.3% of cases were classed as serious, 37.3% as moderate and 40.4% as mild.

=== European population studies ===
A 2004 cross-European study found that approximately one in four people reported meeting criteria at some point in their life for one of the DSM-IV disorders assessed, which included mood disorders (13.9%), anxiety disorders (13.6%) or alcohol disorder (5.2%). Approximately one in ten met criteria within a 12-month period. Women and younger people of either gender showed more cases of disorder.

A 2005 review of 27 studies have found that 27% of adult Europeans are or have been affected by at least one mental disorder in the past 12 months. It was also found that the most frequent disorders were anxiety disorders, depressive, somatoform and substance dependence disorders.

== Specific mental disorders ==
=== Anxiety disorders ===
A review that pooled surveys in different countries up to 2004 found overall average prevalence estimates for any anxiety disorder of 10.6% (in the 12 months prior to assessment) and 16.6% (in lifetime prior to assessment), but that rates for individual disorders varied widely. Women had generally higher prevalence rates than men, but the magnitude of the difference varied.

=== Mood disorders ===
A review that pooled surveys of mood disorders in different countries up to 2000 found 12-month prevalence rates of 4.1% for major depressive disorder (MDD), 2% for dysthymic disorder and 0.72% for bipolar 1 disorder. The average lifetime prevalence found was 6.7% for MDD (with a relatively low lifetime prevalence rate in higher-quality studies, compared to the rates typically highlighted of 5–12% for men and 10–25% for women), and rates of 3.6% for dysthymia and 0.8% for Bipolar 1. Certain population subgroups, such as physicians in training, have 12-month prevalence rates as high as 21 to 43%.

=== Schizophrenia ===
A 2005 review of prior surveys in 46 countries on the prevalence of schizophrenic disorders, including a prior 10-country WHO survey, found an average (median) figure of 0.4% for lifetime prevalence up to the point of assessment and 0.3% in the 12-month period prior to assessment. A related figure not given in other studies (known as lifetime morbid risk), reported to be an accurate statement of how many people would theoretically develop schizophrenia at any point in life regardless of time of assessment, was found to be "about seven to eight individuals per 1,000" (0.7/0.8%). The prevalence of schizophrenia was consistently lower in poorer countries than in richer countries (though not the incidence), but the prevalence did not differ between urban/rural areas or men/women (although incidence did).

=== Personality disorders ===
Studies of the prevalence of personality disorders (PDs) have been fewer and smaller-scale, but a broader Norwegian survey found a similar overall prevalence of almost 1 in 7 (13.4%), based on meeting personality criteria over the prior five-year period. Rates for specific disorders ranged from 0.8% to 2.8%, with rates differing across countries, and by gender, educational level and other factors. A US survey that incidentally screened for personality disorder found an overall rate of 14.79%.

=== Child psychiatric disorders ===
Approximately 7% of a preschool pediatric sample were given a psychiatric diagnosis in one clinical study, and approximately 10% of 1- and 2-year-olds receiving developmental screening have been assessed as having significant emotional/behavioral problems based on parent and pediatrician reports.

== See also ==
- Psychiatric epidemiology
