= Edwin S. Shneidman =

American clinical psychologist, suicidologist & thanatologist (1918–2009)

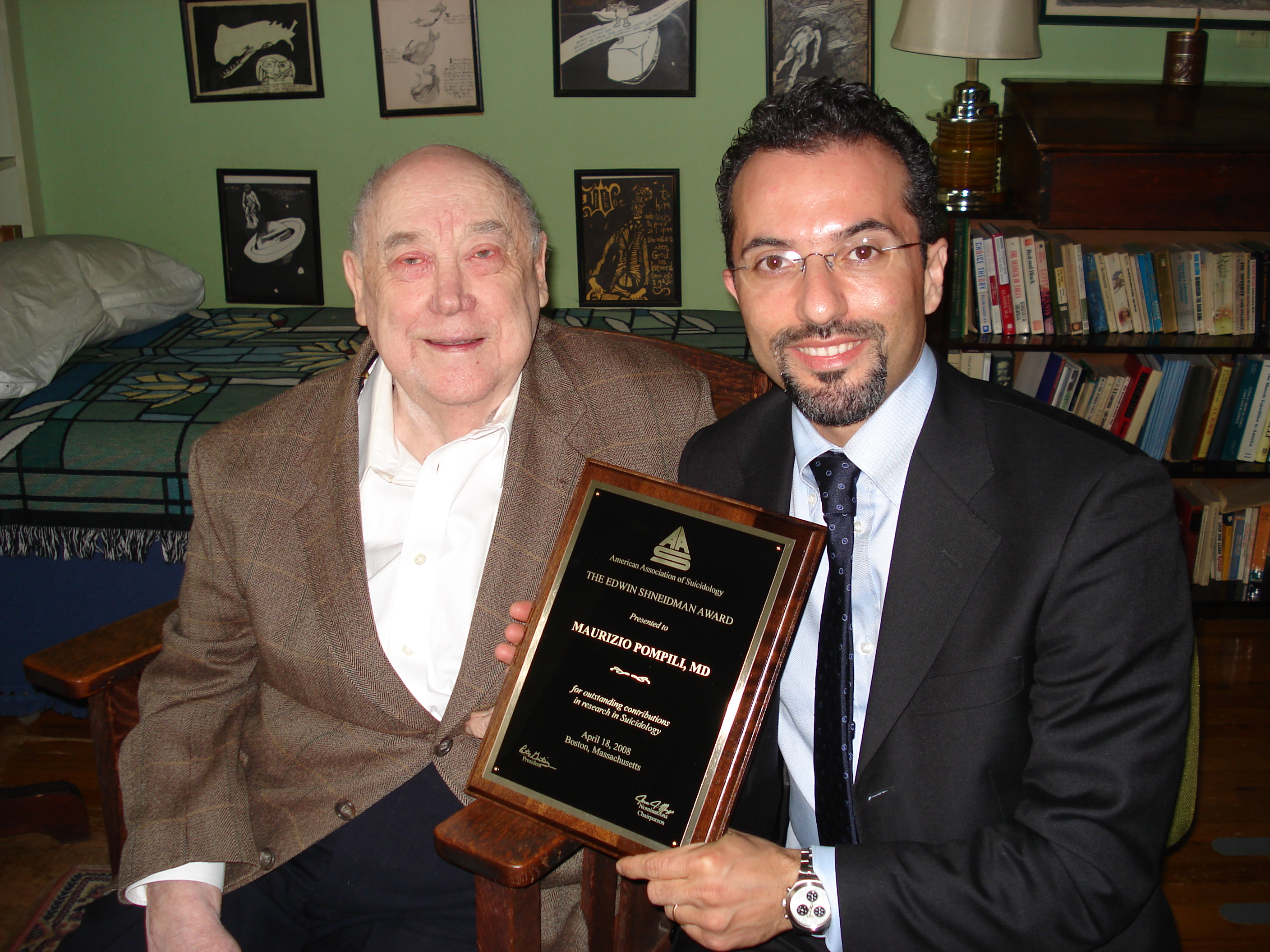
- Edwin Shneidman (left) with Maurizio Pompili, who was the recipient of the 2008 Shneidman Award
- Born: May 13, 1918; York, Pennsylvania
- Died: May 15, 2009 (aged 91); Los Angeles, California
- Education: University of California, Los Angeles
- Known for: Contributions to the development of suicidology
- Scientific career
- Fields: Psychology; Suicidology

Edwin S. Shneidman (May 13, 1918 – May 15, 2009) was an American clinical psychologist, suicidologist and thanatologist. Together with Norman Farberow and Robert Litman, in 1958, he founded the Los Angeles Suicide Prevention Center where the men were instrumental in researching suicide and developing a crisis center and treatment for preventing deaths.

In 1968, Shneidman founded the American Association of Suicidology and the principal United States journal for suicide studies, Suicide and Life-Threatening Behavior. In 1970, he became Professor of Thanatology at the University of California, where he taught for decades. He published 20 books on suicide and its prevention.

== Early life and education ==
Shneidman was born in York, Pennsylvania in 1918 to Russian Jewish immigrants. His father was a merchant with a department store. As a child, Shneidman attended local public schools.

He went to the University of California Los Angeles (UCLA) for undergraduate and graduate work, earning a master's degree in psychology in 1940. His education was interrupted by World War II, and he served in the Army.

Afterward, Shneidman returned to graduate school, earning a doctorate in clinical psychology from the University of Southern California (USC). As an intern, he studied schizophrenia, then thought to be environmentally caused, at the Veterans Administration hospital in Brentwood. He was an atheist.

== Career ==
In the late 1940s, Shneidman became interested in the problem and mystery of suicide while working at the Veterans Hospital in Brentwood. Becoming involved in trying to understand one case, he conducted much research into suicide notes and motivations. He formulated many terms to use in such study: as his researcher colleague Norman Farberow wrote of him: "He is one of the brightest, sharpest, most intellectually gifted persons I have ever known," and later spoke of Shneidman's ability to coin new terms, such as suicidology, psychological autopsy, psychache, and pseudocide notes (notes collected from non-suicidal subjects and compared with writings in a 1957 study).

In 1958 with Norman Farberow and Robert Litman, he founded the Los Angeles Suicide Prevention Center. The psychoanalyst Litman acted as executive director. At a time when suicide was little studied and discussion of it was avoided, they were pioneers. Shneidman helped them get funding for the project from the National Institutes of Health (NIH). In 1966 Shneidman began working as chief of a national project at the NIH to establish suicide prevention centers, and increased their number from a few to 100 in 40 states in three years.

In 1968 Shneidman founded the American Association of Suicidology and its bi-monthly journal called Suicide and Life-Threatening Behavior.

Changes in ideas of medical care led to the end of the national project and decreases in funds for suicide prevention centers. The Los Angeles Center was combined with programs of the Didi Hirsch Community Mental Health Center. More recently, treatment of people with depression and bipolar disorder, disorders often associated with suicide, has depended chiefly on the biological model and psychiatric drugs.

In 1970 he became the first professor of thanatology at UCLA, where he taught until 1988. He continued to write and mentor other psychologists throughout his life.

== Marriage and family ==
Shneidman married Jeanne, and they had four sons: David William, Jonathan Aaron, Paul Samuel, Robert James He died at the age of 91 on May 15, 2009, in Los Angeles, California.

== Legacy and honors ==
- 1973, the Edwin S. Shneidman Award was founded by the American Association of Suicidology, to honor scholars under age 40 for their contributions to the research of suicidology.
- 1987, he received the American Psychological Association Award for Distinguished Contributions to Public Service.
- 2005, Marian College awarded him an honorary doctorate and established a program in thanatology named for him
- 2007, he received the Erasing the Stigma Leadership Award from the Didi Hirsch Community Services Center.

== Works ==
- Clues to Suicide (with Norman Farberow) (1957)
- Cry for Help (with Farberow) (1961)
- Essays in Self Destruction (1967)
- The Psychology of Suicide: A Clinician's Guide to Evaluation and Treatment (with Farberow and Robert E. Litman) (1970)
- Death and the College Student: A Collection of Brief Essays on Death and Suicide by Harvard Youth (1973)
- Deaths of Man (1973), nominated for a National Book Award
- Suicidology: Contemporary Developments (1976)
- Voices of Death (1980)
- Suicide Thoughts and Reflections, 1960–1980 (1981)
- Death: Current Perspectives (1984)
- The Definition of Suicide (1985)
- Suicide as Psychache: A Clinical Approach to Self-Destructive Behavior (1993)

In this text, Shneidman coins the term "psychache"—intense emotional and psychological pain that eventually becomes intolerable and which cannot be abated by means that were previously successful—as the primary motivation for suicide

- The Suicidal Mind (1998)

Shneidman investigates three suicide attempts—one was completed --Schneidman taught the word "successful" was too sanguine and therefore inappropriate to use in reference to suicide, another led to death from infection several months later, and another uncompleted—and the common features of suicidal persons. An appendix features a questionnaire completed by one of his patients, measuring her level of "psychache".

- Lives & Deaths: Selections from the Works of Edwin S. Shneidman (1999) Edited by Dr. Antoon A. Leenaars.
- Comprehending Suicide: Landmarks in 20th-Century Suicidology (2001)

Editor — A compilation of previously published articles on the topic of suicide, starting with Le suicide by Émile Durkheim—one of Shneidman's heroes.

- Autopsy of a Suicidal Mind (2004)

An investigation into the suicide of "Arthur"—a doctor and lawyer who killed himself at age 33—including interviews with his family and loved ones, and responses from psychiatrists, psychologists, and sociologists.

- with David A. Jobes, Managing Suicidal Risk: A Collaborative Approach (2006)
- A Commonsense Book of Death: Reflections at Ninety of a Lifelong Thanatologist (2008)

An autobiographical memoir.
