= American Association of Suicidology =

American nonprofit organization

Coordinates: 38.9091°N 77.0411°W

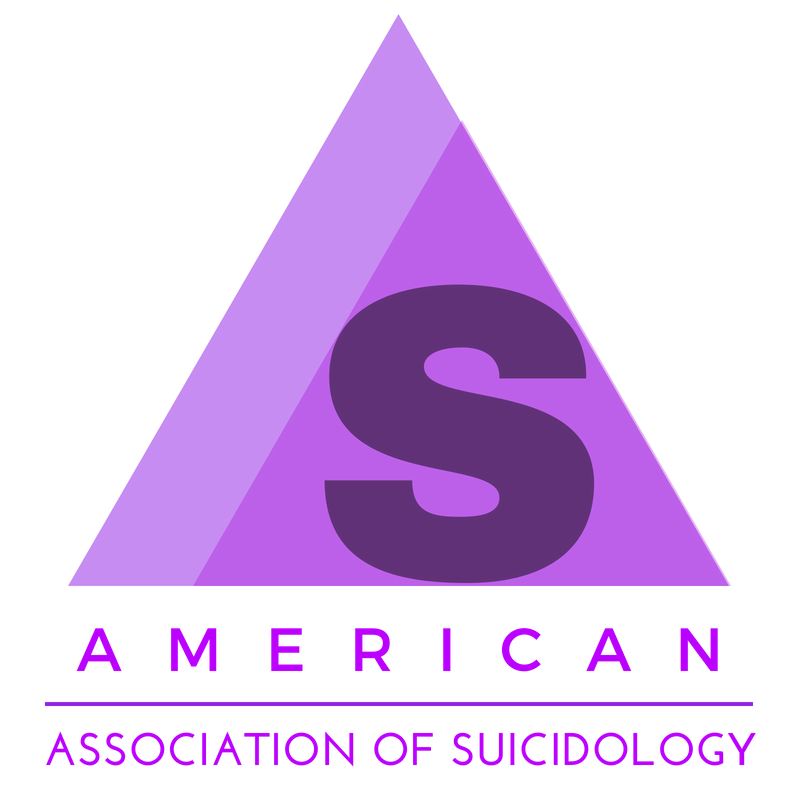
- Abbreviation: AAS
- Formation: 1968; 58 years ago
- Founder: Edwin S. Shneidman
- Founded at: California
- Type: 501(c)(3) nonprofit organization, advocacy group
- Purpose: Suicide prevention
- Headquarters: Washington, D.C.
- Members: 1,000 individuals and organizations (2023)
- Chief Executive Officer: Jenna Mehnert Baker
- Board Chair: Sarah Gadsby
- Publication: Suicide & Life Threatening Behavior
- Website: www.suicidology.org

The American Association of Suicidology (AAS) is a 501(c)(3) nonprofit organization which advocates for suicide prevention. It was established in 1968 by Edwin S. Shneidman, who has been called "a pioneer in suicide prevention." Its official journal is Suicide and Life-Threatening Behavior, published six times a year by Wiley-Blackwell.

== About ==
The American Association of Suicidology encourages further study in the field of suicidology by clinicians as well as the general public. The AAS states their mission is to encompass advanced study into suicidology as a field of science, educate the public in efforts to reduce the number of suicides worldwide, analyze and break down suicidal behaviors, and promote further research and training in the growing field of suicidology. The AAS hosts a campaign for both National Suicide Prevention Month and Week as well as public awareness campaigns to introduce new research and preventative measures for people who are currently dealing or have dealt with suicidal thoughts and behaviors. The AAS offers handbooks for suicide loss survivors and their friends and families to promote healing and a better understanding of suicidal triggers and causes.

== Science ==
Suicidology is the study of suicidal behaviors, risk factors of those behaviors, and suicide prevention. Suicidology combines both psychology and sociology to analyze the causes of suicidal behaviors and effective prevention methods.

=== Risk factors ===
Research has pointed towards hopelessness, impulsivity, social isolation, and exposure to violence as strong risk factors surrounding suicide.

=== Support groups ===
The Healing After Suicide Loss Summit (HASLS) takes place on the last day of the Annual Conference. Support groups take place at the HASLS that work to combat the risk factors of suicide through the emphasis on social interaction and interpersonal relationships. Educational programs and suicide specific skills and knowledge have proven effective in the treatment of suicidal patients.

== Membership ==
Membership of the AAS includes survivors of suicide loss, suicide attempt survivors, impacted friends and family, students, mental and public health professionals, suicide preventionists, interventionist and crisis intervention centers, and anyone else interested in suicide prevention.

== Programs ==
The AAS currently offers different types of suicide prevention programs.

=== Healing After Suicide Loss ===
The HASL program aims at helping suicide loss survivors connect with one another and share their experiences in a group setting while learning tools and resources.

=== Training and Accreditation ===
Training and Accreditation programs focus on utilizing techniques and skills to eliminate suicidal behaviors. Mental health professionals, school and youth personnel, and crisis workers primarily make up this program.

=== Conferences ===
The annual American Association of Suicidology conference is an event in April where private individuals, professionals, and organizations gather to collaborate, critically analyze, and network to advance the mission of building lives worth living and preventing suicide. The 2020 conference (#AAS20), in response to the COVID-19 pandemic, was the first virtual conference in the organization's history. AAS received MeetingNet's 2020 Changemaker Award for their conference focus on diversity, equity and inclusion and "keeping that momentum across the virtual medium".

=== National Center for the Prevention of Youth Suicide ===
The National Center for the Prevention of Youth Suicide includes a youth advisory board that provides insight on projects aimed at suicide prevention and reaching its adolescent demographic.

== Training ==
Research points to a severe lack of training in suicide prevention within many fields of psychology and social work. Numbers from a national survey reported fewer than 25% of social workers having been trained in suicide prevention. The AAS is determined to prevent inadequately trained social workers and mental health professionals from working with potentially suicidal patients who display suicidal risk factors. The AAS believes promoting research and effective training—not only for mental health professionals and social workers, but also for the general public—will help prevent inadequate treatment by those in the fields of psychology and social work.

== Plans for the future ==
The AAS plans to spread suicidology as a field of scientific study and strives to reduce the number of suicide cases through research and analysis. In efforts to improve the field of suicidology, the International Academy for Suicide Research launched a task force to combat suicidal behaviors, causes, and risk factors to come up with better solutions and prevention programs.

== Controversy ==
On August 18, 2021, the organization posted a detailed statement regarding the resignation of its former CEO. On August 26, 2021, eight former board members of the AAS wrote an open letter calling for a walk out of members if their demands were not met. On August 31, 2021, the organization announced new board members and a new executive team. On December 13, 2022, AAS announced they had restructured and hired new permanent staff.

== See also ==
- National Alliance on Mental Illness
- Canadian Association for Suicide Prevention
- International Association for Suicide Prevention
