= International Association for Suicide Prevention =

- Abbreviation: IASP
- Formation: 1960
- Type: INGO
- Region served: Worldwide
- Official language: English
- Website: IASP Official website

The International Association for Suicide Prevention (IASP) is an international suicide prevention organization. Founded by Erwin Ringel and Norman Farberow in 1960, IASP, which is in an official relationship with the World Health Organization, is dedicated to preventing suicidal behavior and providing a forum for mental health professionals, crisis workers, suicide survivors and other people in one way or another affected by suicidal behaviour. The organization now consists of professionals and volunteers from over 50 countries worldwide.

The IASP also co-sponsors World Suicide Prevention Day on September 10 every year, with the World Health Organization.

== IASP Congresses ==
The IASP holds international congresses every two years. XXIX World Congress of the IASP will be organized in Kuching (Malaysia) in 2017.

Past congresses

2015 Montreal, Canada
2013 Oslo, Norway
2011 Beijing, China
2009 Montevideo, Uruguay
2007 Killarney, Ireland
2005 Durban, South Africa
2003 Stockholm, Sweden
2001 Chennai, India
1999 Athens, Greece
1997 Adelaide, Australia
1995 Venice, Italy
1993 Montreal Canada
1991 Hamburg, Germany
1989 Brussels, Belgium
1987 San Francisco, US
1985 Vienna, Austria
1983 Caracas, Venezuela
1981 Paris, France
1979 Ottawa, Canada
1977 Helsinki, Finland
1975 Jerusalem, Israel
1973 Amsterdam, Netherlands
1971 Mexico City, Mexico
1969 London, England
1967 Los Angeles, US
1965 Basel, Switzerland
1963 Copenhagen, Denmark
1960 Vienna, Austria

== Awards ==
The International Association for Suicide Prevention (IASP) provides awards for those who have contributed in a significant way to the furthering of the aims of the Association. Awards are presented at the IASP biennial conference.

The Stengel Research Award has been provided since 1977 and is named in honour of Professor Erwin Stengel, one of the founders of the International Association for Suicide Prevention (IASP). This award is for outstanding research in the field of suicidology, and nominations can be made by any member of IASP.

The Ringel Service Award was instituted in 1995 and honours Professor Erwin Ringel, the founding President of the Association. This award is for distinguished service in the field of suicidology, and nominations can be made by National Representatives of IASP.

The Farberow Award was introduced in 1997 in recognition of Professor Norman Farberow, a founding member and driving force behind the IASP. This award is for a person who has contributed significantly in the field of work with survivors of suicide, and nominations can be made by any IASP member.

The De Leo Fund Award honours the memory of Nicola and Vittorio, the children of Professor Diego De Leo, IASP Past President. The Award is offered to distinguished scholars in recognition of their outstanding research on suicidal behaviours carried out in developing countries.

== Journal ==
The Association’s journal, Crisis - The Journal of Crisis Intervention and Suicide Prevention, has been published since 1980.
