= Suicidology =

Scientific study of suicide and self-destructive behaviors

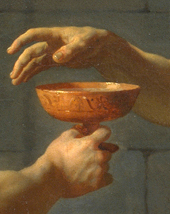
Socrates is about to take the poison cup (detail from The Death of Socrates)

Suicidology is the scientific study of suicidal behaviour, the causes of suicidality and suicide prevention. Every year, more than 720,000 people die by suicide in the world, resulting in a mortality rate of around 9/100,000. Researchers of the field are called suicidologists. Suicide is believed to be largely preventable, with the right actions, knowledge about suicide, and the destigmatization of suicide and related mental illnesses. Suicidology draws from many fields of social science, including psychology, sociology, psychiatry, applied philosophy and public health.

== Definitions ==
Suicide is defined as the act of intentionally causing one's own death. This can be distinguished from a number of related phenomena, including suicidal ideation, self harm, parasuicide and self-destructive behavior, which may also be studied in suicidology.

Suicidal ideation is when someone is having thoughts or showing gestures of suicide. This may be passive or active, depending on whether they express a desire to take action to end their life.

Self-destructive behaviors are anything that cause harm to oneself. This can be intentional or unintentional. Some examples are alcoholism, risky sports, some sexual disorders, and eating disorders.

Self harm is causing deliberate harm to oneself.

Parasuicide is considered to a form of self harm involving suicidal behavior, but without the intention to die. In practice, the term may be used ambiguously, and intentional self-destructive behavior that results in unplanned death may be conflated with suicide.

By way of a suicide note the person who is going to commit suicide has the last word. It is also a way for the person to explain, bring closure (or not), guilt the reader, dictate wishes, plead for forgiveness, or to control, forgive or blame others. It may also express self-criticism or ambivalence, or a sense of being a savior or being saved.

== History ==
While suicidology as a field is relatively young, cultural, legal, and religious perspectives influencing suicidal behavior have always existed. Ancient Greece held divided views on suicide: tolerated and even lauded when committed by patricians (generals and philosophers) but condemned if committed by plebeians (common people) or slaves. Roman society viewed suicide neutrally or positively, valuing life less highly. During early Christianity, excessive martyrdom and a penchant toward suicide frightened church elders sufficiently for them to introduce a serious deterrent. Suicide was thought of as a crime because it precluded possibility of repentance, and it violated the sixth commandment which is Thou shall not kill. During this time, St. Thomas Aquinas emphasized that suicide was a mortal sin because it disrupted God's power over man's life and death. This belief took hold and for hundreds of years thereafter played an important part in the Western view of suicide.

In the west, academic study of suicide is thought to have begun during the Enlightenment, as a subject of early sociology. André-Michel Guerry and Adolphe Quetelet considered suicide in their statistical analysis of crime and other social phenomena, and Harriet Martineau, citing their work, used such statistics to demonstrate a relationship between suicide rates and social well-being. Emile Durkheim's Le Suicide, considered a seminal work of sociology, analyzed demographic differences in suicide rates, finding a higher rate in Protestants than Catholics and a higher rate for men than for women.

Over the last 200 years, the main focus of interventions to prevent suicide has moved from appeals to religious beliefs, which may hold less weight in the modern day, to efforts at understanding and preventing the psychological and social influences that lead to suicide.

== Theories of suicide ==
One of the first to contribute to the study of suicidology is Edwin S. Shneidman. Shneidman is considered to be the father of suicidology. Shneidman's definition of suicide is a conscious act of self-induced annihilation, best understood as a multidimensional malaise in a needful individual who defines an issue for which suicide is perceived as the best solution. He thought of suicide as psychache or intolerable psychological pain.

Another notable person in the field of suicidology is Emile Durkheim. To Durkheim the word suicide is applied to all cases of death resulting directly or indirectly from a positive or negative act of the victim himself, which he knows will produce this result. Basically, he saw suicide as an external and constraining social fact independent of individual psychopathology.

Sigmund Freud and Karl Menninger had similar views on suicide. Their definition of suicide had three different aspects. One was a murder involving hatred or the wish to kill. The second one was a murder by the self often involving guilt or the wish to be killed. The last one is the wish to die. They thought of suicide being a murderous death wish that was turned back upon one's own self. Freud also believed that we had two opposing basic instincts—life (Eros) and death (Thanatos)—and all instincts sought tension reduction. He also believed that suicide is more likely in advanced civilizations requiring greater repression of sexual and aggressive energy.

Jean Baechler's definition of suicide was that suicide denotes all behavior that seeks and finds the solution to an existential problem by making an attempt on the life of the subject.

Another worker in the field of suicidology was Joseph H. Davis. The definition he gave for suicide is a fatal willful self-inflicted life-threatening act without apparent desire to live; implicit are two basic components lethality and intent.

Albert Camus also did some work in this field. He believed that whether one can live or chooses to live is the only truly serious philosophical problem. He also claimed that man created a god in order to be able to live without a wish to kill himself and that the only human liberty is to come to terms with death. He introduced Darwinian thought into his teachings.

== Areas of study ==
In keeping with the biopsychosocial model of human health, suicidology generally involves analysis of the effect of specific biological, psychological and social factors on suicidal behavior. This research is often carried out by subject area experts such as doctors, mental health providers, sociologists, or philosophers, but is brought together in a public health or public policy context to determine suicide prevention strategies.

=== Biology of suicidality ===
Investigation of the biological origins or correlates of suicidal behavior often falls under the umbrella of psychiatry, and techniques such as medical genetics or neurological imaging may be used to investigate suicidal behavior both in and of itself and in the context of other psychiatric illnesses.

=== Psychology of suicidality ===
Psychological factors in suicide have been the subject of both psychology and philosophy research, with major contributions from experienced mental health providers.

=== Social factors affecting suicidality ===
The investigation of social factors related to suicidology can be a matter of sociology or other areas of social science, and may also draw frameworks from ethics, phenomenology, and other areas of philosophy.

=== Suicide prevention ===
Suicide prevention is generally divided into primary, secondary, and tertiary prevention. Primary prevention encompasses programs and policies that promote social well-being, such as programs for underserved communities or restrictions on access to lethal means. Secondary prevention mainly involves screening to identify those at risk of suicide. Tertiary prevention pertains to people who have already been identified as suicidal, and aims to reduce their individual risk of suicide. More broadly, it can also encompass prevention programs aimed at those who are already at risk, such as crisis lines or psychiatric hospitalization.

== Influential findings ==
Findings in suicidology have informed intervention strategies aimed at reducing suicide mortality. The finding that discussing suicidal ideation with at-risk individuals does not increase the subsequent likelihood of suicide has been influential to standards of psychological intervention by dispelling concerns of inherent risks associated with assessing for suicidality.

The observation that most deaths by suicide are preceded by warning signs has been cited to emphasize the importance of addressing signs of suicidal ideation directly in individuals expressing them.

By contrast, general and social media coverage of suicide, particularly when dramatized or when the method is described, may increase the risk of suicide particularly in younger populations.

That said, recent research suggests that a substantial proportion of suicide attempts occur within minutes of the decision and a majority occur within three hours, challenging previously held beliefs that most attempts involve long deliberation. As such, means restriction, rapid intervention, and continuous monitoring are of particular importance to reduce risk during periods of acute risk. Means restriction, in particular, is shown to be one of the most effective population-level suicide-prevention strategies. Restricting access to lethal means, such as by installing physical barriers on bridges and high structures and pesticide bans, reliably reduces suicide attempts and deaths, often with large, site-specific effects and with no evidence of individuals substituting other methods.

== See also ==
- American Association of Suicidology
- Depression (mood)
- Epidemiology of depression
- Epidemiology of suicide
- Euthanasia
- Gender differences in suicide
- List of countries by suicide rate
- List of suicides
  - List of suicides (A–M)
  - List of suicides (N–Z)
- Major depressive disorder
- Mental health first aid
- Mood disorder
- Philosophy of suicide
- Prevalence of mental disorders
- Psychiatry
- Psychology
- Suicide attempt
- Suicide crisis
- Suicide prevention
