= National Action Alliance for Suicide Prevention =

U.S. organization

- Founded: 2010; 16 years ago
- Type: Public-interest suicide prevention organization, public health campaign
- Purpose: Suicide prevention
- Location: Washington, D.C., U.S.
- Region served: United States
- Product: legal representation, public education
- Key people: Co-Chairs: Public Sector Co-Chair: John M. McHugh, Secretary of the United States Army; Private Sector Co-Chair: Gordon H. Smith, President and CEO, National Association of Broadcasters
- Website: theactionalliance.org

The National Action Alliance for Suicide Prevention (Action Alliance) is an American suicide prevention organization coordinating national efforts to advance the National Strategy for Suicide Prevention (NSSP). It is a public/private partnership that, according to them, "catalyzes planning, implementation, and accountability for updating and advancing the NSSP. The Action Alliance works on the 2001 National Strategy for Suicide Prevention and is an outgrowth of the Suicide Prevention Resource Center. The Action Alliance initially focused on three high-risk populations: LGBT youth, American Indians/Alaska Natives, and military/veterans. Part of the group's campaign will be to educate on the warning signs of suicide, promoting the National Suicide Prevention Lifeline (1-800-273-TALK or 988 in the US), as well as community crisis clinics across the U.S.

Part of the Action Alliance's work is to identify culturally appropriate interventions to serve various minority populations. Clinical social worker Caitlin Ryan, whose work has been recognized by numerous organizations including the Action Alliance explains that these are "interventions that address multiple aspects of people's lives, such as ethnicity, culture, language, socioeconomic status and religious diversity in providing services ... [to meet people] where they are, to explain our findings and family approach in ways that cross language and cultural barriers."

In December 2011 Action Alliance partnered with Substance Abuse and Mental Health Services Administration (SAMHSA), a branch of the U.S. Department of Health and Human Services and Facebook to offer a new service to help offer suicide crisis worker access to users who were flagged by others for posting suicidal comment. "The person who posted the suicidal comment will then immediately receive an email from Facebook encouraging them to call the National Suicide Prevention Lifeline at 1-800-273-TALK (8255) or to click on a link to begin a confidential chat session with a crisis worker."

== Mission ==
The mission of the Action Alliance is to advance the 2001 National Strategy for Suicide Prevention by "identifying suicide prevention as a national priority, catalyzing efforts to implement high-priority objectives of the NSSP, and cultivating the sources needed to sustain progress."

== Task forces ==
The Action Alliance has 14 task forces.

Infrastructure task forces include the Data and Surveillance Task Force, the National Strategy for Suicide Prevention Task Force, and the Research Prioritization Task Force.

High-Risk Populations task forces include the American Indian/Alaska Native Task Force, the LGBT Populations Task Force, the Military/Veterans Task Force, the Suicide Attempt Survivors Task Force, and the Survivors of Suicide Loss Task Force.

Interventions task forces include the Clinical Care and Intervention Task Force, the Clinical Workforce Preparedness Task Force, the Faith Communities Task Force, the Public Awareness and Education Task Force, the Workplace Task Force, and the Youth in Contact with the Juvenile Justice System Task Force.

=== LGBT populations ===
Although first focused on suicide among LGBT youth, the LGBT (lesbian, gay, bisexual, transgender) task force expanded to include LGBT of all ages "acknowledging the struggles with suicide idealization, suicide attempts, and death by suicide that many LGBT people confront at different points in their lives." The initial leaders of the task force were Charles Robbins, head of The Trevor Project, which operates a nationwide LGBT youth suicide prevention program, and Kevin Jennings, the then Department of Education's Assistant Deputy Secretary for the Office of Safe and Drug-Free Schools. Jennings, an openly gay appointee, founded the Gay, Lesbian and Straight Education Network (GLSEN).

=== American Indian and Alaska Native ===
The American Indian and Alaska Native task force has coordinated two national action summits (August 2011, in Scottsdale, Arizona, and October 2011 in Anchorage, Alaska). The task force is led by Yvette Roubideaux, Director of Indian Health Service, United States Department of Health & Human Services.

"The Summits focused on the importance of collaboration among tribal, federal, state, and community- and program-level leadership to promote American Indian and Alaska Native behavioral health."

=== Military and veterans ===
The Military and Veterans (see United States Department of Veterans Affairs) task force is co-chaired by Jan Kemp, VISN2 Center of Excellence for Suicide Prevention. The task force will "join Department of Defense (DoD) and Department of Veterans Affairs (VA) suicide prevention programs already in progress. In doing so, suicide prevention programs aimed at military personnel will combine approaches from both public and private sectors into a single effort."

== Executive committee ==
The initial executive committee was nominated by the general public and reviewed by a nominating committee of suicide prevention leaders from both the public and private sectors. Candidates were selected based on criteria including; do they bring a needed perspective to suicide prevention, can they leverage change at the national level; and can they uniquely contribute to the Executive Committee? Since the September 2010 launch new candidates are reviewed by the nominating committee and finalized by the co‐chairs.

As of 2012, the leadership committee as listed from the organization's website:

Co-Chairs:

- Public Sector Co-chair: John M. McHugh, Secretary of the US Army
- Private Sector Co-chair: Gordon H. Smith, President and CEO, National Association of Broadcasters

Full members:

- Talitha J. Arnold, Senior Pastor United Church of Santa Fe
- Carl Bell, M.D., President and CEO Community Mental Health Council
- Tom Berger, executive director of the Veterans Health Council, Vietnam Veterans of America
- Andrew Bertagnolli, Ph.D., National Director Virtual Behavioral Health, One Medical & Associate Professor, Alliant International University
- Brian Boon, President and CEO Commission on Accreditation of Rehabilitation Facilities
- Robert Certain, Director The Episcopal Church of Saint Peter and Saint Paul
- David Covington, vice-president, Adult & Youth Services, Magellan Health Services
- Judy Cushing, President and CEO Oregon Partnership
- Mary Durham, Vice-president Kaiser Permanente
- Brian Dyak, President and CEO Entertainment Industries Council, Inc.
- Saul Feldman, Chairman Emeritus United Behavioral Health
- David Grossman, medical director, Preventive Care Group Health Research Institute
- McClellan Hall, Executive Director National Indian Youth Leadership Project
- Jack Heath, Founder and CEO Inspire USA Foundation
- Andrew Lane, Executive Director Johnson Family Foundation
- Beverly Malone, CEO National League for Nursing
- Walter A. McNeil, President International Association of Chiefs of Police
- Jamie Moyer Co-founder Moyer Foundation
- Karen Moyer Co-founder Moyer Foundation
- Jerry Reed, Director Suicide Prevention Resource Center
- Phil Satow, Representative National Council for Suicide Prevention
- Paul M. Schyve, Senior Vice President, Healthcare Improvement The Joint Commission
- Joe Sullivan, Chief Security Officer Facebook, Inc.
- Robert W. Turner, Senior Vice President – Corporate Relations Union Pacific Railroad
- Eduardo Vega, Executive Director Mental Health Association of San Francisco
- Mary Hayashi, chair, Assembly Business, California Professions & Consumer Protection Committee, California State Assembly
- Michael Hogan, Commissioner New York State Office of Mental Health
- Pamela Hyde, Administrator Substance Abuse and Mental Health Services Administration
- Robert Jesse, Principal Deputy Under Secretary for Health United States Department of Veterans Affairs
- Mary Lou Leary, Acting Assistant United States Attorney General, Office of Justice Programs,

Ex Officio Members:

- Regina Benjamin, Surgeon General of the United States, Office of the Surgeon General
- Thomas Frieden, Director Centers for Disease Control and Prevention
- Kathy Greenlee, Assistant Secretary for Aging Administration on Aging
- Thomas Insel, Director National Institute of Mental Health
- Howard K. Koh, Assistant Secretary for Health United States Department of Health and Human Services
- Yvette Roubideaux, Director Indian Health Service
- Mary Wakefield, Administrator Health Resources and Services Administration

== See also ==
- List of suicide crisis lines
