= Think Before You Speak (campaign) =

LGBT support campaign

- One of the original public service announcement ads encouraging people to think before saying "That's so gay!"
- Founded: October 2008
- Type: Educational charity
- Purpose: Youth and young adult awareness about homophobia and bullying
- Location: New York, New York
- Origins: Gay, Lesbian and Straight Education Network (GLSEN)
- Region served: United States
- Product: Public service announcements and campaigns
- Method: Online, radio and print campaigns, Field organizing, Entertainment community
- Website: www.thinkb4youspeak.com

The Think Before You Speak campaign is a television, radio, and magazine advertising campaign launched in 2008 and developed to raise awareness of the common use of derogatory vocabulary among youth towards lesbian, gay, bisexual, transgender, queer/questioning (LGBTQ) people. It also aims to "raise awareness about the prevalence and consequences of anti-LGBTQ bias and behaviour in America's schools." As LGBTQ people have become more accepted in the mainstream culture, more studies have confirmed that they are one of the most targeted groups for harassment and bullying. An "analysis of 14 years of hate crime data" by the FBI found that gays and lesbians, or those perceived to be gay, "are far more likely to be victims of a violent hate crime than any other minority group in the United States". "As Americans become more accepting of LGBT people, the most extreme elements of the anti-gay movement are digging in their heels and continuing to defame gays and lesbians with falsehoods that grow more incendiary by the day," said Mark Potok, editor of the Intelligence Report. "The leaders of this movement may deny it, but it seems clear that their demonization of gays and lesbians plays a role in fomenting the violence, hatred and bullying we're seeing." Because of their sexual orientation or gender identity/expression, nearly half of LGBTQ students have been physically assaulted at school. The campaign takes positive steps to counteract hateful and anti-gay speech that LGBTQ students experience in their daily lives in hopes to de-escalate the cycle of hate speech/harassment/bullying/physical threats and violence.

The campaign was created by the New York office of Arnold Worldwide, part of the Arnold Worldwide Partners unit of Havas, and the Gay, Lesbian and Straight Education Network (GLSEN). The campaign is the Ad Council's first LGBT awareness campaign and is trying to achieve an ending to the use of what they consider offensive phrases such as "that's so gay". Television commercials for the campaign include singer Hilary Duff as well as comedian Wanda Sykes. In 2008 the campaign won the Ad Council's Gold Bell award for "Best Public Service Advertising Campaign".

== Background ==
A U.S. government study, titled Report of the Secretary's Task Force on Youth Suicide, published in 1989, found that LGBT youth are four times more likely to attempt suicide than other young people. This higher prevalence of suicidal ideation and overall mental health problems among gay teenagers compared to their heterosexual peers has been attributed to minority stress. Depression and drug use among LGBT people have both been shown to increase significantly after new laws that discriminate against gay people are passed. Institutionalized and internalized homophobia may also lead LGBTQ youth to not accept themselves and have deep internal conflicts about their sexual orientation.

"Approximately 25 percent of lesbian, gay and bisexual students and university employees have been harassed due to their sexual orientation, as well as a third of those who identify as transgender, according to the study and reported by the Chronicle of Higher Education." "LGBT students are three times as likely as non-LGBT students to say that they do not feel safe at school (22% vs. 7%) and 90% of LGBT students (vs. 62% of non-LGBT teens) have been harassed or assaulted during the past year." In addition, "LGBQ students were more likely than heterosexual students to have seriously considered leaving their institution as a result of harassment and discrimination." Susan Rankin, a contributing author to the report in Miami, found that "Unequivocally, The 2010 State of Higher Education for LGBT People demonstrates that LGBTQ students, faculty and staff experience a 'chilly' campus climate of harassment and far less than welcoming campus communities."

Homophobia arrived at by any means can be a gateway to bullying. As seen in the nine LGBTQ youth suicides in September 2010, severe bullying can lead to extremities such as suicide. It does not always have to be physical, but it can be emotional, viral, sexual, and racial, too. Physical bullying is kicking, punching, while emotional bullying is name calling, spreading rumors and other verbal abuse. Viral, or cyber bullying, involves abusive text messages or messages of the same nature on Facebook, Twitter, and other social media networks. Sexual bullying is unwanted touching, lewd gestures or jokes, and racial bullying has to do with stereotypes and discrimination.

Bullying is often dismissed as a "rite of passage", but studies have shown it has negative physical and psychological effects. "Sexual minority youth, or teens that identify themselves as gay, lesbian or bisexual, are bullied two to three times more than heterosexuals", and "almost all transgender students have been verbally harassed (e.g., called names or threatened in the past year at school because of their sexual orientation (89%) and gender expression (89%)", according to GLSEN's Harsh Realities, The Experiences of Transgender Youth In Our Nation's Schools. These issues have become more mainstream in the 2000s (decade), and even more so in the months of September and October 2010 when a series of suicides got national attention. In August 2010 the US Department of Education (DOE) hosted the first-ever National Bullying Summit. President Barack Obama has posted an "It Gets Better" video on The White House website as part of the It Gets Better Project, it became the second most-viewed video on the White House YouTube channel.

"More than 34,000 people die by suicide each year," making it "the third leading cause of death among 15 to 24 year olds with lesbian, gay, and bisexual youth attempting suicide up to four times more than their heterosexual peers." In 2004, 1,985 American adolescents under the age of twenty committed suicide, an increase of 18% from the previous year. Though it is impossible to know the exact suicide rate of LGBT youth because sexuality and gender minorities are often hidden and even unknown, particularly in this age group. Further research is currently being done to explain the prevalence of suicide among LGBT youths.

== Campaign ==
Kevin Jennings, who is openly gay and is the Assistant Deputy Secretary for the Office of Safe and Drug-Free Schools at the U.S. Department of Education, has experienced bullying himself at school and has hoped for this campaign for over ten years. The campaign aims to reduce homophobic slang among youth, and educate parents and teachers on how to create a safe space for LGBT teens. GLSEN and the Ad Council have reported that over half of all students have heard homophobic remarks being made often at school, and 9 out of 10 LGBT students have been harassed at school over the last year. The campaign encourages students to get involved by starting a Gay-Straight Alliance, educating their peers, and working to create a safer environment for LGBT students. This is the first campaign on LGBT issues since the Ad Council was founded in 1942. The campaign uses the slogan "When you say 'That's so gay,' do you realize what you say? Knock it off." Previously the council has run other anti-discrimination campaigns like "A mind is a terrible thing to waste," for the United Negro College Fund, and "Expect the best from a girl and that's what you'll get" to promote gender equality.

GLSEN spent approximately $2 million to produce the campaign, which was released along with GLSEN's 2007 School Climate Survey. It includes three television public service announcements (PSAs), six print PSAs and three radio PSAs. The ad was the first ever campaign by the Ad Council, "which directs and coordinates public service campaigns on behalf of Madison Avenue and the media industry", to address any GLBTQ issues. The campaign was done pro bono by the New York office of Arnold Worldwide.

In researching the possibility that public service directors, who decide which pro bono campaigns their media outlet will run, they found only a "very small percentage" who would not run the campaign but mainly due to their audience was much older. They also tested how to deliver the messages to "tough and media savvy" kids "that speaks to young people in a tone they do not deem patronizing or condescending." Their goal became "to show the situation in a new light ... to point out this language can be hurtful and let the kids make their own decisions."

After the first year of the campaign had been reached, the second harder-hitting phase addressing the consequences, "sometimes life-or-death", of anti-gay language was launched. The first phase focused on showing the television PSAs to get young people to see how their language can be hurtful, the ads combined for "more than $9 million worth of media exposure for the campaign's message since its launch in October 2008." The second phase will be more viral and enable people to embed banners and materials on websites and in their social media use. All the materials are downloadable from the campaign site. The Ad Council reports a high recognition of the television spots among teens (41% of teens aged 13–16 nationwide reporting that they have seen or heard at least one PSA) and a recent survey conducted by the Council shows "significant shifts in key attitudes and behaviors regarding the use of anti-LGBTQ slurs." Another downloadable feature is a meter that tracks the occurrence of common LGBTQ slurs such as fag and dyke "in real time—on the popular micro-blogging site Twitter."

== See also ==
- Day of Silence
- Social stigma
