= Rainbow Friday =

Social campaign

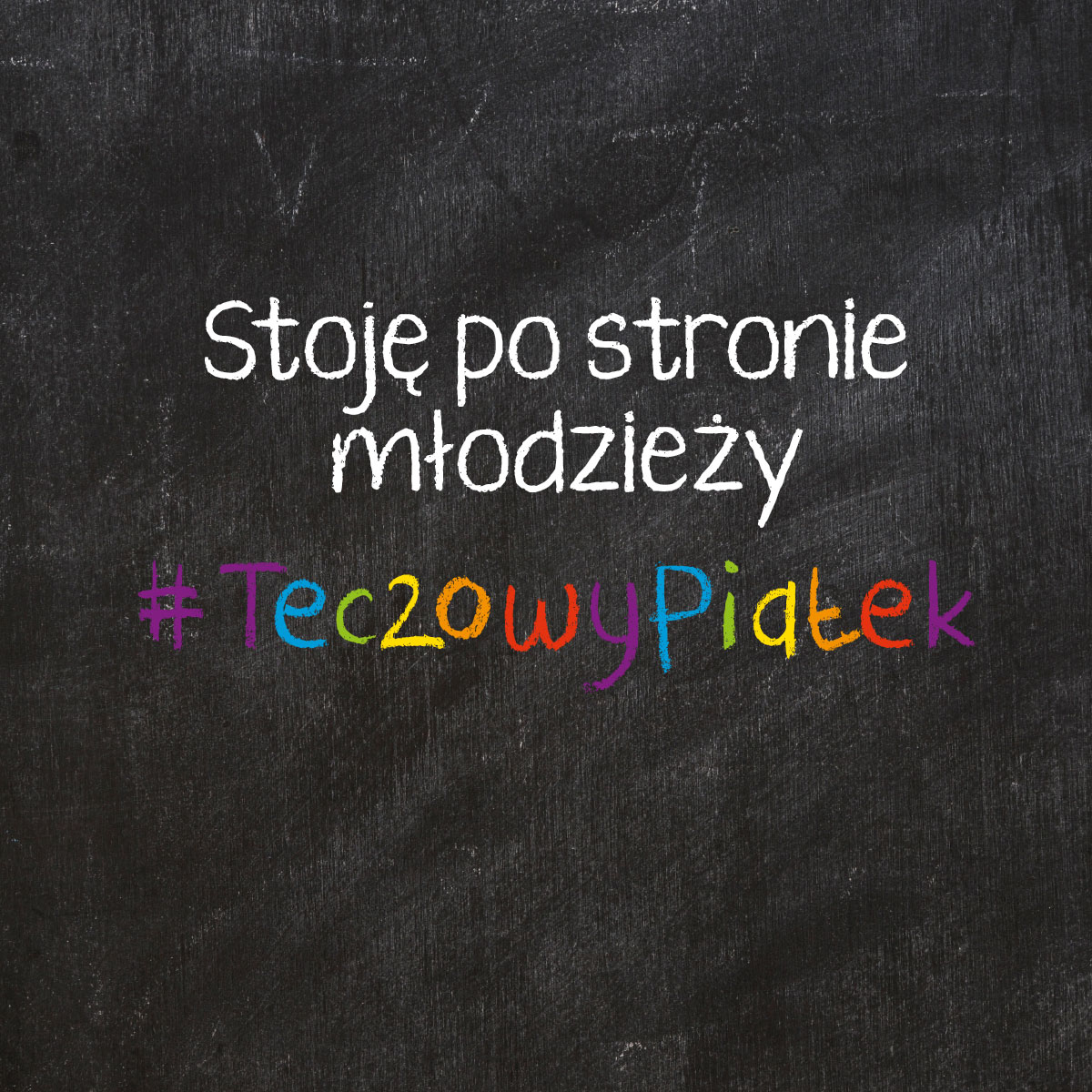
A poster reads "I stand with the youth #RainbowFriday" (Stoją po stonie młodzieży #TęczowyPiątek)

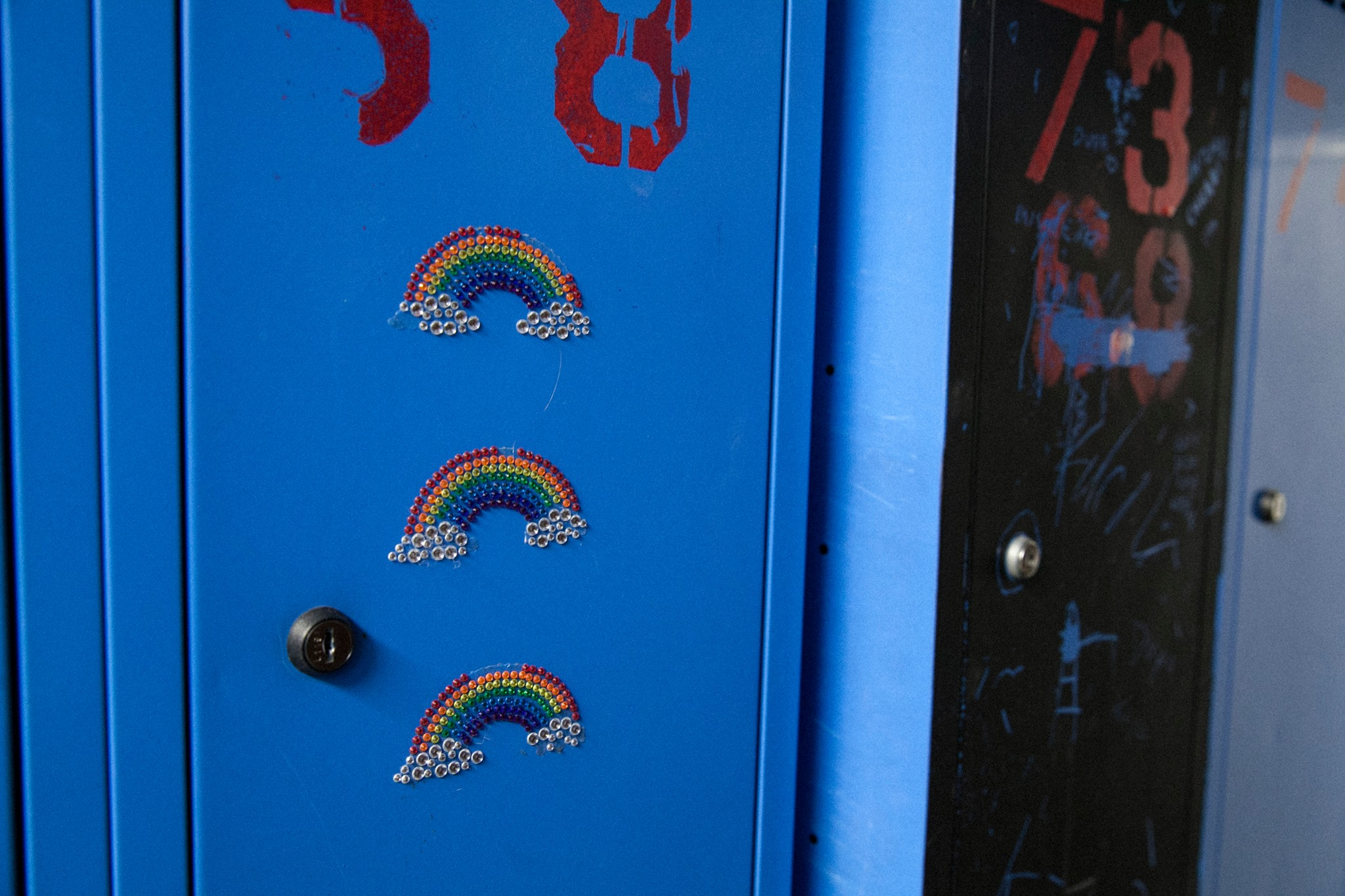
School locker with rainbow stickers for Rainbow Friday

Rainbow Friday (Polish: Tęczowy Piątek) is a social and educational action established by Campaign Against Homophobia to show solidarity with LGBT youth, supporting them in the school environment. The action's aim is to show that the school is a safe and friendly place for every young person, no matter their sexual orientation or gender identity. The campaign first occurred on 28 October 2016, and since then has happened annually on the last Friday of October. Since 2023, the action has been organized by Foundation GrowSPACE.

== Description ==
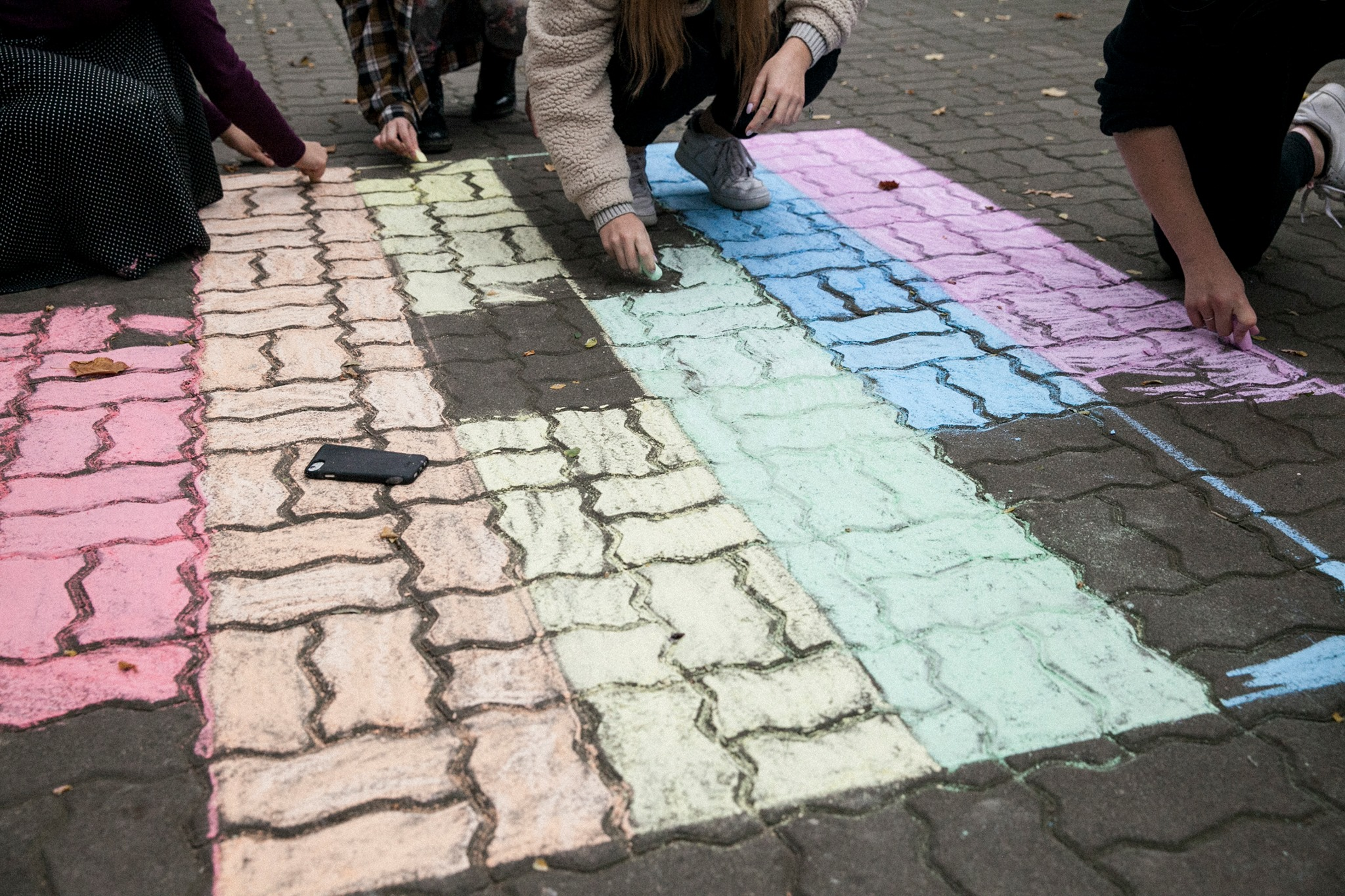
LGBT flag drawn by students during Rainbow Friday

Fearing lack of acceptance and violence, many LGBT students hide their sexuality or gender identity in school. The action "Rainbow Friday" was made with the aim of showing solidarity with LGBTQI people. During Rainbow Friday, one can show their support for LGBTQI people in several ways: by wearing rainbow colors, by wearing a rainbow pin, making a lesson about tolerance and problems of LGBTQI community, by hanging a poster with information about the event or by organizing workshops and talks with people, who face the problems of aggression and intolerance.

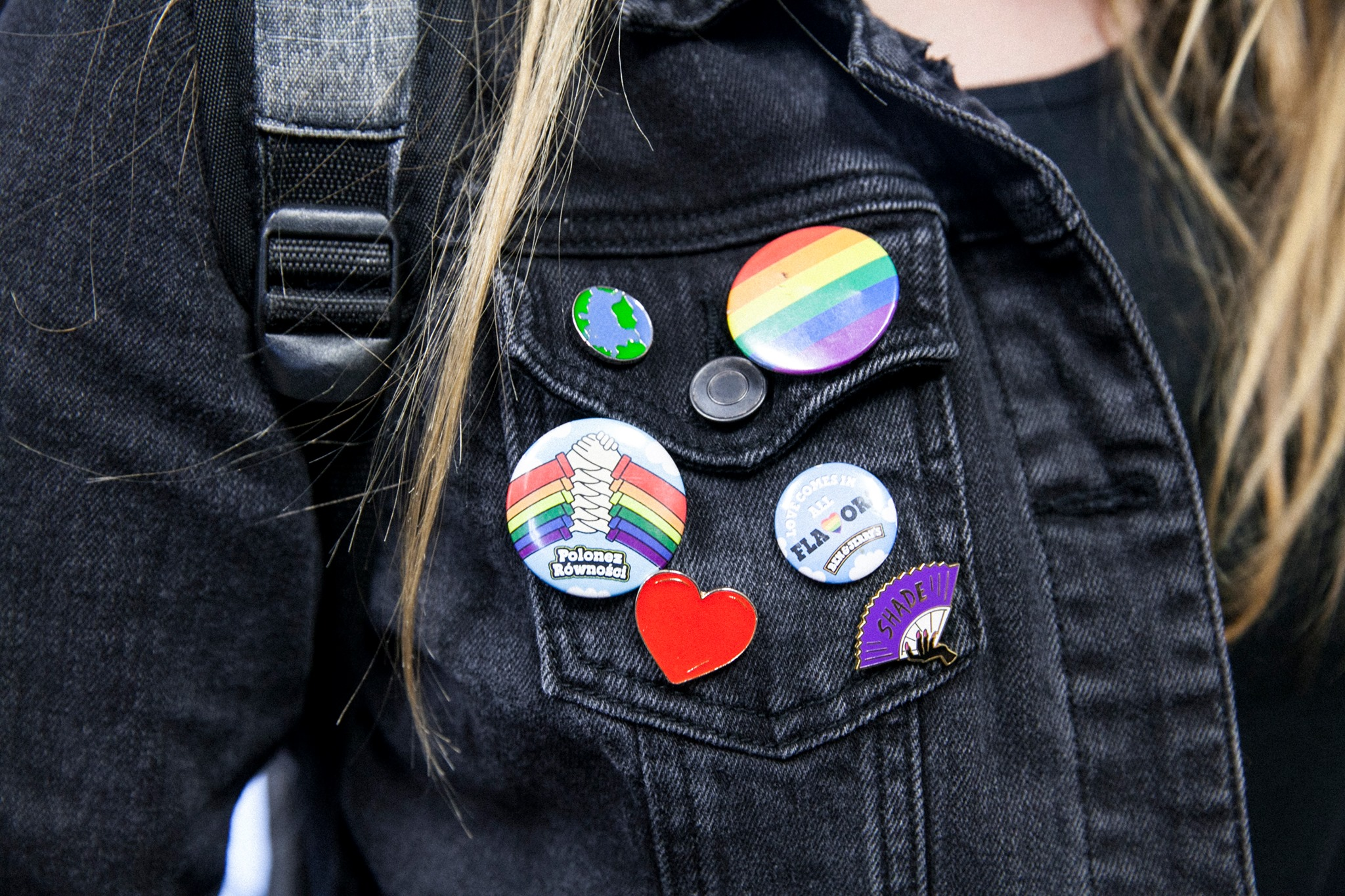
Pins worn for Rainbow Friday

== History ==
The first edition of Rainbow Friday happened on 28 October 2016, with 75 schools participating.

In 2018, more than 200 schools participated, including 22 from Warsaw. The Polish Ministry of National Education stated that Rainbow Friday was not a part of the official curriculum and because of that, the parents would have to agree to such educational events. The Ministry also announced that participating schools would be controlled, and school leaders would be subject to disciplinary proceedings if they broke the rules.

For 2019, there is no data on participation because schools did not have to officially announce their participation. The Ministry of National Education expressed its opposition to the initiative of KPH, claiming it is an action "in direct opposition of Polish culture and history". In 2019, in opposition to Rainbow Friday, the Ministry of National Education established an action called "School Remembers" (Szkoła Pamięta), in which students and teachers were meant to commemorate important historical persons and events.

== Reception ==
In 2019, Polish celebrities, including Majka Jeżowska, Julia Kamińska, Mateusz Janicki and Jacek Poniedziałek, voiced their support for Rainbow Friday in a video called "I stand with the youth" ("Stoją po stonie młodzieży"). On the day of action, another artists joined, such as Anja Rubik, Maja Ostaszewska, Julia Wieniawa and Magdalena Cielecka.

Also in 2019, the hashtag #TęczowyPiątek (#Rainbow Friday) was the most commonly used hashtag for five hours on Polish Twitter. It was mostly used by the young people sharing what was happening in schools. The hashtag was also used by politicians. On Facebook, the overlay prepared by KPH was popular. The actions was also present on Instagram, where after searching #TęczowyPiątek there are hundreds of photos of young people taking part in the campaign.

== See also ==
- Ally Week
- Day of Silence
- Education and the LGBTQ community
- Equality Parade (Warsaw)
- International Day Against Homophobia, Biphobia and Transphobia
- LGBTQ rights in Poland
- LGBTQ youth vulnerability
