= Student Non-Discrimination Act =

The Student Non-Discrimination Act (H.R. 998, S. 555) is proposed United States federal legislation that aims to protect LGBT students against bullying and discrimination in school. It is modeled after Title IX of the Education Amendments of 1972, which addressed discrimination on the basis of sex.

The legislation was first introduced in the 111th Congress (2010-2011) and it died in committee.

On March 10, 2011, Rep. Jared Polis (D-CO) introduced the legislation in the House of Representatives and Sen. Al Franken (D-MN) introduced it in the Senate. Its prospects for passage were uncertain. Polis hoped the bill could become part of the annual re-authorization of the Elementary and Secondary Education Act (ESEA). It has 99 co-sponsors in the House and 27 co-sponsors in the Senate. Franken cited the 2010 suicide of Justin Aaberg, a 15-year-old Minnesota high school student, and appeared the same day at a press conference with Aalberg's mother, a critic of the record of the Minnesota Anoka-Hennepin Public School District on LGBT harassment. The introduction of the legislation was part of a week of events that focused on the problem of bullying, including a White House conference on bullying prevention and the introduction of two related bills, the Safe Schools Improvement Act (SSIA) by Sens. Bob Casey (D-PA) and Mark Kirk (R-IL) and the Tyler Clementi Higher Education Anti-Harassment Act by Sen. Frank Lautenberg (D-N.J.) and Rep. Rush Holt (D-N.J.).

The legislation provides a federal prohibition on discrimination against LGBT students in public schools. It forbids schools from discriminating based on sexual orientation and gender identity and prohibits them from ignoring harassing behavior. The bill defines discrimination as "harassment, bullying, intimidation, and violence based on sexual orientation or gender identity." Distinct from state legislation, the legislation can be enforced with the loss of federal funding.

Franken co-authored an article in support of the legislation with Joe Solmonese, president of the Human Rights Campaign in October 2010 and produced a video in its support a year later.

Neal McCluskey of the Cato Institute warned that "The definition of harassment could be so broadly interpreted that anybody who expressed a totally legitimate opinion about homosexual behavior could be made illegal. That's a violation of those kids who want to express opposition to LGBT opinions or behavior." Another opponent said it represented "the radical homosexual agenda" of Kevin Jennings, assistant deputy secretary for the Department of Education's Office of Safe and Drug-Free Schools. On March 8, 2012, the American Federation of Teachers, the Communications Workers of America, the American Counseling Association, the NAACP, the National Council of Jewish Women, and several dozen other groups supported the legislation in a letter to President Obama.

== See also ==
- It Gets Better
- The Trevor Project
