= Think Before You Speak =

Think Before You Speak may refer to:

- Think Before You Speak (album), a 2007 studio album by Good Shoes
- Think Before You Speak (campaign), a television, radio, and magazine advertising campaign launched in 2008
