= Suicide among LGBTQ people =

Research has found that attempted suicide rates and suicidal ideation among lesbian, gay, bisexual, transgender and queer (LGBTQ) people are significantly higher than among the general population.

This disparity in suicide attempts and ideation can be attributed to several factors. Minority stressors in the form of discrimination, violence, and internalized stigma contribute to the poor mental health of LGBTQ people. For LGBTQ youth, risk factors such as bullying, abuse, negative family treatment, as well as negative emotions caused by anti-LGBTQ legislation have also been identified.

Increased social, family, and peer support, LGBTQ-friendly policies, and access to inclusive healthcare services and gender-affirming care have been recommended to decrease the risk of suicide in LGBTQ people.

== Reports and studies ==
Numerous studies have shown that lesbian, gay, bisexual and transgender youth have a higher rate of suicide attempts than do heterosexual and cisgender youth. According to a Trevor Project 2023 survey, 18% of LGBTQ youth have attempted suicide, a rate 2 times higher than teenaged general population.

LGBTQ youth are not inherently suicidal; rather, the higher prevalence of suicidal ideation and overall mental health problems among LGBTQ teenagers compared to their heterosexual and cisgender peers has been attributed to minority stressors, such as discrimination, violence, bullying, as well parental disapproval.

Clinical social worker Caitlin Ryan's Family Acceptance Project at San Francisco State University, which partners with the National Child Traumatic Stress Network and American Foundation for Suicide Prevention, conducted the first study of the effect of family acceptance and rejection on the health, mental health, and well-being of LGBTQ youth, including suicide, HIV/AIDS, and homelessness. Their research showed that LGBTQ youths "who experience high levels of rejection from their families during adolescence (when compared with those young people who experienced little or no rejection from parents and caregivers) were more than eight times [more] likely to have attempted suicide, more than six times likely to report high levels of depression, more than three times likely to use illegal drugs, and more than three times likely to be at high risk for HIV or other STDs" by the time they reach their early 20s.

In terms of school climate, "approximately 25 percent of lesbian, gay and bisexual students and university employees have been harassed due to their sexual orientation, as well as a third of those who identify as transgender, according to the study and reported by the Chronicle of Higher Education." Research has found the presence of support groups, such gay–straight alliances (GSAs), in schools is associated with significantly improved mental health outcomes.

An international study found that suicidal LGBTQ people showed important differences with suicidal heterosexuals, in a matched-pairs study. That study found suicidal LGBTQ people were more likely to communicate suicidal intentions, to search for new friends online, and to find more support online than did suicidal heterosexuals.

=== Transgender suicides ===
Transgender individuals suffer from a far higher suicide rate than the general population. According to a systematic review published in 2023, suicidal thoughts are common among trans individuals, and about 50% of trans people with suicidal thoughts actually attempted suicide.

Studies identify a lack of access to gender-affirming care and negative societal attitudes (such as discrimination, violence, and rejection by family members) as reasons for this disparity. There is limited evidence that gender-affirming treatments, such as gender-affirming hormone therapy and surgery, lead to improved mental health outcomes and decreased suicidality in trans people. Individual studies have also shown that puberty blockers may have a positive effect on the mental health of trans youth, including reduced suicidality, though reviews of this literature have concluded that the evidence-quality of these studies is quite low.

A multi-year study published in September 2024 found that the passing of anti-trans laws that resulted in the restriction to transgender care, including restriction on access to puberty blockers, may have corresponded to negative mental health outcomes for transgender youth. The study followed the enactment of several laws in US states on restricting such access, which happened prior to a 7–72% increase of suicide attempts in transgender youth within one to two years.

=== Research on risk factors ===
==== Ethnicity ====
Ethnicity and higher levels of parental education have been shown not to significantly impact LGBTQ+ suicide statistics in at least one study, while other studies do show an impact.

A survey by the National LGBTQ Task Force found that among black transgender respondents, 49% reported having attempted suicide. Additional findings were that this group reported that 26% are unemployed and 34% reported an annual income of less than $10,000 per year. 41% of respondents reported homelessness at some point in their lives, which is more than five times the rate of the general US population. Also, the report revealed that the black transgender or gender non-conforming community reported 20.23% were living with HIV and that half of the respondents who attended school expressing a transgender identity or gender non-conformity reported facing harassment. 27% of black transgender youth reported being physically assaulted, 15% were sexually assaulted and 21% left school due to these instances of harassment.

A more recent survey by The Trevor Project revealed that 21% of African American LGBTQ youth have attempted suicide throughout 2021. Amongst Native American youth, 31% of LGBTQ youth have attempted suicide, and amongst Latin American youth, 18% of survey respondents admitted they have attempted suicide in the past year.

==== Familial acceptance ====
Familial responses to LGBTQ youth identities differ from person to person. They range from acceptance to outright rejection of the LGBTQ individual. "Family connectedness" is important in any young person's life because it helps establish positive mental health. One of the negative outcomes of LGBTQ youth confiding in family members about their sexual identities is the risk of being kicked out of their homes. When young people do not have support and acceptance from their family, they are more likely to turn to other, riskier sources.

Among transgender youth, these effects may be even more pronounced. In a separate survey of nearly 34,000 LGBTQ youth, those who described their families as "supportive" reported a suicide attempt rate that was less than half of those who did not. Another, far smaller, survey showed those that reported being strongly supported by their parents having a 93% lower suicide attempt rate.

==== Institutionalized and internalized homophobia ====
Institutionalized and internalized homophobia may also lead LGBTQ youth to not accept themselves and have deep internal conflicts about their sexual orientation. Parents may abandon or force children out of home after the child's coming out.

Homophobia arrived at by any means can be a gateway to bullying which can take many forms. Physical bullying is kicking, punching, while emotional bullying is name calling, spreading rumors and other verbal abuse. Cyber bullying involves abusive text messages or messages of the same nature on social media networks. Sexual bullying includes inappropriate touching, lewd gestures or jokes.

Bullying may be considered a "rite of passage", but studies have shown it has negative physical and psychological effects. "Sexual minority youth, or teens that identify themselves as gay, lesbian or bisexual, are bullied two to three times more than heterosexuals", and "almost all transgender students have been verbally harassed (e.g., called names or threatened in the past year at school because of their sexual orientation (89%) and gender expression (89%)") according to Gay, Lesbian and Straight Education Network's Harsh Realities: The Experiences of Transgender Youth In Our Nation's Schools.

Gender

On a national survey of 3713 LGBT adolescents, a study found that predictors of self-harm and suicide include identifying as female and non-binary or trans.

== Impact of same-sex marriage ==
Across OECD countries, the legalisation of same-sex marriage is associated with reductions in the suicide rate of youth aged 10–24, with this association persisting into the medium term. The establishment of the legal right of same-sex marriage in the United States is associated with a significant reduction in the rate of attempted suicide among children, with the effect concentrated among children of a minority sexual orientation.

A study of nationwide data from across the United States from January 1999 to December 2015 revealed that the recognition of same-sex marriage is associated with a significant reduction in the rate of attempted suicide among children, with the effect being concentrated among children of a minority sexual orientation (lesbian, gay and bi youth), resulting in approximately 134,000 fewer children attempting suicide each year in the United States. Comparable findings are observed outside the United States. A study using cross-country data from 1991 to 2017 for 36 OECD countries found that same-sex marriage legalization is associated with a decline in youth suicide of 1.191 deaths per 100,000 youth, with this reduction persisting at least into the medium term.

=== OECD countries ===
A study of country-level data across 36 OECD countries from 1991 to 2017 found that same-sex marriage legalization reduced the suicide rate of youth aged 10–24 by 1.191 deaths per 100,000 youth, equal to a 17.90% decrease. This decline was most pronounced in men for whom the suicide rate fell by 1.993 compared to a decrease of 0.348 for female youth, corresponding to decreases of 19.98% and 10.90%, respectively. The study worked by exploiting common factors in the youth suicide rate across time between the sample countries to econometrically estimate what the suicide rate would have been in the absence of same-sex marriage legalization for the countries and years that same-sex marriage was legal. The impact of same-sex marriage legalization could then be inferred by comparing this estimated counterfactual to the observed data across time, thereby enabling inferences to be interpreted causally. By virtue of this design, the researchers were able to establish that the association persisted at least into the medium term and that countries that recently adopted same-sex marriage (the Netherlands was the first country to legalize same-sex marriage in 2001 and, as of 2017, 18 of the 36 sample countries had followed suit) also experienced declines in youth suicide. These findings indicate that future legalization in other developed countries would also engender a decrease in youth suicide over time.

=== United States ===
A study of nationwide data from January 1999 to December 2015 revealed an association between states that established same-sex marriage and reduced rates of attempted suicide among all schoolchildren in grades 9–12, with a rate reduction in all schoolchildren (LGB and non-LGB youth) in grades 9–12 declining by 7% and a rate reduction among schoolchildren of a minority sexual orientation (LGBQ+ youth) in grades 9–12 of 14%, resulting in approximately 134,000 fewer children attempting suicide each year in the United States. The gradual manner in which same-sex marriage was established in the United States (expanding from 1 state in 2004 to all 50 states in 2015) allowed the researchers to compare the rate of attempted suicide among children in each state over the time period studied. Once same-sex marriage was established in a particular state, the reduction in the rate of attempted suicide among children in that state became permanent. No reduction in the rate of attempted suicide among children occurred in a particular state until that state recognized same-sex marriage. The lead researcher of the study observed that "laws that have the greatest impact on gay adults may make gay kids feel more hopeful for the future".

Other research shows that while this nationwide study has shown an association between states that established same-sex marriage and reduced rates of attempted suicide among all schoolchildren in grades 9–12, it does not show causation. According to Julie Cerel, director of the Suicide Prevention & Exposure Lab at the University of Kentucky, LGBTQ+ children "experience much more interpersonal stress from schools, from peers and from home". The Centers for Disease Control and Prevention survey found that more than 1 in 5 young adults (22%) attempted suicide in 2021. Stigma and violence against LGBTQ+ teens has greatly contributed to their mental health.

== Developmental psychology perspectives ==
The diathesis-stress model suggests that biological vulnerabilities predispose individuals to different conditions such as cancer, heart disease, and mental health conditions like major depression, a risk factor for suicide. Varying amounts of environmental stress increase the probability that these individuals will develop that condition. Minority stress theory suggests that minority status leads to increased discrimination from the social environment which leads to greater stress and health problems. In the presence of poor emotion regulation skills this can lead to poor mental health. Also, the differential susceptibility hypothesis suggests that for some individuals their physical and mental development is highly dependent on their environment in a "for-better-and-for-worse" fashion. That is, individuals who are highly susceptible will have better than average health in highly supportive environments and significantly worse than average health in hostile, violent environments. The model can help explain the unique health problems affecting LGBTQ populations including increased suicide attempts. For adolescents, the most relevant environments are the family, neighborhood, and school. Adolescent bullying – which is highly prevalent among sexual minority youths – is a chronic stressor that can increase risk for suicide via the diathesis-stress model. In a 2011 study of American lesbian, gay, and bisexual adolescents, Mark Hatzenbuehler found that a more conservative social environment elevated risk in suicidal behavior among all youth and that this effect was stronger for LGB youth. Furthermore, he found that the social environment partially mediated the relation between LGB status and suicidal behaviour. Hatzenbuehler found that even after such social as well as individual factors were controlled for, however, that "LGB status remained a significant predictor of suicide attempts."

== Projects ==
Several NGOs have started initiatives to attempt a reduction of LGBTQ youth suicides, such as The Trevor Project and the It Gets Better Project. Actions such as Ally Week, Day of Silence, and suicide intervention have helped to combat both self-harm and violence against LGBTQ people.

== Policy responses ==
=== Social and family support ===
Support from family members, service providers, and communities markedly reduces depressive symptoms and suicidal ideation among LGBTQ youth, emphasizing the need for service providers to foster communication between parents and LGBTQ adolescents. Educating family members and professionals such as teachers, counsellors, community workers, and medical staff to attend to LGBTQ youth's well-being and needs is recommended for increasing awareness and counteracting mental health challenges.

Psychosocial interventions, such as educational programs focused on increasing support from peers, family, and clinicians, can reduce the risk of suicide in LGBTQ youth populations. In particular, training pediatricians to address minority stress and affirm youth identities can improve mental health outcomes, and construct an environment that aids the disclosure of suicidal ideation or intent to health care professionals.

LGBTQ friendships and activism can increase self-affirmation and make LGBTQ youth more resilient towards minority stressors, thus improving mental health and potentially reducing suicide risk. Online websites, forums, chat groups, and information services, as well as real-world support groups in schools or communities can act as hubs of support for LGBTQ youth, helping them build connections and thus reduce feelings of isolation or rejection.

=== School-based interventions ===
Creating safe school environments which understand the risks of being LGBTQ and allow adolescents to express their identities and report problems could be central to improving youth mental health. Education programs for service providers, including teachers, are recommended to increase sensitivity and awareness around the suicide risk of LGBTQ youth. At-school support groups may help them connect with peers and reduce social isolation. Anti-discrimination policy and interventions to mitigate and reduce bullying are considered highly important for decreasing school victimisation.

== See also ==
- Gay bashing
- Gender differences in suicide
- Healthcare and the LGBTQ community
- LGBTQ health disparities
- LGBTQ Mormon suicides
- LGBTQ rights by country or territory
- LGBTQ youth vulnerability
- List of suicides that have been attributed to bullying
- Mental health inequality
- Mental health of LGBTQ people
- Suicidal ideation in South Korean LGBTQ youth
- Suicide among autistic individuals
- Sex and gender in suicide
- The Yogyakarta Principles
- LGBTQ people and Islam
