= Vow of silence =

Vow to maintain silence, usually for spirituality or protest

A vow of silence is a vow taken to avoid the use of speech. Although the concept is commonly associated with monasticism, no religious order takes such a vow, and even the most austere monastic orders such as the Carthusians have times in their schedule for talking.

In monasteries of the Western Christian tradition, the so-called "Great Silence" is the time during the night hours – usually after Compline until after the first canonical hours in the next morning – wherein speaking is more strictly prohibited.

Recently, the vow of silence has been embraced by some in secular society as means of protest or of deepening their spirituality. Silence is often seen as essential to deepening a relationship with God. It is also considered a virtue in some religions.

== Examples ==
=== Religious examples ===
Despite the common misconception, members of religious orders do not take a vow of silence. However, most monasteries have specific times and places (church, refectory, dormitory etc.) wherein speaking is more strictly prohibited. Outside some places and times there are usually accorded "recreations" during which conversation is permitted.

In the Indian religions, religious silence is called Mauna and the name for a sage muni (see, for example Sakyamuni) literally means "silent one". In Buddhism, it is also explicitly stated that "one does not become a sage simply because of a vow of silence" due to the prescription for disciples to also teach the Buddhist doctrine. The vow of silence is also relevant in the training of novices and is often cited as a way to resist the allures of samsara, including those posed by the opposite sex. Buddhist monks who take a vow of silence often carry an iron staff called khakkhara, which makes a metallic noise to frighten away animals. Since they cannot speak, the rattle of the staff also announces their arrival when they start begging for alms.

Mahatma Gandhi observed one day of silence a week, every Monday, and would not break this discipline for any reason.

=== Non-religious examples ===
Additionally, a vow of silence can be made to express a bold statement. This type may be to make a statement about issues such as child poverty. An example of this is the November 30th Vow of Silence for Free The Children, in which students in Canada take a 24-hour vow of silence to protest against poverty and child labour.

In the United States, the Day of Silence is the GLSEN’s annual day of action to spread awareness about the effects of the bullying and harassment of lesbian, gay, bisexual, transgender, queer, and questioning (LGBTQ) students. Participating students take a day-long vow of silence to symbolically represent the silencing of LGBTQ students.

A more ancient example of a non-religious vow of silence is Pythagoras, who allegedly imposed a strict rule of silence on his disciples.

=== In popular culture ===
- In Monty Python's Life of Brian, a hermit holds a vow of silence until the titular character breaks the hermit's foot.
- The 1974 film, Cockfighter, a man who trains fighting roosters vows to remain silent until one of his birds wins a championship.
- The 2006 film, Little Miss Sunshine, featured Dwayne, a Nietzsche-reading teenager who as the film begins has taken a vow of silence until he can accomplish his dream of becoming a test pilot.
- Garu, a character in the cartoon show Pucca, was mentioned to have taken a vow of silence.
- The Poopsmith, a character in the long-running Web Series Homestar Runner, has taken a vow of silence, and has only had two speaking roles in at least two decades that the series has been running.
- "The Cartoon", a season 9 episode of Seinfeld, featured Kramer taking a vow of silence due to his tendency to bluntly reveal things and not keep them to himself.
- The 2009 movie G.I. Joe: The Rise of Cobra featured Snake Eyes taking a vow of silence.
- The 2011 movie The Hangover: Part II featured a Buddhist monk taking a vow of silence as part of the film's plot.
- The 2017 television show The Good Place featured Jianyu, a Buddhist monk, taking a vow of silence.
- The HBO TV series Curb Your Enthusiasm (Season 8, Episode 5) featured a character taking a vow of silence. The episode title was also called "Vow of Silence".
- In the BBC series Call the Midwife, the Anglican nuns observe the Great Silence from Compline until the morning, as repeatedly referenced throughout all 9 seasons (as of December 2020).
- The 2023 Netflix series Carol & the End of the World featured a monk taking a vow of silence, only to break it when a gun is pointed at him.
- The 2006 song "Vow of Silence" by Lemon Demon is sung from the perspective of a talkative person accepting that they won't be able to say everything, so they'll take a vow of silence instead.
- The 2004 ABC series Lost (Season 3, Episode 17) featured Desmond finishing his vow of silence after joining a monastery.

== See also ==
- Day of Silence
- Moment of Silence
- Vrata

== Bibliography ==
- Obrecht, Edmond (1913). "Silence" . In Herbermann, Charles (ed.). Catholic Encyclopedia. New York: Robert Appleton Company.
