= Silence Day =

Silence Day or Day of Silence may refer to:

- Day of Silence, a day in April designated to protest the bullying and harassment of lesbian, gay, bisexual, and transgender (LGBT) students
- Nyepi, a Balinese "Day of Silence" that is commemorated every Isakawarsa (Saka new year)
- Silence Day, an annual July 10 observance of silence for adherents of Indian author and spiritual figure Meher Baba
