= Julie Cerel =

Clinical psychologist

Julie Cerel is a clinical psychologist known for her contributions to the field of suicidology, including suicide exposure, prevention and bereavement. She currently serves as a Professor in the College of Social Work at the University of Kentucky, where she holds the Wilson Professorship of Mental Health. Cerel is also the director of the Suicide Prevention & Exposure Lab (SPEL) at the University of Kentucky.

== Education ==
Cerel earned her Ph.D. in clinical psychology from the Ohio State University. She completed her internship and post-doctoral fellowship in child clinical psychology at West Virginia University, followed by a specialized post-doctoral fellowship in suicide prevention at the University of Rochester. Her undergraduate degree is from Kenyon College, where she earned an honorary Ph.D. In 2023.

== Career ==
Cerel's research focuses on suicide exposure, bereavement and the experiences of suicide attempt survivors. The #not6 campaign, which she contributed to, argues against the concept that each suicide affects only six people, and that the impact extends to approximately 135 individuals.

Cerel served as the President of the American Association of Suicidology from 2017–2019. In 2023, she was elected as a fellow of the American Psychological Association in recognition of her contributions to the field. She has authored over one hundred peer reviewed academic publications and co-authored Seeking Hope: Stories of the Suicide Bereaved.

== Grants ==
Cerel's research has been supported by various organizations, including the Military Suicide Research Consortium from the U.S. Department of Defense, the Patient-Centered Outcomes Research Institute (PCORI), the National Institute of Mental Health (NIMH), the Centers for Disease Control and Prevention (CDC), the Substance Abuse and Mental Health Services Administration (SAMHSA) and the American Foundation for Suicide Prevention.
