= Political positions of Harry Reid =

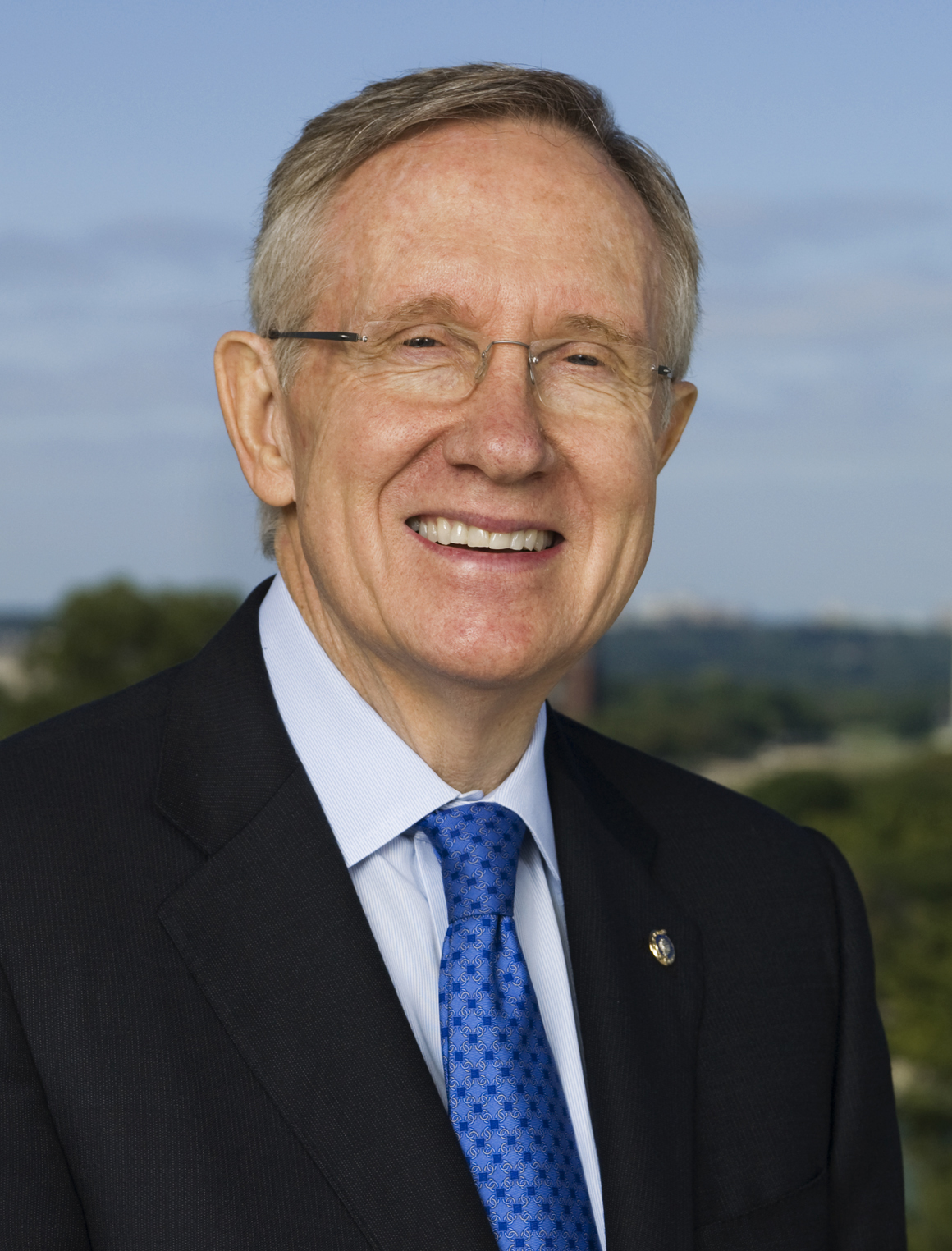
Reid in 2009

Former United States Senator Harry Reid declared his position on many political issues through his public comments and his senatorial voting record.

== Abortion and the Supreme Court ==
=== Abortion issues ===
Senator Reid, reflecting an anti-abortion view, believed that Roe v. Wade should be overturned. He stated in a 1998 National Political Awareness Test that he believed "Abortions should be legal only when the pregnancy resulted from incest, rape, or when the life of the woman is endangered." In 1999, he voted against an amendment that explicitly expressed support for Roe v. Wade. He received a 100% rating from NARAL in 2001, and a 27% rating in 2003, as well as a 57% rating by Planned Parenthood in 2006 and an 85% rating in 2013. Reid however has voted against the Nelson-Hatch-Casey amendment in the Senate which proposed to ban federal funding of plans that cover abortion.

Reid voted several times to ban what is known as the "intact dilation and evacuation" or "partial-birth abortion" procedure, a measure supported by Republicans and several Democrats. In 2003, he supported alternate language than the act that eventually passed that would have banned all late-term abortions, while allowing exceptions for the life and health of the mother. Several polls have stated that a majority of Americans support banning "partial birth abortion" when the pollsters describe it as such. Reid also voted in favor of the Unborn Victims of Violence Act, in favor of parental notification in the case of minors undergoing out-of-state abortions, and in favor of maintaining the ban on abortions and supplying birth control for US military personnel.

=== Pregnancy prevention and clinic safety ===
In 1994, Reid voted for the Freedom of Access to Clinic Entrances Act, which prohibited the use of intimidation or physical force to prevent or discourage people from gaining access to a reproductive health care facility. He was the co-sponsor of an amendment to the bill which allows anyone to exercise freedom to worship at a healthcare facility. It allows reproductive healthcare professionals to gain access to a clinic without being physically threatened and, at the same time, allows religious organizations to pray outside of abortion clinics.

Reid introduced legislation in 2006 co-sponsored by Hillary Clinton that would fund abortion prevention efforts such as giving women broader access to contraception. In a press release about their "Prevention First Amendment," Clinton and Reid stated that for every dollar spent on pregnancy prevention, three are saved by pregnancy and birth-related expenses borne by Medicaid. The bill received Republican opposition and failed.

Reid voted in favor of an amendment that would over-turn the Mexico City Policy. The policy bans U.S. aid to overseas health organizations that give men and women birth control, provide information about abortion procedures, or that perform abortion procedures as part of a "family planning policy". Opponents of the policy argue that the ban keeps funds from going to non-governmental organizations distributing condoms and USAID-donated birth control and has resulted in an increase in unwanted pregnancies, and thus an increase in the rate of abortion. Opponents also argue that the ban promotes restrictions on free speech as well as restrictions on accurate medical information. Supporters of the policy have argued, using the example of the Philippines, that the ban prevents overseas health organizations from using US government funds to disobey the abortion and birth control laws of their own countries. Supporters also argue that the policy prevents the health agencies from promoting abortion at the expense of other birth control methods. The amendment overturning the Mexico City Policy passed the Senate by a 53–41 vote. President Bush vowed to veto any legislation eliminating the policy.

Reid received a 100% rating from NARAL in 2001 and voted with the interests of the National Family Planning and Reproductive Health Association 68% of the time from 1995 to 2004. In 2003 and 2004, he received 29% and 20% ratings, respectively, from NARAL Pro-Choice America. From 2005 to 2006, "Reid supported the interests of the National Right to Life Committee 50 percent." Planned Parenthood gave him a 57% rating in 2006.

=== Supreme Court nominations ===
In 2005, Reid voted against Supreme Court of the United States nominee John Roberts, in part because of pressure from his constituents. About 64% of Reid's constituents in Nevada identify themselves as "pro-choice." Reid also voted against nominee Samuel Alito, but argued against the pursuit of a filibuster of Alito because the Republican majority leader at the time, Bill Frist, had threatened to institute what he and other Republicans called the "Constitutional option" and what Democrats called the "nuclear option". If implemented, the option would have eliminated the filibuster and made a simple majority – rather than a three-fifths majority – enough to move forward any federal judicial confirmations.

== Bush administration and Supreme Court ==
Reid made headlines in May 2005 when he said of George W. Bush, "The man's father is a wonderful human being. I think this guy is a loser." Reid later apologized for these comments. Reid also called Supreme Court Associate Justice Clarence Thomas an "embarrassment" and referred to Federal Reserve Chairman Alan Greenspan as a "political hack."

== Civil rights ==
Reid stated "I believe marriage should be between a man and a woman" and voted for the Defense of Marriage Act which said, "No state (or other political subdivision within the United States) needs to treat a relationship between persons of the same sex as a marriage, even if the relationship is considered a marriage in another state.". Reid voted against the Federal Marriage Amendment which "would have limited marriage in the United States to unions of one man and one woman. The FMA would also have prevented judicial extension of marriage rights to same-sex or other unmarried couples, as well as preventing polygamy." and against "prohibiting same-sex basic training." He has also voted for "prohibiting job discrimination based on sexual orientation" and for "adding sexual orientation to definition of hate crimes".

Reid supported the original Patriot Act passed shortly after the September 11 attacks. He opposed the later versions of the act, stating on the Senate floor in December 2005 that "The final bill was written by Republican conferees working behind closed doors with Justice Department lawyers." He argued that "It leaves largely in place a definition of domestic terrorism so broad it could be read to cover acts of civil disobedience." Reid later boasted to Democratic activists that "We killed the Patriot Act." Reid clarified his statement later that day, saying that he only intended to add more safeguards to the act. Nonpartisan media analysis website FactCheck.org later stated that "obviously, he chose his words poorly" and "Reid's words are grossly misleading". Reid said on Fox News Sunday that he considered the act's defeat worth celebrating. He remarked that "I'm opposed to evil terrorists as most Americans are. But we still believe in this little thing called the Constitution."

In spring 2006, Reid joined an 89 to 10 bipartisan vote reauthorizing the act, saying "Our support for the Patriot Act does not mean a blank check for the president.... What we tried to do on a bipartisan basis is have a better bill. It has been improved." Nine Democratic senators such as Russell Feingold, Robert Byrd, Daniel Akaka, and Patrick Leahy along with Independent Jim Jeffords voted against the bill. The Wall Street Journal's editorial page called his vote, in context with his earlier statement, "Reid's "mission accomplished" moment".

Reid supported a constitutional amendment to prevent flag desecration. However, Reid criticized Senate Republicans for bringing up anti-desecration legislation, calling it one of "the 'pet' issues of the right wing".

== Death penalty ==
Reid strongly supported use of the death penalty, having voted in favor of limiting death penalties appeals and executing criminals who were minors when they committed their crime.

== Energy policy ==
Reid supported legislation that would cut $15 billion in tax breaks for large oil companies and put the money toward renewable energy sources. In an op-ed to the Reno Gazette Journal, Reid wrote, "I am working on a bipartisan energy bill that will create thousands of Nevada jobs, save consumers money, address global warming, and make our country safer. We can do that by reducing our reliance on oil and investing in the renewable energy sources that are abundant in our state." The advocacy group "Campaign for America's Future" gave him a 100% rating from 2005 to 2006.

However, he was criticized to be one a main culprit for the failure of the 2009 United Nations Climate Change Conference, as the Democrats' majority in Congress during his Senate leadership had not been used to enact climate-protection legislation prior to the conference.

=== ENN Mojave Energy controversy ===
In 2012, Reid applied pressure on NV Energy to support a solar power plant, proposed by ENN Mojave Energy, to be located near Laughlin, Nevada. NV Energy declined, stating that it has met its renewable energy requirements. The project was initially envisioned to supply renewable energy to California, but is unable due to a regulation in the California's Renewable Portfolio Standard. Reid's son, Rory Reid, is one of ENN Mojave Energy's attorneys.

The project is located in Laughlin, Nevada. ENN Energy said they will invest up to $10 billion in the US throughout the next decade, adding thousands of jobs to the United States and Nevada's economy. The project is highly supported by Clark County commissioners and Governor Sandoval. Governor Sandoval toured ENN headquarters in September 2012, showing bipartisan support for the project.

== Don't Ask, Don't Tell ==
Reid supported the repeal of Don't Ask Don't Tell, which was a hot topic in politics during President Barack Obama's administration, especially in his first term until it was finally repealed by Congress and signed into law by President Obama on December 22, 2010.

== Ethics reform ==
In January 2007, Harry Reid brought a Senate ethics reform bill to a vote. These rules passed overwhelmingly on a bipartisan basis – 96 to 2. The bill was a reaction to Republican scandals in the U.S. House of Representatives. The ethics bill bars members from accepting gifts, meals, and trips from lobbyists and organization employing them. It also bars senators from borrowing corporate jets for travel and compels senators to disclose the names of sponsors, or authors, of bills and specific projects.

== Fiscal cliff ==
On January 1, 2013, Congress passed the American Taxpayer Relief Act of 2012 to avert the fiscal cliff and the next day President Barack Obama signed the Act into law. (Public Law No: 112-240) The "fiscal cliff" deal was primarily enacted to avoid automatic tax hikes and spending cuts, but also included provisions extending portions of the United States farm bill for nine months through September 30, 2013. Reid has demonstrated a commitment to working on a new five-year Farm Bill by reintroducing last session's Senate Farm Bill in the new 113th Congress.

== Gun politics ==
Reid voted for the Protection of Lawful Commerce in Arms Act, a bill designed "to prohibit civil liability actions from being brought or continued against manufacturers, distributors, dealers, or importers of firearms or ammunition for damages... resulting from the misuse of their products" and against the ban on semi-automatic firearms. He also voted in favor of the Brady bill and background checks at gun shows.

On July 10, 2009, the National Rifle Association (NRA) wrote a letter to members in Nevada praising Harry Reid for fighting a reinstatement of the federal assault weapons ban as well as his support for the Protection of Lawful Commerce in Arms Act, ("The purpose of the act is to prevent firearms manufacturers and dealers from being held liable for crimes committed with their products. However, both manufacturers and dealers can still be held liable for damages resulting from defective products, breach of contract, criminal misconduct, and other actions for which they are directly responsible.") his sponsorship of S. 659, his opposition to certain anti-gun amendments, and several other pro-gun rights votes. The National Rifle Association has supported Reid in primary elections.

In 2014, Gun Owners of America gave an F− grade to Reid. The group rated Reid poorly because Reid refused to strike a law prohibiting doctors from asking their patients about their gun ownership. It also rated Reid poorly because he voted to increase the maximum term of imprisonment for selling firearms or ammunition to any person knowing that the buyer is prohibited from owning such firearms or ammunition due to being put into the NICS system for PTSD.

== Healthcare ==
- Disease Research Funding
  - Conquer Childhood Cancer Act of 2007 – S 911, 2007; voted yes; established a childhood cancer research database and advanced biomedical research.
  - Stem Cell Research Bill of 2005 – HR 810; voted yes; allows the Department of Health and Human Services to use stem cells for medical and disease research.
  - American Recovery and Reinvestment Act of 2009 – H 1, 2009; voted yes; Included $10 billion for the National Institutes of Health’s research activities for many different diseases.
- Family Smoking Prevention and Tobacco Control Act – HR 1256, 2009; FDA regulation of the tobacco industry; co-sponsor; voted yes.
- Health Care Reform
  - Patients' Bill of Rights – S 1052, 2001; voted yes; This bill included many of the provisions in the Affordable Care Act, but it did not include an insurance mandate for every American.
  - Patient Protection and Affordable Care Act – HR 3590, 2010; voted yes; The Affordable Care Act is a major overhaul of the healthcare system in America. Some of the changes included insurance companies not being able to deny service to those with pre-existing conditions, limit services and put life-time caps on coverage. The bill also included an insurance mandate for every American.
- Medicare
  - Outpatient Prescription Drugs Amendment – S AMDT 3598, 2000; voted yes; would provide prescription drugs to patients with Medicare.
  - Medicare Prescription Drug Benefit Bill – S 1, 2003; voted yes; added prescription drug benefits to Medicare.
  - Medicare Part D Amendment – HR4297, AMDT 2730, 2006; voted yes; Included six month enrollment period for Medicare Part D and that beneficiaries could change plans within a year’s time.
  - Medicare Bill – HR 6331, 2008; voted yes; voted yes to override veto; Expanded Medicare coverage for certain programs and changed regulations involving Medicare fee-for-service programs.
- Prescription Drugs
  - Greater Access to Affordable Pharmaceuticals Act – S 812, 2002; voted yes; introduced importation of prescription drugs from Canada into the United States.
  - State Children’s Health Insurance Program Reauthorization and Expansion – HR 2, 2009; voted yes; Expanded coverage for the State Children’s Health Insurance Program, which also included a tobacco excise tax increase from .61 to $1.00 per pack.
- Tort Reform
  - Patient Lawsuit Amendment – S 1434 S AMDT 1250, 1999; Voted no on limiting medical malpractice lawsuits to $250,000.
- Veterans Health Affairs
  - Health Care for Veterans Amendment – 2005 – HR2863, AMDT 1937; voted yes; established that the Veterans Health Administration be held at the FY 2005 funding level, and would continue to be at that level, while adjusting for inflation and changes in the number of veterans using the program.

== Immigration ==
Reid called "immigration reform" one of his top priorities for the 110th Congress. He supported the Comprehensive Immigration Reform Act of 2007 (S. 1348), ("[which] would have provided legal status and a path to citizenship for the approximately 12 to 20 million illegal immigrants currently residing in the United States.") but pulled it from the Senate floor because he believed too many amendments to the legislation were being introduced.

Reid supported the DREAM Act which would make it easier for young people who are not citizens of the United States, but are permanent residents, to attend college or university in the United States. The DREAM Act was introduced to the Senate by Senators Orrin Hatch (R-UT) and Richard Durbin (D-IL)

Reid opposed a Constitutional amendment to make English the national language of the United States, calling the proposal "racist."

Reid's positions on immigration have changed considerably over a relatively short period of time. Only fifteen years ago his position was in favor of sharply reducing legal immigration and of not amnestying undocumented entrants and overstays.

== Foreign Policy ==
=== Iraq ===
Reid voted in January 1991 to authorize military force in Iraq to liberate Kuwait. On the Senate floor, Reid quoted from John F. Kennedy's 1963 State of the Union speech by saying "the mere absence of war is not Peace". According to The New York Times, the "Senate approved the use of military force by a vote of 52 to 47" with ten out of the fifty-five Senate Democrats voting in support.

Reid voted in support of the 2003 invasion of Iraq. In March 2007, he voted in favor of "redeploying US troops out of Iraq by March 2008". Reid said on April 19, 2007 "I believe, myself that the secretary of state, secretary of defense, and – you have to make your own decisions as to what the president knows – this war is lost and the surge is not accomplishing anything as indicated by the extreme violence in Iraq yesterday." Reid said he told President Bush he thought the war could not be won through military force, although he said the U.S. could still pursue political, economic and diplomatic means to bring peace to Iraq. He also said, "As long as we follow the President's path in Iraq, the war is lost. But there is still a chance to change course and we must change course. No one wants us to succeed in the Middle East more than I do. But there must be a change of course. Our brave men and women overseas have passed every test with flying colors. They have earned our pride and our praise. More important, they deserve a strategy worthy of their sacrifice."

In an April 22, 2007 appearance on FOX News Sunday, Reid's Senatorial colleague Charles Schumer stated, "The war is not lost. And Harry Reid believes this – we Democrats believe it – if we change our mission and focus it more narrowly on counter-terrorism, going after an Al Qaida camp that might arise in Iraq. That would take many fewer troops out of harm's way. That's what we're pushing the president to do."

On September 10, 2007, the Commander of the Multi-National Force in Iraq David H. Petraeus presented a "Report to Congress on the Situation in Iraq". He stated that "As a bottom line up front, the military objectives of the surge are, in large measure, being met." The New York Times reported on September 11 that Petraeus had "warned in stark terms against the kind of rapid pullback favored by the Democratic majorities in the House and Senate". Reid stated that the general's "plan is just more of the same" and "is neither a drawdown or a change in mission that we need." He also said that Congressional Democrats plan "change the course of the war". Petraeus will "make a further assessment and [offer] recommendations next March".

== Stem cell research ==
Reid supported stem cell research, referring to the research as "the next generation of medical breakthroughs." He had stated that "Democrats will not give up the fight for stem cell research. It is a fight America must win."

== Technology ==
Reid's voting record on technology is as follows:

- Voted NO on restoring $550M in funding for Amtrak for 2007. (March 2006)
- Voted YES on disallowing FCC approval of larger media conglomerates. (September 2003)
- Voted YES on Internet sales tax moratorium. (October 1998)
- Voted YES on telecomm deregulation. (February 1996)
- Promoted internet via Congressional Internet Caucus. (January 2001)

== Yucca Mountain ==
Harry Reid firmly opposed the proposed Yucca Mountain nuclear waste repository in Nevada. He's quoted as saying the concept "is dead. It'll never happen." Reid, who had long been an opponent of the centralized nuclear waste facility in his home state, said he would continue to work to block completion of the project. "It's dying on its own. It's just happening. You don't need just a sudden demise. It's breathing really hard. Just let it lay there a while and it'll be dead," says Reid.

== See also ==
- National Survivors of Suicide Day
