= Suicide survivor =

Loved ones of people who died by suicide

A suicide survivor or survivor of suicide is one of the family and friends of someone who has died by suicide.

Given the social stigma associated with suicide, suicide survivors are often unable to cope with their loss and grief using normal support systems, and are "forced into a privatized and individualistic mode of grieving," making the healing process even more difficult.

Estimates are that for every suicide, "there are seven to ten people intimately affected".

== See also ==
- International Survivors of Suicide Loss Day
- World Suicide Prevention Day
- Suicide bereavement
