= Suicide attempt =

Act of trying to kill oneself which the person survives

A suicide attempt is an act in which an individual tries to kill themselves but survives. Mental health professionals discourage describing suicide attempts as "failed" or "unsuccessful", as doing so may imply that a suicide resulting in death is a successful or desirable outcome.

== Epidemiology ==
In the United States, the National Institute of Mental Health reports there are 11 nonfatal suicide attempts for every suicide death. The American Association of Suicidology reports higher numbers, stating that there are 25 suicide attempts for every suicide completion. The ratio of suicide attempts to suicide death is about 25:1 in youths, compared to about 4:1 in elderly. A 2008 review found that nonfatal self-injury is more common in women, and a separate study from 2008/2009 found suicidal thoughts higher among females, as well as significant differences between genders for suicide planning and suicide attempts.

A similar trend is seen in Australia, where the National Mental Health Commission reports 150 attempts for every 9 deaths each day. A majority of attempts come from young adults and adolescents, however exact statistics for suicide attempts haven't been sufficiently researched.

Suicide attempts are more common among adolescents in developing countries than developed ones. A 12-month prevalence of suicide attempt in developing countries between 2003 and 2015 was reported as 17%.

== Parasuicide and self-injury ==
Without commonly agreed-upon operational definitions, some suicidology researchers regard many suicide attempts as parasuicide (para- meaning near) or self harm behavior, rather than "true" suicide attempts, if they were performed without the intention to die.

== Methods ==
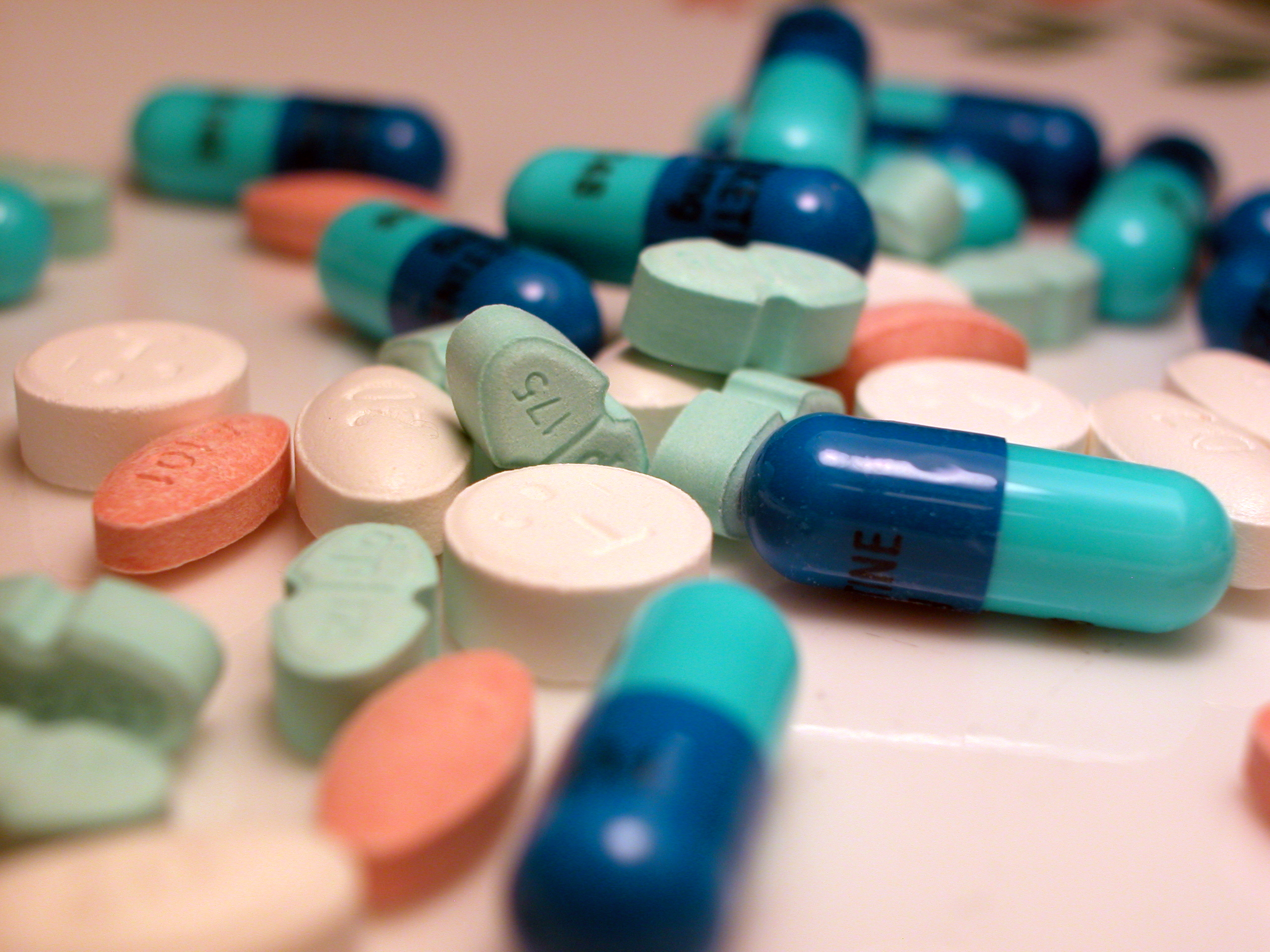
Overdosing on medication is the most common method used in suicide attempts, but this method rarely results in death.

Some suicide methods have higher rates of lethality than others. The use of firearms results in death 90% of the time. Wrist-slashing has a much lower lethality rate, comparatively, since for every suicide by wrist cutting, there are many more nonfatal attempts, so that the number of actual deaths using this method is very low. 75% of all suicide attempts are by drug overdose, a method that is often thwarted because the drug is nonlethal, or is used at a nonlethal dosage. These people survive 97% of the time.

== Repetition ==
A nonfatal suicide attempt is the strongest known clinical predictor of eventual suicide. Suicide risk among self-harm patients is hundreds of times higher than in the general population. However, it is estimated that only about 10–15% of suicide attempt survivors eventually die by suicide. The mortality risk is highest during the first months and years after the attempt: almost 1% of individuals who attempt suicide will die by suicide if the attempt is repeated within one year. Recent meta-analytic evidence suggests that the association between suicide attempt and suicidal death may not be as strong as it was thought before.

== Outcomes ==
Suicide attempts can result in serious and permanent injuries and/or disabilities. At least 700,000 Americans survive a suicide attempt each year. People who attempt either hanging or carbon monoxide poisoning and survive can face permanent brain damage due to cerebral anoxia. People who take a drug overdose and survive can face severe organ damage (e.g., liver failure). Individuals who jump from a height and survive may face irreversible damage to multiple organs, as well as the spine and brain.

While a majority sustain injuries that allow them to be released following emergency room treatment, a significant minority—about 116,000—are hospitalized, of whom 110,000 are eventually discharged alive. Their average hospital stay is 79 days. Some 89,000, 17% of these people, are permanently disabled.

== Criminalization of attempted suicide ==
Historically in the Christian church, people who attempted suicide were excommunicated because of the religiously polarizing nature of the topic. While previously criminally punishable, attempted suicide is no longer illegal in most Western countries. It remains a criminal offense in most Islamic countries. In the United States, suicide is not illegal and almost no country in Europe currently considers attempted suicide to be a crime.

In India, attempted suicide was decriminalized by the Mental Healthcare Act, 2017, while Singapore removed attempted suicide from their criminal code in 2020; previously it had been punishable by up to one year in prison.

Many other countries still prosecute suicide attempts. As of 2012, attempted suicide is a criminal offense in Uganda, and as of 2013, it is criminalized in Ghana.

Despite having its own laws, Maryland still reserves the right to prosecute people under the English common laws that were in place when the United Colonies declared independence in 1776. These laws were used to convict a man for attempted suicide in 2018, resulting in a three-year suspended sentence and two years of supervised probation.

== See also ==
- International Survivors of Suicide Loss Day
- Mental health first aid
- Suicidal ideation
- Suicide crisis
- World Suicide Prevention Day
