= Ally Week =

Youth LGBT support week

Ally Week is a national youth-led effort encouraging students to be allies with the LGBT (lesbian, gay, bisexual and transgender) members of their community in standing against bullying and harassment. It takes place in K-12 schools and colleges. It is led in the same spirit as Day of Silence: to educate on anti-LGBT harassment issues. Ally Week is usually held in September or October.

== History ==
Ally Week was created by Joe Montana and other youth members of the GLSEN National JumpStart Student Leadership Team in October 2005. The event has grown since.

In 2008, the pledge cards were mistakenly used with kindergartners. Opponents of gay marriage used this to correlate to the Proposition 8 battle in California, and GLSEN stated they would review materials and ensure they were appropriate for all grade levels.

In 2010 the campaign encouraged awareness of the Safe Schools Improvement Act, similar to the "Dignity For All Students Act" (New York State) legislation to protect LGBT students from bullying.

== Premise ==
The goal of Ally Week is to diminish stereotypes and exclusion while highlighting that peer support for LGBT students is stronger than the students themselves may have thought existed. Allies are identified as supporters but not necessarily members of a marginalized group.

During Ally Week, people are encouraged to sign an Ally pledge, stating that they will not use anti-LGBT language and slurs. They pledge to intervene, if possible, to stop bullying and harassment, and to support efforts for safer schools.

== Effects ==
In a survey of 240 undergraduates regarding what peer support they felt LGBT students had, research found that their personal attitudes were significantly more positive than they thought their friends and fellow students held.

== See also ==
- Youth voice
- Youth service
- Civic engagement
- Suicide among LGBT youth

== Sources ==
- Goldman, Linda, Coming out, coming in: nurturing the well-being and inclusion of gay youth in mainstream society, CRC Press, 2008, ISBN 0-415-95824-5, ISBN 978-0-415-95824-0.
- Marcus, Eric, What If Someone I Know Is Gay?: Answers to Questions about What It Means to Be Gay and Lesbian, Simon and Schuster, 2007, ISBN 1-4169-4970-4, ISBN 978-1-4169-4970-1.
- Meyer, Elizabeth J., Gender and Sexual Diversity in Schools: Volume 10 of Explorations of Educational Purpose, Springer, 2010, ISBN 90-481-8558-0, ISBN 978-90-481-8558-0.
- Windmeyer, Shane L., The Advocate college guide for LGBT+ students, Alyson Books, 2006, ISBN 1-55583-857-X, 9781555838577.
