= Suicide bereavement =

Type of grieving

Suicide bereavement is the experience of those who are grieving the loss of someone to suicide. Over 800,000 individuals die by suicide every year. It was stated by Shneidman (1978) that every suicide leaves behind 6 heavily affected "survivor-victims" and new research shows that each suicide leaves behind approximately 135 who personally knew the decedent.

Individuals experiencing suicide bereavement experience different challenges than those otherwise bereaved. Across 41 studies that examined these differences, the suicide bereaved experienced higher levels of blaming, stigma, shame and rejection. Those who lose someone to suicide may experience delays in the healing process.

== Complicated grief ==
Complicated grief is grief whose symptoms do not decline over time. 10% to 20% of individuals survivors develop complicated grief. Individuals who develop complicated grief are likely to experience physical impairments to their daily functioning, with accompanying suffering. These symptoms persist without proper treatment, which became Complicated Grief Treatment.

== Grief stages ==
Elisabeth Kübler-Ross, a Swiss-American psychiatrist, developed a model that encapsulates five stages of grief that an individual is likely to experience after a loss. However, there is no support for people going through these stages in order or experiencing all of them.

1. Denial: Can help the individual minimize the overwhelming pain of loss. This stage allows the individual to slow the processing of painful imagery, potentially reducing the pain.
2. Anger: The individual adjusts to their new reality while likely experiencing extreme emotional discomfort. Anger tends to be the first feeling the individual experiences when they realize that their emotions are related to their loss.
3. Bargaining: In this stage, the individual attempts to negotiate with a higher power.
4. Depression: During the grieving process, bargaining has failed and the individual faces the facts of their loss. They are more likely to internalize their feelings and experience extreme sadness. They may find it difficult to reach out to others and experience isolation.
5. Acceptance: In this last stage, the individual no longer resists the reality of their situation, leaving mostly sadness and regret.

== Suicide risk ==
Compared to other bereaved, the suicide bereaved are at a higher risk of experiencing suicidal ideation. According to a 2002 study, results showed that suicide bereaved individuals were 1.6 times more likely to experience thoughts of suicide, 2.9 times more likely to have a suicide plan, and 3.7 times more likely to have made a suicide attempt. These individuals may conclude that suicide is the only viable solution to their pain. Other suicide bereaved may want to feel closer to the person they lost by ending their life the same way their loved one did.

== Stigma ==
Despite efforts to de-stigmatize suicide, unlike other types of death, suicide remains stigmatized. Individuals who have lost their loved ones to suicide have reported difficulty with talking to others about their loss due to feeling uncomfortable talking about the topic. Additionally, certain religions reject those who have committed suicide. The suicide bereaved individuals may feel shame, making them uncomfortable sharing their loss in their religious group. Insurance policies may exclude death benefits for suicides. Survivors of suicide often experience difficulty healing due to this stigma.

== Treatment ==
=== Support groups ===
Support groups can be beneficial for the suicide bereaved, because this is a nonthreatening place where they can experience catharsis among others in a similar situation. Homogeneous support groups are typically more helpful than broader bereavement support groups. Such groups offer reassurances that feelings are acceptable. Individuals also may receive coping recommendations for holidays, talking to others and other now-difficult situations.

Support groups can be found by visiting the International Association for Suicide Bereavement (IASP) website, which is affiliated with the World Health Organization. The American Association of Suicidology (AAS) and the American Foundation for Suicide Prevention (AFSP) also has a list of 400+ support groups across the United States.

=== Psychotherapy ===
Support groups on their own may not help individuals who develop a mental illness, such as Major Depressive Disorder (MDD) or Posttraumatic Stress Disorder (PTSD). The suicide bereaved are encouraged to seek clinicians who specialize in psychotherapy and/or medication management. A combination of education, psychotherapy and medication have been shown to be the most effective treatments.

=== Complicated grief treatment ===
Complicated grief treatment (CGT) incorporates elements of cognitive behavioral therapy (CBT), exposure and motivational interviewing. This type of psychotherapy facilitates the essential process of accepting loss. The combination of exposure techniques with cognitive restructuring has been shown to help individuals experience life satisfaction and engage in meaningful relationships.
