= Kevin Jennings =

American educator, author, and administrator

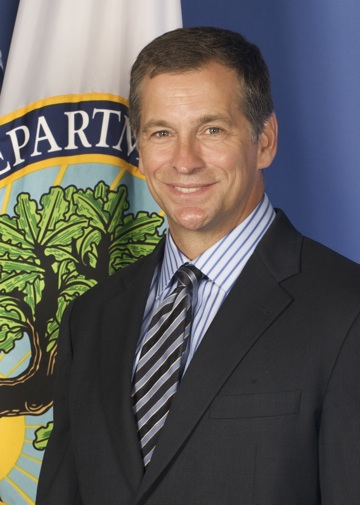

Assistant Deputy Secretary for the Office of Safe and Drug-Free Schools at the U.S. Department of Education
- In office July 6, 2009 – June 2011

Personal details
- Born: May 8, 1963 (age 63) Fort Lauderdale, Florida, U.S.
- Spouse: Thomas Fitzgerald
- Education: Harvard University (BA); Columbia University (MEd); New York University (MBA)
- Occupation: Educator, author, nonprofit executive
- Awards: National Education Association Virginia Uribe Award for Creative Leadership in Human Rights
- Website: Official website

Kevin Brett Jennings (born May 8, 1963) is an American educator, author, and administrator. He was the assistant deputy secretary for the Office of Safe and Drug-Free Schools at the U.S. Department of Education from July 6, 2009 to June 2011.

Jennings holds degrees from Harvard University, Columbia University's Teachers College, and the Stern School of Business at New York University. He became a teacher and was named one of fifty "Terrific Teachers Making a Difference" by the Edward Calesa Foundation; he also came out as gay to his students. In 1990, he founded the Gay and Lesbian Independent School Teachers Education Network (later changed to the Gay, Lesbian and Straight Education Network), which seeks to end discrimination, harassment, and bullying based on sexual orientation and gender identity. In 1992, he was named co-chair of the Education Committee of the Governor's Commission on Gay and Lesbian Youth in Massachusetts. Jennings has authored seven books, including one which won the Lambda Literary Award.

== Early life, family and education ==
Jennings was born in Fort Lauderdale, Florida. He was the youngest of five children to Chester Henry, an itinerant Southern Baptist preacher, and Alice Verna (Johnson) Jennings. His family was poor and constantly moved around the South as his father sought a permanent post. His father died when Jennings was eight years old and the family was living in a Lewisville, North Carolina, trailer park. From then on, he grew up in a rural atmosphere that was intolerant of African Americans and gay people; several of his cousins and uncles were in the Ku Klux Klan. He was constantly taunted and bullied. "The first day of 10th grade I actually refused to go back to school because I simply wasn't going to go back to a place where I was bullied every day." He attended Paisley Magnet School in Winston-Salem, North Carolina, where he did well academically but was beaten by classmates for what they saw as effeminate behavior. He attempted suicide after realizing he was gay. After he and his mother moved to Hawaii, he graduated from Radford High School in Honolulu.

Jennings then attended and received a bachelor's degree magna cum laude in history from Harvard University, where he delivered the Harvard Oration at the 1985 commencement. He returned years later to obtain additional degrees. He earned a master's degree in interdisciplinary studies in education at Columbia University's Teachers College in 1994, and an MBA from New York University's Stern School of Business in 1999. While at Columbia in 1993, he was named a Joseph Klingenstein Fellow.

== Teaching career ==
He became a high school history teacher, first at Moses Brown School in Providence, Rhode Island, from 1985 to 1987. He then taught at Concord Academy in Concord, Massachusetts, from 1987 to 1995, where he was chair of the history department. In 1992, the Edward Calesa Foundation named Jennings one of fifty "Terrific Teachers Making a Difference". Most of his students accepted him when he revealed his sexual identity after years of keeping it secret.

== GLSEN and writing ==
While at Concord Academy in 1988, Jennings started the nations' first gay-straight alliance together with a female student. Jennings then co-founded the Gay and Lesbian Independent School Teacher Network (GLISTeN) in Boston in 1990, to address the problems facing LGBT students. It held its first conference the following year, when it changed its name to the Gay and Lesbian School Teachers Network (GLSTN). The organization started out as a small local one but gained a strong supportive reaction. In 1992, Jennings was appointed by Governor William Weld to co-chair the Education Committee of the Governor's Commission on Gay and Lesbian Youth. He was the principal author of "Making Schools Safe for Gay & Lesbian Youth", a commission report. The Massachusetts State Board of Education adopted the report as policy in May 1993, and the state became the first in the U.S. to outlaw discrimination of public school students on the basis of sexual orientation in December 1993.

In 1994, he wrote Becoming Visible: A Reader in Gay & Lesbian History for High School and College Students, the "first book of its kind" for a high school audience. Jennings moved GLSTN to New York to accompany his studying, and he decided to make the organization national in scope. In doing so, he also changed its name to the Gay, Lesbian and Straight Education Network (GLSEN), to give it a broader focus. The organization seeks to end discrimination, harassment, and bullying based on sexual orientation and gender identity. In both 1995 and 1996, Jennings was in Out magazine's list of "Top 100 Newsmakers and Earthshakers".

In 1997, Newsweek magazine named Jennings to its "Century Club" of people likely to make a difference in the 21st century. By 1999, Jennings had earned his MBA, and GLSEN was headquartered in the Chelsea, Manhattan neighborhood of New York City and had a staff of 18 and budget of $2.5 million.

In 1998, he won the Lambda Literary Award in the Children's/Young Adult category for his book Telling Tales Out of School. He has published six books on gay rights and education. His works have described his own past as a closeted gay student.

In July 2004, Jennings received the National Education Association (NEA)'s Virginia Uribe Award for Creative Leadership in Human Rights. NEA Republican Educators Caucus chairwoman Diane Lenning protested the award because—by her reading of a story in Jennings' book One Teacher in 10—she thought he broke Massachusetts law in 1988 by not reporting a sixteen-year-old gay high school student's relationship with an older man. Three days later, the caucus ousted Lenning as chairwoman over her stance against gays, and later that month The Washington Times published a letter from Jennings saying the accusations were hurtful, inaccurate and potentially libelous. CNN subsequently confirmed that the student was above the age of consent in Massachusetts and not sexually active. The incident resurfaced in 2009 as part of a social conservatives' campaign against Jennings' appointment to head the U.S. Department of Education's Office of Safe and Drug-Free Schools, as well as a conference sponsored by GLSEN with the Massachusetts Department of Education in 2000 where instructors were fired for promoting the practice of fisting to underage youth.

In 2008, Jennings, a life-long ice hockey enthusiast, spoke out against the practice of homophobic chants from fans at New York Rangers home games, and stopped his practice of regularly attending their games for about a month. Jennings and the director of the Gay Hockey Association met with officials of the Rangers and Madison Square Garden but failed to get much action from them. Jennings was a founding member of the advisory board for You Can Play, a campaign dedicated to fighting homophobia in sports.

Jennings stepped down as head of GLSEN as of August 2008. By then, GLSEN had two regional offices and a staff of 40, and there were gay-straight alliances in over 3,700 schools registered to GLSEN.

== Office of Safe and Drug-Free Schools ==
On May 19, 2009, Obama administration Secretary of Education Arne Duncan announced Jennings' appointment as an Assistant Deputy Secretary for the Office of Safe and Drug-Free Schools, starting July 6, 2009 as the third director of the office, which was established in 2002 during the George W. Bush administration pursuant to the Safe and Drug-Free Schools and Communities Act part of the No Child Left Behind Act of 2001.

Social conservatives campaigned against Jennings' appointment because they alleged he condoned child molestation based on the 2004 incident over a teen's story he related in his book One teacher in 10 : LGBT educators share their stories. The allegations were proven to be false when it was shown the student was above the age of consent and no sex had occurred. 53 Republican members of the House of Representatives signed a letter to the Obama administration that called for Jennings' dismissal. Education Secretary Duncan, the White House, the NEA, and the National Association of Secondary School Principals have supported Jennings' appointment, with Duncan saying Jennings was "uniquely qualified for his job."

As Assistant Deputy Secretary, Jennings focused on matters relating to student safety, classroom discipline and bullying. His office has awarded safety grants worth millions of dollars. Jennings specifically led the development of the Safe and Supportive Schools program, which utilized student survey data to analyze school safety and direct grants to those schools identified by students as facing the biggest challenges. In August 2010 his office hosted the first-ever National Bullying Summit, which he and his Research and Policy Coordinator for Bullying Prevention Initiatives, Deborah Temkin, organized. In September 2010 Jennings became one of the notable members of the National Action Alliance for Suicide Prevention (NAASP), a public–private partnership designed to advance and update the 2001 National Strategy for Suicide Prevention and an outgrowth of the Suicide Prevention Resource Center. The NAASP will initially focus on three high-risk populations: LGBT youth; American Indians/Alaska Natives; and military/veterans.

On May 19, 2011, the Boston-based nonprofit organization Be the Change, based in Cambridge, Massachusetts, announced that Jennings would be resigning his position with the Obama administration and on July 25 he would become president and chief executive officer of the organization. Jennings was praised for his perseverance and effectiveness in the face of early criticism.

== Current work ==
Lambda Legal's board of directors announced it has named Kevin Jennings as the organization's new CEO, following a five-year stint as executive director of the Arcus Foundation, a philanthropic foundation advancing social justice and conservation issues, which he joined after leading Be the Change for a year and helping launch its Opportunity Nation campaign. From 2008 to 2013, Jennings served as board chair for the Tectonic Theater Project, creators of The Laramie Project. Jennings also served on the board of the Harvard Alumni Association from 2008 to 2014, becoming only its second openly gay elected director in 2008. He founded First Generation Harvard Alumni, an alumni association of graduates who were the first in their families to attend college which offers mentorship and other support and advocacy services for current first-generation students at Harvard. From 2009 to 2015, Jennings served on the board of Union Theological Seminary, where he chaired the Development Committee and served on the executive committee. Since 2015, he has been the founding board chair for the Ubunye Challenge, which uses extreme athletic events to raise funds to build schools in southern Africa.

== Honors and awards ==
Jennings received the Distinguished Service to American Education Award of the National Association of Secondary School Principals in 2007. He also received the Diversity Leadership Award of the National Association of Independent Schools in 2008. In 2010 Jennings was elected by his classmates to be Chief Marshal of the 2010 Harvard Commencement. Jennings also was honored by another of his alma maters, Columbia University's Teachers College, with its Distinguished Alumni Award in 2012. Maintaining his family's historic ties to Appalachia, Jennings served from 2004 to 2009 as national fundraising chair for the Appalachian Community Fund, which honored him with its Appalachian Hero Award in 2012.

== Written works ==
- Jennings, Kevin, ed. (1994). Becoming visible : a reader in gay & lesbian history for high school & college students. Boston: Alyson Publications. ISBN 1-55583-254-7.
- Jennings, Kevin, ed. (1994). One teacher in 10 : gay and lesbian educators tell their stories (1st ed.). Boston: Alyson Publications. ISBN 1-55583-263-6.
- Jennings, Kevin, ed. (1998). Telling tales out of school : gays, lesbians, and bisexuals revisit their school days. Los Angeles: Alyson Books. ISBN 1-55583-418-3.
- Jennings, Kevin; Shapiro, Patricia Gottlieb (2003). Always my child : a parent's guide to understanding your gay, lesbian, bisexual, transgendered, or questioning son or daughter. New York: Simon & Schuster. ISBN 0-7432-2649-6.
- Jennings, Kevin, ed. (2005). One teacher in 10 : LGBT educators share their stories (2nd ed.). Los Angeles: Alyson Books. ISBN 1-55583-869-3.
- Jennings, Kevin (2006). Mama's boy, preacher's son : a memoir. Boston: Beacon Press. ISBN 0-8070-7146-3.
- Jennings, Kevin (2015). One Teacher in Ten in the New Millennium. Boston: Beacon Press. ISBN 978-080705586-1.

== Personal life ==
Jennings is a lifelong, avid ice hockey fan. He has played in the New York City Gay Hockey Association. In 2005, he suffered a near-fatal heart attack after a game, but he recovered and returned to the ice in 2007.
