= Dignity for All Students Act =

New York State Legislature
- Full name: An act to amend the education law, in relation to enacting the dignity for all students act
- Assembly voted: April 7, 2009
- Senate voted: June 22, 2010
- Signed into law: September 13, 2010
- Sponsor: Daniel O'Donnell
- Governor: David Paterson
- Code: Education Law
- Resolution: A 3661
- Website: Text of the bill

Status: Current legislation

New York State's Dignity for All Students Act, also known as The Dignity Act, and most commonly referred to by its acronym, DASA, is legislation in the U.S. state of New York, established to provide a school environment free of discrimination and harassment. It was signed into law by former Governor David Paterson on September 13, 2010, but was not implemented in school districts statewide until July 1, 2012. This act was first introduced to the New York State Senate in 1999 by Senator Thomas Duane. "The Act to support student’s mental health at school and during school related events. It enforces a strict zero-tolerance policy for student discrimination, harassment, intimidation, taunting and bullying.

== Legislation ==
"The Dignity Act (Education Law §11[7]) defines "harassment" in terms of creating a hostile environment that unreasonably sustainably interferes with a student's educational performance, opportunities or benefits, or mental, emotional or physical well-being or conduct, verbal threats, intimidation or abuse that reasonably causes or would reasonably be expected to cause a student to fear for his or her physical safety." This act holds students liable for making comments, either in person, on paper or through the internet on a student’s race, color, weight, ethnicity, religion, religious practices, disabilities, sexual orientation, gender or sex. The most important factor when deliberating if an act is harassment is a student’s intent. The Dignity Act states bullying is the intent to cause another individual pain and/or misery. This act establishes a precedent to follow throughout elementary and secondary schools in New York State and provides a response for the "...large number of harassed and stigmatized students from skipping school and engaging in high risk behavior." In order to have a standardized response from all schools, The Dignity Act outlines the proper protocol to follow.

== School guidelines ==
The laws enforced by The Dignity for All Students Act ordered school districts to "revise their codes of conduct and adopt policies intended to create a school environment free from harassment and discrimination." All schools must partake in a professional training seminar on these issues in order to implement an effective harassment, bullying and discrimination prevention and intervention program. Additionally, one employee must be trained in "non-discriminatory instructional and counseling methods and handling human relations." This act mandates that each individual account of bullying must be documented by the school district and an annual report titled, "Reports of Incidents Concerning School Safety and the Educational Climate" must be submitted. There are two parts to this report, the first pertaining to violent altercations and the second documenting individuals who violate the Dignity Act. These reports are due to the New York State Education Department (NYSED) at the end of school term.

== Teacher’s responsibilities ==
According to NYSED, it is the teacher's responsibility to create a rich learning environment that is engaging and safe. This notion entails forming relationships with their students, making sure they are emotionally and physically looked after and that their environment is structuralized. Under DASA faculty must take collective actions enforcing the "School Climate Improvement Process." This process requires preparation, evaluation, action, implementation and re-evaluation. Teachers work together to acknowledge what is wrong with their school's climate, prioritize these concerns, enforce new policies and reevaluate this process as often as possible. NYSED states, "Social and emotional learning helps students develop fundamental and effective life skills, including: recognizing and managing emotions; developing caring and concern for others; establishing positive relationships; making responsible decisions; and handling challenging situations constructively and ethically." A school's climate is one of the determining factors regarding the amount of bullying incidents are reported.

== Student's responsibilities ==
NYSED explains that intention of the Dignity Act is not to enforce excess punishment throughout public schools, nor is punishment productive in stopping harassment and bullying. "Rather it is recommended that strategies such as prevention, intervention, and graduated/progressive discipline be considered in addressing and correcting inappropriate behavior, while re-enforcing pro-social values among student." By working with students on the issues of bullying and harassment, student to student engagement occurs and this results in progression. DASA positions "Student engagement is absolutely essential in creating a positive school culture and climate that effectively fosters student academic achievement and social/emotional growth. The quality of student life and the level of student engagement may be the best single indicator of potential or current school safety and security concerns as they pertain to student behavior." DASA aims to increase social connections between students in order to maintain a safe learning environment for all. This results in students bullying less, the ability to identify individual students who are being bullied, and an instilled responsibility to inform the necessary authorities when a peer is being teased. The Dignity Act explains, "Whether himself / herself or they have witnessed another student being bullied, s/he needs to feel empowered, comfortable, and safe reporting such an incident to school faculty/ staff." Specifically, the Dignity Act requires that boards of education create policies, procedures and guidelines that enable students and parents to make oral and/or written reports of harassment, bullying or discrimination to teachers, administrators, and other school personnel that the school district deems appropriate.

== Amendments ==
"On June 18, 2012, the New York State Senate and Assembly passed Governor Cuomo’s Program Bill #43 to amend the education law in relation to prohibiting bullying and cyber-bullying in public schools." This amendment proposed guidelines to enact the 2013–2014 school year in New York State providing "guidance and educational materials… regarding the best practices in addressing cyber bullying and helping families and communities work cooperatively with schools in addressing cyber-bullying, whether on or off school property or at or away from a school function." Under this new law, schools will play an important role - working with families, communities and law enforcement to protect a student's right to focus and learn in a stress free environment. Additionally, in July 2015, the New York State Education Department stated that under Title IX, "discrimination based on a person’s gender identity, a person’s transgender status, or a person’s nonconformity to sex stereotypes constitutes discrimination based on sex" and asserted a significant interest in ensuring that all students, including transgender students, have the opportunity to learn in an environment free of sex discrimination in public schools."

== Reports and investigation ==
The protocol that DASA outlines when a student is subjected to any form of harassment, is that first an oral report is required to be submitted to the principal of the school, and the superintendent of the district within one day of the incident. A written report is required to be submitted two days after the incident and a conclusion must be reached by the end of a 2 week period after the alleged incident. Complaints and issues regarding the alleged offender and targeted student should be investigated and tracked while an ongoing investigation occurs. The results of the investigation must be documented and presented to both parties. However, "The Dignity Act is silent regarding obligations to report incidents to parents." Based on each investigation singularly, a student's circumstances must be taken into account along with their safety. There are some instances where it is in the student's best interest, and safety for school districts to avoid disclosing information to their guardian. For example, "The school district may seek counsel from the school attorney to determine the best course of action. In some cases, such as where a student is being targeted with anti-gay language, if there is reason to fear that that student may face negative consequences by notifying his/her persons in parental relation, regardless of how she/he actually identifies, this should be taken into account."
