= International Survivors of Suicide Loss Day =

Day to support people with family who died to suites

- Also called: Survivor Day
- Observed by: United States, worldwide
- Date: Saturday before American Thanksgiving
- 2025 date: November 22
- Frequency: Annual

International Survivors of Suicide Loss Day is designated by the United States Congress as a day when the friends and family of those who have died by suicide can join together for healing and support. This day always falls on the Saturday before American Thanksgiving.

In 1999, Senator Harry Reid introduced a resolution to the United States Senate which led to the creation of National Survivors of Suicide Day. Reid is a survivor of his father's suicide.

Every year, the American Foundation for Suicide Prevention sponsors International Survivors of Suicide Loss Day, a program that unites survivors of suicide loss across the world. These events help survivors cope with the tragedy of losing someone to suicide.
