= American Foundation for Suicide Prevention =

Non-profit organization in the USA

- Abbreviation: AFSP
- Formation: 1987; 39 years ago
- Type: 501(c)(3)
- Headquarters: New York, New York, U.S.
- Revenue: 44,650,754 USD (2024)
- Expenses: 48,922,400 USD (2024)
- Endowment: 70,226,027 USD (2024)
- Website: afsp.org

The American Foundation for Suicide Prevention (AFSP) is a voluntary health organization that advocates for research and education around suicide, based in New York City, with a public policy office based in Washington, D.C. The organization's stated mission is to "save lives and bring hope to those affected by suicide."

In April 2026, it was announced that AFSP plans to merge with The Jed Foundation to further expand upon the goal of suicide prevention.

== History ==
The organization was founded in 1987.

According to a Charity Navigator rating published in 2023, more than 81% of the organization's finances went towards program expenses (based on financial data from fiscal year 2022), which, according to Charity Navigator, received a "perfect rating for accountability and transparency." AFSP also partners with Aetna.

For 2018, AFSP received $37 million in financial contributions from 700,000 new and returning donors.

== Programs ==
Through an alliance with OSHA, AFSP "provides local [workplace] communities with support services for survivors of suicide loss."

Programs designed to educate the larger public about suicide and prevention best practices, such as Talk Saves Lives: An Introduction to Suicide Prevention, are offered by AFSP under the umbrella of prevention education and provide a general understanding of suicide, including its scope and what can be done to prevent it.

International Survivors of Suicide Loss Day (also known as "Survivor Day") is an event occasionally co-sponsored by AFSP. Originally introduced as "National Survivors of Suicide Loss Day" in 1999, when United States Sen. Harry Reid—himself a survivor of suicide loss—formally introduced a resolution to the Senate, the day is officially observed annually on the Saturday before American Thanksgiving.

The Interactive Screening Program, or ISP, is an online tool offered by AFSP first piloted at Emory University, and has since been implemented in colleges, police departments, workplaces and the NFL Players Union.

AFSP also hosts walks called "Out of Darkness" to raise awareness and support individuals.

== Criticism ==
In August 2016, AFSP formed a partnership with the National Shooting Sports Foundation, a gun industry trade association. In December 2017, The New York Times released an opinion piece written by Erin Dunkerly, a volunteer whose father died by suicide using a firearm. The piece cites that there is a high risk of suicide from keeping firearms in the home, but claims that local AFSP staff told volunteers not to discuss the topic of gun control. The piece goes on to say that AFSP excluded from its walks violence prevention groups that promoted gun control, and that AFSP excludes the Brady Campaign to Prevent Gun Violence from donating or participating. According to a post published on digital health community The Mighty, similar accounts of gun safety groups have been reported in Wisconsin by Khary Penebaker, in San Diego by Wendy Wheatcroft, and in Maine by Judi Richardson.

Reportedly, an internal AFSP memo from September 2016 instructed chapters to “be cautious when partnerships, conferences and events include language like ‘gun safety’ and/or ‘gun violence’ — since these terms are also being used by gun control organizations” and that “If AFSP is approached to speak at a conference or event where the agenda is not clear and the firearms community is not involved, please decline participation”. In May 2023, an email said that the project was "being eliminated" short of the 2025 end date.
