= Office of Safe and Healthy Students =

The Office of Safe and Healthy Students (OSHS) (formerly Office of Safe and Drug-Free Schools (OSDFS) is a subdivision within the United States Department of Education that is responsible for assisting drug and violence prevention activities within the nation's schools.

The office was established by the Department of Education in 2002, pursuant to the Safe and Drug-Free Schools and Communities Act part of the No Child Left Behind Act of 2001.

== Responsibilities ==
The Office of Safe and Healthy Students administers, coordinates, and recommends policy for improving the quality of programs and activities designed to:

- Provide financial assistance for drug and violence prevention activities and activities that promote the health and well-being of students in elementary and secondary schools, and institutions of higher education. These activities may be carried out by State and local educational agencies and by other public and private nonprofit organizations.
- Participate in the formulation and development of Department of Education program policy and legislative proposals, and in overall Administration policies related to violence and drug prevention.
- Participate in interagency committees, groups, and partnerships related to drug and violence prevention, coordinating with other federal agencies on issues related to comprehensive school health, and advising the Secretary of Education on the formulation of comprehensive school health education policy.
- Participate with other federal agencies in the development of a national research agenda for drug and violence prevention.
- Administer the department's programs relating to character and civics education.

== Organization ==
The Office of Safe and Healthy Students was under the supervision of the Assistant Deputy Secretary, who reports to the Secretary and the Deputy Secretary on policy and program administration matters. As of August 2011, OSDFS moved under the Office of Elementary and Secondary Education. The Immediate Office of the Assistant Deputy Secretary provides overall direction, coordination, and leadership to the following major elements:

- Health, Mental Health, Environmental Health, and Physical Education
- Drug-Violence Prevention - State Programs (eliminated in 2010)
- Drug-Violence Prevention - National Programs
- Character and Civic Education
- Policy and Cross-Cutting Programs

== Directors ==
Bush administration Secretary of Education Rod Paige appointed the first two directors [title is officially Assistant Deputy Secretary] of the Office of Safe and Drug Free Schools, Eric G. Andell (2002–2003) and Deborah A. Price (2004–2009).

Obama administration Secretary of Education Arne Duncan appointed Assistant Deputy Secretary Kevin Jennings in May 2009.

== SDFSC Advisory Committee ==
The Safe and Drug-Free Schools and Communities Advisory Committee, authorized by the No Child Left Behind Act, was appointed by the U.S. Secretary of Education Margaret Spellings. The committee was established to provide advice to the Secretary on Federal, state, and local programs designated to create safe and drug-free schools, and on issues related to crisis planning. As outlined in section 4123(a), the committee will consult with, and provide advice to, the Secretary for the programs listed in section 4123(b) that are already carried out by the Office of Safe and Drug-Free Schools.
