= Glisten =

American nonprofit organization

- Founded: 1990
- Founder: Kevin Jennings
- Type: LGBTQ Youth Awareness Campaign & Education Organization
- Tax ID no.: 04-3234202
- Legal status: 501(c)(3) nonprofit organization
- Headquarters: New York City, U.S.
- Coordinates: 40.75007°N 73.98144°W
- Region served: United States
- Executive Director: Melanie Willingham-Jaggers
- Website: glisten.org
- Formerly called: GLSEN

Glisten (until February 2026 GLSEN; originally, Gay, Lesbian & Straight Education Network) is an American education organization working to end discrimination, harassment, and bullying based on sexual orientation, gender identity and gender expression and to prompt LGBTQ cultural inclusion and awareness in K-12 schools. Founded in 1990 in Boston, Massachusetts, the organization is now headquartered in New York City and has an office of public policy based in Washington, D.C.

As of 2026, there are 15 Glisten chapters across 13 states that train about 1,000 students, educators, and school personnel each year.The chapters also support more than 4,000 registered school-based clubs—commonly known as gay–straight alliances (GSAs)—which work to address name-calling, bullying, and harassment in their schools. Glisten also sponsors and participates in a host of annual "Days of Action", including a No Name-Calling Week every January, a Day of Silence every April, and an Ally Week every September. Guided by research such as its National School Climate Survey, GLSEN has developed resources, lesson plans, classroom materials, and professional development programs for teachers on how to support LGBTQ students.

Research shows that in response to bullying and mistreatment, many LGBTQ students avoid school altogether; this can lead to academic failure. To combat this problem, Glisten has advocated for LGBTQ-inclusive anti-bullying laws and policies. Glisten has also worked with the U.S. Departments of Education, Justice, and Health and Human Services to create model policies that support LGBTQ students and educators. Glisten has considered their signature legislation to be the Safe Schools Improvement Act and has been honored by the White House as a "Champion of Change".

== History ==
=== 1990s ===
==== 1990 ====
Logo until February 2026

- Kevin Jennings, a high school history teacher in Massachusetts, Kathy Henderson, Assistant Athletic Director at Phillips Academy in Andover, and Bob Parlin, a high school history teacher at Newton South High School lead a coalition of gay and lesbian educators to form what was then called the Gay and Lesbian Independent School Teacher Network (GLISTN).

==== 1993 ====
- In Massachusetts, the Governor's Commission released its report, Making Schools Safe for Gay and Lesbian Youth.

==== 1994 ====
- GLSTN became a national organization with the founding of the first chapter outside Massachusetts in St. Louis.
- GLSTN launches the first LGBT History Month in October with official proclamations from the governors of Connecticut and Massachusetts.

==== 1995 ====
- GLSTN hired its first full-time staffer, founder and Executive Director Kevin Jennings.
- GLSTN accredits chapters for the first time.

==== 1996 ====
- GLSTN started annual celebration of Day of Silence at the University of Virginia.

==== 1997 ====
- GLSTN staged its first national conference in Salt Lake City, Utah, in response to the legislature's effort to prevent the formation of GSAs in the state by banning all student groups.
- GLSTN changed its name to GLSEN (the Gay, Lesbian & Straight Education Network) in order to more accurately reflect the importance of straight educators in shaping safe schools.
- Kevin Jennings meets with President Bill Clinton at the White House to discuss anti-LGBT bias in America's schools—the first meeting of its kind in the Executive Office of the United States.

==== 1998 ====
- Out of the Past, a GLSEN-sponsored documentary developed as a resource for high school history classes, wins the Audience Award at the Sundance Film Festival and is broadcast nationally on PBS. Eliza Byard, the film's co-producer, would become GLSEN's Deputy Executive Director in 2001.

==== 1999 ====
- GLSEN conducts the National School Climate Survey—the first and only national study regularly documenting the experiences of LGBT youth in schools. The survey is conducted and published biennially.
- GLSEN, the American Academy of Pediatrics, and a coalition of national education, mental health, and religious organizations release Just the Facts about Sexual Orientation and Youth: A Primer for Principals, Educators and School Personnel, which provides authoritative statements about how "conversion therapy" is harmful to youth. Sixteen years later, President Barack Obama would call for an end to the practice.

=== 2000s ===
==== 2000 ====
- The Chicago chapter of GLSEN was inducted into the Chicago Gay and Lesbian Hall of Fame.

==== 2001 ====
- Students ask GLSEN to become the first national sponsor of the Day of Silence. Participation grows from hundreds of college students to thousands of middle and high school youth.

==== 2002 ====
- GLSEN begins a partnership with the National Education Association, which asks school districts to protect LGBTQ students and staff by adopting policies that protect students from bullying and harassment on the basis of sexual orientation and gender identity/expression.

==== 2003 ====
- U.S. Representative Linda Sánchez introduces the Safe Schools Improvement Act, an LGBT-inclusive federal anti-bullying bill that includes protections for sexual orientation and gender identity/expression.

==== 2004 ====
- GLSEN's No Name-Calling Week launches as an annual week of educational activities aimed at ending name-calling of all kinds.
- Vermont becomes the first state to pass an LGBT-inclusive anti-bullying law that includes protections on the basis of sexual orientation and gender identity/expression.

==== 2005 ====
- GLSEN and Harris Interactive release From Teasing to Torment: School Climate in America, A Survey of Students and Teachers, the first national study of the general population of secondary students and teachers to address LGBT issues. This study documents disparities between LGBTQ and non-LGBTQ students and finds that LGBT students were more than three times as likely to not feel safe at school.
- GLSEN's Jump-Start National Student Leadership Team develops an idea that turns into the first Ally Week that is now in schools nationwide every October.

==== 2006 ====
- GLSEN launches the "Think Before You Speak" public service announcement initiative with the Ad Council, the nonprofit advertising company's first LGBT-focused campaign.

==== 2007 ====
- GLSEN helps develop the New York City Department of Education's "Respect for All" initiative.

==== 2008 ====
- Lawrence King is murdered by his eighth-grade classmate at E.O. Green Junior High in Oxnard, California. GLSEN's Day of Silence is held in Larry's honor as students from more than 8,000 schools participate.
- Lance Bass films a public service announcement in the GLSEN office that is viewed more than 300,000 times on YouTube.
- GLSEN releases, The Principal's Perspective: School Safety, Bullying and Harassment, a report conducted in collaboration with the National Association of Secondary School Principals.

==== 2009 ====
- Eleven-year-old Carl Joseph Walker-Hoover takes his life after enduring anti-gay bullying at school. His mother, Sirdeaner Walker, becomes a GLSEN spokesperson and later joins GLSEN's National Board of Directors.
- GLSEN releases Harsh Realities: The Experiences of Transgender Youth in Our Nation's Schools, the organization's first report that focuses specifically on the experiences of transgender students. The study finds that transgender youth face much higher levels of harassment and violence than LGB cisgender students, and as a result, miss more school, receive lower grades and feel more isolated from their school community.
- GLSEN releases Shared Differences: The Experiences of Lesbian, Gay, Bisexual and Transgender Students of Color in our Nation's Schools. The study focuses specifically on the school experiences of LGBTQ students of color and provides insight into the ways in which LGBTQ students' school experiences differ based on race or ethnicity. The report finds that the majority of LGBTQ students of color faced both LGBTQ-based harassment and race-based harassment at school.

=== 2010s ===
==== 2010 ====
- GLSEN officially launches the Safe Space Campaign, designed to give educators the tools to be visibly supportive allies to LGBTQ students. The campaign goes on to place a Safe Space Kit in every school in the United States.

==== 2011 ====
- GLSEN's Executive Director Eliza Byard participates in the first-ever United Nations international consultation to address anti-LGBT bullying in schools.
- Several representatives from GLSEN attend the White House Conference on Bullying Prevention, pressing for effective federal action to address bullying, and highlighting bullying prevention programs and approaches that benefit all students.
- The White House names GLSEN a "Champion of Change", honoring the organization's two decades of work to fight bullying, violence, and stigma directed at LGBTQ people in K-12 schools and for GLSEN's efforts to prevent suicide among at-risk youth.
- GLSEN, the Anti-Defamation League, and National Public Radio's StoryCorps launch "Unheard Voices", an oral history and curriculum project that will help educators integrate LGBTQ history, people and issues into their instructional programs.

==== 2012 ====
- GLSEN releases Strengths and Silences: The Experiences of Lesbian, Gay, Bisexual and Transgender Students in Rural and Small Town Schools. The report documents the experiences of more than 2,300 LGBTQ students who attend secondary schools in rural areas. Findings demonstrate that compared to LGBTQ students in urban and suburban areas, LGBTQ students in rural schools are more likely to hear negative comments about gender expression and sexual orientation; feel unsafe at their schools due to their sexual orientation, gender identity, or gender expression, and experience verbal and physical harassment and assault due to these characteristics.
- A GuideStar/Philanthropedia survey of 110 experts on LGBTQ issues names GLSEN one of the country's top three LGBTQ nonprofits making significant contributions on a national level.
- GLSEN partners with the leading school mental health professional associations, the National Association of School Psychologists, the American School Counselors Association, the School Social Workers Association of America, and the American Council for School Social Workers, to conduct a national study of school mental health professionals on their preparation and practices related to LGBTQ youth in schools.

==== 2013 ====
- GLSEN convenes first-ever research symposia on LGBTQ students' experiences and homophobic and transphobic bullying internationally at the World Comparative Education Congress in Buenos Aires, Argentina – with more than 15 countries, including Australia, Brazil, Canada, Chile, China, Cyprus, Israel, Ireland, Italy, Mexico, the Netherlands, Nigeria, Poland, Slovenia, South Africa, and Turkey. GLSEN, in partnership with UNESCO, also coordinates an all-day strategic planning meeting with the global group of experts to coordinate collective resources and reduce homophobic and transphobic prejudice and violence in schools globally.
- GLSEN publishes Out Online: The Experiences of Lesbian, Gay, Bisexual and Transgender Youth, the first national report to examine the online experience of LGBTQ youth. While LGBTQ youth experience nearly three times as much bullying and harassment online, they also find greater peer support, access to health information, and opportunities to be civically engaged.
- Transgender Student Rights, a youth-created grassroots organization, becomes a GLSEN program.
- By youth nomination, GLSEN Executive Director Dr. Eliza Byard speaks at the Let Freedom Ring Commemoration and Call to Action event at the Lincoln Memorial, where Martin Luther King Jr. delivered his famous "I Have a Dream" speech in 1963. Fellow speakers include Presidents Obama, Bill Clinton, and Jimmy Carter. GLSEN is the only representative from an LGBTQ organization to speak at the event.

==== 2014 ====
- GLSEN partners with the American Association of Colleges for Teacher Education and the Association of Teacher Educators to research and support the inclusion of LGBTQ issues in teacher preparation.
- The Office for Civil Rights in the U.S. Department of Education issues official guidance making clear that transgender students are protected from discrimination under Title IX, stating that "Title IX's sex discrimination prohibition extends to claims of discrimination based on gender identity or failure to conform to stereotypical notions of masculinity or femininity."
- The GLSEN National School Climate Survey finds that school climate for LGBTQ students has improved somewhat over the years, yet remains quite hostile for many. LGBTQ students in the survey experienced lower verbal and physical harassment based on sexual orientation than in all prior years, and the lowest physical assault based on sexual orientation since 2007.
- The Safe Schools Improvement Act, federal legislation that would require schools to adopt LGBTQ-inclusive anti-bullying policies, garners its highest support yet, with 208 bipartisan co-sponsors in the U.S. House of Representatives and 46 in the U.S. Senate.

==== 2015 ====
- GLSEN's No Name-Calling Week generates nearly 1,000,000 impressions of #celebratekindness on Twitter.
- GLSEN and Chilean partner organization Todo Mejora release a Spanish-language version of the GLSEN Safe Space Kit to be used in Chilean schools.

=== 2020s ===
==== 2022 ====
- GLSEN appoints Melanie Willingham-Jaggers as the organization's first Black and non-binary executive director.

==== 2023 ====
- Wilson Cruz becomes chair of the board, with Imara Jones as vice-chair.

==== 2025 ====
- With the support and guidance of Cause Capacity, GLSEN laid off 60% of its employees.

== Campaigns and programs ==
=== Day of Silence ===
Glisten's Day of Silence is a national day of action that began at the University of Virginia in 1996 in which students vow to take a form of silence to call attention to the silencing effect of anti-LGBTQ bullying and harassment in schools. Glisten's Day of Silence takes place in 8,000 U.S. schools every year and has spread to more than 60 countries.

=== No Name-Calling Week ===
Every January, thousands of elementary and middle schools participate in Glisten's No Name-Calling Week to end bullying. No Name-Calling Week was inspired by the popular young adult novel entitled The Misfits by popular author James Howe, and is supported by over 60 national partner organizations.

=== Ally Week ===
Every fall, Glisten's Ally Week serves to educate allies about the role they play in creating safer spaces for LGBTQ youth. Ally Week was started in 2005 by Glisten's Jump-Start National Student Leadership team. Ally Week is supported by over 20 endorsers.

=== Think Before You Speak campaign ===
On October 8, 2008, GLSEN and Ad Council released the Think Before You Speak campaign, designed to end homophobic vocabulary and raise awareness about the prevalence and consequences of anti-LGBTQ bias and behavior in America's schools among youth, through the use of television, radio, print, and outdoor ads. The campaign also aimed to raise awareness among adults, school personnel, and parents. It includes three television public service announcements (PSAs), six print PSAs and three radio PSAs. Television commercials for the campaign include singer Hilary Duff as well as comedian Wanda Sykes. In 2008 the campaign won the Ad Council's Gold Bell award for "Best Public Service Advertising Campaign".

=== Research ===
Glisten has been conducting research and evaluation on LGBTQ issues in K-12 education since 1999. Glisten became the only organization to regularly document the school experiences of lesbian, gay, bisexual, transgender, and queer (LGBTQ) middle and high school students in the U.S. using Glisten's National School Climate Survey. Other research reports GLSEN has put out include From Statehouse to Schoolhouse: Anti-Bullying Policies in U.S. States and School Districts, Shared Differences: The Experiences of LGBTQ Students of Color in Our Nation's Schools, Harsh Realities: The Experiences of Transgender Youth in Our Nation's Schools, as well as many other reports, articles, and book chapters.

=== National Student Council ===
The Glisten National Student Council, formerly known as the Student Ambassadors program, is one of Glisten's student leadership teams. Each year, Glisten selects a small group of middle and high school students to serve as Glisten youth representatives for the upcoming school year. Students of the National Student Council advise Glisten on campaigns, bring Glisten resources to their schools, represent Glisten in the media, and have their own work published in local and national outlets.

=== Chapters ===
Glisten Chapters, with the support and guidance of the national office, work to bring Glisten programs to their specific communities on a local level. Chapter board members and volunteers are students, educators, parents and community members who volunteer their time to support students and Gay-Straight Alliances, train educators and provide opportunities for everyone to make change in their local schools. Glisten has 15 volunteer-led Glisten Chapters in 13 states that work with student leaders, provide professional development for educators, and encourage policymakers to enact LGBTQ-inclusive policies.

== Respect Awards ==
Glisten organizes the annual Glisten Respect Awards to honor leaders, personalities, and organizations who have made significant contributions to LGBTQ youth. Awards are given to organizations, celebrities, students, educators and gay–straight alliances. Since 2004, there have been over four dozen honorees and over $15 million raised in all. The first Respect Awards were in New York in 2004 and honored Andrew Tobias, author and Treasurer of the Democratic National Committee; MTV; and student Marina Gatto. Since then, the Respect Awards are held annually in New York in late May and in Los Angeles in late October. Since 2004, there have been over four-dozen honorees and over $17 million raised.

Year	New York awards	Los Angeles awards
2018	Rosario Dawson	Ellen Pompeo, Inspiration Award
2018	Hollister, California	Yara Shahidi, Gamechanger Award
2018	David Henry Jacobs	Max Mutchnick & David Kohan, Champion Award
2018	Stephanie Byers	Twentieth Century Fox Films, Visionary Award
2018	E.O. Green Junior High School	Ruby Noboa, Student Advocate of the Year
2017	Ryan Pedlow	Kerry Washington, Inspiration Award
2017	Ann Clark	Bruce Bozzi, Champion Award
2017	First Data	Zendaya, Gamechanger Award
2017	Roland Park, GSA of the Year	DC Entertainment, Visionary Award
2017	Carla Gugino	Ose Arheghan, Student Advocate of the Year
2016	George Stephanopoulos & Alexandra Wentworth	Kate Hudson, Inspiration Award
2016	Ilene Chaiken	Connor Franta, Gamechanger Award
2016	Optimedia	Target, Champion Award
2016	Amber Schweitzer	Jess Cagle, Visionary Award
2016	Academy for Young Writers, GSA of the Year	Edward Estrada, Student Advocate of the Year
2015	Johnson & Johnson	YouTube
2015	Matthew Morrison	Justin Timberlake & Jessica Biel
2015	Jon Stryker	Zachary Quinto
2015	Desiree Raught, Educator of the Year	Mars Hallman, Student Advocate of the Year
2015	Nixa High School GSA, GSA of the Year	
2014	AT&T	Danny Moder & Julia Roberts
2014	Janet Mock	Bob Greenblatt
2014	Laura Taylor, Educator of the Year	Derek Hough
2014	The Park City High School GSA, GSA of the Year	Cliff Tang, Student Advocate of the Year
2013	Jason Collins	Lionsgate
2013	JPMorgan Chase & Co.	Todd Spiewak & Jim Parsons
2013	LZ Granderson	Linda Bloodwort-Thomason
2013	Farrington High School, GSA of the Year	Laila Al-Shamma, Student Advocate of the Year
2013	Matthew Beck, Educator of the Year	
2013	USA Network's Characters Unite campaign	
2012	NBA	Marilyn & Jeffrey Katzenberg
2012	Marguerite Kondracke	Simon Halls & Matt Bomer
2012	Janet Sammons, Educator of the Year	Bob and Harvey Weinstein
2012	Allies 4 Equality, GSA of the Year	Luis Veloz, Student Advocate of the Year
2011	Barclays Capital	Wells Fargo
2011	Susie Scher & Allison Grover	Chaz Bono
2011	Chely Wright	Michele & Rob Reiner
2011	Rich Espey, Educator of the Year	Rick Welts
2011		Emmett Patterson, Student Advocate of the Year
2010	American Express	Modern Family
2010	Pfizer	Out & Equal Workplace Advocates
2010	David Dechman & Michael Mercure	Dan Renberg and Eugene Kapaloski
2010	Cyndi Lauper	Ferial Pearson, Educator of the Year
2010	Danielle Smith, Student Advocate of the Year	
2009	KPMG	HBO
2009	PepsiCo	David C. Bohnett
2009	Mary Jane Karger, Educator of the Year	Shonda Rhimes
2009		Austin Laufersweiler, Student Advocate of the Year
2008	DiversityInc	Lance Bass
2008	Goldman Sachs	Darren Star
2008	Lloyd C. Blankfein	Disney / ABC Television Group
2008	Ronald M. Ansin	
2007	National Education Association	Hon. James C. Hormel
2007	Elizabeth Duthinh	Greg Berlanti
2007	John Mack	Dr. Neal Baer
2007		Hon. Sheila Kuehl
2006	Citigroup, Inc.	James Howe
2006	Kerry Pacer, Student Activist	Cisco
2006	The 25th Annual Putnam County Spelling	Dr Virginia Uribe, Ph.D.
2005	Lehman Brothers	Jeffrey C. Quinn
2005	Talia Stein	Moses Kaufman
2005	Hon. Richard Gephardt & Chrissy Gephardt	IBM
2005		Frankie Martinez
2004	Andrew Tobias	
2004	Marina Gatto	
2004	MTV	

== Fistgate controversy ==
In 2000, the leader of the conservative Parents' Rights Coalition of Massachusetts (now known as MassResistance) secretly taped one of the 50 workshops in "Teachout 2000", titled "What They Didn't Tell You About Queer Sex and Sexuality in Health Class: Workshop for Youth Only, Ages 14–21". Students discussed sex in a workshop "billed as a safe place for youths to get their questions about their sexuality answered" in the session's Q&A section. A question was asked about fisting a minor and an explanation was provided. Greg Carmack subsequently suggested that the question might have been planted by those making the recordings. MassResistance dubbed the incident "Fistgate" and the tapes generated controversy when they were broadcast over radio. A state employee who participated in the discussion and was subsequently dismissed filed suit against Camenker and Scott Whiteman as a result of the distribution of the tape recordings, while others pointed out the legal prohibition against recording people without their knowledge or permission. According to Bay Windows, a "Massachusetts Superior Court judge ruled that the tape was illegally acquired and therefore an invasion of privacy against those individuals present, who were never told they were being recorded."

== See also ==
- LGBTQ rights in the United States
- List of LGBTQ rights organizations
