= Day of Silence =

International day to spread awareness of LGBT people

- GLSEN logo
- Observed by: LGBTQ+ communities
- Type: National, International
- Observances: Vow of silence
- Date: Second Friday of April
- Frequency: Annual
- Related to: 1987 March on Washington

Day of Silence is an annual day of action organized by GLSEN (Gay, Lesbian & Straight Education Network) to spread awareness about the effects of the bullying and harassment of lesbian, gay, bisexual, transgender, queer, and questioning (LGBTQ) students. In the United States, students take a day-long vow of silence to symbolically represent the silencing of LGBTQ students.

The Day of Silence has been held each year in April since 1996. Since 2011, the event has been held on the second Friday of April, except in 2018, when it was observed on Friday, April 27, 2020, when it was observed on Friday, April 24, 2021, when it was observed on Friday, April 23, and 2022, when it was observed on Friday, April 22.

== Organization ==
The Day of Silence is organized by GLSEN. Students are encouraged to obtain permission from their school before organizing the event.

GLSEN states that hundreds of thousands of students at more than 8,000 schools participated in the 2008 Day of Silence.

== History ==
Created by then-students Maria Pulzetti and Jessie Gilliam, the first event was organized by students at University of Virginia in 1996. Pulzetti explained: "I wanted to do something for BGLAD week that would impact many people at the school and that would be very visible...I knew that if we held panel discussions and events like that, the only people who would come would be the people who already were fairly aware."

In 1997, the Day of Silence went national, with almost 100 colleges and universities participating.

In 2002, Pulzetti's classmates Jessie Gilliam and Chloe Palenchar, and GLSEN National Student Organizer Chris Tuttle, developed the proposal for the day to become an official project of GLSEN. GLSEN developed its first-ever "student leadership team" as part of the Day of Silence.

In 2008, the Day of Silence was held in memory of Lawrence "Larry" King, an eighth grader from E.O. Green Middle School who was shot by classmate Brandon McInerney.

In the last several years, over 10,000 participants have registered their participation with GLSEN each year. These participants attend middle schools, high schools, colleges, and universities. They include students from all 50 states in the U.S.A. as well as students from around the world, including New Zealand, Singapore, and Russia.

In 2024, GLSEN’s Day of Silence was rebranded as the Day of (No) Silence, a day focused on taking action against laws that impact the rights and visibility of the LGBTQ+ community.

== Opposition ==
In 2005, the Alliance Defense Fund began sponsoring a yearly counter-protest called the Day of Truth. "Events like these actually end up promoting homosexuality in public schools, and that actually creates a hostile climate for students of faith," said Candi Cushman, an education analyst for Focus on the Family. A card carried by participants in the Day of Truth reads: "true tolerance means that people with differing—even opposing—viewpoints can freely exchange ideas and respectfully listen to each other. It's time for an honest conversation about homosexuality. There's freedom to change if you want to. Let's talk."

Other socially conservative organizations, including the American Family Association, Concerned Women for America, Mission America, Traditional Values Coalition, Americans for Truth, and Liberty Counsel, opposed the Day of Silence in 2008 by forming a coalition urging parents to keep their kids home on the DOS if students at their school were observing it. The Rev. Ken Hutcherson, the principal supporter of those who skipped school, said, "We want education, not indoctrination."

In April 2010, in opposition to the Day of Silence, several students in Laingsburg High School in Laingsburg, Michigan wore T-shirts stating "Straight Pride" on the front side and bore a reference to Leviticus 20:13 on the back. That Bible verse refers to homosexual behaviour as an abomination and prescribes death as the penalty for it. The same protest, which was organized on a Facebook group, also took place in the St. Johns and Bath school districts.

On October 6, 2010, CNN reported that Exodus International, which promotes "freedom from homosexuality through Jesus Christ,” would not support the 2011 annual Day of Truth as the organization had done in 2010. President Alan Chambers stated, "All the recent attention to bullying helped us realize that we need to equip kids to live out biblical tolerance and grace while treating their neighbors as they'd like to be treated, whether they agree with them or not."

In 2011, Focus on the Family acquired the “Day of Truth” event and renamed it into the “Day of Dialogue”. As of 2012, the Day of Dialogue website stated: "Now it boasts a new name, while maintaining the same goal it’s always had since its founding — encouraging honest and respectful conversation among students about God’s design for sexuality."

== See also ==
- Ally Week
- Athlete Ally
- National Coming Out Day
- Student voice
- Suicide among LGBT youth
- Transgender Day of Remembrance
- List of LGBT awareness days
