= Portland Street Response =

Portland Street Response is a community first-response agency of the Government of Portland, Oregon. The agency was originally developed from a working group organized by the Office of Mayor Ted Wheeler and Portland City Commissioner Jo Ann Hardesty. Prior to its establishment, with regard to the oversight and funding of local police departments, the Portland City Council reduced the police bureau's funding by $15 million in June 2020, reallocating some of that amount to the PSR team. On July 1, 2020, the city and the Portland Police Association renewed its annual contract, with an agreement to permit the formation of the Portland Street Response team, promoted by Hardesty, for emergency situations that don't require firearms, and an agreement on the delay of cost-of-living adjustment due to city budget issues related to COVID-19.

The pilot phase of the agency began in February 2021, and expanded citywide as of March 28, 2022. The agency is dispatched through the city’s independently run 911 call center, the Bureau of Emergency Communications, and is a division of Portland Fire & Rescue.

Since it began operations, PSR experienced funding issues. In March 2025, Mayor Keith Wilson announced changes expanding rules regulating interventions by PSR, allowing PSR personnel to shuttle people to homeless shelters and addiction treatment centers, respond to calls that occur inside commercial and government buildings, and be able to respond to emergencies in partnership with other first responders, like police officers and firefighters. This change was announced pending union approval.

== See also ==
- CAHOOTS
- Homeless street outreach
- Behavioral Crisis Response
- Mental health first aid
- Mobile Crisis
