= Suicide crisis =

Feelings of or ideation with suicide

A suicide crisis, suicidal crisis or potential suicide is a situation in which someone is attempting to kill themselves or is seriously contemplating or planning to do so. It is considered by public safety authorities, medical practice, and emergency services to be a medical emergency, requiring immediate suicide intervention and emergency medical treatment. Suicidal presentations occur when someone faces an emotional, physical, or social problem they feel they cannot overcome and considers suicide to be a solution. Clinicians usually attempt to re-frame suicidal crises, tell the patient that suicide is not a solution and help the individual identify and solve or tolerate the problems.

== Nature ==
Most cases of potential suicide have warning signs. Attempting to kill oneself, talking about or planning suicide, writing a suicide note, talking or thinking frequently about death, exhibiting a death wish by expressing it verbally or by taking potentially deadly risks, or taking steps towards attempting suicide (such as obtaining rope and tying it to a ligature point to attempt a hanging or stockpiling pills for an attempted overdose) are all indicators of a suicide crisis. More subtle clues include preparing for death for no apparent reason (such as putting affairs in order or changing a will), writing goodbye letters, and visiting or calling family members or friends to say farewell. The person may also start giving away previously valued items (because they "no longer need them"). In other cases, the person who seemed depressed and suicidal may become normal or filled with energy or calm again; these people particularly need to be watched because the return to normalcy could be because they have come to terms with whatever act is next (such as a plan to attempt suicide and escape from their problems).

Depression is a major causative factor of suicide, and individuals with depression are considered a high-risk group for suicidal behavior. However, suicidal behavior is not just restricted to patients diagnosed with some form of depression. More than 90% of all suicides are related to a mood disorder, such as bipolar disorder, depression, addiction, PTSD, or other psychiatric illnesses, such as schizophrenia. The deeper the depression, the greater the risk, often manifested in feelings or expressions of apathy, helplessness, hopelessness, or worthlessness.

Suicide is often attempted in response to a cause of depression, such as a divorce or end of a romantic relationship, serious illness or injury (like the loss of a limb or blindness), the death of a friend or family member, financial problems or poverty, guilt or fear of getting caught for something the person did, drug abuse, old age, concerns with gender identity, among others.

=== Treatments ===
Crisis hotlines, such as the Suicide and Crisis Lifeline, enable people to get immediate emergency telephone counselling

Ketamine has been tested for treatment-resistant bipolar depression, major depressive disorder, and people in a suicidal crisis in emergency rooms, and is being used this way off-label. The drug is given by a single intravenous infusion at doses less than those used in anesthesia, and preliminary data have indicated it produces a rapid (within 2 hours) and relatively sustained (about 1–2 weeks long) significant reduction in symptoms in some patients. Initial studies with ketamine have sparked scientific and clinical interest due to its rapid onset, and because it appears to work by blocking NMDA receptors for glutamate, a different mechanism from most modern antidepressants that operate on other targets. Some studies have shown that lithium medication can reduce suicidal ideation within 48 hours of administration.

=== Intervention ===
Intervention is important to stop someone in a suicidal crisis from harming or killing themselves. Every sign of suicide should be taken seriously. Some examples of steps taken to help defuse a situation or get a person in crisis to safety would include:

- Staying with the person so they are not alone.
- Calling 988 (if in the U.S.) or another suicide hotline, or taking the person to the nearest hospital facility.
- Reaching out to a family member or friend about what is going on.
- Removing harmful objects, such as guns and knives, from the home.
- Offering reassurance and support.

In many countries, police negotiators will be called to respond to situations where a person is at high risk of an immediate suicide crisis. However, offers of help are frequently rejected in these situations, because they have not been directly sought by the person in crisis, who wants to maintain a level of independence. Supporting those in crisis to make independent decisions, and adapting terminology, for example using the phrase "sort (x) out" can aid in minimizing resistance to the help being offered.

== See also ==
- Depression
- Major depressive disorder
- Mental health first aid
- Psychological first aid
- Suicide
- Suicidal ideation
- Suicide prevention
- Warning signs of suicide
