= Wellness check =

Wellbeing-related visit from law officers

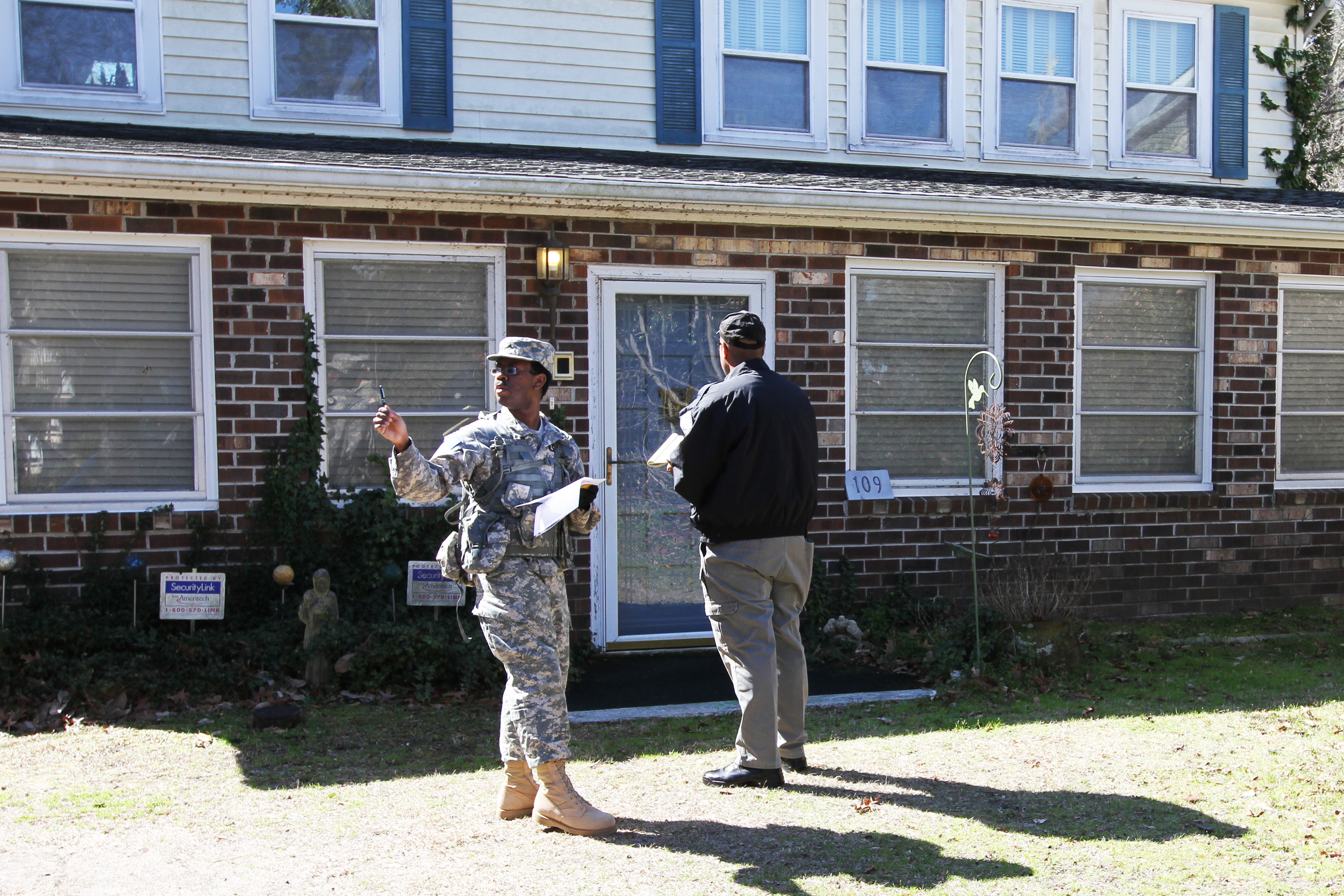
South Carolina National Guard conducting wellness checks on local citizens.

A wellness check (also known as a welfare check or a safe and well check) is a colloquial term for an in-person visit from one or more persons, usually by law enforcement or public safety officers, conducted in response to concerns raised about the person's wellbeing.

== Reasons for wellness checks ==
A wellness check may be conducted if a person's loved one has stopped responding, someone with suicidal tendencies has been acting suspiciously, or someone has deviated from regular plans in a concerning manner. For example, a family member may request that law enforcement perform a wellness check to confirm the safety of an elderly loved one, or may occur in response to reports from concerned bystanders of suspected domestic violence or substance abuse.

== By country ==
=== Canada ===
In Canada, in addition to feeding information back to the individual that requested the check, descriptions of what happened during these wellness checks as well as details of the surrounding area are listed on the Subject Behavior/ Officer Response (SB/OR) report. This report is often used for Canadian policy development.

In order to respond to wellness calls, officers have to be properly and extensively trained for any task that may occur during a wellness check. For example, they have to be fully aware of alarming health signs related to both physical and mental unwellness. This training ensures that all wellness check requests and operations are performed in a uniform way, as officers must always follow direct protocol. Extensive mental illness training is provided to officers online through a program called Crisis Intervention and De-escalation (CID) training. This training is mandatory for all officers.

=== United Kingdom ===
In the United Kingdom, following a request for a welfare check, police officers are required to establish the subject's location, to call for medical assessment where necessary, and to inform whoever requested the check of their findings. When undertaking such a check, police are lawfully permitted to search the subject's property if there is no response after knocking on their door.

=== United States ===
In the United States, if a law enforcement officer reasonably believes that someone inside a residence is in immediate danger or needs urgent assistance, and receives no response during a wellness check after knocking on the subject's door, they are lawfully able to enter the residence without a warrant.

According to a March 2024 study by the Johns Hopkins Bloomberg School of Public Health, "Calls to police to check on the well-being of individuals were 74% more likely to be associated with fatal injury than police responses to an incident where shots had already been fired. This includes wellness checks that did not explicitly involve threats or harm before an encounter with police."

== Notable occurrences ==
In 2018, American comedian Pete Davidson posted a message to his Instagram that led fans to be concerned for his mental well-being. The New York Police Department conducted a wellness check with Davidson.

Also in 2018, actress Vanessa Marquez was shot and killed by police in a wellness check requested by a neighbor; in a state of distress, she had advanced on them with a replica of a gun, begging them to kill her.

In October 2024, computer scientist Ward Christensen, inventor of the BBS, was found dead at home from a heart attack after his friends requested a wellness check.

In November 2024, police found 26-year-old OpenAI whistleblower Suchir Balaji dead in his apartment in San Francisco, California, United States when they arrived there to conduct a wellness check.

In February 2025, American actor Gene Hackman, his wife, Betsy Arakawa, and one of their three dogs were found dead of natural causes at their residence in Santa Fe, New Mexico, after a wellness check.

== See also ==
- House call, a visit by a doctor to the home of a patient
- Mental health first aid, training for nonspecialists to assist those experiencing a mental health condition
- Mobile Crisis, first responder service providing mental health evaluations, de-escalation, and referral to other services
- Police crisis intervention team, American movement of partnerships between law enforcement and mental health services
- Victimology
