= Critical incident stress debriefing =

Form of psychological debriefing

Critical incident stress debriefing (CISD) is a form of psychological debriefing that features a specific structure and format, which were developed to address critical incident stress experienced by emergency service workers. It was developed by Jeffrey Mitchell and is considered the most widely used today. Despite its frequent use, major organisations such as the World Health Organization, NICE and Phoenix Australia recommended against its use based on synthesis of available evidence – no high-quality evidence of helping alleviate symptoms of PTSD and some studies reporting on worsening the PTSD symptoms trajectory due to CISD. Psychological first aid was suggested by those organisations as an evidence-informed alternative instead.

== Components ==
CISD is a part of a larger Critical Incident Stress Management (CISM) framework. The CISM framework has three components: pre-incident functions, on-scene support services, and post-incident interventions. Pre-incident functions refers to the education and coping mechanisms taught to those who are more vulnerable to traumatization before they enter combat. On-scene support services entails brief discussions and unstructured therapy sessions that occur within a few hours of an incident that may cause high stress responses in soldiers. Finally, post-incident interventions occur usually at least 24 hours after an incident to give the soldiers a bit more time to deescalate from a having high stress response to that incident. One of the post-incident interventions suggested by CISM is CISD.

The CISD (as defined by the International Critical Incident Stress Foundation [ICISF]) has seven steps: introduction of intervenor and establishment of guidelines and invites participants to introduce themselves (while attendance at a debriefing may be mandatory, participation is not); details of the event given from individual perspectives; emotional responses given subjectively; personal reaction and actions; followed again by a discussion of symptoms exhibited since the event; instruction phase where the team discusses the symptoms and assures participants that any symptoms (if they have any at all) are a normal reaction to an abnormal event and "generally" these symptoms will diminish with time and self-care; following a brief period of shared informal discussion (generally over a beverage and treat) resumption of duty where individuals are returned to their normal tasks. The intervenor is always watching for individuals who are not coping well and additional assistance is offered at the conclusion of the process.

== Format and timing ==
ICISF specifies that CISD are only intended for use with groups. CISD is suggested to be administered 48–72 hours after a critical incident. CISM protocols clearly state that no one should ever be pressured or coerced to speak, contrary to some of the criticisms offered (e.g., one firefighter's account of CISM properly offered). Although many co-opted using CISD in other settings, it was originally developed by Mitchell for groups of firefighters and other first responders.

== Controversy regarding its evidence ==
Critical incident stress debriefing (CISD) is controversial, and research suggests it may cause harm. The International Critical Incident Stress Foundation rejects these claims, writing that "There is no extant evidence to argue that the “Mitchell model” CISD, or the CISM system, has proven harmful! The investigations that are frequently cited to suggest such an adverse effect simply did not use the CISD or CISM system as prescribed, a fact that is too often ignored". Despite a prior rebuttal of this claim by McNally and colleagues, ICISF has not retracted their claim.
