= Cahoots =

Cahoots and similar may refer to:

- Cahoots (album), the fourth LP by Canadian-American rock group The Band
- CAHOOTS (crisis response), a program that answers mental-health related 911 calls in Eugene, Oregon
- Cahoots, a 2001 movie directed by Dirk Benedict and starring David Keith

== See also ==
- Cahoot, an internet bank in the United Kingdom
- In Cahoots, a Canterbury scene band led by guitarist Phil Miller
- Kahoot!, a game-based learning platform
  - Kahoots (plural), user-generated multiple-choice quizzes used by Kahoot!
