= Anthony Jorm =

Australian researcher (born 1951)

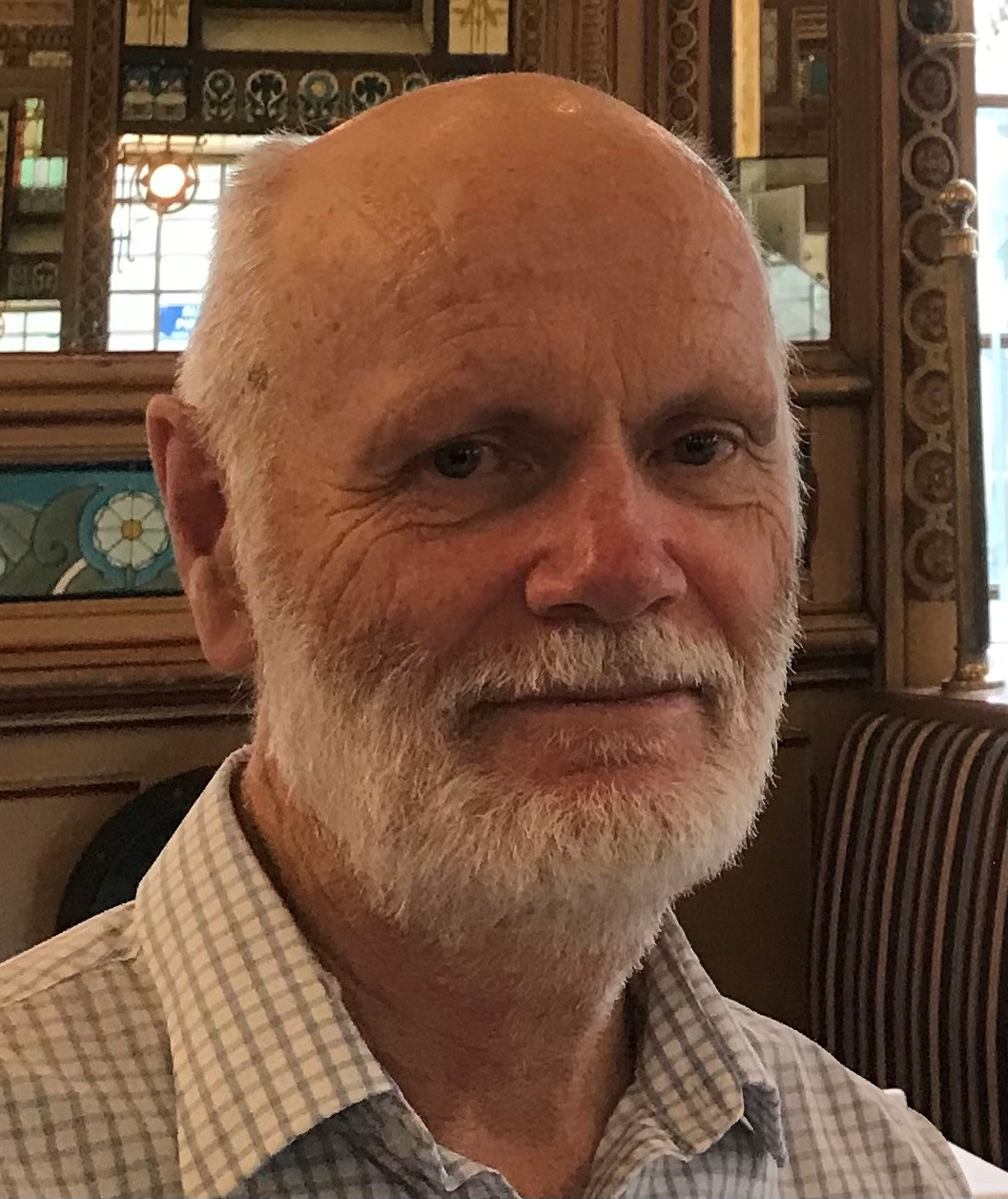
- Jorm in 2023
- Born: 1951 (age 74–75); Brisbane, Queensland, Australia
- Education: University of Queensland; University of New South Wales; Australian National University
- Known for: Mental health researcher; co-founder of Mental Health First Aid training
- Spouse: Betty Kitchener
- Children: Two
- Website: findanexpert.unimelb.edu.au/profile/60295-anthony-jorm

Anthony Jorm (born 1951) is an Australian researcher who has made contributions in the areas of psychology, psychiatry and gerontology. He also co-founded mental health first aid training with mental health educator Betty Kitchener.

== Career ==
Anthony Jorm received a BA from the University of Queensland, achieving First Class Honours in psychology and a University Medal in 1973. He then completed a master's degree in clinical psychology (1975) and a PhD in psychology (1977) at the University of New South Wales. In 1995, he was awarded a DSc by the Australian National University for his research on mental disorders. He has held academic appointments at Deakin University (1977–1984), the Australian National University (1984–2005), including Director of the Centre for Mental Health Research (2001–2004), and the University of Melbourne (2005–2018). Since 2019, he has been a professor emeritus at the University of Melbourne. Jorm has held National Health and Medical Research Council (NHMRC) Fellowships, including being awarded an Australia Fellowship in 2009.

Honorary positions include president of the Australasian Society for Psychiatric Research (1999–2000), chair of the Board of Mental Health First Aid International, and chair of the Australian Rotary Health Research Committee (2009–2012).

== Contributions to research ==
Jorm's early research at Deakin University was on cognitive processes in reading and spelling, particularly on reading and spelling disabilities. This work examined the role of problems in storage and retrieval of phonological information from long-term memory, as well as the influence of the home and school environment, on reading achievement.

At the Australian National University, he worked with A. S. (Scott) Henderson on the epidemiology of dementia and depression. This research included “integrated analyses of published work; instrument development; cross-sectional and prospective longitudinal surveys of cognitive decline, dementia and depression in general population samples; and a case-control study of Alzheimer’s disease”. This research included studies showing history of depression as a risk factor for dementia. Measures were developed for the assessment of dementia including the Informant Questionnaire on Cognitive Decline in the Elderly (IQCODE) and the Psychogeriatric Assessment Scales.

In the mid-1990s, Jorm began research on mental health literacy, introducing this term and carrying out a national survey of the mental health literacy of the Australian public. An article on this work was listed as the 5th most-cited article in the 100-year history of the Medical Journal of Australia. The research on mental health literacy was a major influence on the development of Mental health first aid training. Jorm's current research at the University of Melbourne is on building the community's capacity for prevention and early intervention on mental disorders.

Jorm has published work on expert consensus in science, including its role in establishing scientific truth, in guiding professional practice and policy, and agreeing on what are acceptable scientific methodologies. He has also written specifically about the validity and use of the Delphi method for establishing expert consensus.

Jorm has been listed as one of the most cited researchers in the mental health field in Australia and the world. In 2020, he was ranked in the top 500 most-cited scientists in the world across all scientific disciplines.

== Role in Mental Health First Aid ==
In 2000, Jorm was a founder of Mental Health First Aid training, together with his wife Betty Kitchener. He led research to evaluate the effects of Mental Health First Aid training and guidelines on how to give mental health first aid for a range of developing mental health problems and mental health crises. In 2011, together with Betty Kitchener, he founded the not-for-profit organization Mental Health First Aid International and was the inaugural chair of its board. By 2024, Mental Health First Aid training had spread to over 25 countries and over 6 million people had been trained globally with over 1 million of those in Australia.

== Editorial roles ==
He was the editor-in-chief of the Australasian Journal on Ageing from 1997 to 2001 and editor-in-chief of Mental Health & Prevention from 2019 to 2024. He was an associate editor of the Australian and New Zealand Journal of Psychiatry from 2005 to 2021 and an associate editor of Early Intervention in Psychiatry from 2006 to 2013.

== Awards and honours ==
- University of Queensland Medal, 1973
- Guy Goodricke Prize in Psychology
- Australian Psychological Society Early Career Award, 1982
- Fellow of the Academy of Social Sciences in Australia, 1994
- Ewald W Busse Research Award from the International Association of Gerontology, 1997
- Founders’ Medal, Australasian Society for Psychiatric Research, 2002
- ISI Highly Cited Researcher, 2003
- Australian Rotary Health Medal, 2007
- Thompson Scientific Citation Award, 2008
- Excellence in Mental Health Education, National Council of Behavioral Healthcare, USA, 2008.
- National Health and Medical Research Council Australia Fellow, 2009
- Outstanding Academic Mentor Award, Australian Psychological Society, 2017
- Research.com Psychology in Australia Leader Award, 2022, 2023, 2024
- Research.com Medicine in Australia Leader Award, 2023, 2024
- James McKeen Cattell Fellow Award, Association for Psychological Science, 2024
- ScholarGPS Highly Ranked Scholar- Lifetime, 2024
- Lifetime Achievement Award, National Council for Mental Wellbeing (USA), 2025.

== Personal life ==
Jorm married Betty Kitchener in 1978 and they have two children. He is a keen cyclist. He is a member of Rotary.
