= Betty Kitchener =

Australian mental health educator (born 1951)

Betty Kitchener AM
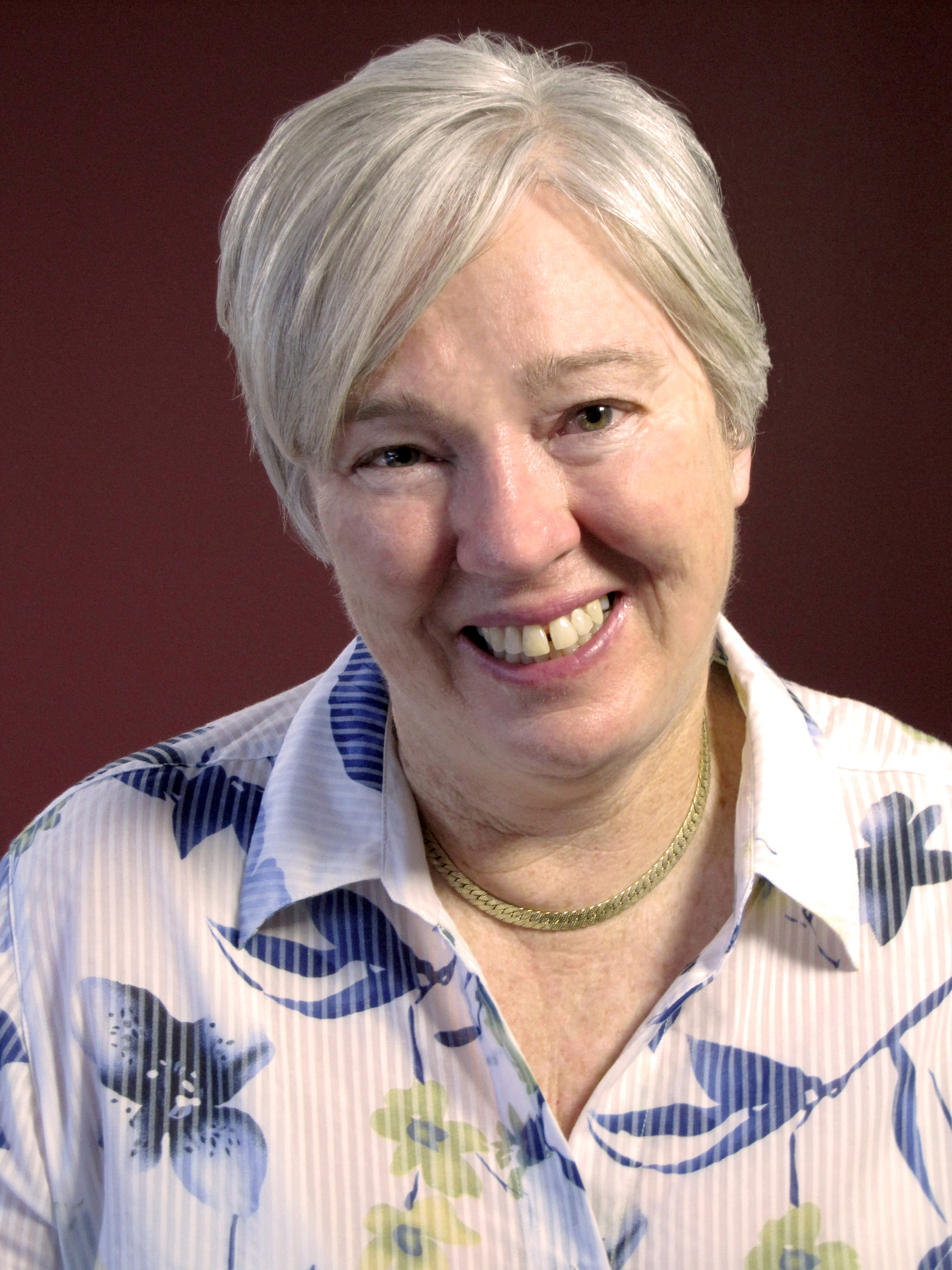
- Kitchener in 2013
- Born: 1951 (age 74–75); Sydney, New South Wales, Australia
- Education: University of New South Wales; University of Canberra
- Known for: Educator, mental health consumer advocate, co-founder of Mental health first aid training
- Spouse: Anthony Jorm
- Children: Two
- Website: mhfa.com.au

Betty Ann Kitchener AM (born 1951) is an Australian Mental Health educator who co-founded Mental health first aid training along with Professor Anthony Jorm.

== Career ==
Betty Kitchener trained as a teacher, counsellor and nurse. She is also a mental health consumer advocate, having experienced recurrent major depression. Her experiences of not being supported during those episodes especially within the workplace motivated her to want to change community attitudes towards mental illness. She has held academic appointments at the Australian National University and the University of Melbourne. Until the end of 2016, she was CEO of Mental Health First Aid Australia. She held an honorary Adjunct Professorship at Deakin University from 2013 to 2019.

== Community activism ==
In 2000, she founded Mental health first aid training in Canberra, together with her husband Anthony Jorm, who is a mental health researcher. Mental health first aid is a 12-hour face-to-face training program for members of the public to learn how to provide initial assistance to someone developing a mental health problem or in a mental health crisis (e.g. they are suicidal). This program spread across Australia and by 2011 over 170,000 Australian adults had received the training (1% of the country’s adult population). By 2015, this had reached 350,000 and by 2025 1.5 million. The training has been adapted to various cultural groups in Australia, including Aboriginal and Torres Strait Islander peoples, Vietnamese Australians and Chinese Australians. The training program has spread to many other countries, including Bangladesh, Bermuda, Canada, China, Denmark, England, Finland, France, Hong Kong, India, Ireland, Japan, Malta, Nepal, Netherlands, New Zealand, Northern Ireland, Pakistan, Portugal, Saudi Arabia, Scotland, Singapore, South Africa, Sweden, Switzerland, United Arab Emirates, the United States and Wales. By 2025, over 8 million persons had been trained in Mental Health First Aid globally.

== Awards and honours ==
Kitchener has received many awards and honours for her work on Mental health first aid, including:

- Australasian Society for Psychiatric Research Consumer Researcher Award, 2004.
- Order of Australia Medal (OAM), 2008.
- Excellence in Mental Health Education, National Council of Behavioral Healthcare, USA, 2008.
- Exceptional Contribution to Mental Health Services Award, TheMHS, 2009.
- Australian Rotary Health Knowledge Dissemination Award, 2010.
- Induction to the Victorian Honour Roll of Women, 2011.
- Addressed Parliamentary Breakfast for Canadian Parliamentarians, Ottawa, 5 June 2012.
- Finalist, Victorian Senior Australian of the Year, 2014.
- Australia's 100 Women of Influence Award, 2014.
- Member of the Order of Australia (AM), 2015, for significant service to the community through mental health support, research and education programs.
- Australia Day Ambassador, Victoria, Donald & Birchip 2015, Inglewood 2016, Shepparton 2017, Apollo Bay 2019, Sea Lake 2020
- Chancellor's Alumni Award, University of Canberra, 2015.
- Alumni Award, University of New South Wales, 2016.
- Finalist, Australian Mental Health Prize, 2016.
- The Betty Kitchener Prize established by the University of Canberra to support students pursuing mental health research projects, 2019.
- Australian Rotary Health Medal, 2024.
- Lifetime Achievement Award, National Council for Mental Wellbeing (USA), 2025.

== Publications ==
Some of her publications are the following:

- Kitchener, B.A. & Jorm, A.F. (2002). Mental Health First Aid Manual. Canberra: Centre for Mental Health Research.
- Kitchener, B.A. & Jorm, A.F. (2002). Mental health first aid training for the public: evaluation of effects on knowledge, attitudes and helping behavior. BMC Psychiatry, 2, 10.
- Kitchener, B.A., Jorm, A.F. & Kelly, C.M. (2013). Mental Health First Aid Manual (Third edition). Melbourne: Mental Health First Aid Australia.
- Kelly, C.M., Kitchener, B.A. & Jorm, A.F. (2013). Youth Mental Health First Aid: A Manual for Adults Assisting Young People (Third edition). Melbourne: Mental Health First Aid Australia.
- Hart, L.M., Kitchener, B.A., Jorm, A.F. & Kanowski, L.G. (2010). Aboriginal and Torres Strait Islander Mental Health First Aid Manual (Second edition). Melbourne: Mental Health First Aid Australia.
- Kitchener, B.A. & Jorm, A.F. (2008). Mental health first aid: An international programme for early intervention. Early Intervention in Psychiatry, 2, 55-61.
- Jorm, A.F. & Kitchener, B.A. (2011). Noting a landmark achievement: Mental Health First Aid training reaches 1% of Australian adults. Australian and New Zealand Journal of Psychiatry, 45, 808-813.
- Hart, L.M., Kelly, C.M., Kitchener, B.A. & Jorm, A.F. (2012). teen Mental Health First Aid: A manual for young people helping their friends. Melbourne: Mental Health First Aid Australia.
- Kitchener, B.A., Jorm, A.F. & Kelly, C.M. (2017). Older Person Mental Health First Aid: A Manual for Assisting People Aged 65+. Melbourne: Mental Health First Aid Australia.
- Jorm, A.F., Kitchener, B.A. & Reavley, N.J. (2019). Mental Health First Aid training: lessons learned from the global spread of a community education program. World Psychiatry, 18, 142-143.

== Gallery ==
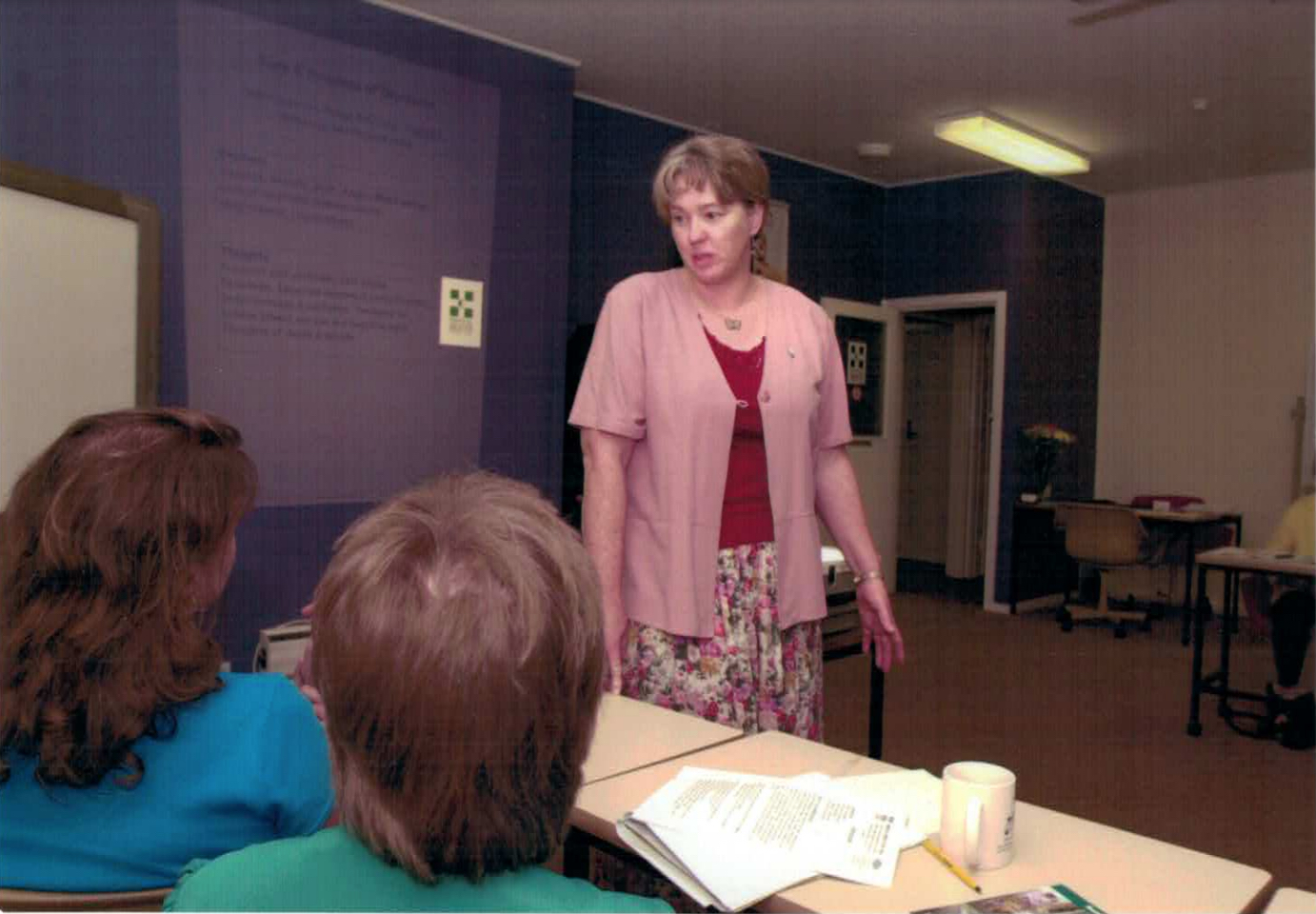
Betty Kitchener teaching early Mental Health First Aid course, Canberra, January 2001

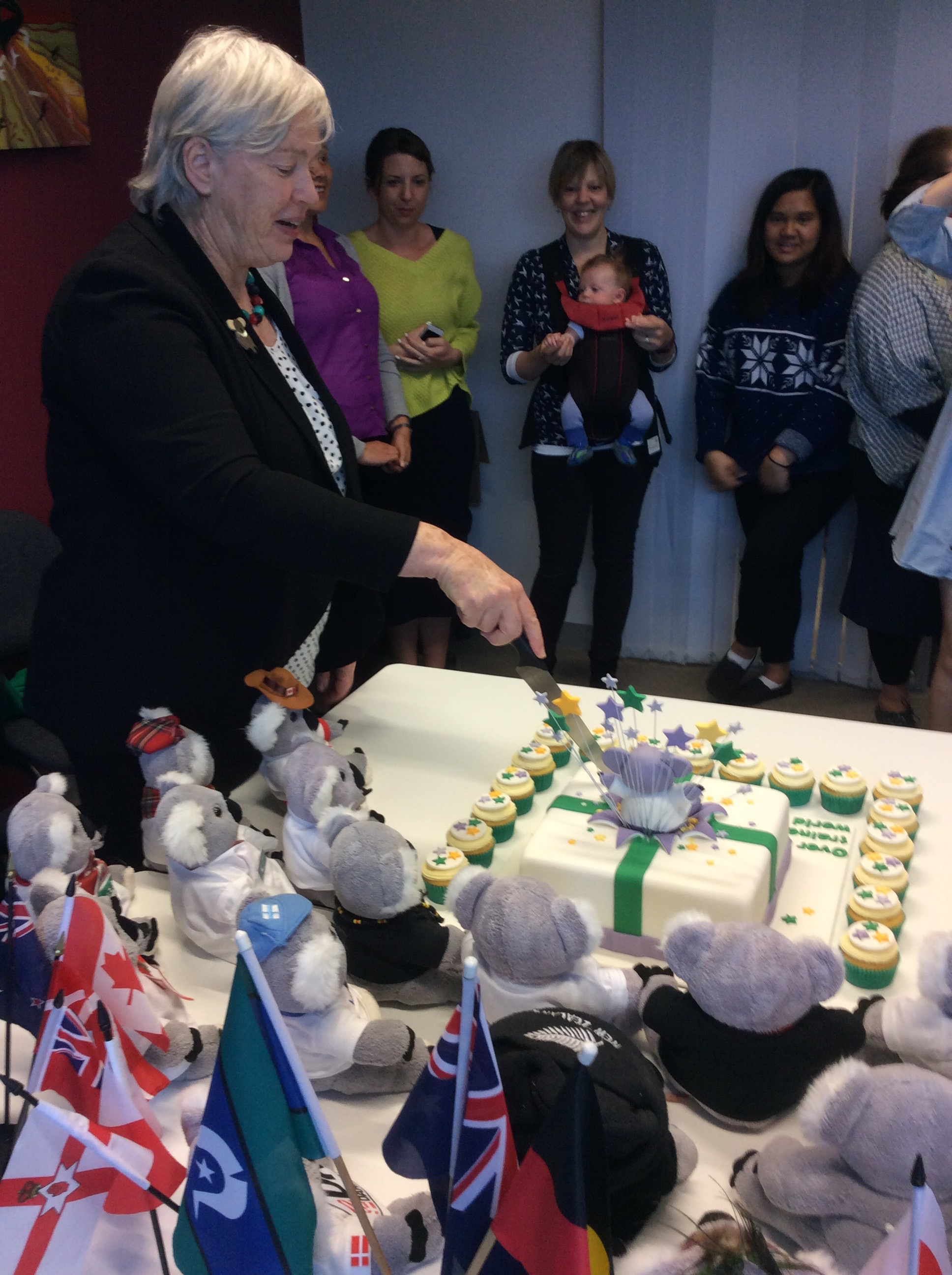
Betty Kitchener cutting cake at celebration of one million first aiders trained worldwide, Melbourne, June 2015
