= Emotional First Aid =

2013 self-help book by Guy Winch

Emotional First Aid: Practical Strategies for Treating Failure, Rejection, Guilt, and Other Everyday Psychological Injuries
- Author: Guy Winch
- Language: English
- Subject: Psychology
- Genre: Self-help book
- Published: 25 July 2013
- Publisher: Hudson Street Press
- Media type: Hardcover
- Pages: 304
- ISBN: 978-1594631207
- OCLC: 1102163764

Emotional First Aid: Practical Strategies for Treating Failure, Rejection, Guilt, and Other Everyday Psychological Injuries is a self-help book by Guy Winch, an American clinical psychologist.

== Background ==
This book is an example of bibliotherapy in which the author presents an insightful review of common psychological concerns, such as loneliness and unhealthy rumination, and outlines appropriate coping strategies for each.

== Reception ==
Toni Bernhard, a former law professor at the University of California, Davis suggests in her review at Psychology Today, "Most of us are in the habit of washing and bandaging a cut knee right away but, according to Winch, we often don’t recognize that we’ve been wounded emotionally. And, even if we do, we may underestimate the potential impact of the mental bruise, so we don’t take immediate steps to minimize its effect on our lives."

In a review, Anne Parfitt-Rogers, a Scottish doctor from the University of Edinburgh suggests, "[The Book] explores the link between rejection and violence and the self-defeating behaviors that cause us to withdraw when we are lonely or have low self-esteem, starting a vicious cycle and hampering effective relationships."

== See also ==
- Mental health first aid
- The Wellness Doctrines
