= Ian Riseley =

Australian accountant and Rotarian

Ian H.S. Riseley is an Australian accountant and businessman. From 2017 to 2018, he was the president of Rotary International.

== Biography ==
Ian Riseley was the owner of an accounting firm in Australia when, in 1977, one of his clients invited him to speak at the Rotary Club of Cheltenham. He gave a talk on income taxes. He did a few other talks and became a charter member of the Rotary Club of Sandringham in 1978. He was 31.

By the end of the 1970s, an issue arose about admitting women in the organization. He was offered a leadership role to advocate in favour of women membership within the organization. In 1989, the Rotary Club of Cheltenham opened to women memberships.

His first hands-on project was the construction of a shelter for commuters (especially the seniors) waiting for the bus in Sandringham. Since the 1980s, he majorly contributed to the Rotary International's effort to eradicate polio. In 2017, only 22 cases of polio were declared worldwide.

His wife Juliet became the charter president of the Rotary Club of Hampton in 1995.

From 1999 to 2000, Ian Riseley was the governor of District 9810.

From 2017 to 2018, Ian Riseley was the president of Rotary International. This was the fifth year in 112 years of existence that the Rotary international had an Australian president.

== Publications ==
- Stéphanie Wollard, From a Tin Shed to the United Nations (foreword by Ian Riseley)

== Awards ==
- 2002: AusAID Peacebuilder Award from the Australian government for his work in Timor-Leste
- 2006: Medal of the Order of Australia
- 2017: Recipient of the Royce Abbey Award
