= Rotary Australia World Community Service =

Australian non-profit public company

Rotary Australia World Community Service Limited
- Type: Australian non-for-profit public company limited by guarantee
- Registration no.: ABN 37739341003, ACN 003 444 264
- Purpose: Community development, disaster aid
- Location: Australia
- Region served: Australia, other countries
- Product: Humanitarian projects
- Key people: Chairman of the Board: David Pearson
- Subsidiaries: Rotary Australia Overseas Aid Fund, Rotary Australian Benevolent Society, Rotary Australia Relief Fund, Rotarians Against Malaria, Donations in Kind
- Revenue: AUD 19.4 million in 2023
- Employees: 3
- Volunteers: Approximately 267 internationally
- Website: rawcs.org.au
- Formerly called: ROTARY F A I M AUSTRALIA LTD

Rotary Australia World Community Service (RAWCS) is an Australian non-profit public company controlled the Australian division of Rotary International. Its purpose is: “Within the areas of focus of Rotary International, to enhance support services to Australian Rotarians and Rotary Clubs to assist disadvantaged communities and individuals with humanitarian aid projects.”

Each Australian Rotary District is represented through their District Governor who is a member of the Company. This membership elects a Board of Directors to govern the company on their behalf.

== Funding schemes ==
RAWCS is registered as a charity with the Australian Charities and Not-for-profits Commission. It undertakes its work through three tax-deductible funds:

- Rotary Australia Overseas Aid Fund assists local Rotary Clubs or Rotary Districts in supplying aid in developing countries (as defined by the Australian Government’s Department of Foreign Affairs and Trade) or for short term relief for disasters. In 2023, it funded 332 overseas projects in 37 countries.
- Rotary Australian Benevolent Society (RABS) assists Rotary Clubs and Rotary Districts within Australia to respond to needs within their own communities and to gain tax deductibility for donations made to their registered project. In 2023, it funded 97 projects, including 31 compassionate grants to Australians in need. Rotary Australia Compassionate Grants Projects is a subset of the RABS Projects and was established to provide matching funding on a dollar-for-dollar basis with Rotary Clubs. This project type was made possible by A$2,000,000 donated by philanthropist Dick Smith’s Trust. Matching grants are distributed to disadvantaged Australians identified by local Rotary Clubs or Rotary Districts as being in need.
- Rotary Australia Relief Fund (RARF) responds to national appeals and disburses funds to appropriate aid projects. RARF projects have included collecting donations for bushfire relief following the 2019–2020 bushfires. As of 2020, the fund had collected in excess of A$1.4 million for distribution in bushfire-affected communities.

In response to the 2017-2019 Australian drought, RAWCS and the Australian Government distributed A$6.5 million in cash grants to drought-impacted families through the Drought Community Support Initiative. It has also been involved in the delivery of the A$5 million Drought Communities Outreach Program to farming families impacted by the drought through the provision of information events and A$500 debit cards to eligible farming households.

RAWCS has been involved in Rotary projects relating to the COVID-19 pandemic in Australia, including the manufacture of protective clothing for frontline health workers.

Donations through RAWCS in 2020 totaled A$24,648,693.

== Australian Rotarians Against Malaria ==
Australian Rotarians Against Malaria (ARAM) is a Rotary organization that operates under the umbrella of RAWCS. ARAM was started in the early 1990s from a proposal by Dr Brian Hanley of the Rotary Club of Brookvale (New South Wales) who was concerned about the surge in malaria incidence after the discontinuation of DDT-based malaria control programs. It provides supplies, equipment and volunteers to support the elimination of malaria in Australia's region. It has projects in Papua New Guinea, Solomon Islands, Vanuatu, Timor Leste and West Timor (Indonesia). Projects include the supply of insecticide-treated mosquito nets and funding of staff to provide malaria diagnostic tests and antimalarial medication. In 2020, ARAM entered into a partnership with the Global Fund and other organizations to form the Malaria Elimination in Melanesia and Timor-Leste Initiative (MEMTI). This involves an international campaign to raise a significant amount of funds to enhance malaria elimination programs in its partner countries. ARAM also supports research to develop and trial a malaria vaccine by the Griffith University Institute of Glycomics.

== RARE (Rotary Australia Repurposing Equipment) ==
RARE is a Rotary organization that operates under umbrella of RAWCS and was established in 1962. Its purpose is to collect goods and consumables no longer required in the Australian health and education institutions and distribute them to developing nations and other areas of need. Recipient nations include countries of the South Pacific, Africa, the Indian subcontinent, South East Asia and South America. RARE has major storage facilities in Brisbane, Sydney, Melbourne, Geelong and Adelaide and smaller satellite storage areas in Western Australia and regional areas. These facilities are managed and staffed by volunteers. In 2023, RARE dispatched medical and educational supplies worth $3.5M across ten developing countries. Additional support was provided through the Donations In Kind facility, shipping $1M worth of supplies to ten countries.

== See also ==
- Australian Rotary Health
