= Critical incident stress management =

Aspect of psychology

- Other names: CISM
- Specialty: Psychology

Critical incident stress management (CISM) is a system of support for individuals and groups who have been exposed to trauma. It is a form of psychological first aid. It includes pre-incident preparedness and acute crisis management through post-crisis follow-up. The purpose of CISM is to decrease the severity of symptoms of post-traumatic stress disorder developing after a crisis.

The International Critical Incident Stress Foundation (ICISF) is an organization based in Baltimore, MD. The ICISF Model of Critical Incident Stress Management is in use by over 300 registered CISM Peer Support Teams in North America and around the world.

== Purpose ==
CISM is designed to help people deal with their trauma one incident at a time, by allowing them to talk about the incident without receiving judgment or criticism. The program is peer-driven by people who have completed one or more classes covering the topic.

== Recipients ==
Critical incidents are traumatic events capable of causing powerful emotional reactions in people who are exposed to those events. The most stressful of these are often seen as being line of duty deaths, co-worker suicide, multiple event incidents, delayed intervention and multi-casualty incidents. Every profession can list their own worst-case scenarios that can be categorized as critical incidents. Emergency services organizations, for example, usually list the Terrible Ten. They are:

1. Line of duty deaths
2. Suicide of a colleague
3. Serious work related injury
4. Multi-casualty / disaster / terrorism incidents
5. Events with a high degree of threat to the personnel
6. Significant events involving children
7. Events in which the victim is known to the personnel
8. Events with excessive media interest
9. Events that are prolonged and end with a negative outcome
10. Any significantly powerful, overwhelming distressing event

While any person may experience a critical incident, conventional wisdom says that members of law enforcement, fire fighting units, and emergency medical services are at great risk for experiencing traumatic events.

== Types of intervention ==
The type of intervention used depended on the situation, the number of people involved, and their proximity to the event. One form of intervention was a three-step approach, whereas different approaches include as many as five stages.Although crisis-intervention models vary in the number of stages they employ, the effectiveness of an intervention is generally considered to depend more on the appropriate application of crisis-intervention principles than on the specific number of steps in a model. The goal of the intervention is to address the trauma along the general progression: defusing, debriefing, and followup.

=== Defusing ===
A defusing is done the day of the incident before the person(s) had a chance to sleep. The defusing was designed to assure the person or people involved that their feelings are normal, to tell them what symptoms to watch for over the short term, and to offer them support, usually in the form of contact with a peer support person from their organization. Defusings are used to support groups, not individuals, who have shared the same traumatic experience. Never is a defusing done at the scene of an incident as this would violate the CISM principle of not interfering with operations. The purpose of a defusing is to assist groups in coping in the short term, address acute needs, facilitate a normalization of any symptoms that arise, and bring awareness of available resources if difficulties are encountered.

=== Critical Incident Stress Debriefing ===
Critical incident stress debriefing (CISD) is a controversial component of CISM, and research suggests it may cause harm. The International Critical Incident Stress Foundation rejects these claims, writing that "There is no extant evidence to argue that the "Mitchell model" CISD, or the CISM system, has proven harmful! The investigations that are frequently cited to suggest such an adverse effect simply did not use the CISD or CISM system as prescribed, a fact that is too often ignored".

ICISF specifies that defusings and debriefings are only intended for use with groups. The individual intervention technique used in CISM is a version of psychological first aid. A literature review concluded that a primary flaw in criticism of CISM is "the lack of consistent terminology," which has led investigators to evaluate distinct interventions as if they were identical, and to use variable outcome measures, making it difficult to compare outcomes across different studies. The review authors concluded that CISM "should continue to be offered to secondary victims of trauma."

For teams, group debriefings are suggested 48–72 hours after a critical incident giving the group an opportunity to support each other by talk about their experience, how it has affected them, brainstorm coping mechanisms, identify individuals at risk, and inform the individual or group about services available to them in their community. The final step was to follow up with them the day after the debriefing to ensure that they are safe and coping well or to refer the individual for professional counselling. CISM protocols clearly state that no one should ever be pressured or coerced to speak, contrary to some of the criticisms offered (e.g., one firefighter's account of CISM properly offered).

Although many co-opted the debriefing process for use with other groups, the primary focus in the field of CISM was to support staff members of organizations or members of communities which have experienced a traumatic event.

The debriefing process (defined by the International Critical Incident Stress Foundation [ICISF]) has seven steps: introduction of intervenor and establishment of guidelines and invites participants to introduce themselves (while attendance at a debriefing may be mandatory, participation is not); details of the event given from individual perspectives; emotional responses given subjectively; personal reaction and actions; followed again by a discussion of symptoms exhibited since the event; instruction phase where the team discusses the symptoms and assures participants that any symptoms (if they have any at all) are a normal reaction to an abnormal event and "generally" these symptoms will diminish with time and self-care; following a brief period of shared informal discussion (generally over a beverage and treat) resumption of duty where individuals are returned to their normal tasks. The intervenor is always watching for individuals who are not coping well and additional assistance is offered at the conclusion of the process.

=== Follow-up ===
The final step is follow-up and referral where indicated. This is generally done within a day, and done again the week following the debriefing, by team members as a check-in. This step identifies symptoms which may have developed or worsened over time.

== Research and Debate ==
Revisiting the debriefing debate: does psychological debriefing reduce PTSD symptomology following work-related trauma? A meta-analysis by Stileman presents a recent systematic review.

Some studies have shown that CISM protocols as described by the ICSIF have demonstrable benefits and that the benefits exceed the costs. Benefits include reduced alcohol consumption and increased quality of life.

Research by Suzanna C Rose et al., 2002, indicates that single session individual debriefing does not decrease rates of PTSD. Some organizations have adapted their practices of immediate psychological care techniques that do not use debriefing, such as those endorsed by the CDC, Red Cross, WHO, American Psychological Association and the National Center for Post Traumatic Stress Disorder.

A 2002 workshop whose goal was to reach consensus on the mental health response to mass violence recommended ending use of the word "debriefing" in reference to critical incident interventions. Recent evidence-based reviews have concluded that CISM is ineffective and sometimes harmful for both primary and secondary victims, such as responding emergency services personnel.

CISM was never intended to treat primary victims of trauma. One analysis of the psychological debriefing method used in CISM linked it to increased rates of PTSD one year after an event. As of 2022, peer-reviewed meta-analysis specifically warns against the clinical use of CISM for all patients, primary or secondary, stating, "clinical guidelines for managing post-traumatic stress recommend not to practice psychological debriefing".The International Critical Incident Stress Foundation has disputed some of the criticisms of CISM, arguing that studies reporting negative outcomes often evaluated interventions that differed from established CISM protocols.

Some meta-analyses in the medical literature have found no benefit to CISD. A three-year five-state study on the relationships between critical incident stress debriefings, firefighters' disposition, and stress reactions found very low quality evidence of benefit or negative impact for those debriefed.

, although like many of the other studies cited here, the analysis focused on the CISM for preventing PTSD, a claim that ICISF and its founders have never made.

The ICISF's founders have argued that analyses raising questions about CISM, especially the idea that it could cause harm, are based in poor research quality or misapplications of CISM principles and protocols.

One notable discrepancy is the use of the term "single session individual psychological debriefing" which is the terminology used in the Cochrane Review. This is in contrast to the ICISF Critical Incident Stress Debriefing (CISD) which is one of the group intervention tools used in the CISM continuum of care and not intended or recommended for use with individuals.

== See also ==
- Clinical psychology
- Incident stress
- Stress management
- Stress (medicine)
