= Australasian Journal on Ageing =

- Discipline: Gerontology, geriatrics
- Language: English
- Edited by: Mark Hughes

Publication details
- Former name: Australian Journal on Ageing
- History: 1982–present
- Publisher: Wiley on behalf of AJA Inc.
- Frequency: Quarterly
- Open access: Hybrid
- Impact factor: 1.876 (2021)

Standard abbreviations
- ISO 4: Australas. J. Ageing

Indexing
- ISSN: 1440-6381 (print); 1741-6612 (web)
- OCLC no.: 1016301817

Links
- Journal homepage; Online access; Online archive

The Australasian Journal on Ageing is a quarterly peer-reviewed scientific journal covering the fields of gerontology and geriatrics. It is published by Wiley on behalf of AJA Inc, which represents the Australian and New Zealand Society for Geriatric Medicine, COTA Australia and the Australian Association of Gerontology and the editor-in-chief is Mark Hughes (Southern Cross University).

The journal offers an annual Australasian Journal on Ageing Book Award for authors in the Asia-Pacific region.

== History ==
The journal was established in 1982 by the Australian Council on the Ageing (COTA) as the Australian Journal on Ageing. In 1994, COTA formed a journal management committee which included representatives from the Australian Society of Geriatric Medicine and the Australian Association of Gerontology who were later joined by representatives from Aged & Community Services Australia (1998) and the Alzheimer's Association Australia. The journal obtained its current name in 1998 to promote a broader regional focus. In 2002, Blackwell Publishing (later Blackwell-Wiley) became a partner with COTA in publishing the journal and in 2004 were appointed the professional publishers of the journal. In 2007, ownership of the journal was transferred to AJA Inc, with a management committee consisting of representatives from COTA, the Australian and New Zealand Society for Geriatric Medicine, the Australian Association of Gerontology, and Aged and Community Services Australia.

=== Editors-in-chief ===
The following persons are or have been editor-in-chief:

- Denys Correll (1982–1993)
- John McCallum (1994–1997)
- Anthony Jorm (1997–2001)
- Diane Gibson (2002–2005)
- Susan Quine (2005–2009)
- Lynne Parkinson (2009–2022)
- Mark Hughes (2023–present)

== Abstracting and indexing ==
The journal is abstracted and indexed in:

- CINAHL
- EBSCO databases
- Embase
- Index Medicus/MEDLINE/PubMed
- ProQuest databases
- PsycINFO
- Science Citation Index Expanded
- Scopus
- Social Sciences Citation Index
- Sociological Abstracts

According to the Journal Citation Reports, the journal has a 2021 impact factor of 1.876.
