= Incident stress =

Condition caused by acute stress

Incident stress is a condition caused by acute stress which overwhelms a staff person trained to deal with critical incidents such as within the line of duty for first responders, EMTs, and other similar personnel. If not recognized and treated at onset, incident stress can lead to more serious effects of posttraumatic stress disorder.

== Signs and symptoms ==
Signs and symptoms can manifest different reactions for each and every individual. These signs and symptoms can be emotional, physical, behavioral, or cognitive. Seeking medical attention is recommended if signs and symptoms occur over time and/or become more severe.

Emotional	Physical	Behavioral	Cognitive
Anxiety; Guilt; Denial; Grief; Fear; Irritability; Loss of emotional control; Depression; Sense of failure; Feeling overwhelmed; Blaming others or self; Severe panic (rare)	Fatigue; Nausea/vomiting; Chills; Dizziness; Profuse sweating; Thirst; Headaches; Visual difficulties; Clenching of jaw; Nonspecific aches and pains; Chest pain; Difficulty breathing; Symptoms of shock (shallow breathing, weak or rapid pulse, nausea, shivering, pale and moist skin, mental confusion, dilated pupils)	Intense anger; Withdrawal; Emotional outburst; Temporary loss or increase of appetite; Excessive alcohol consumption; Inability to rest, pacing; Change in sexual functioning	Confusion; Uncertainty; Disorientation; Heightened or lowered alertness; Poor Concentration; Poor problem solving; Difficulty identifying familiar objects or people; Memory problems; Nightmares

== Symptomatology ==
Symptomatology associated with excessive acute or sustained stress may include cognitive impairments such as diminished memory, decision-making capacity, and attention span; emotional reactions such as anger, irritability, guilt, fear, paranoia, and depression; and physical problems ranging from fatigue, dizziness, migraine headaches, and high blood pressure to diabetes and cancer. Self-destructive and antisocial behavior may also be triggered. Symptoms can vary depending on several factors, such as trauma severity, the amount of social support, and additional life stresses.

== Causes ==
A critical incident that occurs to an individual is the starting point for incident stress if the individual is unable to cope. Critical incidents are defined as sudden, unexpected events that have an emotional impact sufficient to overwhelm the usually effective coping skills of an individual and cause significant psychological damage.

Healthy attachment among adults is key to managing critical incident stress. Adults have four attachment styles: 1) fearful avoidant, 2) anxious-preoccupied, 3) dismissive avoidant, and 4) secure. Fearful avoidant adults have mixed feelings about close relationships, because they want emotional connections but are very reluctant to allow them. Anxious-preoccupied adults tend to deal with their stress by distancing themselves from the reality of the situation to avoid the emotional burden. They also tend to see themselves negatively and doubt their worth in relationships frequently. Dismissive avoidant adults view themselves as self-sufficient, and in no need of emotional connectedness. Secure adults have positive views about themselves, and feel comfortable with independence and intimacy. Secure adults typically cope better with critical incident stress, as opposed to non-secure adults, because they develop less stress by nature. Secure adults are also less likely to develop post traumatic stress disorder (PTSD).

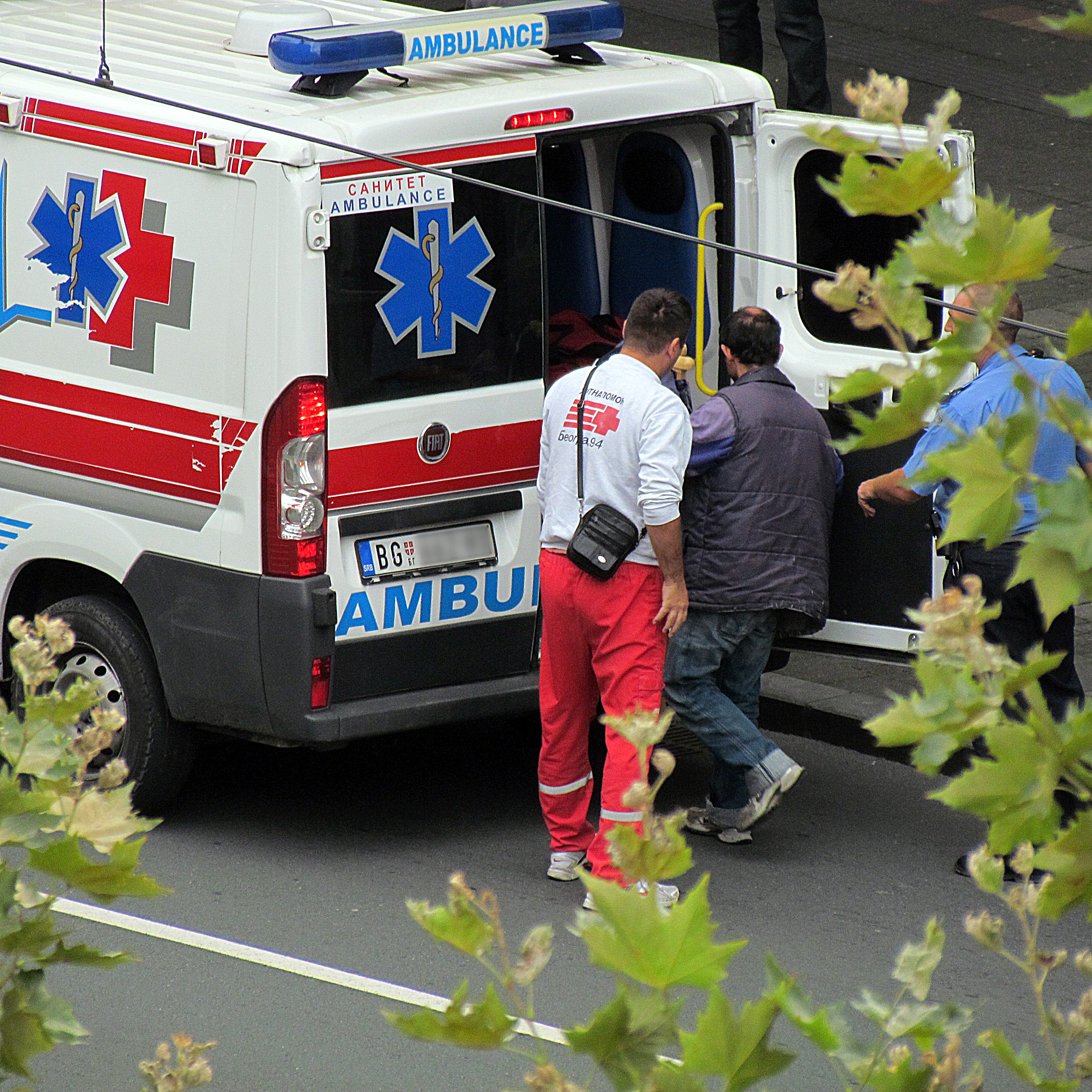
Emergency workers must respond quickly to incidents. Incident stress can occur immediately while a worker is still on the scene, or manifest at a later time.

People exhibiting signs of incident stress require professional help to avoid the more serious condition of posttraumatic stress disorder. The DSM IV-TR describes posttraumatic stress disorder (PTSD) as having three distinct symptom clusters: 1) re-experiencing the event, 2) avoidance of stimuli associated with the event and numbing of general responsiveness, and 3) increased arousal. The first symptom cluster, re-experiencing the event, is a mixture of physical and psychological reactions someone goes through after the critical event has occurred. This includes nightmares, reoccurring thoughts/flashbacks, or panic attacks. The second symptom cluster, avoidance of stimuli associated with the event and numbing of general responsiveness, occurs when someone avoids anything that could possibly trigger memories of the critical event. This includes thoughts and feelings associated with the event, and even physical stimuli such as people and places having to do with the event. The third symptom cluster, increased arousal, produces anxiety-driven responses, such as trouble sleeping, excessive anger and irritability, hypervigilance, poor concentration, and exaggerated startle response. When these symptoms persist for more than 2 weeks, a diagnosis of acute stress disorder may be appropriate. Factors, such as family psychiatric history, or childhood abuse may mediate the relationship between critical incidents and PTSD.

== Management ==
Critical incident-stress debriefings (CISDs) have proven to be a successful coping method over the past 15 years for individuals in high-stress, emergency response professions. Nearly 300 CISD teams exist in the United States, offering intervention to fire, paramedic, police, and other emergency personnel. These debriefings are designed to offer emotional reassurance, time for ventilation of feelings, education about stress management, and consultation. This technique was first implemented by Jeff Mitchell, of the International Critical Incident Stress Foundation, in 1983 to treat emergency care workers in the mental health profession. These debriefings were created to prevent worsening of the stress and also promote recovery. Judith Herman, author of Trauma & Recovery, identified three critical conditions that must be satisfied in order to progress toward recovery: 1) safety, 2) remembrance and mourning, and 3) reconnection. Safety is achieved when victims learn to feel relaxed and trust in the recovery process by recognizing there are disturbed emotions. "Remembrance and mourning" of the critical incident is necessary in order for the victim to move toward recovery. "Reconnection" occurs when the victim feels they are emotionally stable enough to pursue stress management and recovery.

Problem-solving appraisals were tested as another possible method for coping with critical incident stress. The first successful testing of this technique was done by Sarah Baker and Karen Williams in the United Kingdom, using a testing group of stressed firefighters. These firefighters filled out anonymous self-report questionnaires that gauged their level of stress. The research results supported the hypothesis that problem-solving appraisals serve a moderating function between work stress and psychological distress.

A study published in 2008, suggests dealing with the traumatic event immediately after it occurring proved beneficial in emergency medical technicians (EMTs). The intervention methods that were the most important to these EMT participants were supervisor support and a timeout period. A supportive supervisor was looked at with appreciation while a non-supportive supervisor was looked at as critical. A timeout period is defined as 0.5–1 hour of time that the EMT halts working. This time can be spent alone but more frequently with peers. This time gives the EMT the opportunity to talk about the incident casually before having to do the paperwork, or talk about unrelated things to relax and decompress. The participants of this study described education, addressing barriers to support and improving chronic workplace stressors as suggestions and recommendations on what they thought helped the most when dealing with critical incidents.

== Prevention ==
No evidence has been shown to completely prevent incident stress. There have been studies showing there are ways to greatly reduce the impact front line workers experience. Responders must take care of themselves for their own safety and to maintain the safety of others. Monitoring by conversations or observations could identify early signs for responders. Maintaining health on-site and following the incident are key. Steps that could help reduce stress after an incident:

- Control of the organization and pace of the rescue and recovery efforts
- Preparedness
- Maintaining nutrition and rest
- Monitoring mental/emotional health
- Limiting noise and odor exposures
- Timeout period
- Non-caffeinated fluids
- Low fat and low sugar food
- Do not rush back to work
- "The ability to successfully be able to adapt to stressors, maintaining psychological well being in the face of adversity", or "resilience", acts as a protective factor for mental and behavioral health issues

== Epidemiologic data from current studies ==
- Depression was reported in 6.8%, with mild depression most common (3.5%), in a case-control study of certified EMS professionals
- Probable PTSD was found in 16.8% of emergency physicians
- 37% of fire and EMS professionals have contemplated suicide (nearly 10 times the rate of American adults, 2015)
- Of 1,027 current and retired U.S. firefighters, the prevalence estimates of suicidal ideation (46.8%), plans (19.2%), and attempts (15.5%)
- About 3/4 police officers reported having experienced a traumatic event, but less than half told their agency about it
- There was a 24.7% prevalence of depression and a 47.7% prevalence of both depression and anxiety following police officers after 9/11
- Following a study after Hurricane Katrina, alcoholic drinks increased from 2 to 7 drinks per day for police officers

== See also ==
- Critical incident stress management
