= Australian Rotary Health =

Australian not-for-profit organisation

- add logo
- Founder: Ian Scott
- Purpose: Mental health
- Location: Parramatta, New South Wales, Australia
- Region served: Australia
- Product: Health research, and community awareness and education about health
- Key people: Joy Gillett OAM, CEO
- Website: www.australianrotaryhealth.org.au
- Formerly called: Australian Rotary Health Research Fund

Australian Rotary Health (ARH) is a national, not-for-profit organisation which funds health research and provides community education about health in Australia. The organisation supports work on a broad range of health problems, but specialises in mental health. It is supported by Australian Rotary Clubs.

== History ==
ARH was founded by Ian Scott, a member of the Rotary Club of Mornington, Victoria. In 1981, Scott was so moved by the impact of sudden infant death syndrome (SIDS) on families that he resolved to set up a fund to support research on this and other family health problems. This resulted in the establishment of the Australian Rotary Health Research Fund (later called ARH) with Royce Abbey as the inaugural chair of the board. The Fund offered its first research grants in 1985. The Fund initially supported research on sudden infant death syndrome, including a project which showed that prone sleeping position of the infant was a major risk factor. An information campaign following this research led to a rapid fall in the deaths from SIDS in Australia. Subsequently, the Fund supported a number of areas of research, including environmental health problems of the aged, adolescent health and family health. From 2000, it began to specialise in support for mental illness research in recognition of the adverse effects that mental illness had on the health and wellbeing of children, youth and adults in Australia. ARH is currently the largest non-government funder of research in this area in Australia. In 2009, the name was changed from the Australian Rotary Health Research Fund to Australian Rotary Health because the organisation had broadened its scope to include community mental health awareness and education activities, in addition to support for research.

== Support for research ==
ARH currently provides a number of types of support for mental illness research, including project grants, PhD scholarships and Post-doctoral Fellowships. In addition, it supports research into a wide range of other health problems with Funding Partner Grants, which involve Rotary Clubs raising money for a specific project and ARH providing matching support. ARH also supports students training as health professionals with Indigenous Health Scholarships, Rural Medical Scholarships and Rural Nursing Scholarships.

In addition to the important research on SIDS, ARH has provided funding for a number of projects that have had a practical impact on Australia or have received awards for their importance. These include projects on: nutrition and mental health, clonidine added to psychostimulant medication for hyperactive and aggressive children, e-therapy for anxiety disorders, media reporting of suicide and mental health first aid guidelines.

== Community awareness and education activities ==
ARH has broadened its activities to include many community awareness and education activities, particularly in the mental health area. They have included Community Mental Health Forums, Mental Health First Aid Workshops and training of young researchers to better communicate with the public. ARH also offers an annual Knowledge Dissemination Award through the Australasian Society for Psychiatric Research, for excellence in knowledge dissemination and research translation.

== Fund raising ==
Most of the funds provided by ARH have come from donations by Rotarians. In order to broaden the donor base, ARH launched Hat Day in 2011 as an annual fund-raising event aimed at the general public.

== Key people ==
CEO: Joy Gillett OAM

Chairman of the Board: Greg Ross

Patrons: Glen Kinross AO, Rotary International President 1997–98; Sir Clem Renouf AM, Rotary International President 1978–79; His Excellency General the Honourable Sir Peter Cosgrove AK MC (Retd)

== See also ==
- Rotary Australia World Community Service
