= Ian Scott (Rotarian) =

Ian Laurence Scott
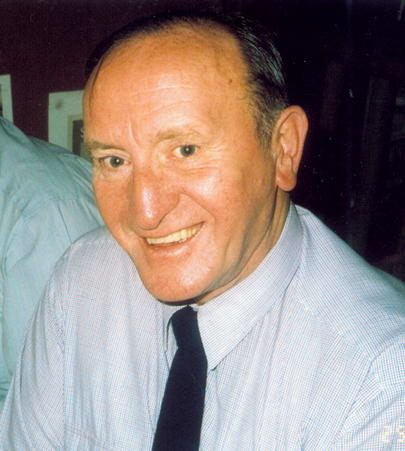
- Born: 12 October 1933; Mirboo North, Victoria
- Died: 24 January 2001 (aged 67); Mornington, Victoria
- Occupation: Banker
- Employer: National Bank
- Known for: Founder of Australian Rotary Health

Ian Laurence Scott (12 October 1933 – 24 January 2001) was an Australian Rotarian who founded Australian Rotary Health (ARH), a major non-government funder of medical research in Australia.

== Career ==
Ian Scott was a banker who worked for the then National Bank. Starting in this home town of Mirboo North, Victoria, he rose through the ranks to become a Manager, Regional Manager then City Executive. Scott joined Rotary in 1973. He served in many Rotary Clubs throughout New South Wales and Victoria. In 1981, while a member of the Rotary Club of Mornington, Victoria, Scott was moved by the plight of families affected by sudden infant death syndrome (SIDS). To encourage further research on this problem, he proposed that Rotary establish a national research foundation with a corpus of A$2 million to fund health research, with a focus on family health problems. Rotary accepted this proposal and Scott served as treasurer on the board of the Australian Rotary Health Research Fund (later called Australian Rotary Health). By 1995, ARH had raised enough money to fund its first grants, which went to research on SIDS. Research supported by ARH led to a major decrease in mortality from SIDS in Australia. ARH has subsequently supported research into a number of other areas, including environmental health problems of the aged, adolescent health, family health and mental illness. It is currently the major non-government supporter of mental illness research in Australia. By 2011, over A$24 million had been contributed to medical research in Australia.

== Honours ==
In 1989, Ian Scott was made a Life Member of ARH, the organization's highest honour.

In 2000, ARH introduced Ian Scott PhD Scholarships to recognise Scott's service to Rotary and mankind. By 2011, 29 PhD students had received these scholarships.

In 2007, the Rotary Club of Mornington dedicated a gazebo in Mornington Memorial Park to the memory of Ian Scott.
