= Behavioral Crisis Response =

Mental health crisis intervention program in Minneapolis, Minnesota

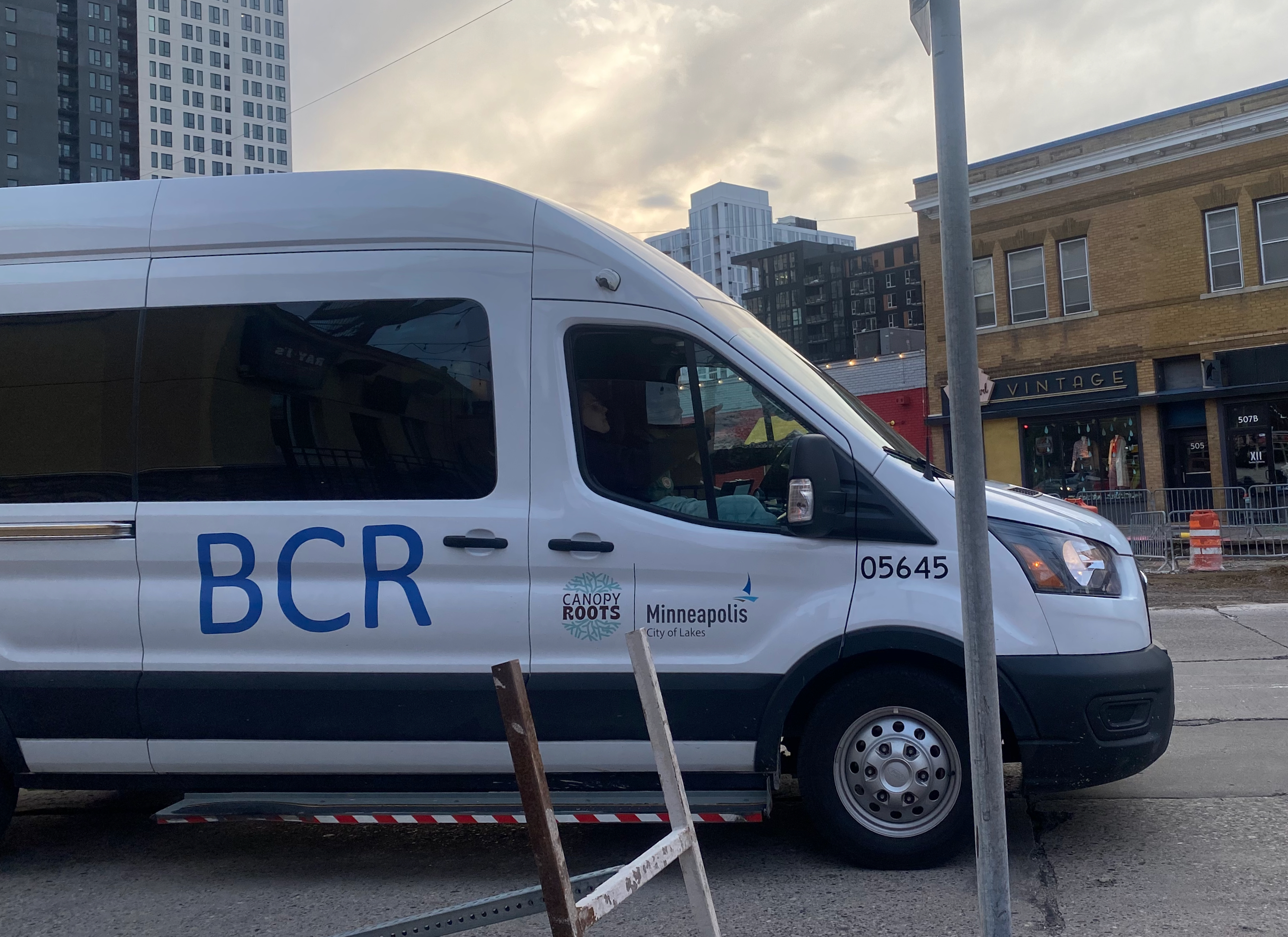
A Behavioral Crisis Response unit in Northeast Minneapolis, 2024

Behavioral Crisis Response (BCR) is a behavioral health emergency response program in Minneapolis, Minnesota. This program dispatches unarmed mental health professionals to 911 calls. It is run by Canopy Mental Health and Consulting, a Richfield, Minnesota-based company in mental health services, in collaboration with the Office of Community Safety.

The program was established in 2021 and has responded to around 20,000 calls as of February 2024.

== History ==
The Behavioral Crisis Response was initiated after an increase in community calls for alternative public safety responses following the Murder of George Floyd. The team launched in December 2021, with two vans operating from Monday through Friday, 7:30 AM-midnight. By June 2022, the city was routing 114 BCR calls per week. In April 2022, operations were expanded to 24 hours a day on weekdays, and 9 am–4 pm on Saturday and Sunday. The initial program implementation also included training for 911 responders in mental health.

The 2021–2022 contract was for $6 million over 2 years. Mayor Jacob Frey proposed an expansion of the program for the 2023–2024 city budget. The budget expansion was approved and brought the total to $5.9 million annually for 2023-2024.

The 2023 investigation of the Minneapolis Police Department by the US Department of Justice cited several issues with the city's response to mental health calls prior to 2021, noting violations of the Americans with Disabilities Act. However, after investigators did ride-alongs with these responders, the report praised the BCR program for their "timely, compassionate, and impactful services."

== Program Details ==
The Behavioral Crisis Response team is run by Canopy Mental Health & Consulting, also known as Canopy Roots. This team of unarmed mental health care professionals and mental health practitioners operates 24 hours a day, 7 days a week, with three vans in the daytime and two overnight. In order to receive a response from the BCR team, mental health crisis calls must not involve weapon(s), physical violence, medical emergencies, or drugs/alcohol.

Unlike a police Crisis Intervention Team, BCR dispatches pairs of trained mental health workers without administration by the police, acting more as a mobile crisis unit. Teams are dispatched directly from 911. Responders are dressed in casual navy blue instead of a uniform; they arrive to crises in a white van, without lights or sirens, marked with the City of Minneapolis and Canopy Roots Logos and the letters "BCR". In an arrangement like that between police and fire departments, both BCR and the MPD are able to request assistance from each other when circumstances change.

The city also maintains a separate non-emergency response call line, "311". This call line can handle issues such as parking and traffic issues, as well as theft and property damage. Theft and property damage calls are still reported to the police. Parking and traffic issues route through traffic control. The 311 number also only operates from 7 am to 7 pm. From April through June 2022, 1,600 calls were routed through the 311 number.

== See also ==
- CAHOOTS (crisis response)
- Police crisis intervention team
- Mobile Crisis
