= Royce Abbey =

Australian public leader

Royce Abbey AO DCM
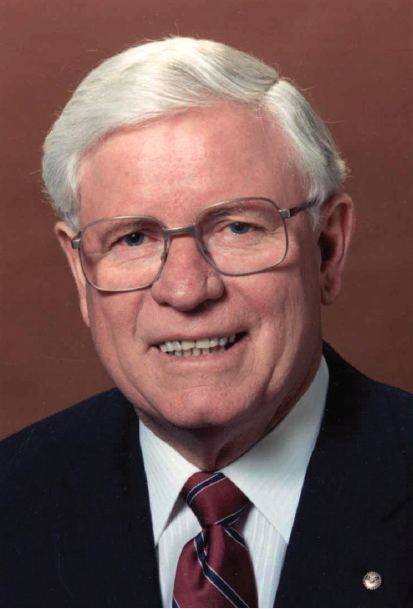
- Born: Albert Henry Royce Abbey; 8 June 1922; Footscray, Victoria
- Died: 20 February 2014 (aged 91); Melbourne, Victoria
- Occupation: Businessman
- Employer(s): Dural Leeds, Hunter Douglas
- Known for: President of Rotary International
- Spouse: Jean Abbey (nee Jean Armstrong)
- Website: royceabbey.com

Albert Henry Royce Abbey, AO, DCM (8 June 1922 – 20 February 2014) was an Australian businessman who was President of Rotary International from 1988 to 1989.

== Career ==
Royce Abbey was educated at state primary and secondary schools in Footscray, Victoria. When he left school in his mid-teens he worked as a shoeshine boy and messenger at a shoe shop and then in a real estate agency. In 1941, he enlisted in the Second Australian Imperial Force for service in the Second World War and was deployed to New Guinea and New Britain. He was awarded a Distinguished Conduct Medal for bravery and leadership during fighting. He was later commissioned as a lieutenant.

After the war, Abbey joined his brother in a family-owned window shades manufacturing business, Dural Leeds, which was later taken over by the multinational company Hunter Douglas. After five years as marketing director for Hunter Douglas, he established his own business, Abbey Marketing.

== Community service ==
Royce Abbey joined the Rotary Club of Essendon in 1954, becoming Club President in 1963–64 and District 280 (9800) Governor in 1969–70. He was elected to the Rotary International Board in 1976–77 and served as vice-president in 1977–78. He was inaugural chairman of the Board of Australian Rotary Health from 1982 to 1988. In 1988–89 he became President of Rotary International. His time as president included the continued development of the Polio Plus campaign for Poliomyelitis eradication and the re-establishment of Rotary Clubs in countries from the former Soviet Union.

Royce Abbey was involved in a number of other community service activities, including:

- Councillor, City of Essendon, 1960–1963.
- President, National Council of YMCAs of Australia, 1982–1986.
- Life Governor, National Council of YMCAs of Australia.
- Chairman and Trustee, Epworth Medical Foundation, 1990–2000.
- Patron, Australians Against Child Abuse.
- Board Member and Trustee, Centre for Molecular Biology and Medicine.
- Member of the Board, Kidsafe Australia.

The Rotary District Governors of 1988/1989 decided to create the Royce & Jean Endowed Fund in recognition of Abbey's work with the organization. The fund finances agricultural and related scholarships in Asia-Pacific. Applicants spend three months in Australia with a $10K funding to undermine practical training.

== Honours ==
Royce Abbey received the following honours:

- Distinguished Conduct Medal (for gallantry), 1945.
- Rotary Foundation Citation for Meritorious Service, 1976.
- Queen Elizabeth II Silver Jubilee Medal (for youth services), 1977.
- Member of the Order of Australia, 1988.
- Advance Australia Ambassador, 1989.
- Victorian of the Year, 1989.
- Officer of the Order of Australia, 2001.
- Honoured as Victoria University Legend during the university's 90 years celebration, 2006.
- The Royce Abbey Room is named in his honour at International House (University of Melbourne).
- The Royce and Jean Abbey Endowed Fund and the Vocational Scholarship were established by Rotary to finance agricultural and related scholarships that would assist the less-developed countries in the Asia-Pacific region.
- Australian Rotary Health has named the Royce Abbey Postdoctoral Fellowship in his honour.
