= Epsychology =

Epsychology is a form of psychological intervention delivered via information and communication technology. epsychology interventions have most commonly been applied in areas of health; examples are depression, adherence to medication, and smoking cessation. Future applications of epsychology interventions are likely to become increasingly more common in information, organization, and management sciences (e.g. organizational change, conflict management and negotiation skills).

Recently, several meta-analyses have documented the effects of epsychology interventions. In general, it appears that intensive theory-based interventions that include multiple behaviour change techniques and modes of delivery (e.g. mobile phones and the Internet) are the most effective. More specifically, interventions based on the theory of planned behaviour and cognitive-behavioural therapy seem to provide the most promising results. These findings should, however, be interpreted with caution as many research articles fail to report the theoretical underpinnings of epsychology interventions adequately.

== Business and commercialization ==
Lifestyle and non-communicable diseases, such as excessive alcohol consumption, depression, and physical inactivity, are the leading causes of morbidity and premature mortality. Thus, there is a great potential for utilizing epsychology to reach out and deliver prevention and treatment to the public by means of information technology. Information technology has a high scalability and given the usage and population statistics on, for example, Internet technology, researchers argue that we simply cannot afford to ignore information technology as a viable approach to public health.

Among the first companies to take advantage of the new technological opportunities combined with state-of-the-art psychological research were Health Media in the US (later acquired by Johnson & Johnson) and the privately held Changetech AS in Norway. Epsychology interventions are considered a supplement to existing treatments rather than a substitute, although such interventions can be used as a stand-alone treatment given that they are more cost-effective than standard treatment.

Pharmaceutical companies Janssen-Cilag and Novartis were also early out with patient-support programs that came with the patients' medication. The purpose in such programs is primarily to help patients take their medication as prescribed. A lack of medical compliance is a serious health problem even among patients diagnosed with severe and potentially fatal diseases such as cancer or HIV/AIDS. In fact, in one study about 70% of hospital visits for adverse drug reactions were caused by inadequate medical compliance. Although patient-support programs may lack in theoretical orientation, it is clear that they try to help patients manage an inherent psychological problem.

== See also ==
- eHealth
- Persuasive technology
- Psychology
- Cyberpsychology
