= The Wellness Doctrines =

2015 book by Jerome Doraisamy

The Wellness Doctrines for law students and young lawyers
- First edition
- Author: Jerome Doraisamy
- Language: English
- Genre: Self-help book
- Publication date: 2015

The Wellness Doctrines for law students and young lawyers is a self-help book published by Jerome Doraisamy, a former lawyer and academic. He first wrote The Wellness Doctrines for Law Students and Young Lawyers in 2015. He published the second book The Wellness Doctrines for high school students in April 2018. The book has been widely discussed in legal communities in Australia and worldwide. The initial book peaked at #2 on iTunes.
