= CAHOOTS (crisis response) =

Mental health crisis intervention program in Eugene, Oregon

- Formation: 1989; 36 years ago

CAHOOTS (Crisis Assistance Helping Out On The Streets) is a mental-health-crisis intervention program in Eugene, Oregon, which has handled some lower-risk emergency calls involving mental illness and homelessness since 1989. This makes it the earliest, or one of the earliest, Mobile Crisis Teams.

In most American cities, police have been responding to such calls and at least 25% of people killed in police encounters had been suffering from serious mental illness. Many cities in the US and elsewhere have been considering and implementing something like CAHOOTS. In 2015, Stockholm a similar concept was considered a success. In early 2020, Denver started a similar program. After the George Floyd protests that year, several hundred cities in the US interested in implementing similar programs requested information from CAHOOTS.

In 2021, the US enacted legislation to cover 85% of the expenses for three years for Mobile Crisis Teams, directing $1 billion to the effort. By the end of the year, many cities were starting such programs, such as Minneapolis' Behavioral Crisis Response. By 2024, most US states had multiple cities implementing such programs, or had them available state-wide.

== Program ==
Calls to 988, or calls to 911 that are related to addiction, disorientation, mental health crises, and homelessness but which don't pose a danger to others are routed to CAHOOTS. Staff members respond in pairs; usually one has training as a medic and the other has experience in homeless street outreach or mental health support. Responders attend to immediate health issues, de-escalate, and help formulate a plan, which may include finding a bed in a homeless shelter or transportation to a healthcare facility. CAHOOTS is dependent upon the availability of other services: a team may be able to talk a person in crisis into going to a hospital or a homeless shelter, but there must be a hospital or homeless shelter available to accept the person. In 2020, the service began operating 24 hours a day.

CAHOOTS does not handle requests that involve violence, weapons, crimes, medical emergencies, or similarly dangerous situations. Some calls require both CAHOOTS and law enforcement to be called out initially, and sometimes CAHOOTS calls in law enforcement or law enforcement calls in CAHOOTS, for instance in the case of a homeless person who is in danger of being ticketed. About 60% of all calls to CAHOOTS are for homeless people.

In 2019, CAHOOTS responded to 13% of all emergency calls for service made to the Eugene Police Department (EPD). Many of the calls made are requests for CAHOOTS service and not ones to which police would normally respond. In 2019, 83% of the calls to which CAHOOTS responded were for "Welfare Check", "Transportation", or general public assistance, none of which are traditionally handled by EPD. Thus the "true divert rate"—meaning the proportion of calls to which police would have responded were it not for CAHOOTS—was estimated to be between 5-8%.

Calls handled by CAHOOTS alone require police backup only about 2% of the time, although that rate is much higher when responding to calls that police would normally handle. For example, in 2019 when CAHOOTS responded to calls for "Criminal Trespass" and located the subject, they needed police backup 33% of the time.

The internal organization operates under a non-hierarchical, consensus-oriented model. As of 2020, most staff were paid US $18 per hour. In 2018, the program cost $800,000, as compared to $58 million for the police.

== Challenges and resources for replicating the model ==
Some places have struggled to implement this model because it is dependent upon the existence of appropriate social services in the area. One director at CAHOOTS asks, "Where are you going to bring someone if not to the hospital or the jail?"

Taleed El-Sabawi and Jennifer J. Carroll wrote a paper detailing this and other considerations for local governments to keep in mind, as well as offering model legislation.

== History ==
CAHOOTS was founded in 1989 by the Eugene Police Department and White Bird Clinic, a nonprofit mental health crisis intervention initiative that had been in existence since 1969 as an "alternative for those who didn't trust the cops." From its founding, White Bird Clinic had an informal working relationship with local law enforcement. The establishment of CAHOOTS formalized the relationship. The name, an acronym for Crisis Assistance Helping Out On The Streets, was chosen because the White Bird Clinic "was now 'in cahoots' with the police."

== See also ==
- Homeless street outreach
