= Police crisis intervention team =

Mental health crisis response training for police officers

A Crisis Intervention Team (CIT) is a police mental health collaborative program found in North America. The term "CIT" is often used to describe both a program and a training in law enforcement to help guide interactions between law enforcement and those living with a mental illness.

The National Alliance on Mental Illness (NAMI) Crisis Intervention Team (CIT) programs are local initiatives designed to improve the way law enforcement and the community respond to people experiencing mental health crisis. CIT programs are built on strong partnerships between law enforcement, mental health provider agencies, and individuals and families affected by mental illness."

== History ==
Mental health contacts and intervention by law enforcement became part of the profession with the deinstitutionalization of nonviolent mentally ill patients in the 1960s. The goal was to allow people receiving treatment in an institution to continue to receive the treatment, but from community service agencies. The money saved by hospital closures was to be transferred to outpatient community programs.

The money intended for outpatient services did not always reach the community. Funding for outpatient treatment services and programs remains lacking in many areas of the United States. This created a gap for people in need of services. Without the assistance, many people stop their treatment programs, which results in some individuals becoming unstable while living in the community, with their families, who are not always equipped to be caregivers.

When people living with serious mental illness experienced psychotic episodes or had a poor quality of life in communities, the police often became the primary resource for assistance. Law enforcement has historically been seen as serving vulnerable community members, typically viewed as victims of crime. Due to the lack of resources and treatment for people with mental illness, they became some of the most vulnerable individuals in many communities, leading officers to become frontline mental health workers.

In September 1987, Memphis, Tennessee, police responded to a 911 call involving a man with a history of mental illness who was cutting himself with a knife and threatening suicide. When officers arrived, they ordered the man to drop the knife. The man became more upset and ran toward the officers with the knife still in his hand. Officers then shot and killed the man.

Officers were trained to use deadly force when they perceived their own or someone else's life to be in grave danger. This incident received criticism because the perception was that the only life in danger was the man who wanted to harm himself. This occurred during a time of racial tension in Memphis, and the man was African-American; both officers were white. This incident was the catalyst for the creation of the Crisis Intervention Team (CIT) in Memphis.

The Memphis Police Department partnered with the Memphis chapter of the National Alliance on Mental Illness, mental health providers, and two universities (University of Memphis and University of Tennessee) in organizing, training, and implementing a specialized unit. This new alliance aimed to develop a more intelligent, understandable, and safe approach to mental health crisis events. The community effort led to the formation of the Memphis Police Department's Crisis Intervention Team.

The Memphis CIT program has achieved notable success, in large part due to its true community partnership. Today, the "Memphis Model" has been adopted by more than 2,700 communities in the U.S. and other countries.

== Core elements ==
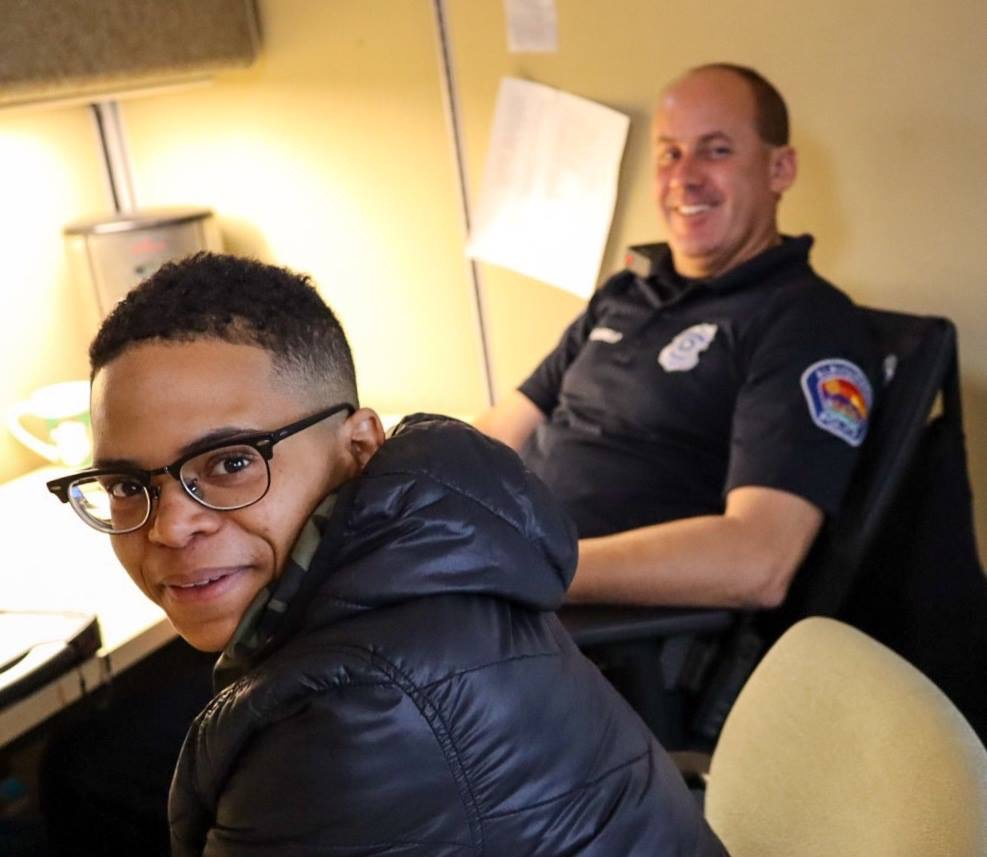
Co-response with law enforcement officer and a clinical counselor

The University of Memphis School of Urban Affairs and Public Policy's Department of Criminology and Criminal Justice CIT Center released a paper outlining central components of CIT in 2007. The elements of CIT programs identified are:

- Ongoing elements:
  - Partnerships: law enforcement, advocacy, mental health
  - Community ownership: planning, implementation & networking
  - Policies and procedures
- Operational elements:
  - CIT: officer, dispatcher, coordinator
  - Curriculum: CIT training
  - Mental health receiving facility: emergency services
- Sustaining elements:
  - Evaluation and research
  - In-service training
  - Recognition and honors

== Implementations ==
=== United States ===
==== Oregon ====
In Oregon, CIT programs were implemented after the death of James Chasse, who was beaten and repeatedly tasered by three Portland police officers in 2006. Chasse, who had schizophrenia, suffered 16 broken ribs, a broken shoulder and sternum, along with severe internal injuries. He was transported to the city jail, but the medical staff refused to admit him and directed that he be taken to a hospital. Unfortunately, he died during the transfer. The three officers involved were never charged for their role in his death. Later medical testimony indicated that his broken ribs were probably caused by the emergency trauma care he received (namely, CPR).

Chasse's death prompted an outcry in the news media, in response to which Portland mayor Tom Potter instituted a CIT program. Other cities and counties in Oregon followed suit.

==== Texas ====
Starting in late 2011, a group of Texas CIT officers met in Austin, Texas, to lay the foundation for Texas's first CIT Officers' Association. The association's goal is to promote mental health education as it pertains to law enforcement's interaction and care for the mentally ill. As of 2012, the association hosted an annual conference at which stakeholders discussed new options for better practices in the field. The association launched its website in 2012.

==== New Mexico ====
In Albuquerque, New Mexico, the police department began a Crisis Intervention Team program in 1996 after 6 people were killed in crisis-related police shootings between 1994 and 1995. The increase was associated with victim participant homicides or suicide by cop. Sergeant William Pettit visited the Memphis Police Department in 1988 to learn about a Crisis Intervention Team model. Sgt. Pettit was instructed about the Memphis program and implemented elements in order to create a CIT program within the Albuquerque Police Department.

Albuquerque was hit again with community tragedies involving law enforcement interaction with people living with a mental illness that sparked an investigation by the Department of Justice (DOJ) in 2014. The community voiced their concerns and the investigation by the DOJ also noted, "fatal confrontations with individuals experiencing mental health crises continue to cause significant public concern over the department's ability and willingness to consider the safety and well-being of the individuals in distress." The finding letter also stated, "A significant amount of the force we reviewed was used against persons with mental illness and in crisis." During this investigation the shooting of James Boyd occurred.

The findings letter and the community's outcry led to a court-appointed settlement agreement with the Department of Justice. The settlement agreement determined that all officers will be trained in CIT and that 40% of field officers will receive additional specialized training in interactions with people experiencing a crisis. The agreement also stated that the department's full-time crisis intervention unit would be staffed with 12 full-time detectives.

=== Canada ===
Some cities in Canada have implemented Crisis Intervention Teams based on three models. The Mobile Crisis Intervention Team (MCIT) model pairs a police officer with a nurse and responds to calls after first-responders have rendered or as first-responders render the scene safe. The Mobile Crisis Rapid Response Team (RRT) model responds directly to calls relating to people in crisis. The Crisis Outreach and Support Team (COAST) model sends teams by appointment through a hotline and often provides social services. Cities in Canada vary on which models they choose to implement.

==== Toronto ====
The Toronto Police Service MCIT has existed since the year 2000. However, the MCIT unit received significant attention after the shooting death of immigrant, Sammy Yatim, when a Toronto police officer intervened aggressively against Yatim, who was holding a knife aboard a streetcar. The expansion of the MCIT unit was recommended in a subsequent coroner's inquest into police shootings of suspects with edged weapons. Toronto Police MCIT teams are composed of mental health nurses from various local hospitals paired with a police officer. The team responds to calls as secondary responders.

==== Montreal ====
The Service de police de la Ville de Montréal (SPVM) operates police “co-response” teams that pair police officers with non-police personnel such as social workers or mental health workers. the SPVM maintained eight major co-response teams, including five added since the summer of 2020. One such team, ESUP, was created in 2013 following four police killings of people experiencing a mental health crisis over the preceding two years. An analysis of the coroner reports that followed these deaths found that most recommendations were not implemented, except for the introduction of tasers and co-response teams. The impact of these teams has been described as inconclusive, with police figures suggesting they are present in about 6% of crisis calls. A local case study has described these co-response teams as a public relations strategy to avoid implementing structural reforms in policing and health care.

==== Hamilton ====
The Hamilton Police Service is the first police service in Canada to implement all three models of crisis intervention programs. The Crisis Response Unit implements the MCIT and MCRRT models as the Mobile Rapid Response Team, while the COAST model is implemented by the COAST and Social Navigator teams. It is claimed that following the implementation of the COAST program, arrest rates for persons in crisis fell from 66% to 25% and on average, police officers saved 580 hours per year.

==== Vancouver ====
The Vancouver Police Department has implemented the MCIT model using Car 87 since 1978. The COAST model is implemented through both the Assertive Community Treatment Team (ACT) and the Assertive Outreach Team (AOT). The ACT is composed primarily of mental health professionals and provides social services for patients with high-risk or long-term mental health issues. The AOT provides support to patients with mental health issues as they leave detention in a hospital or jail.

== See also ==
- Mental health first aid, training for nonspecialists to assist those experiencing a mental health condition
- Mobile Crisis, first responder service providing mental health evaluations, de-escalation, and referral to other services
- Wellness check, a visit by police to someone whose well-being is in doubt
