= Mobile Crisis =

Emergency mental health service

Mobile Crisis, or Mobile Crisis Teams (MCT), Crisis Assessment and Treatment Teams or other terms are an emergency mental health service in at least Australia, the United States, and Canada, and are typically operated by a hospital or community mental health agency. They serve the community by providing emergency services to people in crisis, such as mental health evaluations, de-escalation, and/or pointers to local services (including potentially a ride). Evaluations are requested by hospital emergency rooms, ICUs, CCUs, jails, nursing homes, police, or EMS. These services are often available 24 hours a day. As of 2023, in parts of the US and Canada teams can be called via the new suicide & crisis hotline 988 and some other crisis hotlines.

Mobile Crisis Teams can be requested by someone in distress, or by anyone who is concerned that someone might harm themselves or someone else, based on their words and/or actions. Support may be requested due to a person exhibiting signs of psychosis, grave disability, or altered mental status believed not to have an organic cause.

Criteria for sending Mobile Crisis Teams can vary across mental health agencies and legal jurisdictions. An assessment may be requested for situations involving alcohol and drugs (where there is not a mental health component), or "routine" evaluations requested where there is not a reasonable expectation of harm to the client or another individual, as long as psychopathology is not otherwise ruled out.

== Evaluations ==
A Mobile Crisis clinician performing a formal evaluation has typically obtained her/his Master's degree in a mental health-related field (such as social work, mental health counseling, or counseling psychology). The clinician performs the evaluation based on standard models of mental status examination (alert and oriented, mood, thought process, affect, etc.), and assigns a DSM-5 (Diagnostic and Statistical Manual of the American Psychiatric Association, Fifth Edition) diagnosis if this falls within their scope of practice. After completing the evaluation, the clinician makes a disposition, or placement, decision for the client. Placements can include involuntary inpatient hospitalization, voluntary inpatient hospitalization, or discharge to home with outpatient referrals. Following disposition, the Mobile Crisis Team can be expected to follow up with the client within a few days.

== Other services ==
Many Mobile Crisis Teams also offer services such as de-escalation, some very basic health care, homeless street outreach including things as simple as some water or a blanket, and pointers to a wide array of relevant services for people in crisis — including possibly a ride. Many of these elements were pioneered beginning in 1989 in Eugene, Oregon by CAHOOTS.

== Australia ==
Australia's Crisis Assessment and Treatment Teams were pioneered in the state of Victoria, starting in the late 2000s.

== United States ==
=== Growth and spread in the 2020s ===
On June 1, 2020, Denver's Support Team Assisted Response (STAR) was launched. After the George Floyd protests, several hundred cities in the US interested in implementing similar programs requested information from CAHOOTS, STAR, and related programs.

In 2021, the US enacted legislation to cover 85% of the first three years' expenses for starting & operating mobile crisis teams, directing $1 billion to the effort. In December, Behavioral Crisis Response began service in Minneapolis, Minnesota.

In 2022, many more such programs started up and expanded. For example, Harris County, TX developed Holistic Assistance Response Teams (HART) that dispatch to behavioral and mental health crises, homelessness, and other non-emergencies.

In 2022, Oregon became the first state to qualify for the federal funding passed in 2021.

By 2024, most US states had multiple cities with unarmed emergency crisis-response teams or even had them available statewide.

== Examples ==
Some notable non-police mobile crisis response teams in the United States include:

- Denver, Colorado - Support Team Assistance Response (STAR)
- Eugene, Oregon - Crisis Assistance Helping Out On The Streets (CAHOOTS)
- Harris County, Texas - Holistic Assistance Response Teams (HART)
- Minneapolis, Minnesota - Behavioral Crisis Response (BCR)
- Portland, Oregon - Portland Street Response (PSR)
- Albuquerque, New Mexico - Albuquerque Community Safety Department (ACS)

== See also ==
- Homeless street outreach
- Mental health first aid, training for nonspecialists to assist those experiencing a mental health condition
- Police crisis intervention team, mobile crisis teams involving police officers
