= Warning signs of suicide =

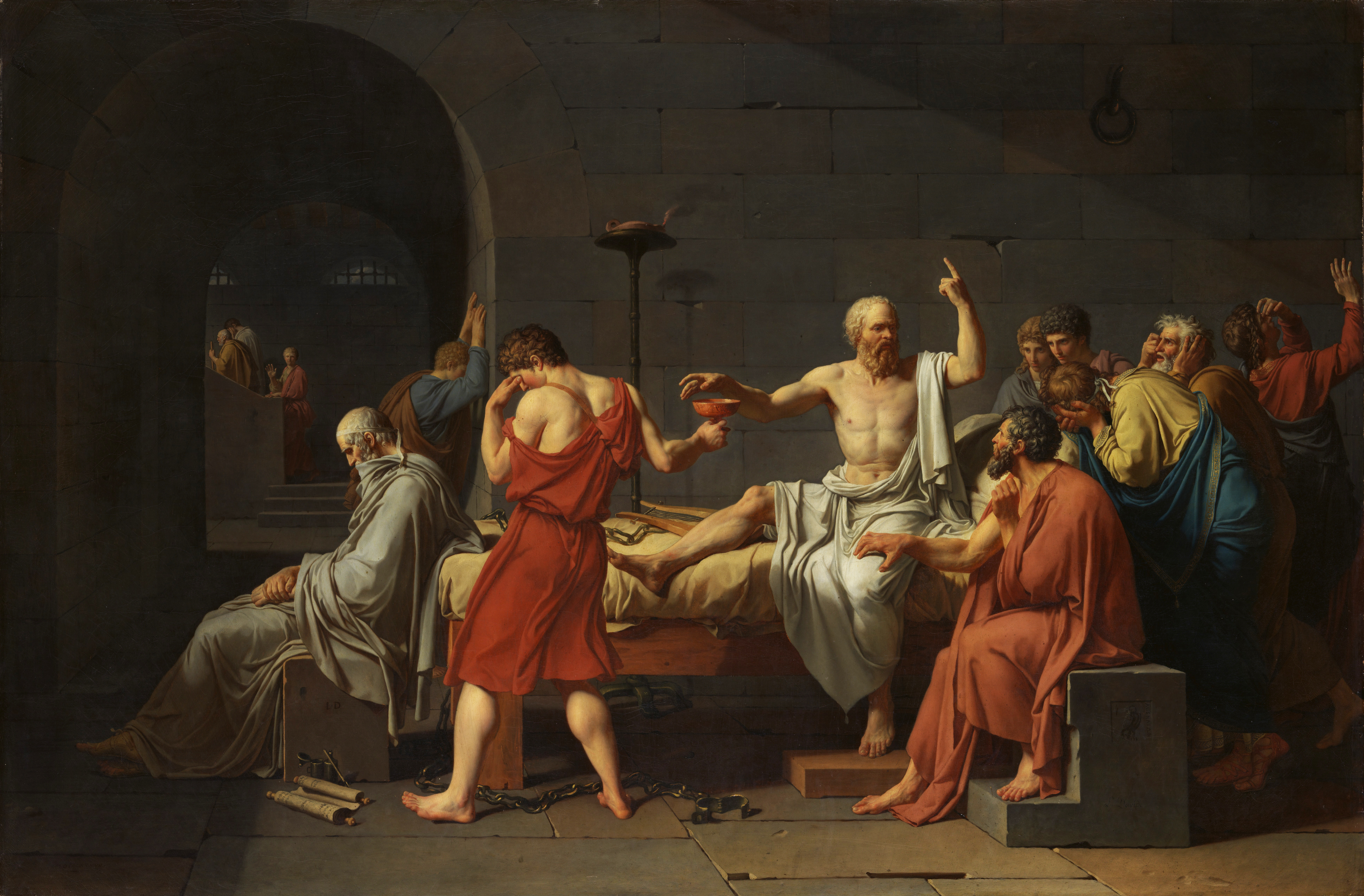
Drinking the hemlock in The Death of Socrates, by Jacques-Louis David (1787).

The warning signs of suicide have been noted by groups which have analyzed or studied cases to determine predictors of suicidal actions.

== Factors associated with suicide ==
Certain factors are known to be associated with increased risk of suicide, which may fall into one of three categories – individual, socio-cultural and situational.

There are several unusual or related actions which have been associated as predictors of suicidal feelings, including (but not limited to):

- previous suicide attempts (biggest risk factor, 80% tried it before);
- mentioning suicide plans; in the majority of cases, people have voiced their intent before killing themselves;
- acquiring the means, such as a firearm (gun), rope, poison or stockpiling pills;
- preoccupation with death in conversations;
- giving away valuable items or favorite prized possessions on impulse;
- recent neglect of their appearance and hygiene;
- cleaning and tidying a room far more than usual;
- morosely sad, depressed, hopeless or lacking energy;
- rage, uncontrolled anger, or seeking revenge;
- increased use of alcohol or drug abuse;
- too much sleep or too little; insomnia;
- difficulty with eating;
- sudden lift in spirits or happiness;
- withdrawing from friends, family and prior interests;
- dramatic change in dress or personal activities;
- rewriting a will, or farewell letters, or visiting to say goodbye;
- apologizing to others for various past actions;
- taking deadly risks such as driving extremely fast or running red lights;
- absenteeism or poorer performance at work or school;
- actions or words of hopelessness, intense anger, or unexplained happiness.

Although not every case has shown those warning signs, a large percentage of cases have included some of them.

=== Observing factors associated with suicide ===
Suicide warning signs include both actions and spoken words of hopelessness, intense anger, or unexplained late happiness, which can reveal an ominous pattern.

However, some signs might seem too subtle to an untrained observer who has only limited contact with the person, such as changes in clothing or withdrawing from friends or prior interests.

== See also ==
- Crisis intervention
- Existential crisis
- Mental health first aid
- Psychological first aid
- Suicide prevention
