= Homeless street outreach =

The concept of street outreach to individuals that are experiencing homelessness is a classic example of a form of outreach. Those who experience homelessness have a variety of complex issues that incite the need for specific forms of care. As such, street outreach is challenging work. There are multiple governmental and non-governmental agencies that have sought to engage in this work because of the understanding that unhoused people tend to have increased barriers to access traditional services. Street outreach comes in different forms, from people walking around carrying supplies or offering resources, to mobile health clinics with teams of medical volunteers driving around and offering services. Regardless of its form, the essence of street outreach is the desire to meet people where they are at, build deep trust and connections, offer support, and reinforce the human dignity and respect that is deserving of all people. The core elements of effective street outreach include being systematic, coordinated, comprehensive, housing-focused, person-centered, trauma-informed and culturally responsive, as well as emphasizing safety and reducing harm.

== Goals of outreach ==
The purpose of street outreach is heavily debated. Most agree that outreach serves a vital function, filling in a gap in access to services and helping those who face heightened barriers to care. However, proponents of outreach argue whether it is better to emphasize process (outreach as seeking to establish a personal connection that provides the spark for the journey back to a vital and dignified life) or to emphasize goals (meeting individuals on the street to increase their access to services). Outreach is not intended to be a one-size-fits-all answer to homelessness, as the population of people who are unhoused is very multifaceted in their needs and backgrounds and the majority of outreach programs face significant limitations. A lingering concern in the field of street outreach to unhoused is whether "downstream" service work outweighs the need for "upstream" advocacy work.

=== Housing ===
Volunteers and government workers who work to provide housing through street outreach oftentimes operate under the Housing First Model, which became prominent in the United States after 2010. This model prioritizes getting individuals their basic needs before all else, alleviating their critical needs for things like food and shelter first before attending to secondary needs such as finding a source of income or attending to substance abuse issues. Although this model has been criticized as a "housing only" model, meaning that in some cases individuals are not provided with enough support or resources once they are housed, it is generally regarded as an effective solution to homelessness. Going hand in hand with street outreach is the Housing First Model. It is often the state provision towards homeless street outreach because it gives tangible results, gets people off the streets, and is overall beneficial for a city's economy. Government officials that perform street outreach with the Housing First Model in mind can sometimes be faced with backlash because these outreach services can be seen as a way for the government to expand control over a previously hard to govern group, or a method by which unhoused community members are pushed out of sight for the benefit of their housed counterparts.

Barriers to effective outreach in regards to providing housing for unhoused individuals come from limited housing options, local pushback from housed individuals, or mistrust between unhoused individuals and outreach workers. The Housing First model only works when outreach workers are able to redirect homeless individuals to adequate housing resources. When shelters are at capacity and supportive housing units are full, outreach workers cannot move individuals experiencing homelessness into housing. When creating new housing developments that cater towards the unhoused community, these developments are oftentimes met with pushback from local authorities or housed neighborhoods that harbor NIMBY sentiments. Another potential barrier is created by a sense of mistrust between unhoused individuals and governmental agencies and partners like outreach workers. Some unhoused individuals reject services and resources provided by outreach workers and are labeled as care-avoidant or shelter-resistant as a result. Typically this demographic of people reject help because they either view these services as ineffective or no longer trust a system that has failed them in the past.

=== Providing social services ===
Social services are an essential part of outreach work in any city. Outreach workers in this sector are responsible for connecting individuals to physical and mental health resources as well as drug and alcohol counseling. Typically, these services are provided by trained professionals such as clinicians, case managers, and social work specialists. This kind of outreach involves an element of physical and moral danger for the outreach worker, as the traditional boundaries between clinician and patient do not exist in this domain. There is potential for outreach workers in this domain to put their own wellbeing at risk in order to help those who in some cases may not adhere to the help they are given. The role of the outreach worker can become uncertain in this practice—although outreach workers are supposed to be advocates, in this situation there is an inherent power dynamic that positions the outreach worker as the role of the gatekeeper, which allows them to wield the power over the unhoused individual to provide them with certain services.

Several homeless street outreach programs focus on providing specialized mental health services, harm reduction, or health services in response to the lack of public services that effectively address these needs. Due to the intersectionality of issues that contribute to homelessness, some organizations have developed outreach that allows services to be offered concurrently for individuals who belong to more than one category.

Issues surrounding territory, respect, and understanding regarding the homes of the unsheltered when engaging in homeless service outreach is often a factor that is considered by outreach workers, especially for those concerned with providing social services. Volunteers aim to affirm the territories of those that are unsheltered by acts of respect for privacy (including asking for permission to enter a person's space, knocking on the frame of the tent to notify residents about potentially entering the homes of the unsheltered). The right approach in terms of the location and timing of street outreach, the people included on the team, and verbal and nonverbal first impressions can make the difference for individuals hesitant to access social services. Instead of coming from a place of governance and regulation that often results of Housing First centered street outreach, community outreach by volunteers are often focused on giving dignity and respect to the unhoused.

When conducting service-based outreach, it is important to be aware of individuals who do not wish to seek services or may be distrustful of offers of help. For example, in harm reduction outreach, the opioid epidemic and alarming increase in accidental overdoses from substances laced with fentanyl has led to a strong negative outlook on the "fentanyl problem" and may stigmatize individuals who use fentanyl recreationally.

== Limitations ==
There are many limitations of street outreach to the homeless. Outreach fails to address the impacts of education, income, and other social determinants of health that would allow long term improvements in health and housing insecurity. As such, it is difficult to refer to outreach as a concrete solution to homelessness. In some regards, homeless street outreach merely acts as a bridge or stepping stone to fixed site services that can provide greater support and continuity of care.

A survey of unhoused individuals who engaged with services revealed that there is "improvement in general health, mental health, vitality after street outreach contacts, but only for those who later attended fixed site clinics (<50% of people)." Outreach programs that remain knowledgeable of existing fixed site spaces or are integrated in networks of service organizations are better able to coordinate access to care.

Consistent contact between outreach workers and the homeless population is challenging. Many homeless people find themselves having to move around constantly, presenting an obstacle to long-term programs and solutions. Due to this, street outreach is often referred to as dynamic, and not routine. In an interview with a street outreach worker in Brazil, it was said that "This wandering life of the homeless makes us look for people and never find them." Follow up with sick clients becomes nearly impossible, making continued care out of reach.

Additionally, due to the tendency for outreach organizations to be nonprofit and grassroots based, a significant limitation for outreach services is their reliance on volunteers' time and capacity and donor funding to continue to work with unhoused people. A barrier to widespread expansion of outreach services is the lack of awareness of the needs fulfilled by outreach and the difficulty in quantitatively representing the impact of outreach on the lives of unhoused individuals.

The abundance of limitations and fluid nature of street outreach makes addressing long term solutions a challenge. As such, street outreach is often referred to as a "band aid" solution for homelessness.

== See also ==
- Homelessness in the San Francisco Bay Area
- Homelessness in the United States
- Housing First
- Mobile Crisis
