= Psychological first aid =

Medical practice

- Specialty: Psychology

Psychological first aid (PFA) is a technique designed to reduce the occurrence of post-traumatic stress disorder. It was developed by the National Child Traumatic Stress Network (NCTSN) and National Center for Post Traumatic Stress Disorder (NC-PTSD), a section of the United States Department of Veterans Affairs, in 2006. It has been endorsed and used by the International Federation of Red Cross and Red Crescent Societies, Community Emergency Response Team (CERT), the American Psychological Association (APA) and many others. It was developed in a two-day intensive collaboration, involving more than 25 disaster mental health researchers, an online survey of the first cohort that used PFA and repeated reviews of the draft.

== Definition ==
According to the NCTSN and NC-PTSD, psychological first aid is an evidence-informed modular approach for assisting people in the immediate aftermath of disaster and terrorism to reduce initial distress and to foster short and long-term adaptive functioning. It is used by non-mental health experts, such as responders and volunteers. Other characteristics include non-intrusive pragmatic care and assessing needs. PFA does not necessarily involve discussion of the traumatic event and avoids any activity associated with "debriefing" as that technique has been associated with increased rates of PTSD.

=== Components ===
- Protecting from further harm
- Opportunity to talk without pressure
- Active listening
- Compassion
- Addressing and acknowledging concerns
- Discussing coping strategies
- Social support
- Offer to return to talk
- Referral

== Framework ==
Psychological first aid is commonly described using the three-step model of Look, Listen, and Link. In practice, many organizations implement these principles through a more detailed set of eight core actions.

=== 3 Steps ===
The PFA three-step model provides a simple framework for identifying people in distress, understanding their needs, and helping them access appropriate support.

1. Look: Observe the situation and identify individuals who may require immediate support, protection, or assistance.
2. Listen: Approach people respectfully, assess their needs and concerns, and listen without pressure or judgement.
3. Link: Help people address immediate needs, access information, connect with loved ones, and obtain additional services where required.

=== 8 Core Actions ===
The PFA eight core actions provide a more detailed operational framework for delivering psychological first aid in emergency, disaster, and crisis settings.

1. Contact and engagement: Approach respectfully and offer help without pressure.
2. Safety and comfort: Reduce immediate danger, provide accurate information, and support physical and emotional comfort.
3. Stabilization: Help someone who is overwhelmed, disoriented, panicking, or unable to function.
4. Information gathering: Identify immediate needs, risks, concerns, losses, and available support.
5. Practical assistance: Help the person take realistic next steps toward solving urgent problems.
6. Connection with social supports: Reconnect people with family, friends, caregivers, community, or other trusted support.
7. Information on coping: Explain common stress reactions and simple ways to cope.
8. Linkage with collaborative services: Connect people with medical, mental health, social, safeguarding, spiritual, or community services when needed.

== History ==
Before PFA, there was a procedure known as debriefing. Debriefing was a necessary step in a commercially available training intended to reduce PTSD called "Critical Incident Stress Management" (CISM). It was intended to reduce the incidence of post traumatic stress disorder (PTSD) after a major disaster. PTSD is now widely known to be debilitating; sufferers experience avoidance, flashbacks, hyper-vigilance, and numbness. Debriefing procedures were made a requirement after a disaster, with a desire to prevent people from developing PTSD. The idea behind it was to promote emotional processing by encouraging recollection of the event. Debriefing has origins with the military, where sessions were intended to boost morale and reduce distress after a mission, however the US Department of Defense discontinued the practice in 2002 due to evidence indicating that the practice increased PTSD rates. Debriefing was done in a single session with seven stages: introduction, facts, thoughts and impressions, emotional reactions, normalization, planning for future, and disengagement.

Debriefing was found to be at best, ineffective, and at worst, harmful with some studies finding that PTSD rates actually increased as a result of debriefing. There are several theories as to why debriefing increased incidence of PTSD. First, those who were likely to develop PTSD were not helped by a single session. Second, being re-exposed too soon to the trauma could lead to retraumatization. Exposure therapy in cognitive behavioral therapy allows the person to adjust to the stimuli before slowly increasing severity. Debriefing did not allow for this. Also, normal distress was seen to be pathological after a debriefing and those who had been through a trauma thought they had a mental disorder because they were upset. Debriefing assumes that everyone reacts the same way to a trauma, and anyone who deviates from that path, is pathological. But there are many ways to cope with a trauma, especially so soon after it happens.

== Effectiveness ==
PFA seems to address many of the issues in debriefing. It is not compulsory and can be done in multiple sessions and links those who need more help to services. It deals with practical issues which are often more pressing and create stress. It also improves self-efficacy by letting people cope their own way. PFA has attempted to be culturally sensitive, but whether it is or not has not been shown. However, a drawback is the lack of empirical evidence. While it is based on research, it is not proven by research. A 2024 integrative review concluded that the substantial variation in PFA protocols limits the ability to reach scientific conclusions. Like the debriefing method, PFA has become widely popular without testing, however debriefing is linked to harmful outcomes whereas PFA specifically avoids debriefing.

== See also ==
- Mental health first aid
- First responder, a specialist who is among the first to arrive and provide assistance at the scene of an emergency
- Public health, organized efforts to prevent disease, prolong life and promote health in a population
- Warning signs of suicide
