= Mental health first aid =

Training for nonspecialists

- Specialty: Psychology

Mental health first aid is an extension of the concept of traditional first aid to cover mental health conditions. Mental health first aid is the first and immediate assistance given to any person experiencing or developing a mental health condition, such as depression or anxiety disorders, or experiencing a mental health crisis situation such as suicidal ideation or panic attack.

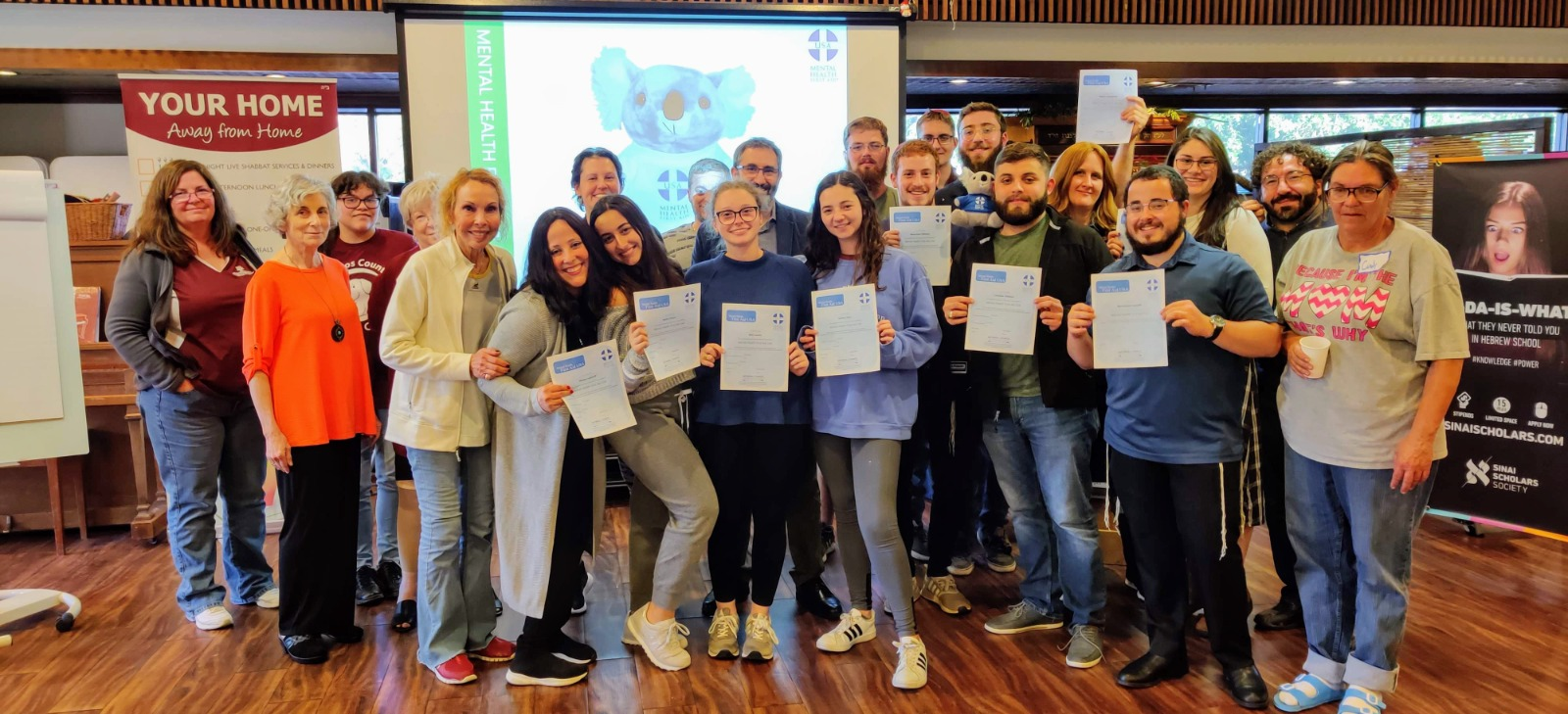
Mental health first aid training at Chabad at Texas A&M University

== Mental health first aid training ==
Mental health first aid training teaches members of the public how to help a person who is experiencing varying degrees of worsening mental health issues. Like traditional first aid training, mental health first aid training does not teach people to treat or diagnose mental health or substance use conditions. Instead, the training teaches people how to offer initial support until appropriate professional help is received or until the crisis resolves.

Mental health first aid training programs are provided by different organizations around the world, many of them non-profit. They have been implemented in countries such as the United States, Canada, the United Kingdom, Ireland, and a number of other European, Asian, and African countries.

=== History ===
==== Australia ====
The first mental health first aid training program was developed in Australia in 2001 by a research team led by Betty Kitchener and Anthony Jorm. The program was created to teach members of the general public how to provide initial support to people experiencing mental health problems, as well as to connect them with appropriate professional help and community resources. They tested the idea that giving first aid for mental health could lessen the effects of mental health problems, speed up recovery, and make suicide less likely by educating students on common mental health crises including feelings of suicide, deliberate self-harm, panic attacks, or symptoms of psychosis, and how to deal with these situations. The idea was to reduce the stigma associated with mental illness and make it more likely that people with mental health problems would seek help, which would reduce the risk of the person coming to harm.

==== United Kingdom ====
Mental health first aid training has been widely adopted within England; approximately half a million people have been through a training programme, which equates to approximately one in every 100 adults. In 2017, Mental Health First Aid England (MHFA England, or MHFAE) partnered with the UK government to create a £15 million programme which aimed to train one million individuals in basic mental health "first aid" skills. In 2023, a mental health first aid law was proposed in parliament. All England's Ofsted inspectors attended a mental health first aid briefing in January 2024. In 2025, MHFAE launched a public consultation on new workplace Mental Health First Aid standards.

Betty Kitchener's courses have also been adopted in Scotland.

=== Public reception ===
General media articles and videos indicate that mental health first aid training has political and celebrity proponents, such as former US president Barack Obama, former US first lady Michelle Obama, and singer/actress Lady Gaga.

A few bills of law have been proposed by politicians in countries such as Australia and the United Kingdom to make mental health first aid training compulsory in schools and other organizations. Although considered good practice in several countries, mental health first aid training is not legally imposed on organizations anywhere in the world.

=== Curriculum ===
The curriculum for mental health first aid training typically includes the following topics:

- Symptoms associated with common mental health conditions such as depression, anxiety, schizophrenia, bipolar disorder, and eating disorders, as well as a general overview of mental health and mental illnesses.
- Common warning signs of mental illnesses, such as mood, behavior, and cognitive changes.
- Information about local counseling and psychiatric services, and how to help others gain access to them.

Using the knowledge from those topics, participants are trained on a step-by-step action plan for providing mental health first aid, including how to:

1. Evaluate the risk of suicide or harm
2. Approach safely and appropriately
3. Listen non-judgmentally
4. Provide reassurance
5. Encourage appropriate professional assistance
6. Promote self-help
7. Additional support strategies

Depending on the program, there may be additional modules that target specific populations, such as children and adolescents, the elderly, or veterans. or conditions such as substance use disorder and its related issues and challenges. All of these topics are covered in order to develop participants' mental health literacy, which consists of the knowledge, skills, and confidence necessary to recognize and respond appropriately to signs of mental illness and substance use disorders.

=== Research on mental health first aid training ===
A number of systematic reviews and meta-analyses have been carried out to review data concerning the effectiveness of mental health first aid training on participants' knowledge of mental health conditions and subsequent helping behaviors.

A meta-analysis conducted in 2014 concluded that mental health first aid training increases participants' knowledge of mental health, reduces their negative views, and increases their supportive behaviors toward people with mental health issues.

A meta-analysis conducted in 2018 concluded that mental health first aid training enhances participants' knowledge, awareness, and beliefs about successful treatments for mental diseases. At follow-up, there were slight improvements in the amount of assistance provided to a person with a mental health problem, but the nature of the change in the offered behaviors was unclear.

A systematic review conducted in 2020 showed that mental health first aid training had conflicting effects on how trainees applied the skills they learned, but no influence on how beneficial their actions were for the mental health of the recipients.

A systematic review conducted in 2020 focused on youth and adolescent mental health first aid training and found significant improvements in the understanding, recognition, stigmatizing perceptions, helping motivations, and helping behavior of youth and adolescent participants. The most frequently stated improvement was in knowledge and confidence, while the least frequently reported improvement was in helping behavior.

As of 2024, the mental health first aid programme has been exported to over 25 countries and trained up over 6 million people worldwide, with over 1 million trained within Australia.

== See also ==
- Emotional First Aid
- First responder, a specialist who is among the first to arrive and provide assistance at the scene of an emergency
- Mental disorder
- Mental health triage: a brief overview of the Australian concept for dealing with psychiatric emergencies, similar to regular triage
- Mobile Crisis, first responder service providing mental health evaluations, de-escalation, and referral to other services
- Police crisis intervention team, American movement of partnerships between law enforcement and mental health services
- Psychological first aid
- Public health, organized efforts to prevent disease, prolong life and promote health in a population
- Warning signs of suicide
