= Out of the Past (1998 film) =

1998 American documentary film directed by Jeff Dupre

- DVD cover for Out of the Past
- Directed by: Jeff Dupre
- Screenplay by: Michelle Ferrari
- Produced by: Eliza Byard; Jeff Dupre; Michelle Ferrari
- Starring: Activists: Barbara Gittings; Jacob Orozco; Kelli Peterson; Voice cast: Leland Gantt; Cherry Jones; Gwyneth Paltrow; Edward Norton; Stephen Spinella
- Narrated by: Linda Hunt
- Cinematography: Buddy Squires
- Edited by: George O'Donnell; Toby Shimin
- Music by: Matthias Gohl
- Distributed by: Zeitgeist Films; Unapix Entertainment
- Release date: January 16, 1998 (Sundance)
- Running time: 64 minutes
- Country: United States
- Language: English

Out of the Past is a 1998 American documentary film directed by Jeff Dupre. The script was written by Michelle Ferrari. Dupre and Ferrari co-produced the film, along with Eliza Byard. It depicts the attempt to establish a gay–straight alliance club at East High School during the 1995-1996 school year which resulted in the Salt Lake City Board of Education banning all extracurricular clubs to prevent its creation. It compares the actions of Kelli Peterson with historical gay icons.

The film premiered at the 1998 Sundance Film Festival, where it won the Audience Award for Best Documentary. It also won the GLAAD Media Award for Outstanding Documentary at the 10th GLAAD Media Awards.

== Synopsis ==
Out of the Past tells the story of Kelli Peterson's involvement with the founding of a gay-straight alliance at Salt Lake City's East High School in the 1995-1996 school year. It is told in segments which are broken up by the inclusion of historical LGBTQ persons. Voice-overs are used to convey the historical segments, which begin with Michael Wigglesworth. Also featured are the Boston marriage of Sarah Orne Jewett and Annie Adams Fields; Henry Gerber and the founding of the Society for Human Rights; Bayard Rustin's organization of the March on Washington; and Barbara Gittings's activism.

Commentary from historians, as well as theologian Peter J. Gomes, are included in the historical sections to explain how the knowledge of these figures's lives has an effect on the modern understanding of these historical eras. After each historical segment, the story returns to footage with Peterson, including her testimony in front of the school board, interviews including her parents, and footage of the gay-straight alliance members. National media broadcasts regarding the school board's decision to ban all extracurricular clubs are also included.

== Background ==
During the 1995-1996 school year, Kelli Peterson and other students petitioned for the creation of a gay-straight alliance club at East High School. At the end of January 1996, Utah State Senators met in secret to determine how to legally stop the club, a meeting that State Senate President Lane Beattie admitted was illegal. During the meeting, senators viewed a homophobic propaganda video; afterward, they declared they would be willing to lose federal education funds to stop the gay-straight alliance.

Another option considered was passing State Senator Craig Taylor's Senate Bill 246, which he stated would prevent schools from advocating illegal actions. State Senator Charles Stewart suggested simply not accepting federal funding for Utah schools. The ACLU held a meeting of nearly 200 supporters in February, approximately a third of which were students, and provided postage-paid postcards for attendees to use in writing to Beattie and to Utah Governor Mike Leavitt in support of the club.

The Salt Lake City Board of Education held a hearing on February 20, 1996 to discuss their possible recourse to prevent the club without violating the Equal Access Act of 1984. Violating the Act would mean a potential loss of US$120,000,000 for all Utah public schools. The East High School Community Council had voted to allow the club so long as it complied with the same regulations as other clubs, while also adding a parental consent form for all extracurricular clubs as a requirement.

On February 21, Peterson led a rally of approximately 75 people, including the local PFLAG chapter. That evening, the Salt Lake City school board voted to ban all extracurricular clubs in a 4 to 3 vote, to take effect in the 1996–1997 school year. Over 500 people attended the meeting, including members of the Jordan School District Board of Education as well as Marion Snow, chairman of the Utah State Board of Education.

That Friday, February 23, two hundred West High students marched to the Utah State Capitol in protest of the decision, and six hundred students from East High walked out of classes. Lawyers also contradicted Utah Attorney General Jan Graham's advice, arguing that Westside Community Board of Education v. Mergens allowed clubs that would "advocate [...] conduct otherwise inconsistent with the shared values of a civilized social order" to be banned. Orrin Hatch was in the Capitol as the students protested outside, arguing that the Supreme Court of the United States would allow Utah to ban LGBTQ clubs so long as they also banned strictly heterosexual clubs.

The February 23 session of the Utah State Senate passed SB246 in a vote of 18 to 8. It later passed the Utah House of Representatives in a vote of 49 to 18, but Leavitt subsequently vetoed the bill, fearing a challenge on First Amendment grounds. The bill used extremely broad wording, and though the Utah Attorney General's office was not asked to review it, an official stated that it likely would fail a Constitutional challenge.

A one-day special session of the legislature was held on April 17, 1996, during which the Senate, with a vote of 21 to 7, and the House, with a vote of 47 to 21, passed a bill to ban LGBTQ clubs in schools. Leavitt signed the bill into law.

== Cast ==
In alphabetical order:

- George Chauncey, as self
- John D'Emilio, as self
- Lillian Faderman, as self
- Leland Gantt, voicing Bayard Rustin
- Barbara Gittings, as self
- Peter J. Gomes, as self
- Linda Hunt, as the narrator
- Cherry Jones, voicing Annie Adams Fields
- Edward Norton, voicing Henry Gerber
- Jacob Orozco, as self
- Gwyneth Paltrow, voicing Sarah Orne Jewett
- Kelli Peterson, as self
- Stephen Spinella, voicing Michael Wigglesworth

== Production ==
Out of the Past was directed and produced by Jeff Dupre, with Michelle Ferrari and Eliza Byard as co-producers. It was Dupre's first solo project, begun in 1995. Michelle Ferrari wrote the screenplay.

Dupre stated that one of his desires in making the film was to have it included in school curricula. The original script had been intended to be taught in U.S. history classrooms, prior to Peterson and the East High gay-straight alliance becoming a national news story.

Cinematographer Buddy Squires used 16 mm film to record the production. It was edited by George O'Donnell and Toby Shimin. Matthias Gohl composed the music.

== Themes ==
One of the themes expressed in Out of the Past is the equation of the Civil rights movement and the LGBTQ rights movement. It argues that there is a present need to continue advocating for equal rights. The film also advocates the reclamation of historical LGBTQ persons as a means of eliminating stereotypes, as well as acknowledging the importance of understanding history and how that enables the understanding of oneself. It also expresses how knowing LGBTQ history creates a point of reference for LGBTQ youth, and argues that exclusion of LGBTQ figures from history taught in U.S. classrooms has been deliberate.

== Release ==
Out of the Past premiered January 16, 1998 at the Sundance Film Festival. Initial distribution was handled through Zeitgeist Films, and it was later picked up for distribution by Unapix Films for theatrical release.

The documentary screened at FilmFest DC on May 1–2, 1998. It screened at the first Newport International Film Festival on June 3–4, at a special screening at the White House in mid-June, and at the Frameline Film Festival on June 22. It screened at Outfest LA on July 11, and at the Screening Room in Tribeca on July 31. It played at the Red Vic in San Francisco on August 26. The documentary played at the Tower Theatre in Salt Lake, as well as in Los Angeles at the Grande 4-Plex, in September. It screened at the Minneapolis LGBT Film Festival on October 3.

When playing in theaters, it was sometimes paired with the short film Dottie Gets Spanked.

Out of the Past aired on PBS in October 1998, and Dupre requested that viewers make VHS recordings of it to donate to their local schools. The film also aired on Sundance TV in June 1999.

== Home media ==
A-Pix released Out of the Past on VHS in October 1998. Wolfe Video served as a VHS distributor, as did Facets Multi-Media.

Ardustry Home Entertainment released a DVD version on April 26, 2005, with monaural sound. It is presented in full frame. The only reported special feature included is a chapter selection dividing the disc content into ten parts.

== Reception ==
=== Critical reception ===
Emanuel Levy, writing for Variety, approved of the method that Dupre used in telling the stories of historical figures interspersed with Peterson's story, calling it "original and evocative." While Levy found the issue at East High and the Utah Legislature's subsequent reaction "interesting," he was more intrigued by the other persons included, stating that they give the film a "greater socio-historical significance." Levy also approved of the archival footage used, as well as the value of the production overall. Cara Mertes, writing for the International Documentary Association, also praised Dupre's interweaving of the narratives, calling the film "enlightening" and noting that it demonstrates the elements needed "to overcome prejudice and hatred."

Jan Stuart, writing for The Advocate, was impressed overall with the juxtaposition of Peterson's story and those of the selected historical persons. Stuart approved of the little-known figures chosen, stating that they underscore the fact that LGBTQ persons have long sought and fought for equal rights. Stuart was impressed with the voice-over cast, and called Linda Hunt's narration "elegant." Stuart also commented that the meeting between Peterson and Gittings seemed "awkward."

Jeff Vice, writing for the Deseret News, rated the film with two stars, stating that the inclusion of the historical figures's stories overshadowed Peterson. Vice also called them "superficial life sketches," and stated that all of the voice acting was "emotionless" with "nondescript narration." In contrast, Robert Julian, reviewing for the Bay Area Reporter, praised Ferrari's script, stating that the stories are presented in a way that engages the viewer. Julian was also impressed with Dupre's direction and how both Dupre and Ferrari kept an "even tone," conveying the stories without "posturing" or turning the documentary into a screed.

Colin Covert, writing for The Minnesota Star Tribune, stated that the documentary felt like "a politically correct history lesson" but also found the method of intertwining the stories to be "engaging." Stephen Holden, writing for The New York Times, said it was "efficiently edited," calling the biographies of historical figures "concise." G. Allen Johnson, writing for the San Francisco Chronicle, on the other hand, commented that the brevity of the sections on the historical persons led to them being perceived as icons rather than people. Johnson stated that those portions disrupted the "pacing and energy" established with the segments involving Peterson. Johnson found those parts "compelling."

Krissy Smallwood, writing for Goucher College's The Quindecem, noted that the film intends everyone to be the audience, not only LGBTQ persons. Smallwood found it to be "powerful and moving," commenting on how it highlights the "positive impact" of LGBTQ persons throughout U.S. history. P. Van Vleck, reviewing for Video Librarian, stated that the documentary was "very polished and engaging," and approved of the way it contrasted the hidden past and the visible struggles of the modern era. Van Vleck rated it three of four stars. Lisanne Skyler, writing for the website Film Scouts, called it "richly layered" and commented that the way the film argues for the inclusion of LGBTQ figures in the teaching of American history is both "powerful" and highlights the "painful alienation" LGBTQ teens experience.

Gary Handman, writing for American Libraries, called the history presented "fascinating," commenting that Dupre using Peterson's story as framing brings the other figures's stories "out of the shadows." Doris Tourmarkine, writing for Film Journal International, stated that the documentary did have some "awkward shifts," and would struggle to gain attention, despite being "uplifting" and a "valuable document" of LGBTQ history with respect to acceptance.

Reviewing the DVD, Daniel Kelly of DVD Talk suggested that while the documentary's method of weaving historical figures into Peterson's story was interesting, he would probably have preferred that her story be told separately. Kelly felt that the section on Bayard Rustin was particularly important.

=== Audience reception ===
At Outfest LA, the screening was filled to capacity, and the audience gave it a standing ovation.

=== Accolades ===
Out of the Past was included on the short-list of sixteen documentaries competing for the Grand Jury prize at the 1998 Sundance festival. Though it did not receive that award, the film did receive the Audience Award for Best Documentary. It also received an Honorable Mention from the Outfest LA grand jury for Best Documentary Feature.

In 1999, it also received the GLAAD Media Award for Outstanding Documentary, and The Advocate included the film in a list of LGBTQ rights videos it considered essential. In 2005, Library Journal labeled the film as a public library core resource.

== See also ==
- 1998 in film

== Sources ==
- "FilmFest DC 1998: The Twelfth Annual Washington, DC International Film Festival" (PDF). FilmFest DC. 1998.
- "Gay alert, drop everything: Utah politics". The Economist. Vol. 339, no. 7963. April 27, 1996. p. 31. Gale A18232739.
- "GLAAD announces media award nominations". Pittsburgh Post-Gazette. Vol. 72, no. 174. January 21, 1999. p. D-2 – via Google Books.
- "New Video Releases". The New York Times. October 23, 1998. Gale A150127077.
- "Out of the Past". Gay Wired. n.d. Archived from the original on April 23, 2000.
- "Teen Activist Dead, Remembered". PlanetOut. n.d. Archived from the original on July 16, 2021.
- "Utah bans gay clubs in schools". The Hour. Vol. 125, no. 93. April 19, 1996. p. 29 – via Google Books.
- "Utah lawmakers OK bill to ban gay student clubs". Star-News. Vol. 129, no. 161. April 19, 1996. p. 2A – via Google Books.
- Brooke, James (February 28, 1996). "To Be Young, Gay and Going to High School in Utah". The New York Times. Archived from the original on April 4, 2019.
- Brown, Matthew (February 22, 1996). "Board bans gay club by banning all others, too". Record-Journal. Vol. 129, no. 52. Associated Press. pp. 1, 5 – via Google Books.
- Cortez, Marjorie (February 21, 1996). "Board votes to ban all non-curricular clubs". Deseret News. Vol. 146, no. 252. pp. A1–A2 – via Google Books.
- Cortez, Marjorie (February 7, 1996). "Divided they'll stand and speak on clubs when School Board holds public hearing". Deseret News. Vol. 146, no. 245. pp. A1-2 – via Google Books.
- Cortez, Marjorie (June 7, 1996). "East High graduates focus on appreciation and accomplishment". Deseret News. Vol. 146, no. 359. p. B11 – via Google Books.
- Cortez, Marjorie (February 29, 1996). "Lawmakers rally to rein in school gay clubs". Deseret News. Vol. 146, no. 260. p. A29 – via Google Books.
- Cortez, Marjorie; Dillon, Lucinda; Costanzo, Joe; Van Eyck, Zack; Funk, Marianne; Edwards, Alan; Donaldson, Amy; Spangler, Jerry; Bernick, Jr., Bob; Riley Roche, Lisa (February 23, 1996). "S.L. students walk out, march in protest". Deseret News. Vol. 146, no. 254. pp. A1–A2 – via Google Books.
- Costanzo, Joe (February 23, 1996). "Is it really all or nothing on clubs in schools?". Deseret News. Vol. 146, no. 254. pp. A1–A2 – via Google Books.
- Covert, Colin (October 2, 1998). "Festival is a cross section of gay cinema". The Minnesota Star Tribune. p. 22E. Gale A62566986.
- Cowan, Noah (Spring 1998). "Festival Roundup – Sundance Film Festival". Filmmaker.
- Cunha, Tom (July 20, 1998). "L.A.'s OutFest, Part I: Sex in L.A., "Out of the Past" and Ellen DeGeneres". IndieWire.
- DeVoy, Beverly (May 16, 1996). "Sponsor sought for gay/straight club". Deseret News.
- Edwards, Ian (January 1, 1998). "The Sundance Short-List". RealScreen. Archived from the original on August 11, 2020.
- Guthmann, Edward (June 14, 1998). "'The Parker Posey of Queer Cinema' / Stand-up comic Lea DeLaria is all over the lesbian and gay film festival". San Francisco Chronicle.
- Handman, Gary (June 2002). "Quick Vids". American Libraries. Vol. 33, no. 6. p. 120. JSTOR 25648357.
- Harris, Wesley (June 1999). "Gay and Lesbian Films". A&U: America's AIDS magazine. Vol. 8, no. 6. pp. 60, 62. JSTOR community.41884718.
- Henry, Jack (September 25, 2023). "Alumnus Highlight: Jeff Dupre". Xavier News. St. Xavier High School.
- Holden, Stephen (July 31, 1998). "FILM REVIEW; Finding Courage and Anguish Along the Road to Gay Pride". The New York Times. Gale A150173089.
- Jacobson, Harlan (January 25, 1998). "'Slam' locks up Sundance prize: D.C.-based prison film named top drama at Utah festival". The Washington Post.
- Jennings, Kevin (2006). Mama's Boy, Preacher's Son: A Memoir. Boston: Beacon Press. ISBN 0-8070-7146-3. LCCN 2006001275 – via Internet Archive.
- Johnson, G. Allen (August 26, 1998). "Gay teen club subject of film". San Francisco Chronicle.
- Julian, Robert (August 27, 1998). "Exposing ourselves: 'Out of the Past' documents gay heritage". Bay Area Reporter. Vol. 28, no. 35. p. 32 – via Internet Archive.
- Kelly, Daniel W. (April 27, 2005). "Out of the Past". DVD Talk. Archived from the original on August 11, 2022.
- Kinser, Jeremy (June 22, 1999). "Fast-Forward — And Back". The Advocate. pp. 34–8. Gale A54939056.
- Krach, Aaron (July 27, 1998). "Get Your VCRs Ready! Jeff Dupre Pushes "Out of The Past" from the Schoolhouse to the White House". IndieWire.
- Levy, Emanuel (February 9, 1998). "Out of the Past". Variety. Vol. 369, no. 13. p. 72. Gale A20520890.
- Lovinger, Robert (January 11, 2011) [May 31, 1998]. "Introducing the first Newport International Film Festival". South Coast Today.
- Mertes, Cara (January 5, 1998). "Sundance '98". International Documentary Association.
- Mitchell, Ruth Ann (February 10, 1996). "Backers of gay club marshal forces". Deseret News. Vol. 146, no. 241. p. B3 – via Google Books.
- Rabinowitz, Mark (July 21, 1998). "Outfest Wraps, Names Winners; Film Society Adds Members To NYFF Selection Committee". IndieWire.
- Rabinowitz, Mark (April 2, 1998). "Three Docs Snapped Up By Three Small Indie Distribs". IndieWire. Archived from the original on July 7, 2026.
- Reece, Mark L. (February 21, 1996). "75 rally, march in support of gay clubs". Deseret News. Vol. 146, no. 252. p. A1 – via Google Books.
- Sahagún, Louis (February 22, 1996). "Utah Board Bans All School Clubs in Anti-Gay Move". Los Angeles Times.
- Skyler, Lisanne (n.d.). "Out of the Past". Film Scouts. Archived from the original on September 1, 1999.
- Smallwood, Krissy (October 14, 1998). "Film: Out of the Past: Goucher Hosts Only Local Screening of Sundance Award Winning Documentary". The Quindecim. Vol. 85, no. 3. p. 9. JSTOR community.39383792.
- Spangler, Jerry (May 21, 1996). "Civil libertarians in Utah applaud top court's ruling". Deseret News. Vol. 146, no. 342. p. A3 – via Google Books.
- Spangler, Jerry; Bernick, Jr., Bob (February 7, 1996). "Lawmakers accused of gay-bashing". Deseret News. Vol. 146, no. 245. pp. A1-2 – via Google Books.
- Spangler, Jerry (April 25, 1996). "Leavitt is likely to sign 'disappointing' club bill". Deseret News. Vol. 146, no. 316. p. B16 – via Google Books.
- Spangler, Jerry (February 10, 1996). "Leavitt joins growing chorus against a gay club at East". Deseret News. Vol. 146, no. 241. p. B3 – via Google Books.
- Spangler, Jerry (February 23, 1996). "Senate OKs limit on teachers' activities". Deseret News. Vol. 146, no. 254. p. A2 – via Google Books.
- Stilp, Ben; Renna, Cathy (May 9, 1999). "10th Annual GLAAD Media Awards come to a record-breaking close in Washington, DC". QRD (Press release). Archived from the original on September 25, 2004.
- Stuart, Jan (September 1, 1998). "Out of the Past". The Advocate. No. 767. pp. 47–8. Gale A21148321.
- Swensen, Jason (February 26, 1996). "S.L. school board meets privately to 'self-evaluate'". Deseret News. Vol. 146, no. 257. pp. B1, B4 – via Google Books.
- Thomas, Kevin (September 10, 1998). "The Return of 'Exodus'". Los Angeles Times.
- Tourmarkine, Doris (November 2, 2004). "Out of the Past". Film Journal International. Archived from the original on November 30, 2017.
- Tull, Alan C. (May 13, 1996). "To end bigotry, deeds are needed". Deseret News. Vol. 146, no. 334. p. A9 – via Google Books.
- Van Buskirk, Jim (April 1, 2005). "Videos". Library Journal. Vol. 130, no. 6. p. 65. Gale A131608629.
- Van Vleck, P. (November 11, 1998). "Out of the Past: The Struggle for Gay & Lesbian Rights in America". Video Librarian. Archived from the original on March 6, 2026.
- Vice, Jeff (September 25, 1998). "'Out of the Past' off mark in trying to tell gays' story". Deseret News. Vol. 148, no. 103. p. W13 – via Google Books.
- Wermcrantz, Liz (November 1998). "Video". Feminist Bookstore News. Vol. 21, no. 4. p. 40. JSTOR community.28036387.
