= White heron =

White heron may refer to:

- Great egret, (Ardea alba), also known as the great white egret, common egret or white heron
- Eastern great egret (Ardea alba modesta)
- "A White Heron", a short story by Sarah Orne Jewett
