= A Country Doctor (novel) =

1884 novel by Sarah Orne Jewett

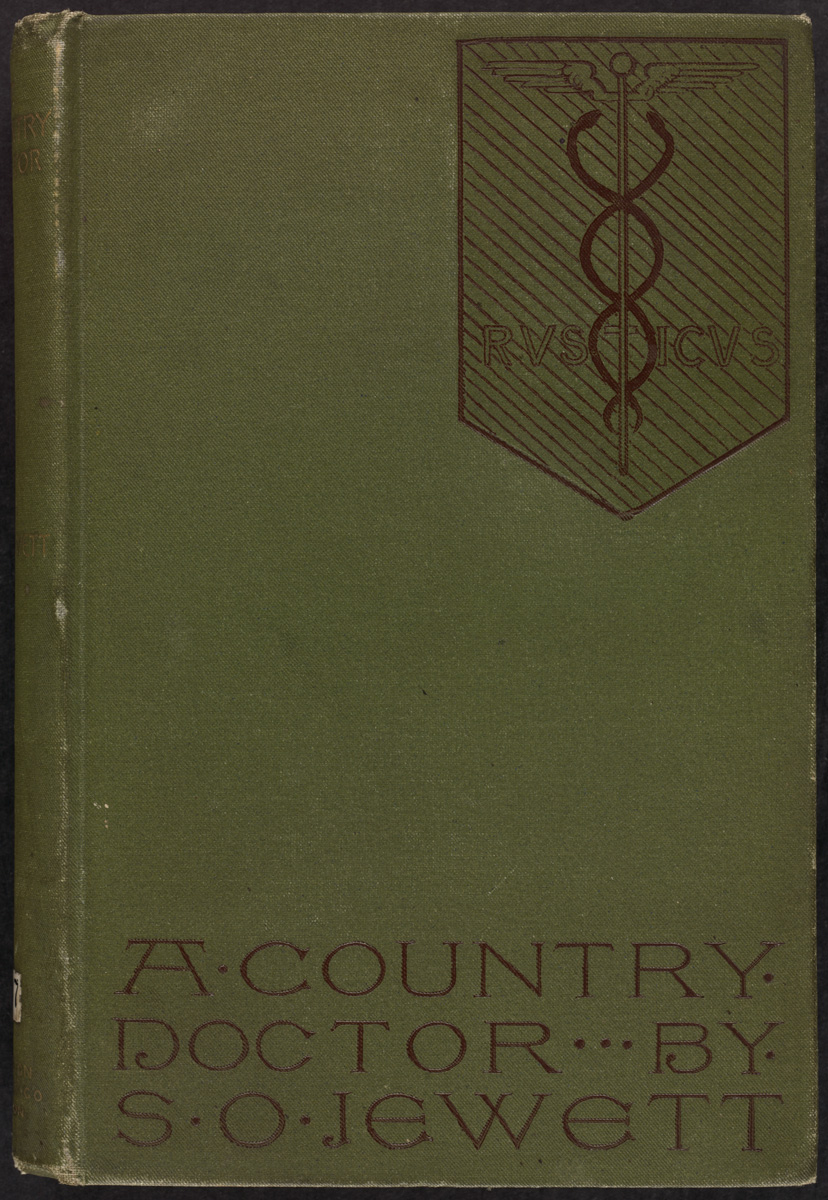
- Author: Sarah Orne Jewett
- Language: English
- Publication date: 1884
- Publication place: United States

A Country Doctor is a novel by American author Sarah Orne Jewett. The book, which was first published in 1884, was based on the relationship between Jewett and her physician father.

== Plot summary ==
The main character of A Country Doctor is Nan Prince. Nan is the ward of physician Dr. Leslie Prince and wishes to follow him into a medical career; however, when she starts her medical studies, she realises that she will have to choose between her career, and marriage and society's expectations of her. The novel follows Nan as she encounters strife when she decides to go against the traditional values of the day and become a doctor.

== Analysis ==
The work has been compared to Elizabeth Stuart Phelps Ward's Doctor Zay, which also depicted a woman seeking a medical career in the late 1800s.

The book has been listed as an example of the shift in the perception of the role of women in society, with the main character of Nan choosing to pursue her career in medicine rather than a marriage and family.

Themes addressed in A Country Doctor include the difficulty of meshing together the past and the future. The role of women in society, the eschewing of traditional roles and gender conventions, and whether or not it is possible for a woman to choose both a family and a career is also brought up as a theme in the novel. There is also reference within the book to the idea that "all people, regardless of sex, receive individual vocational calls".
