= The Affair (1995 film) =

- DVD cover
- Genre: Drama; Romance
- Screenplay by: Pablo Fenjves; Bryan Goluboff
- Story by: Pablo Fenjves; Walter Bernstein
- Directed by: Paul Seed
- Starring: Courtney B. Vance; Kerry Fox; Leland Gantt; Beatie Edney; Ciarán Hinds; Bill Nunn; Ned Beatty
- Music by: Christopher Gunning
- Country of origin: United States
- Original language: English

Production
- Executive producers: Harry Belafonte; Colin Callender
- Producers: John Smithson; David M. Thompson
- Cinematography: Ivan Strasburg
- Editor: John Stothart
- Running time: 101 minutes
- Production companies: Black Tuesday Films; HBO Pictures

Original release
- Network: HBO
- Release: October 14, 1995

The Affair is a 1995 American romantic drama television film directed by Paul Seed and starring Courtney B. Vance as an African-American soldier in the United States Army who is deployed to England during World War II and has an affair with a British officer's wife, played by Kerry Fox. The film premiered on HBO on October 14, 1995.

== Cast ==
- Courtney B. Vance as Travis Holloway
- Kerry Fox as Maggie Leyland
- Ciarán Hinds as Edward Leyland
- Leland Gantt as Barrett
- Ned Beatty as Colonel Banning
- Bill Nunn as Sergeant Rivers
- Beatie Edney as Esther
- Fraser James as Sonny
- Adrian Lester as Ray
- Rory Jennings as David Leyland
- Nicholas Selby as Mr. Leyland
- Anna Cropper as Mrs. Leyland
- Rolf Saxon as Captain Marks
- Todd Boyce as Captain Carlson

== Production ==
Many extras from the film were American Soldiers stationed at RAF Lakenheath and RAF Mildenhall, including AFJROTC from Lakenheath AHS.

== Broadcast ==
The Affair aired on HBO on October 14, 1995. It was also broadcast on BBC One on December 3 of the same year.
