= Leland Gantt =

American actor and writer

- Born: McKeesport, Pennsylvania, U.S.
- Education: Point Park College (BA)
- Occupations: Actor, writer

Leland Gantt is an American actor and writer known for his roles in various television series and films. Gantt is also a theatre actor, and has appeared in a one-man show, Rhapsody in Black.

== Early life and education ==
Gantt was born and raised in McKeesport, Pennsylvania. After graduating from McKeesport Area High School, he attended the Indiana University of Pennsylvania before earning a Bachelor of Arts degree from Point Park College. After struggling with drug and alcohol addiction, Gantt was inspired to pursue acting by a theatre teacher and moved to New York City in 1983.

== Career ==
After moving to New York, Gantt appeared in Broadway productions of Ma Rainey's Black Bottom, Fences, Richard III, Crumbs from the Table of Joy, Gem of the Ocean, Judas Iscariot, and The Fall of Heaven. In 1991, Gantt was nominated for the Drama Desk Award for Outstanding Featured Actor in a Play for his performance in Let Me Live, losing to Kevin Spacey.

Gantt has also appeared in episodes of Law & Order and JAG. He portrayed Martin Luther King Jr. in the 1987 miniseries Hoover vs. The Kennedys. He also starred in The Affair.

== Filmography ==
=== Film ===
Year	Title	Role	Notes
1985	Rockin' Road Trip	Curtis Smith	
1990	Presumed Innocent	Leon Wells	
1991	The Super	Male Tenant	
1992	Malcolm X	Wilbur Kinley	
1998	Pants on Fire	Allen	
1998	Out of the Past	Bayard Rustin	Documentary; voice
2000	Requiem for a Dream	Ward Attendant Penn	
2008	Miracle at St. Anna	Livingston	
2020	Another Year Together	Keith	

=== Television ===
Year	Title	Role	Notes
1987	Hoover vs. The Kennedys	Martin Luther King Jr.	2 episodes
1993, 2001	Law & Order	FBI Agent Jeff Washington / Jonas 'Skate' Stark	2 episodes
1995	New York Undercover	Jerome Willard	Episode: "All in the Family"
1995	The Affair	Barrett	Television film
1995	JAG	Briefing Officer	Episode: "Scimitar"
2003	Law & Order: Special Victims Unit	Stew Matos	Episode: "Fallacy"
2018	Titans	Thurman	Episode: "Atlas Shrugged"
2019	The Good Fight	Partner Thomas	Episode: "The One with the Celebrity Divorce"
