= The Life of Nancy =

1895 short story collection by Sarah Orne Jewett

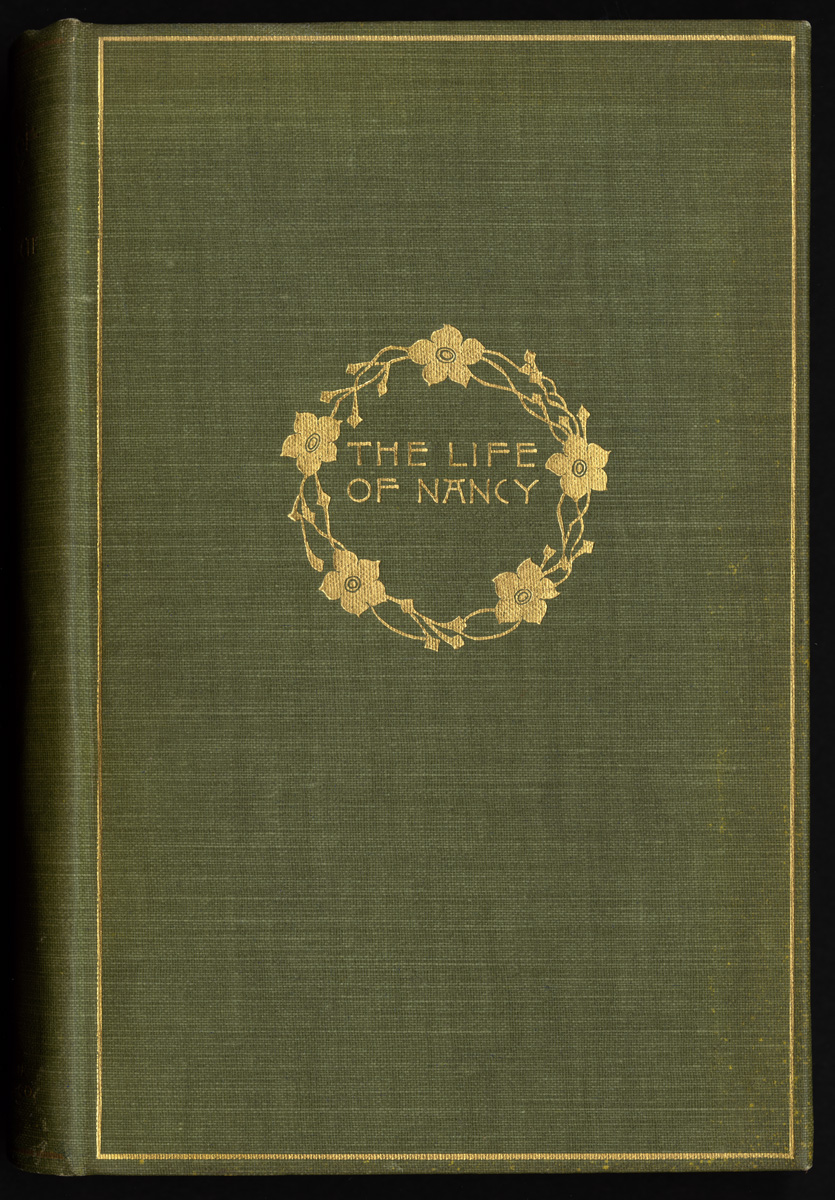
The Life of Nancy, 1895

The Life of Nancy (1895) is a collection of eleven short stories by Sarah Orne Jewett. Following in the tradition of "local color" fiction, Jewett's stories are defined by their detailed descriptions of all aspects of everyday life in the country locales and fishing-towns in which the stories are set. Despite the lack of relation between the characters in each story, a common theme runs through the collection: nostalgia for the past and/or a need for revival of tradition.

== Publishing history ==
- The Life of Nancy was first published in The Atlantic in February 1895. It was later collected and published as a book, entitled The Life of Nancy, by Houghton-Mifflin in 1895.
- "The Life of Nancy" (short story within the collection) was published as an article in The Nation on February 27, 1896.
- "Fame’s Little Day" was published in Harper's Magazine, March 1895.
- "A War Debt" was published in Harper’s Magazine in January 1895.
- "The Hilton’s Holiday" was published in The Century Magazine in September 1893
- "The Guests of Mrs. Timms" was published in The Century Magazine in February 1894.
- "A Neighbor’s Landmark" was published in The Century Magazine in December 1894.
- "All My Sad Captains" was published in The Century Magazine in September 1895.

== Critical reception ==
The title story of this collection of ten tales might well stand as a representative title for a very large part of Miss Jewett's work. She has done precisely this, -- got at the life of "Nancy," the homely New England maiden whose city sister is "Annie;" not at the mere external circumstance of Nancy, but at her life, what she thinks about, dreams about, knows in her soul; not, again, at some sharp moment in Nancy's experience, some acidulous drop into which her life has been distilled, but at her common experience as it flows on year after year.

— "Comment on New Books", Atlantic Monthly 77 (February 1896): 279

On its release, The Life of Nancy was extremely well received. It drew positive reviews in numerous journals, papers and magazines including The Nation, The Atlantic, The Atlantic Monthly, The Daily Picayune, and The Chautauquan. In The Atlantic Monthly, Horace Scudder wrote: "Miss Jewett never quite parts with that air of fine breeding which gives grace and beauty to her work, and makes her characters the objects of a compassion born of fuller knowledge than they possess of themselves."

== Plot summaries and character descriptions ==
=== "The Life of Nancy" ===
- Characters

Tom Aldis: He was raised in Boston by wealthy parents. He has a worldly perspective and travels to Europe for extended periods of time with his wife and children. He is the male protagonist of this story.

Nancy Gale: She is a resident of East Rodney, Maine, the fictional setting in the story. She has spent almost the entirety of her life in this small coastal town and is a kind of local celebrity. Nancy is known for her beauty, humility and charm, and enjoys to dance.

Mr. Gale: He is Nancy’s father and spends his life taking care of her once she is ill.

Uncle Ezra: He is Nancy’s uncle who lives four miles outside the city of Boston on a farm with his wife. He is a hardworking, stern older man. He carries a lot of affection for his niece and hosts Nancy when she visits Boston.

Mr. Daniel Carew: Tom Aldis’ friend who hurts his ankle while the two are in East Rodney, Maine. We never hear him speak.

- Plot Summary:

The first section of the story is centered on the relationship between Nancy Gale and Tom Aldis throughout their lives. It begins in Boston several months after Tom spent time with Nancy’s family in East Rodney, Maine. Tom was forced to spend time on the island as his friend sprained his ankle and could no longer travel. Tom and Nancy share a deep connection, which hints at romance but is never explicitly stated. This is Nancy’s first visit to Boston (she is staying with her aunt and uncle four miles outside of the city). Tom gets permission from Uncle Ezra to spend the day with Nancy in the city. He is beguiled by her excitement at the city and helps her purchase gifts for several of her family members back home. She then attends a dance class with Tom’s aunt, a woman she finds extremely elegant and poised. Nancy informs Tom that a young woman whom he was involved with in East Rodney the previous summer is now seeing another suitor. As the two say good-bye, Tom hopes they will see each other soon.

The second section of the story begins 15 years after their day together in Boston. The two have not spoken this entire time. Tom is now married with children. Tom regrets not writing to Nancy in that time. He did, however, send her many books. om is traveling to East Rodney to survey land purchased by his father. When he arrives he is excited to see Nancy. He attends a ball and is greeted by Nancy’s father, who informs him that she has been ill with a serious form of rheumatoid arthritis for quite sometime. She is no longer capable of leaving one room in her house. She spends her days giving dance lessons and giving extra help to students from the local school who are having learning trouble. Tom is deeply saddened by this information and travels the next day to visit her. Upon seeing her, he is immediately happy and remembers their friendship, which he thinks has not changed at all. She expresses how happy she is to see him, and does not spend a lot of time complaining of her situation.

The next section of the story begins several months later. Tom has now built a new house on his father's land (which he was originally going to sell). There is no longer any mention of his wife or children. He has also purchased Nancy a form of wheelchair, which she uses to leave her house and visit Tom outside in the beautiful weather. Everyone in the town is happy that she is able to move about.

The story ends with Tom and Nancy sharing an emotional moment in which she says “there never has been a day when I haven’t thought of you."

=== "Fame’s Little Day" ===
- Characters

Mr. Abel Pinkham: He is the male protagonist of this story. He is the elderly owner and founder of Pinkham Maple Sugar Company in Vermont and feels extremely attached to his life in the countryside of Vermont.

Mrs. Mary-Ann Pinkham: She is the wife of Abel Pinkham. She is fond of cooking, life in the countryside, and is considered humble.

Mr. Fitch: He is a wealthy business partner of Mr. Abel Pinkham. He lives in New Jersey with his wife. He has a reputation of being an honest businessman and an extremely loyal friend.

- Plot Summary:

This story is much shorter than The Life of Nancy. It begins with a short description of why Mr. Pinkham’s visit to New York City was featured in the newspaper by a particular reporter. The story then focuses on the rest of Mr. and Mrs. Pinkham’s business trip to New York City. The two stay at the Ethan Allen Hotel. They do not have friends in the city and are very uncomfortable with the noise and fast-paced nature of city life. They soon find out that they have been featured in the Tribune newspaper, which brings both of them extreme joy and pride. Mrs. Pinkham decides to cut out the article and send it to her daughter, Sarah.

In the second chapter of the story, Mr. Pinkham partakes in a business deal with Mr. Fitch. Mr. Fitch purchases a very large order of maple sugar from Mr. Pinkham's compaany. The two men share a quick exchange about the various papers that Mr. Pinkham and his wife are featured in. Mr. Fitch jokes that he is in such prestigious company. Later that day Mr. and Mrs. Pinkham go to purchase the several newspapers that in which the two are discussed- they find that one newspaper even created a fake interview with Mr. Pinkham and a reporter. Mr. Pinkham wants to take his wife to the circus, but she fears that it is not dignified enough for the two of them to be seen there. She is slightly embarrassed by her out-of-season clothing, but her husband reassures her that she is beautiful. He decides that they should to spend their hard-earned money in any way that they choose, so they hire a carriage to take them around (despite protests from Mrs. Pinkham for the two to take the cheaper route).

The final chapter of this story takes place in the hotel the couple is staying at. The two discuss how wonderful the city is and how much flattery they have received throughout their stay. Shortly after, the original reporter who wrote about them in the paper greets them at the door of their hotel. He does not introduce himself, but rather bows to them out of respect. He is intimidated by their new exuding self-confidence and decides not to ask Mr. Pinkham to speak at a business venture the next day. Mr. and Mrs. Pinkham decide that this man was of no consequence..

=== "A War Debt" ===
- Characters

Tom Burton: The male protagonist of the story. Lost both of his parents at a very young age and was raised by his grandmother, Mrs. Burton. He enjoys traveling and frequently takes extremely long trips.

Mrs. Burton: The sole family member of Tom Burton, she lives in Boston during the winter.

Dennis: Works for Tom and Mrs. Burton at their home in Boston.

Mr. Bellamy: elder plantation owner in Virginia. Lives with Wife, Mrs. Bellamy on their worn down plantation in Virginia. Went to Harvard with Tom Burton’s grandfather.

Mrs. Bellamy: Mr. Bellamy’s wife. She is crippled and unable to walk.

- Plot Summary

The first chapter of this story begins with Tom Burton on a walk in Boston. He thinks of how it is too early in the winter season to have moved to the city, but his grandmother is stuck in her old ways. She is his only living family and he loves her dearly. He has recently returned from a three-year trip to find his grandmother much older and dependent on him. He is now living with her in Boston with no plans to take any long-term vacations in the near future. He then goes to have tea with her and the two enjoy a day of gossip, tea and food.

The Second chapter of this story continues with Tom and his grandmother eating dinner. The two discuss their days and enjoy one another’s company. As soon as Dennis, their servant leaves the room Tom’s grandmother rushes to a secret cabinet to show Dennis a piece of silverware. Tom is confused by her impatient/nervous demeanor but follows her nevertheless. She pulls out a silver cup with two handles and tells Tom that it was stolen during the war. She says that her father purchased it from someone who had taken it from the rubble of someone’s home in Virginia. She laments that she has been struggling with feelings of guilt since she received it from Tom’s father - who we learned died shortly after purchasing the cup along with Tom’s mother. She asks Tom to return it to its rightful owner. Tom accepts the challenge to travel to Virginia to find the family to which the cup belongs. His only clue is the crest that is on the cup, which reads “Je vous en prie Bellamy!”. He learns that it belongs to the Bellamy’s, a once very wealthy and powerful Virginian family. He begins to plan for his trip.

The third, and shortest, chapter of this story gives a short description of the train ride that Tom takes to Virginia. He is upset by the lack of order that exists between White and Black people on the train. Upon arrival he immediately notices a beautiful girl speaking with her friends. He becomes slightly infatuated with her and they make eye contact while he listens to her and her friends discuss the upcoming horse races.

Tom then travels by horse to the Bellamy estate. Mr. Bellamy, the owner of the house, immediately greets him. Tom introduces himself as Burton’s grandson, who Mr. Bellamy went to Harvard with. Mr. Bellamy takes tom into his home to meet his wife. The two are introduced and Tom is invited to stay for dinner. He is also asked to stay in their granddaughter's room, as she is absent. Tom takes a walk around the estate and observes the old slave quarters- it seems he is slightly saddened by it.

Tom returns to the main house for dinner. Mrs. Bellamy is carried to the table, as she is crippled. They enjoy the dinner of fish and the bird that Tom shot earlier in the day. It is apparent that the house was once such a great place, but the war took many of the family’s riches. Mr. Bellamy is dressed in a slightly tattered suit. After Mrs. Bellamy leaves for bed, Mr. Bellamy and Tom decide to smoke. Tom goes to get his pipe and brings Mr. Bellamy the silver cup. Mr. Bellamy is overjoyed at the return of this object that he is brought to tears. He tells tom that his family calls this cup, “their lucky cup”.

The two men greatly enjoy each other’s company and are extremely nostalgic for the past. Tom feels he has found a true friend and that he has replaced his grandfather in Mr. Bellamy’s mind. They smoke and drink for a while before they go to sleep. The next morning Tom joins Mr. Bellamy on a walk around the property. Both of them are sad at how the land has been ruined by the war. Several African American families approach Mr. Bellamy, and it is apparent that he has been helping them with food and the like for a while. He sends them to the kitchen area to get help. Tom gives Mr. Bellamy his gun and Mr. Bellamy accepts it from both Tom and his grandfather. They hope to see each other again and Tom hopes to be treated as a son for both Mr. and Mrs. Bellamy, as they lost all their kids in the war. Tom soon realizes that the portrait hanging in the main entrance to the house of Mrs. Bellamy is familiar as it looks like girl he saw his first day in Virginia. He learns that she is their granddaughter.

=== "The Hiltons Holiday" ===
- Character List:

John Hilton: Male protagonist of the story. Owner and farmer at Hilton Farm.

Mrs. Hilton: John’s wife.

Susan Ellen: A daughter of John and Mrs. Hilton. She is extremely feminine and is already a heartbreaker at her young age. Mostly interested in material things.

Katy: The Hilton’s other daughter. She is more interested in farming and nature than her sister. Neither of her parents thinks she is going to get married. She is extremely affectionate for her father, much more than her sister is.

Judge Masterson: wealthy resident of Topham Corners. He grew up with John Hilton’s mother.

- Plot Summary:

This story begins with a conversation between Mr. John Hilton and Mrs. Hilton. The two have just ended a day’s work on the farm and are both very tired. They are saddened at the loss of their son. However, they discuss how they feel lucky to have two daughters that spend time with them. Their daughters are out visiting some friends of theirs and so they begin to talk about them. Katy spends time with her father working on the fields, while Susan Ellen enjoys housework with her mother. They discuss how Katy may become a teacher while Susan Ellen will certainly find a suitable husband when she comes of age. Mr. Hilton decides that he needs to treat his daughters to a trip to Topham Corners, a place that Mrs. Hiltons knows the Mr Hilton has had a pre-existing interest to visit. The daughters come home and Susan Ellen spends a while discussing the fun party that she just attended. Her teacher threw the party. Katy sits quietly by her father.

The next morning the family decides to leave for Topham Corners. They put on their best clothes and travel by carriage. Mrs. Hilton does not accompany them, and John thinks to himself that it is for the best as despite his love for her, the trip will be better without her. They continue to drive and John tells many stories to his daughters about crops, farming and past lives. Susan Ellen is so excited to get into the city, while Katy enjoys nature and is scared of the new city.

Once they arrive in the Topham Corners, John tells his daughters to act properly as they will now be in the presence of extremely high-class people. John begins to tell the Girls that they are going to pass the house of Judge Masterson. Masterson went to school with John’s mother and the two knew each other very well. John tells his daughters that his mother had a very hard life and that is why he is so lucky to have them. They turn the corner and see the beautiful, stately house. The girls both think that they have never seen something so beautiful. All of a sudden, Judge Masterson walks towards the gate of his house and recognizes John! Susan Ellen is not very entertained by the story nor the appearance of the Judge, but Katy is ecstatic and behaves with her best manners. They spend the next few hours shopping and talking.

John and the girls run into several old family friends. One old friend comments how strong the resemblance between the daughters and their mother is. John wants to buy his wife a present and decides that they should take a family photo. He then buys her a pepperbox and the family rides the carriage home. When they get home they great Mrs. Hilton with the presents and discuss what a wonderful day it was.

=== "The Only Rose" ===
- Characters

Mrs. Bickford: The protagonist of this story. She is the widow of three husbands and lives in a beautiful home alone. She has no children. An extremely private and quiet person.

Miss. Abby Pendexter: Mrs. Bickford’s neighbor and friend, who lives alone and is more talkative and lively than Mrs. Bickford. For that reason, they enjoy each other’s company.

Parsons: Mrs. Bickford’s sister. We never meet her.

Tommy: Mrs. Bickford’s nephew. We never meet him.

Mr. Bickford: Mrs. Bickford’s most recent husband. He was extremely successful, yet cool. She misses him dearly.

Mr. Wallis: Mrs. Bickford’s second husband.

Mr. Albert Fraley: Mrs. Bickford’s first love.

John: Mrs. Bickford’s nephew. A young romantic with a deep affection for his aunt.

- Plot Summary

The story opens with Mrs. Bickford in her kitchen. We learn that she has a beautiful garden, but does not take too much care to it. She has three bouquets of flowers on her kitchen windowsill. Soon, her neighbor, Miss. Abby Pendexter comes to visit. The two women have known each other for a long while and enjoy one another’s company.

Abby compliments Mrs. Bickford on her flowers and her beautiful home. Mrs. Bickford then shares that she is collecting bouquets for her three dead husbands graves. She says that her nephew came to bring her flowers from her sister and that she loves him dearly. Ms. Bickford then spends time describing each of her husbands. She begins with Mr. Wallis, who was her least favorite husband. He was obsessed with inventions and spent most of his time coming up with new gadgets. For this reason, the two of them spent their time together with little luxury. She says that he was a good-hearted man, but that she never really liked him. Mrs. Bickford then continues with a description of her third and favorite husband, Mr. Bickford. She laments that he was a kind, honorable and humble man. He never spoke unless he had something to say. He left her with a lot of money and she discusses how she is so thankful to him for the luxury. She then discusses her first husband, Mr. Albert Fraley. She says that she was so young and in love. Although they did not have a lot of money she says that she was never so happy. However, he died so young and left her heart-broken.

Mrs. Bickford tries to create three identical bouquets for the three graves, but is upset that she only has one rose to give. She does not want to favor any over the other. Abby then discusses how she never married because the man she loved was unavailable. Mrs. Bickford is surprised by this information, as she did not think that Abby was interested in having a romantic relationship. When Abby leaves the house, she thinks to herself that the rose should go in Albert’s bouquet.

In the second, and final, chapter of this story Mrs. Bickford awakes extremely anxious about to which husband she should give the rose. She waits for her nephew John to pick her up to take her to the cemetery. The two ride together- sharing true affection for one another. Mrs. Bickford is surprised at how mature he is. John tells his aunt that he is planning to be married. Mrs. Bickford is ecstatic at this development and complements his choice of bride- whom she met on one occasion. She offers to help them- probably with financial means- when they get married. When they arrive at the graveyard, John offers to bring the bouquets to her husbands’ graves, as it is extremely hot outside. Mrs. Bickford is relieved, although ashamed, that she will not have to decide to whom to give the rose. When John comes back, he tells his aunt that one flower fell out of the bouquets and asks if he can give it to his fiancé. Sure enough, the flower is the rose. Mrs. Bickford laughs and remembers Albert, her first husband. Just like him, John is a romantic. The two leave the cemetery in laughter.

=== "A Second Spring" ===
- Characters

Israel Haydon: Protagonist of the story. He is a widower of Martha Haydon. He is the owner of the farm on which he lives. He is an extremely sensitive, elegant and hard working-man.

Martha Haydon: The deceased and beloved wife of Israel Haydon.

Ms. Abby Martin: Israel Haydon’s sister.

Stevens: Israel Haydon’s sister.

Maria Durrant: The new housekeeper turned second wife of Israel Haydon. She is a long-time friend of William Haydon’s wife. She is an extremely able and smart woman who has worked hard her entire life.

Polly Norris: An acquaintance of Maria Durrant and Israel Haydon. She is not completely sane and loves to gossip and as for help from her friends.

- Plot Summary

The first chapter of this story begins right after the funeral of Israel Haydon’s wife of 40 years, Martha Haydon. He is in the barn on their farm extremely depressed. He thinks to himself that she was so much better than he in social situations and would have known how to handle the funeral meal. He decides to go into the main house where his sister and sister in law are waiting for him. He steps inside the house where the two women have cleaned and prepared a dinner for him. Israel does not have much appetite and discusses how he wishes his son and wife had come over. Abby and Stevens talk amongst themselves about the events of the evening.

The next chapter begins the morning after the funeral. Israel and his son go on a walk, discussing everyday events. We get a short description of how Israel found out from the doctor that his wife was extremely ill and that she would not get better. We also learn that both him and his wife had inherited a small amount of money from a distant relative. William is a much stronger man than his father and it shows. Israel is known for being extremely elegant, even while working on the farm. William offers to have his father stay with him in his home, but Israel is stubborn and refuses the help. The two share an awkward moment and William drives away. As soon as he leaves, Israel breaks down in tears for his lost wife. His two sisters watch from inside the house and comment on how sad he has been. They discuss how they need to go through the late Martha’s clothing, and decide to ask William for help, as him and his mother were so close. We learn that William was quite talented at sewing and knitting as a child. Some time passes and Israel returns to his regular life. His sister leaves- and Israel hires a summer hand for help. The two have quite a strained relationship as Israel finds the boy to be lazy but it works out.

The next chapter of this story begins two months after the passing of Martha Haydon. William and his son are sitting on the porch of his house discussing the lack of order in his house. William says that he feels his father is angry at him for something and wishes to apologize. Israel, however, says it is simply that he is still grieving his wife. He says that he cannot maintain the state of the house the way his wife used to. William invites his father over for dinner and to see Maria Durrant, a woman that could possibly work for him as a housekeeper. Israel met her a while ago when William’s wife was sick and thinks she is one of the most able women he has ever met. When they meet, they immediately take to each other. The next morning Maria ignores Israel’s request to begin work in the afternoon, and decides to start early. She leaves William’s house and arrives at Israel’s farm. There she notices the terrible state of the garden and decides to bring it back to the state in which it was when Martha tended to it- Israel told her earlier in the evening that he wanted to do this himself but was having trouble.

The fourth chapter of this book takes place entirely in Mr. Haydon’s kitchen. Martha Durrant is mending some clothing, when a visitor surprises her. The visitor is an old acquaintance of both Maria and Israel by the name of Polly Norris. She is an extremely irritating woman who is not completely sane of mind. She frequently visits people to ask for help. The two gossip a while. Polly informs Maria that there is a rumor going around that she has been at the farm for too long. People are beginning to think that she wants to marry Mr. Haydon. Polly then quickly changes the subject as she realizes that Maria is upset. She asks Maria for an old work robe to use and Maria quickly leaves the room. Their visit ends shortly after and Maria begins to cry uncontrollably. She feels that this is the first time that she has been happy in a long while. She thinks that she now has to leave the farm and go back to her brother’s house. She works extremely hard in his hotel- tending for guests and her cruel sister-in-law, and does not receive any thanks. Israel comes inside the house and Maria tells him that she needs to leave. He refuses and surprisingly tells her that he has been talking to William and they have decided that he should marry Maria, if she will accept him. She accepts his proposal without saying anything.

The final chapter of this story takes place after church one Sunday. Maria and Israel are now married. Maria thinks to herself how lucky she is that she has such a loving husband. The two begin to discuss the late Martha. Maria is extremely kind when discussing her. She continually complements her ‘predecessor’ and so does Israel. Maria suggests that they should invite one of Martha’s oldest friends to the house for tea, as Martha used to. When the guest arrives a day later, Israel overhears the two ladies talking about how sad he was when Martha died. Maria comments that she is so lucky to have met him, but sad that she is not as significant as Martha. The guest comments that she has never seen Israel so happy since he was a young man. After the guest leaves Israel comes inside and tells Martha that he is so happy to have met her, that she is a “good wife”- replacing Martha with Maria once and for all.

=== "Little French Mary" ===
- Characters

Old Captain Weathers: Older man in Dulham. Particularly infatuated with French Mary. A kind of leader in the town.

Alexis: The Canadian newcomer into Dulham. Extremely able-bodied and hard working.

Ezra Spooner: Another townsman infatuated with French Mary.

Henry Staples: Townsman and shop owner infatuated with French Mary.

French Mary: Alexis’ daughter. Beautiful and young.

- Plot Summary

This is the shortest story in the book. It is set in the town of Dulham. The town is expecting new residents from Canada. A man by the name of Alexis, his wife and young daughter Mary. The townsmen (Captain Weathers, Ezra Spooner and Henry Staples) discuss how they feel he will be extremely helpful around the town as a kind of handyman. The Canadians are moving into a small white house that was previously uninhabited. They are moving from a nearby town because they became ill from their factory work and such. The townsmen sit in the general store, run by Henry staples and gossip. The young daughter, Mary, enters the room. She says hello in French and immediately steals all of the old men’s hearts. She brings light and energy into the room.

The entire town comes to love the little girl and all the joy she brings to their everyday lives. Soon, however, the Canadians decide to leave town to live with an aging aunt in Canada. Captain Weathers brings the news to the other men and they are extremely saddened- they complain about Canadians in general and are sad that Mary will be leaving them. Mary enters ecstatic about her travels and the old men change their minds and become happy for her. Several of them buy her gifts and she runs home to leave. The men say they hope that the French Canadians will appreciate Mary as they do.

=== "The Guests of Mrs. Timms" ===
- Characters

Mrs. Persis Flagg: Old woman and female protagonist.

Mrs. Cynthia Pickett: A slightly younger acquaintance of Persis, Cynthia feels slightly lower class than she. However, she recently inherited a lot of money.

Mrs. Timms: A wealthy/entitled acquaintance of Persis and Cynthia.

Captain Dyer: Cynthia’s uncle, from who she has inherited a lot of money

Stranger: Female on the stagecoach with Cynthia and Persis that is going to visit Ezra Beckett.

Miss. Ezra Beckett: Wealthy resident of Baxter.

Mrs. Nancy Fell: Sickly, less well of acquaintance of Cynthia and Persis. Extremely hospitable.

- Plot Summary

This story begins in the home of Mrs. Persis Flagg. She is an elderly woman living alone. She is waiting for a visitor on a beautiful June day, Cynthia Pickett. The two are not such great friends but recently have become closer. For this reason, there is still much formality between the two of them when they meet. Persis is described as being a slightly sour woman, but she enjoyed the company of Cynthia. Cynthia arrives and the two discuss a meeting with Mrs. Timms. Cynthia is unsure if she should go, but Persis ensures her that Mrs. Timms is so excited to see them both. Cynthia tentatively agrees- she doesn't want to overstay her welcome at Persis’ house and decides to leave. When she leaves, Persis is saddened that she did not get to close the gate herself, something she enjoys doing.

In the next chapter, both women walk to visit Mrs. Timms at her house in Baxter. Both are dressed in some of their finest clothing, Persis in black cashmere and Cynthia in a black dress. Persis has brought a homemade jelly as a gift for Mrs. Timms. Cynthia is embarrassed that she did not think to bring a gift and discusses again how she is unsure that Mrs. Timms initially wanted her to come to her house. But Cynthia is now thankful that Persis convinced her to go with. Persis asks Cynthia to mention a recipe of Mrs. Timms once they arrive so as to complement her. Cynthia agrees to try and mention it to Mrs. Timms. The two ladies begin to walk fast as they are late and a stagecoach is approaching them!

The two women settle in the back of the stagecoach and begin conversing amongst themselves. All of a sudden they begin talking with a stranger sitting next to them. They learn that she is going to visit a friend she met at a religious conference. The ladies discuss their particular sects of religion. After a short while they pass a house that Persis recognizes as that of Ms. Ezra Beckett, the stranger comments that that is the woman she is going to visit! The stagecoach comes to a halt and the stranger exits. A confused Ezra, who does not remember meeting this woman, greets the stranger. The stranger tries to convince Ezra of their meeting, and Persis and Cynthia look on. The bus drives away, and the ladies say they will tell Mrs. Timms this story when they arrive. Persis once again reminds Cynthia to mention the recipe to Mrs. Timms.

The two ladies arrive at Mrs. Timms house. She takes a while to answer the door. When she does, she is surprised to see both Persis and Cynthia there. She invites the ladies into a parlor room and sits on a chair slightly too far away for their to be a good rapport during the visit. They discuss a few subjects, but the visit seems impersonal. Mrs. Timms does not offer them a tour of the house, nor does she ask them to make themselves comfortable. The whole visit is extremely short and cordial. The ladies leave and are both slightly speechless about how poorly the meeting went. Persis even wishes Mrs. Timms some ill. They decide to visit Mrs. Nancy Fell and tell her they just felt like traveling. They leave slightly saddened by Mrs. Timms.

In the final chapter of this story, Cynthia and Persis are riding home from their visits with Nancy and Mrs. Timms in the same stagecoach that they took that morning. They discuss how pleasant their visit with Nancy was. She was extremely hospitable and fed them well. Persis quotes from the bible to emphasize the pleasantries of their visit. They comment again on how rude Mrs. Timms was during their meeting- saying that she could have turned them away if it was inconvenient for her at that moment. They pass Ezra Beckett’s house again and find the stranger from earlier sitting peacefully in the window. Ezra comes outside to tell the driver that they need to send for the girl’s bags, confusing all of the passengers who had seen the strange exchange earlier in the day. Persis comments that Ezra must be extremely hospitable, and the story comes to a close.

=== "Neighbor’s Landmark" ===
- Characters

John Packer: Owner of Packer Farm. He is a stubborn and well-respected man in the town.

Mr. Ferris: Local timber salesman/contractor.

Lizzie Packer: John Packer’s daughter.

Mary Hannah Packer: Mr. Packer’s wife. She is a timid woman with deep affection for her husband although he does not treat her with much respect.

Joe Banks: Local fisherman.

Bill Otis: Shoe-store owner.

Chauncey: Local fisherman/business partner with Joe Banks.

- Plot Summary:

This story begins in a conversation between a contractor, Mr. Ferris and John Packer. The contractor comes to ask John packer if he would like to sell him two timber trees in his backyard. John is extremely irritable and refuses to sell them to the offer of $75. He says that he doesn't care if they fall down and he can manage them himself, to which the contractor objects. John then decides to leave and notices two people looking at him from inside the house. The contractor claims that he will not raise his offer.

In the next chapter, John enters his home after a day's work outside to find his wife, Mary Hannah and his daughter Lizzie in the kitchen. It is clear that Lizzie has been crying and he cannot understand why she is upset. After Lizzie leaves the room, Mary tells her husband that Lizzie had been watching him talk earlier with Mr. Farris and thought that he was going to sell the trees. Lizzie is extremely attached to the trees, as they are kind of a landmark to the family and the town in general. Mary makes her husband a mean before he heads out to the town center. John thinks to himself that he should keep the trees, as the women of his house love them so dearly- the town does as well. We learn that Mr. Farris is a sneaky businessman who has taken advantage of many people in times of need- paid them less than deserved for their timber. Mr. Farris is upset that he has not signed the business deal with John. He looks at the trees and thinks to himself how important they are to everyone: lovers, children and friends.

In this next chapter of the story, two new characters are introduced Chauncey and Joe Banks. While Mr. Ferris and John talk on the shore, these two other men fish out in the water. They complain that there is no more fish. Chauncey wants to stop for the season, but Joe wants to stay out longer. It begins to snow. They begin to discuss the matter of the timber trees between Ferris and John. Chauncey tells Joe that he needs to sign a petition in town to keep the trees. Joe says that although John is an unpleasant man, he is not a bad person and they think he will decide in their favor. They fear that the petition will do no good.

The next morning is Christmas Eve, and John decides to take his fishing boat out to think over the tree matter alone. He thinks to himself that the $80 would be so helpful if his daughter were to marry Joe. When he gets to the fishing dock he sees Joe and reluctantly invites him to come fishing with him. Joe declines and John takes out the boat alone. He thinks to himself about his family and about the trees. Despite his rough exterior he does have a need to be accepted by the community. This makes his decision even more difficult. Before he gets a chance to decide he sees Mr. Farris driving his woodchoppers towards the trees. He tries to get to shore, but knows that he will not be able to do it in time. He laments that he has been a fool and knows he must keep the trees. He hopes that Lizzie will stall Mr. Farris.

The next chapter begins with Joe and Lizzie at the Packer farm on Christmas. They all hear a loud noise and Joe tells John that the whole town has come to celebrate him for stopping Farris from cutting down the trees! The whole town comes to the party and they all celebrate. This story ends with the trees shining in the moonlight.

=== My Sad Captains ===
- Characters

Mrs. Peter Lunn: Widow of Captain Lunn. Object of desire by all men in this story.

Captain Lunn: Maria Lunn’s late husband.

Captain Asa Shaw: Fishing Captain in Longport.

Captain Crowe: Fishing Captain in Longport.

Captain Witherspoon: Fishing Captain in Longport.

- Plot Summary:

This story begins with a description of Mrs. Maria Lunn. She is the widow of Captain Lunn. When her husband died, he lost his fortune, so presently she has no money. However, she is an extremely thrifty woman and, therefore, is very good at saving money. When her husband died, she was much younger than him. Her friends now are more interested in her behavior as she has taken an interest in three Captains of the fishing town: Captain Shaw, Crowe and Witherspoon. The author then introduces herself for the first time in the book. She thinks that it is important to describe all three captains. She tells us that Captain Witherspoon is an extremely small man with a very large ego- he is very outgoing. Captain Crowe is extremely tall and clumsy. He lacks confidence and is very shy. Captain Shaw is the most pleasing of the three as he has a larger shipping business, as he owns a tugboat. His sisters, however, are not happy at the idea of him marrying again and so this has made it very difficult for him. All three are in love with Maria. She likes Witherspoon the best as he is a hopeless romantic and extremely good with children. She thinks he is the best company for her.

The next chapter begins with Captain Shaw visiting Maria at her home one evening. He arrives and moments later there is another knock on the door. To everyone’s surprise, Captain Crowe arrives at her house. He is dressed in his best coat, and Shaw feels embarrassed for not having dressed up. The two men exchange pleasantries, with hints of criticism and jealousy. Maria quickly interrupts them and changes the conversation to avoid confrontation. Soon there is another knock and Witherspoon arrives with gifts of fish. All three men hoped to visit Maria alone. After they leave they all say to themselves in private that they should figure out a way to impress Maria.

The next chapter takes place in a fishing warehouse. Witherspoon is there to air it out when he runs into Crowe. The two reminisce about the old fishing days. Now there are not enough fish to go around and business has turned sour. They lament that they never expected to see their town become this way. They begin to talk about Maria Lunn and gossip about which man she might choose. Witherspoon says he is sad that he is alone- that he never expected to remain single for his life. They discuss their competition in Mr. Shaw who has the most money, but they feel he is not right for Maria Lunn.

In this chapter, Maria has just returned from a trip to a funeral for her cousin who passed. She thinks to herself how kind this cousin was to her- gave her money and the like. Maria is on her way to church wearing her Sunday best. She is excited for church, as she will be seeing the new Minister, who she has taken an extreme liking to. Many of the townspeople are surprised to both see her at church and at her decision to waste no time in gaining the affections of the minister. Rumors begin to spread about her engagement to the minister, yet she is unscathed by the negativity as many people support her decision. She has especially offended Crowe’s sisters who feel Maria misled their brother.

In this final chapter of the story, each of the three captains pay a visit to Mrs. Lunn to propose to her. Shaw pleads with her with his wealth and power, but she refuses him. Crowe is refused before he even has a chance to ask. However, when Witherspoon arrives and begins to share his feelings, the two share a mutual understanding that they should be together. The business with the minister is settled- he will be a paid boarder at their house. Witherspoon discusses with Crowe a while later that his business is doing much better and that he is a very lucky man.

=== "A Winter Courtship" ===
- Character List:

Mr. Jefferson Briley: Coach driver.

Ms. Fanny Tobin: Widow and farm owner.

- Plot Summary:

The final story of this book takes place on a journey between two towns. The driver of a passenger carriage, by the name of Jefferson Briley, is taking Fanny Tobin home. The two of them begin to exchange pleasantries. They discuss the weather, school, their appearances, living situations and many other strange topics. However, all of a sudden he proposes to her. After some protest, saying that her dead husband can never be replaced, she agrees.
