= Old Friends and New =

Old Friends and New is a series of short stories written by Sarah Orne Jewett. It was published in The Atlantic Monthly in seven installments – one short story in each volume – in 1878. In 1879, the short stories were compiled and published by Houghton, Osgood and Company. The stories from Old Friends and New are clear examples of the local color movement, with descriptions of the peaceful, rural settings. They all take place in New England in the late nineteenth century.

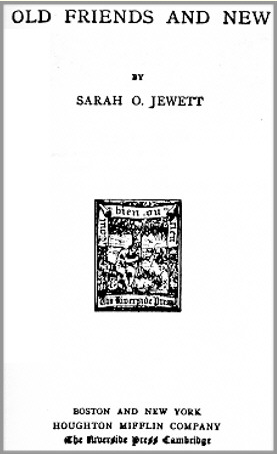
A book cover of Old Friends and New, by Sarah Orne Jewett from 1907.

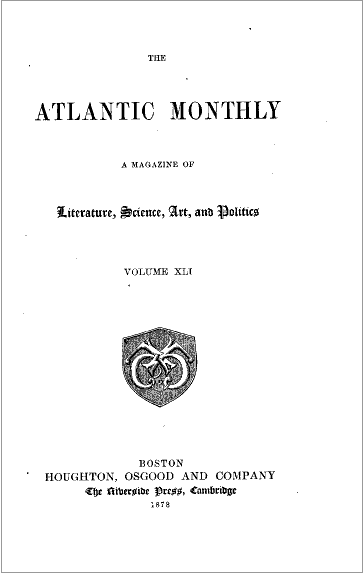
The cover of Volume 41 of The Atlantic Monthly from January 1878. Jewett's first short story from Old Friends and New, A Lost Lover, appeared in this issue.

== Plot summary ==
=== A Lost Lover ===
Miss Horatia Dane is a lonely widow who lives in Longfield, far from any family. The narrator reveals a rumor that Miss Dane had a lover who was lost at sea, though she never mentions him. Nelly Dane, the daughter of Miss Horatia’s youngest cousin, comes to stay with Miss Horatia in Longfield. Nelly is extremely helpful around the house, and everyone in this small, rural area loves her. Nelly hears about the rumor of Miss Dane’s deceased lover from one of the townspeople, and promptly asks Melissa, Miss Dane’s servant. Melissa says that Miss Dane has never mentioned this lover, but that she has heard stories “from other folks.” Melissa says Miss Dane met Joe Carrick when she was visiting her great-aunt in Salem. It was assumed that they were going to marry after he came back from his journey, but the ship never returned. Melissa mentions that Miss Dane had never been interested in pursuing any other men, “on account of her heart’s being buried in the deep with him.” In an emotional conversation, Miss Dane confirms her loneliness to Nelly, but admits that she is used to it by now.

Later that week, a knock is heard at Miss Dane’s door. Melissa opens the door to find a beggar, who is welcomed by Miss Dane. The man tells her that he is a sailor, and has lived on ships ever since he was a boy. After the beggar mentions that he was raised in Salem, Miss Dane’s face becomes pale, and she can only stare at him. She realizes that this man is her lost lover, Joe Carrick, yet he does not recognize her. In the years following this incident, Miss Horatia Dane changes. She takes down the whale tooth that Carrick had given her, which she had displayed in her bedroom since he left on his voyage, and her age begins to show.

=== A Sorrowful Guest ===
Jack Ainslie writes his sister, Helen, in 1877, asking if she would like to come to America to live with him, for Jack is very lonely without any family. Their parents had died when they were younger. Jack had gone to college and then into the military, and Helen went to live with her aunt, Alice, in Florence, and remained there after she died. Helen, like her brother, feels lonely now, for she misses her family, so she agrees to come to America. Helen and Jack live a very comfortable and social life. One night, Jack’s friends come to have dinner with Helen and Jack. Helen takes a curious interest in Mr. Whiston, one of Jack’s lifelong friends. She overhears Jack and Whiston speaking about their army days, recalling the death of some of their friends, and notices that Whiston suddenly looks very pale – as if he sees a ghost. After Whiston leaves, Helen, Jack, and George Sheffield – another of Jack’s army comrades – speak about Whiston and his many oddities. They wonder if he is insane, but Jack diagnoses him with monomania instead, referencing one of the many medical journals he keeps in his home. “An object may appear to be present before his eyes which has no existence whatever there.”

Upon their next meeting, Whiston tells Helen that he believes in ghosts, and that, in fact, Henry Dunster – his cousin who died in the war – constantly follows him around. Whiston presents many examples of his hallucinations, but Jack asks if perhaps it is not truly Dunster, for he was only counted as missing during the war. A couple days later, Helen and Jack visit Whiston in a hospital, where he soon dies. Helen is disappointed by the loneliness of the hospital, and reflects on how grateful she is for having such a loving brother and so comfortable a home. Months later, Jack discovers Dunster at the Marine Hospital in Chelsea. Dunster had actually avoided death by crawling out of enemy territory, and though some of Whiston’s hallucinations were, in fact, sightings of Dunster, others were most certainly caused by his monomania.

=== A Late Supper ===
Miss Catherine Spring is a lonely, elderly woman who lives in Brookton, among the mountains and country. She had grown up as part of a big family, but everyone had died years before, and she had become accustomed to the solitude. She had been struggling financially, and no one had responded to her advertisement for summer boarders, so she had to think of other options. She writes to a niece in Lowell, requesting to stay with her, but soon learns that her niece will already have a relative staying with them for the summer. Spring’s nephew and his wife come to have dinner with Miss Spring without notifying her beforehand. Her nephew, Joseph, requests some cream for his tea, so Miss Spring crosses the street to her neighbor’s house to accommodate him. Spring's neighbor gives her the cream, but on her walk back across the road, Spring has to cross a train platform, hurrying through the train that is stopped there. Before Miss Spring can climb down the stairs on the other side, however, the train departs, leaving her in a train car with two strangers: Miss Ashton and her niece, Alice West. Miss Spring is concerned that her guests will be worried about her absence, but feels extremely comfortable with these two welcoming women. In fact, the women pay for Miss Spring’s train fare back to Brookton, but Spring promises to return the money, writing down their address.

Meanwhile, Miss Spring’s guests become concerned when they cannot find her. Due to her age, they speculate that she may have passed away. Miss Spring returns home, however, after having an adventure, and receives a letter from Alice West the next day. West requests boarding in Miss Spring’s house, for Ashton and West are unhappy in their summer home in the mountains. Upon receiving this letter, Miss Spring gets excited for her future. Spring is pleased to be staying in her home, instead of moving elsewhere, and is excited to welcome her guests as West and Ashton.

=== Mr. Bruce ===
Elly, a young girl without a family, is staying with her aunt Mary near Boston. In trying to comfort Elly, Mary reveals that Elly has not had a great upbringing, as her father has been useless in caring for her. She assures her that Miss Margaret Tennant, one of Mary's close friends, will visit them soon and will take great care of Elly. When Tennant visits, she tells Elly and Mary the story of the first time Kitty, her sister, and Mr. Bruce met.

Many years prior, Kitty’s mother received a letter from her husband requesting her to prepare dinner for four business partners that would be joining them for dinner. With such short notice, they did not have enough servants to help serve dinner, so Kitty volunteered to do it as a joke, acting as a servant. One of the guests, an Englishman named Mr. Bruce, caught Kitty’s attention, and the two made eye contact throughout the dinner, though he thought Kitty was just a servant, so he had no interest in talking to her. Several months later, Kitty goes to stay in Baltimore with her aunt, Alice Thornton, to help Alice care for her home.

In letters to her sister, Kitty mentions one instance when she is out dancing, and meets an Englishman whom she recognizes and who clearly recognizes her. This man, however, leaves Kitty after they are introduced, and avoids her for the rest of the party. Alice knows the man and tells Kitty his name: Bruce. Alice throws a party at her home, and Mr. Bruce is one of the guests. Kitty wants to get to know him, but he seems hesitant to speak to her. Kitty’s uncle, Rob, returns home to Baltimore with the news that he has invited Mr. Bruce to dinner. When Mr. Bruce shows up, he asks Kitty if she is Mrs. Hunter’s niece, and immediately realizes that Kitty was the servant at the dinner he had attended several months prior. She denies that she was the servant that he spoke of, but could not hold in her laughter. She only realizes that Mr. Bruce was the same Englishman whom she had seen months before at that dinner upon his questioning. They become very close, and when Kitty returns home to Boston, Mr. Bruce joins her. The following year they get married, and settle down in a house near Boston. “Kitty was always loyal to Boston, like the true Tennant that she is.”

=== Miss Sydney’s Flowers ===
Miss Sydney, a long-time resident of St. Mary Street learns that the city is planning to build a street connecting her street to Jefferson Street. This street will run right by Miss Sydney’s house, a house that is now in the heart of the city due to the urbanization of the area. Miss Sydney is not pleased with this, for she hates the noise, and has grown accustomed to being alone after the passing of all her friends and family. She is a cold and reserved woman, but is never intentionally rude to anyone. Now that her garden is right alongside this new street, Grant Place, Miss Sydney refuses to tend to it, but instead has John, her coachman, do the gardening.

Meanwhile, Mrs. Marley, an elderly candy saleswoman moves her stand from Jefferson Street to Garden Place – right outside Miss Sydney’s house – where there is less wind and more business. Miss Sydney is annoyed by the excessive noise from both the new street, in general, as well as Mrs. Marley’s candy cart right outside her window, however she comes to be very interested in the people. She loves watching everyone out of her window, and is prideful that so many people admire at her garden. “She was glad, now that the street was cut, that someone had more pleasure, if she had not.” Miss Sydney immediately becomes more kind and charitable, stopping by the cart to buy some molasses candy. John is extremely shocked, as Sydney proceeded to give this candy to some children on the street, an act that she would have never done before Grant Place was built. Miss Sydney knows that her change has gone noticed, and this embarrasses her. On their next meeting, Miss Sydney invites Mrs. Marley into her house to warm up, and proceeds to give her money to pay for her bills, as well as dinner for Marley and her sister. Bessie, a neighborhood girl, goes to visit Miss Sydney, for she pities her loneliness, and has noticed a change in her behavior. This is the beginning of a great friendship between the two, despite such a drastic age difference. Miss Sydney is very comfortable with Bessie, and confides a great deal in her, something she has never done with anyone, let alone a child. Sydney tells Bessie of her loneliness and how her age has affected her, but obvious change for the better has subdued these feelings now that Sydney is a warmer, more charitable person.

=== Lady Ferry ===
The narrator is to be left alone, as her parents are headed on a long sea voyage, and she is worried about being sent to school. She is instead put under the care of two of her father’s elderly cousins. The narrator is very upset to leave her mother, but is satisfied when she meets cousin Agnes, with whom she will be staying. The narrator feels very comfortable and safe with Agnes, and Agnes welcomes her as if she were her own child. Agnes mentions Lady Ferry, and elderly woman who resides with her and has no family left. Ferry is gentle, but she is not used to children, and her mind wanders. In their first meeting, Lady Ferry welcomes the narrator, and Ferry's age shows during their conversation. She has traveled the world extensively, and is surprised to hear of some very notable deaths, many of which had occurred many years prior. The narrator speaks with Martha, a young servant, who provides more information about Lady Ferry. It is rumored that Ferry will never die, and no one is quite sure from where she came. The narrator becomes more attached to Agnes’ home, and is saddened to leave. “Although I wished to see my father and mother, I cried as if my heart would break because I had to leave the ferry. The time spent there had been the happiest time of all my life.” After years of living abroad, the narrator returns to America with her father, and she decides to visit Agnes’ house. She discovers a very old grave – one of Lady Ferry – in the family burial ground, and is reassured by the fact that death is certain.

=== A Bit of Shore Life ===
The narrator tells about the previous summer, when she spent her days by the sea, watching the fishermen. She met just one boy who was her age, Georgie. He was very mature for his age – 12 years old – and lived with just his father, Andrew West, for his mother had died. West took the loss very poorly, and has refused to look for another wife. One day, when West, Georgie, and the narrator return from a fishing trip, they find Georgie’s aunt Hannah waiting on the shore, who speaks with West about some clothes that she has been making for them. She accepts a haddock from West, and before she returns home, invites the narrator to visit her.

The narrator and Georgie go to visit Hannah, and encounter an auction from a house up for sale. On seeing the large crowd present, the narrator reflects on life in New England. “I wonder if anyone has not often been struck…by the sadness and hopelessness which seems to overshadow many of the people who live on the lonely farms in the outskirts of small New-England villages.” She pities the solitude of such a rural life, for it seems that everyone is so unhappy out in the country. They finally arrive at Hannah’s house, and meet her younger sister, Miss Cynthia West. Hannah and Cynthia tell the narrator that they wish that Georgie had come to live with them after Georgie's mother died, for the two sisters could have used the help, but it would have been impossible to pry Georgie away from both his father and the sea. The narrator expresses regret of moving out of her childhood home. “I knew where the flowers grow under [the trees], and where the ferns were greenest, and it was as much home to me as my own house.” The narrator finds comfort in familiarity, and misses the place that she could call home. On the way back from Hannah’s house, Georgie and the narrator pass the house that had been auctioned, which now sits boarded up. Upon reaching the sea, the narrator feels content having returned home.

== Characters ==
=== A Lost Lover ===
Miss Horatia Dane – A lonely, elderly widow in Longfield, she stays much to herself, clearly affected by the loss of her lover decades ago.

Nelly Dane – The daughter of Miss Dane’s youngest cousin, Nelly stays with Miss Dane for the summer, helping her around the house. Since her father and brother are out west working, she relates to Miss Dane’s loneliness, and the two form a strong bond.

Joe Carrick – Miss Horatia Dane’s long-lost lover, he was apparently lost at sea on a voyage as a young man. He and Miss Dane were supposed to marry as soon as he returned to port in Salem, but he never came back. Carrick, in fact, was rescued after his ship started to sink, and lived much of his life out at sea. Now an elderly alcoholic, he is a homeless beggar in Longfield.

=== A Sorrowful Guest ===
Jack Ainslie – An elderly physician living by himself, he invites his sister to live with him in America. A college graduate and a military veteran, he lives in the same area in which he grew up, maintaining contact with the same childhood friends.

Helen Ainslie – Living by herself in Florence, she accepts Jack’s invitation to come to America and live with him.

Mr. Whiston – One of Jack’s friends from the war, Whiston is diagnosed with monomania, and the Ainslies view him as insane. After telling Jack of his hallucinations of one of his cousins who died in the war, he soon dies in the local hospital.

=== A Late Supper ===
Miss Catherine Spring – A lonely, elderly woman living in Brookton, she is struggling financially. A very welcoming woman, she goes out of her way to please her guests, but gets into trouble when she accidentally hitches a ride on a train, and ends up taking hours to return home.

Miss Ashton & Alice West – Women traveling to a country home around Brookton, they meet Miss Spring when she happens to stumble into their train car, and they welcome her aboard. They find their country home to be unsatisfactory, and immediately come to Miss Spring to board with her.

=== Mr. Bruce ===
Miss Margaret Tennant – One of aunt Mary's close friends, she narrates the story of when Kitty and Mr. Bruce met.

Kitty – A young woman from Boston, she goes to Baltimore to stay with her aunt. She meets Mr. Bruce and is immediately attracted to him. She constantly writes letters home to her sister, in which she raves about this man, and how much she enjoys his company.

Mr. Bruce – An Englishman, he is in Baltimore for business. He ends up moving to Boston with Kitty in order to marry her.

Alice – Kitty’s aunt in Baltimore, she welcomes Kitty when her husband goes abroad, excited to get some help around the house.

=== Miss Sydney’s Flowers ===
Miss Sydney – An elderly, lonely woman, she hates the noise that comes along with living in the city. She is unfriendly and stays to herself, but she is pleased when she sees the joy that her garden brings to everyone. She becomes more charitable and kind, to the surprise of everyone that knows her, most notably to Mrs. Marley and Bessie.

Mrs. Marley – An old, frail woman who takes care of her sister Polly, she earns money by selling molasses candy from a street cart. She moves her cart to Grant Place when the weather becomes too cold and windy, and she is one of the main benefactors of Miss Sydney’s charitable behavior.

John – Miss Sydney’s coachman, he tends to her garden once Grant Place is constructed, and is shocked by Miss Sydney’s behavioral adjustment in which she becomes kind and charitable.

Bessie – A young girl from the neighborhood, she befriends Miss Sydney after noticing how lonely the elderly woman is. She is the first child to whom Miss Sydney opens up, and the two women form a great friendship.

=== Lady Ferry ===
Narrator – Left alone by her parents who are traveling, she goes to live with two of her father’s elderly cousins. She becomes attached to Agnes’ house, and feels very at home there, saddened when she must return to her parents. She moves abroad with her father, but returns to America after many decades to learn that Lady Ferry has, in fact, died.

Agnes – An elderly woman who welcomes Lady Ferry to live with them, even though they do not know each other.

Lady Ferry – A mysterious woman, Lady Ferry is without any family, so cousin Agnes welcomes Ferry to live with her. She is rumored to be immortal, as no one knows her age, and she is clearly very old and senile. No one is quite sure where she came from, but it is believed that she has lived in the home in which Agnes now lives for decades, thus earning her name, Lady Ferry; due to the house only being accessible by ferry.

=== A Bit of Shore Life ===
Narrator – A young girl who spends her summers by the sea, she meets just one boy her age, Georgie, and has felt out of place ever since she left her childhood home.

Georgie – A 12-year-old fisherman, Georgie works harder than most adults, going out into the sea by himself. He lives with just his father, his mother having died.

Hannah – Georgie’s aunt, she welcomes the narrator to join her for dinner in the country, and makes her feel very welcome.

== Themes ==
Old Friends and New is about finding a home – a place where you feel safe, comfortable and fully accepted. Each short story focuses on a character who is unhappy in their current situation. They may have no family and friends nearby, or feel like they do not fit with their surroundings. Jewett takes readers on the characters' journeys to discover where they truly belong. When they do find "home," their lives significantly change. In Lady Ferry, the first-person narrator feels more comfortable after being in her cousin’s house for just one day than she ever has before. “I began to feel already the pleasure of being in a real home,” Jewett writes. Finding "home" for Jewett's characters doesn't always require uprooting, or embarking on a long trip. In some of the stories, the quest for "home" is an internal one. The characters make small adjustments, while looking inward. Without traveling anywhere at all, they realize they are already happy. Still, some of Jewett's characters must travel great distances, and experience life-altering changes, in order to arrive at home.

Old Friends and New demonstrates the importance of religion to New England society in the late nineteenth and early twentieth centuries. Though often only minor components of each story, religion is often mentioned alongside comfort. Religious symbols and practices such as bibles and attending church are often found in those places that characters can call home, and the absence of loneliness comes, in part, to a rediscovering (or discovering) of religion. In Miss Sydney’s Flowers, Miss Sydney realizes that she had been unfriendly for so long, and sees the difference that her charity makes in Mrs. Marley’s life. She realizes the effect she can have on other people, and sees practicing Christian ways (such as charity) improves her own life. “Miss Sydney meant to be better, – not alone for the sake of having friends, not alone to quiet her conscience, but because she knew she had been so far from living a Christian life, and she was bitterly ashamed.” Once the characters realize that religion is a vital component of their lives, they are more satisfied in the way in which they lead their lives, and they feel more comfortable with who they are.

== Critical reception ==
Old Friends and New was released in successive monthly installments in The Atlantic Monthly magazine, beginning in January 1878. The short stories were published individually, and each was greeted by acclaim. Not only did the critics praise the stories, but they admired Jewett’s writing style as well. They extolled the messages she represented throughout the stories. This review from Literary World stresses the themes of Old Friends and New, while complimenting Jewett’s character as well. “She is not only one of the sweetest and most charming of writers, but her pages have [had] all along suggestions helpful towards a kindlier and higher way of living.”

Some reviews – such as this one from Scribner’s Monthly – focus instead on Jewett’s naturalist writing, in which she describes such simple events and focuses on the setting of the story. “They are so manifestly the results of actual observation that they almost impress us as personal confidences, and make us ashamed of being caught napping.” The light nature of these short stories is only compelling because of Jewett’s style, and would otherwise be viewed as descriptions of mundane occurrences. This lack of content, however, seemed to be the one negative point on which critics focused. The same review from Scribner's Monthly takes issue with Jewett's local color writing, citing its extreme simplicity and, perhaps, dullness. “Their substance is so slight that the reader may be excused if he yields to the temptation to skip.” While this critic disliked Jewett's naturalist style, many others found the simplicity charming.

== Other ==
Most of the stories in Old Friends and New take place in different areas of New England, likely inspired by the fact that Jewett was born and raised in Maine.

Lady Ferry was the one short story of the seven in this book that was not released to the public before Houghton, Osgood and Company compiled and published these stories.

In Miss Sydney’s Flowers, Mrs. Marley had trouble working due to her arthritis. This is likely inspired by Jewett's childhood diagnosis of rheumatoid arthritis.
