= The Country of the Pointed Firs =

Short story sequence

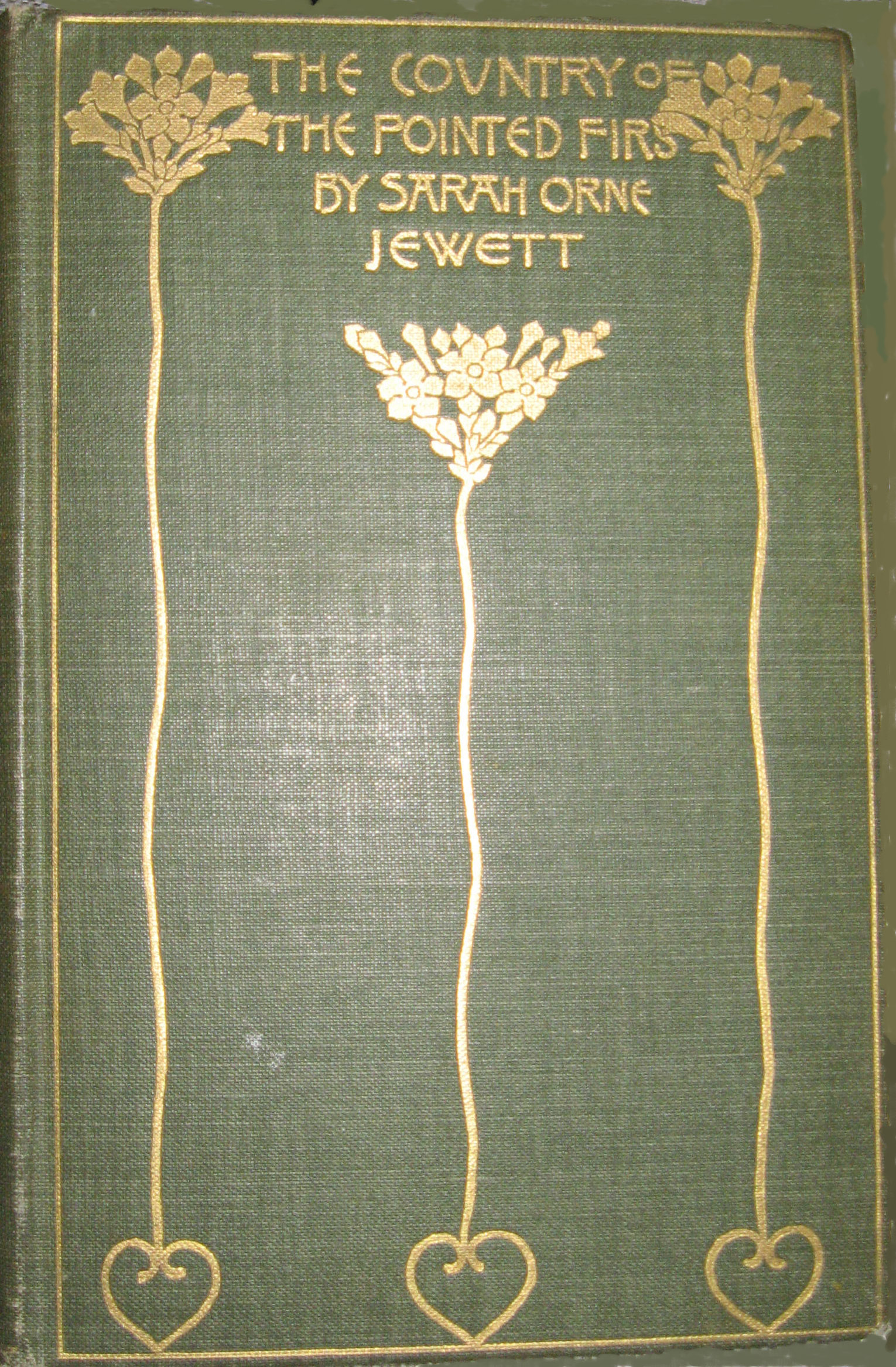
- First edition cover
- Author: Sarah Orne Jewett
- Language: English
- Genre: Novella; linked short stories
- Set in: Maine fishing village
- Published: 1896 (Houghton Mifflin)
- Publication place: United States
- Text: The Country of the Pointed Firs at Wikisource
- First serialized in The Atlantic Monthly

The Country of the Pointed Firs is an 1896 book by American writer Sarah Orne Jewett. It is considered by some literary critics to be her finest work.

== Plot ==
The narrator, a Bostonian, returns after a brief visit a few summers prior, to the small coastal town of Dunnet, Maine, in order to finish writing her book. Upon arriving she settles in with Almira Todd, a widow in her sixties and the local apothecary and herbalist. The narrator occasionally assists Mrs. Todd with her frequent callers, but this distracts her from her writing and she seeks a room of her own.

Renting an empty schoolhouse with a broad view of Dunnet Landing, the narrator can apparently concentrate on her writing, although Jewett does not use the schoolhouse to show the narrator at work but rather in meditation and receiving company. The schoolhouse is one of many locations in the novel which Jewett elevates to mythic significance and for the narrator the location is a center of writerly consciousness from which she makes journeys out and to which others make journeys in, aware of the force of the narrator's presence, out of curiosity, and out of respect for Almira Todd.

After a funeral, Captain Littlepage, an 80-year-old retired sailor, comes to the schoolhouse to visit the narrator because he knows Mrs. Todd. He tells a story about his time on the sea and she is noticeably bored so he begins to leave. She sees that she has offended him with her display of boredom, so she covers her tracks by asking him to tell her more of his story. The Captain's story, of his sea-travels and the strange journey he once had which he believes points to the existence of a geographic link between this world and the next in the Arctic Circle, cannot compare to the stories that Mrs. Todd, Mrs. Todd's brother and mother, and residents of Dunnet tell of their lives in Dunnet.

The narrator's friendship with Mrs. Todd strengthens over the course of the summer, and the narrator's appreciation of the Maine coastal town increases each day. Soon, Mrs. Todd brings the narrator out to Green Island, in order to meet her elderly mother, Mrs. Blackett, who is well-respected by all in town and the surrounding farms. Attending to her on the island is William, Mrs. Todd's brother, a solitary and shy older man who helps his mother tend the garden and catches fish for them in the surrounding waters. Although initially reluctant to meet new people, and clearly intimidated by his sister's large personality, William comes to appreciate the narrator and shows her all around Green Island. By the end of the visit, the narrator feels deeply welcomed by the Blacketts.

In July, Mrs. Todd anxiously prepares for a visit of unknown length from her old friend, Mrs. Fosdick, and the narrator worries that Mrs. Fosdick's arrival and stay in the house will disrupt the daily regularity she's become accustomed to, and alienate her from Mrs. Todd. But it turns out that all three women get along quite well, and spend evenings talking of friends and acquaintances in town, present and past. One of these tales centers on "poor Joanna," a girl they grew up with who, when left by her beau for another woman who lived further up the bay, retreats in sadness and penance to Shell-heap Island, a small deserted spot owned by her deceased father. Joanna ends up living the rest of her life on the island, fixing up the small cottage her father had built there, keeping chickens, tending a small garden, and harvesting clams on the shore. The Dunnet community doesn't know what to make of this, with some writing her off and others distressed and trying to convince her to return to town. Eventually her way of life is accepted, as if she were an anchorite living in hermitage, and some of the townspeople pass by the island and throw things like warm clothes, tools, and extra foodstuffs up onto the shore, but without disturbing her. Later in the book, the narrator impulsively asks Captain Bowden, who is escorting her in his boat near Shell-heap, to steer closer so she can go ashore. The narrator finds that only the stone foundation of the cottage still exists, yet there is a worn path through the field, which leads to Joanna's gravestone.

After Mrs. Fosdick has left, the narrator accompanies Mrs. Todd and Mrs. Blackett on a day-long trip to the Bowden family reunion, a grand event in the lives of people in Dunnet and the surrounding countryside, as most of them are related to the large Bowden clan by blood or marriage. The trip and reunion are the high point of the narrator's summer, and where she is fully accepted by the general community. After this, there are moments when the narrator begins to display a keen insight into the residents, especially when she befriends Elijah Tilley, an old fisherman lonely and widowed, who she had previously found taciturn and forbidding. Invited to his house one afternoon, she learns about his dearly loved dead wife, and as Elijah shows her around the house, the narrator feels she understands the story of their lives together and the depth of the dead woman's decency and character.

At the end of the summer, the narrator must depart, fearing she will find Boston a harsh, bitter place after her sojourn in Dunnet. Mrs. Todd is too moved to say a proper goodbye to her, and after saying a solitary, tender farewell to the schoolhouse and the town itself, the narrator boards the steamboat which will take her away. From its stern she looks back at Dunnet until the entire town disappears from view.

== Publication and response ==
The Country of the Pointed Firs was serialized in the January, March, July, and September 1896 issues of The Atlantic Monthly. Sarah Orne Jewett subsequently added two new chapters, "Along Shore" and "The Backward View", to an 1896 collected edition published by Houghton, Mifflin and Company. In 1910, Macy R. Jewett, Sarah's sister, authorized a 1910 edition, again published by Houghton, Mifflin and Company, that added three of Sarah's other short stories ("A Dunnet Shepherdess", "William's Wedding", and "The Queen's Twin"), initially published separately, as additional chapters. Writer Willa Cather continued to keep these stories in her 1925 Mayflower edition, though she changed the order of the chapters. Cather's version remained the definitive version of the novel throughout the twentieth century, but scholars such as Marco A. Portales and Deborah Carlin have argued that Jewett never intended to include these additional stories in her original text. More recent versions of the text have omitted the three additional chapters.

Henry James described it as her "beautiful little quantum of achievement." Ursula K. Le Guin praises its "quietly powerful rhythms." Because it is loosely structured, many critics view the book not as a novel, but a series of sketches; however, its structure is unified through both setting and theme. The novel can be read as a study of the effects of isolation and hardship experienced by the inhabitants of the decaying fishing villages along the Maine coast.

Jewett, who wrote the book when she was 47, was largely responsible for popularizing the regionalism genre with her sketches of the fictional Maine fishing village of Dunnet Landing. Like Jewett, the narrator is a woman, a writer, unattached, genteel in demeanor, intermittently feisty and zealously protective of her time to write. The narrator removes herself from her landlady's company and writes in an empty schoolhouse, but she also continues to spend a great deal of time with Mrs. Todd, befriending her hostess and her hostess's family and friends.
