= Rockin' Road Trip =

- Directed by: William Olsen
- Written by: William Olsen; Nancy Sterling
- Produced by: William Olsen; Michael Rothschild
- Starring: Leon Rippy; Martin Tucker; Pat Miller; Garth McLean; Katherine Harrison; Leland Gantt; Steve Boles; Margaret Currie
- Cinematography: Austin McKinney
- Edited by: David H. Lloyd
- Music by: Ricky Keller
- Distributed by: Troma Entertainment
- Release date: May 16, 1986; United States
- Running time: 101 minutes
- Language: English

Rockin' Road Trip (also known as Summer Time Blues) is a 1986 comedy film directed by William Olsen. The film is distributed by Troma Entertainment.

== Cast ==
- Margaret Currie as Nicole
- Steve Boles as Wally
- Leland Gantt as Curtis Smith
- Garth McLean as Martin
- Katherine Harrison as Samantha
- Graham Smith as Ivan the Angry Punk
- Martin Tucker as Lenny
