= Sarah Orne Jewett =

American novelist (1849–1909)

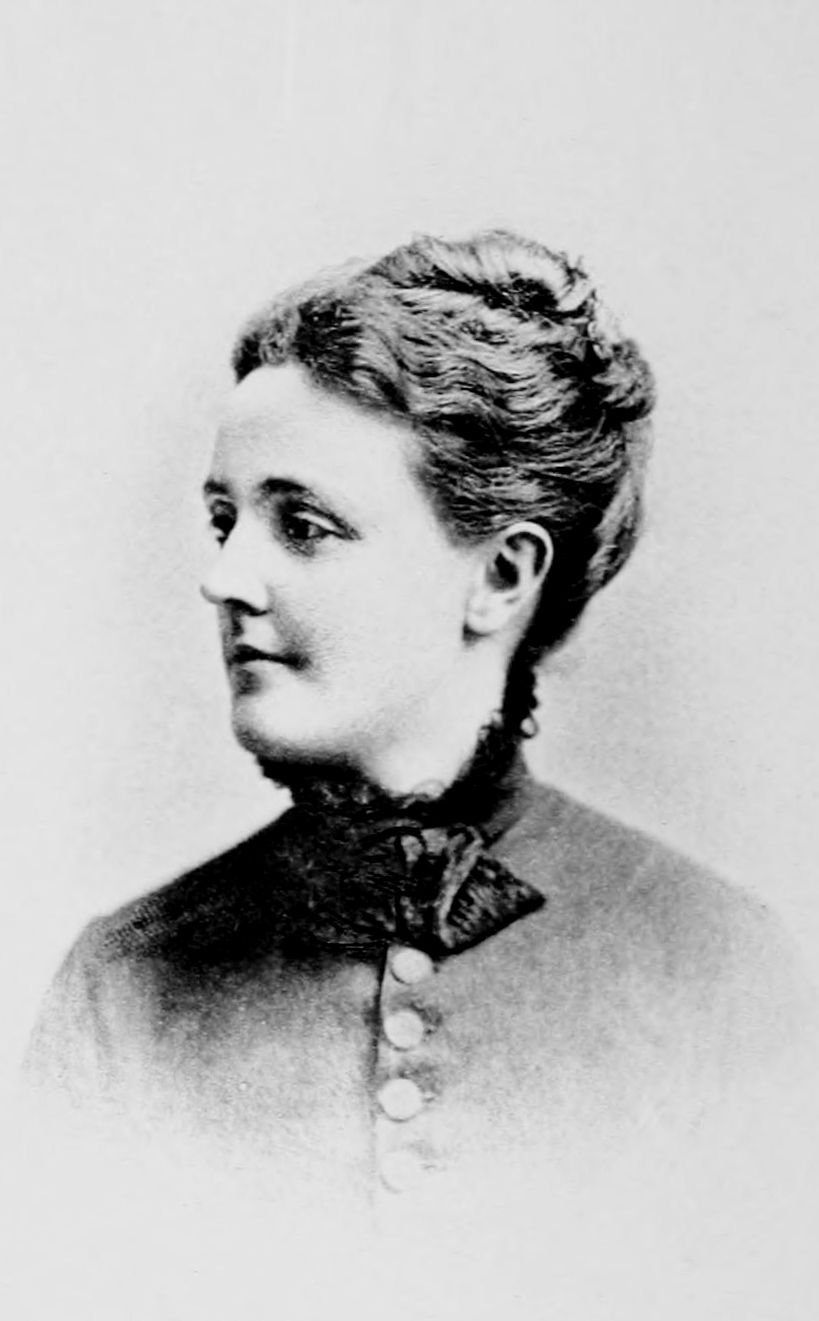
- Jewett in 1894
- Born: Theodora Sarah Orne Jewett; September 3, 1849; South Berwick, Maine, U.S.
- Died: June 24, 1909 (aged 59); South Berwick, Maine, U.S.
- Occupations: Novelist; short story writer
- Writing career
- Notable work: The Country of the Pointed Firs
- Movement: American literary regionalism

Signature
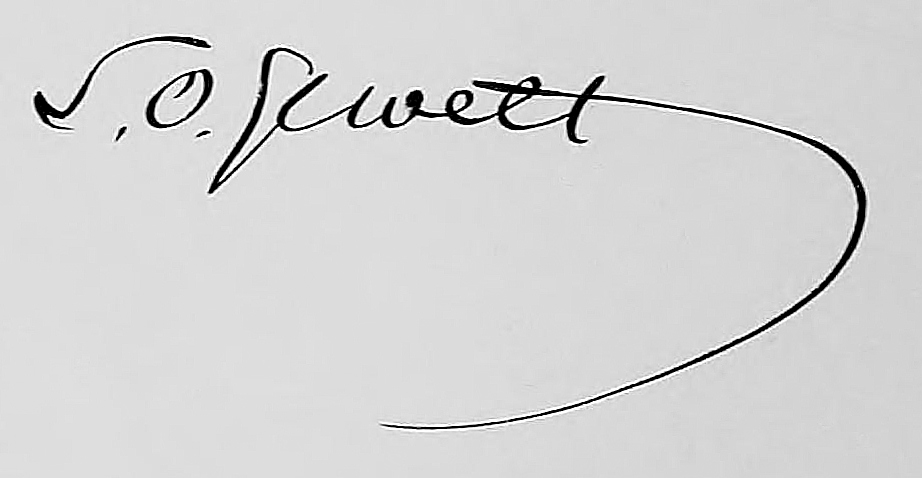

Theodora Sarah Orne Jewett (September 3, 1849 – June 24, 1909) was an American novelist, short story writer and poet, best known for her local color works set along or near the southern coast of Maine. Jewett is recognized as an important practitioner of American literary regionalism.

== Early life ==
Sarah Orne Jewett was born in South Berwick, Maine, on September 3, 1849. Her family had been residents of New England for many generations.

Jewett's father, Theodore Herman Jewett, was a doctor specializing in "obstetrics and diseases of women and children," and Jewett often accompanied him on his rounds, becoming acquainted with the sights and sounds of her native land and its people. Her mother was Caroline Frances (Perry). As treatment for rheumatoid arthritis, a condition that developed in her early childhood, Jewett was sent on frequent walks and through them also developed a love of nature. In later life, Jewett often visited Boston, where she was acquainted with many of the most influential literary figures of her day; but she always returned to South Berwick and to small seaports nearby which were the inspiration for the towns of "Deephaven" and "Dunnet Landing" in her stories.

Jewett was educated at Miss Olive Rayne's school and then at Berwick Academy, graduating in 1866. She supplemented her education with reading in her extensive family library. Jewett was "never overtly religious", but after she joined the Episcopal Church in 1871, she explored less conventional religious ideas. For example, her friendship with Harvard law professor Theophilus Parsons stimulated an interest in the teachings of Emanuel Swedenborg, an eighteenth-century Swedish scientist and theologian, who believed that the Divine "was present in innumerable, joined forms — a concept underlying Jewett's belief in individual responsibility."

== Career ==
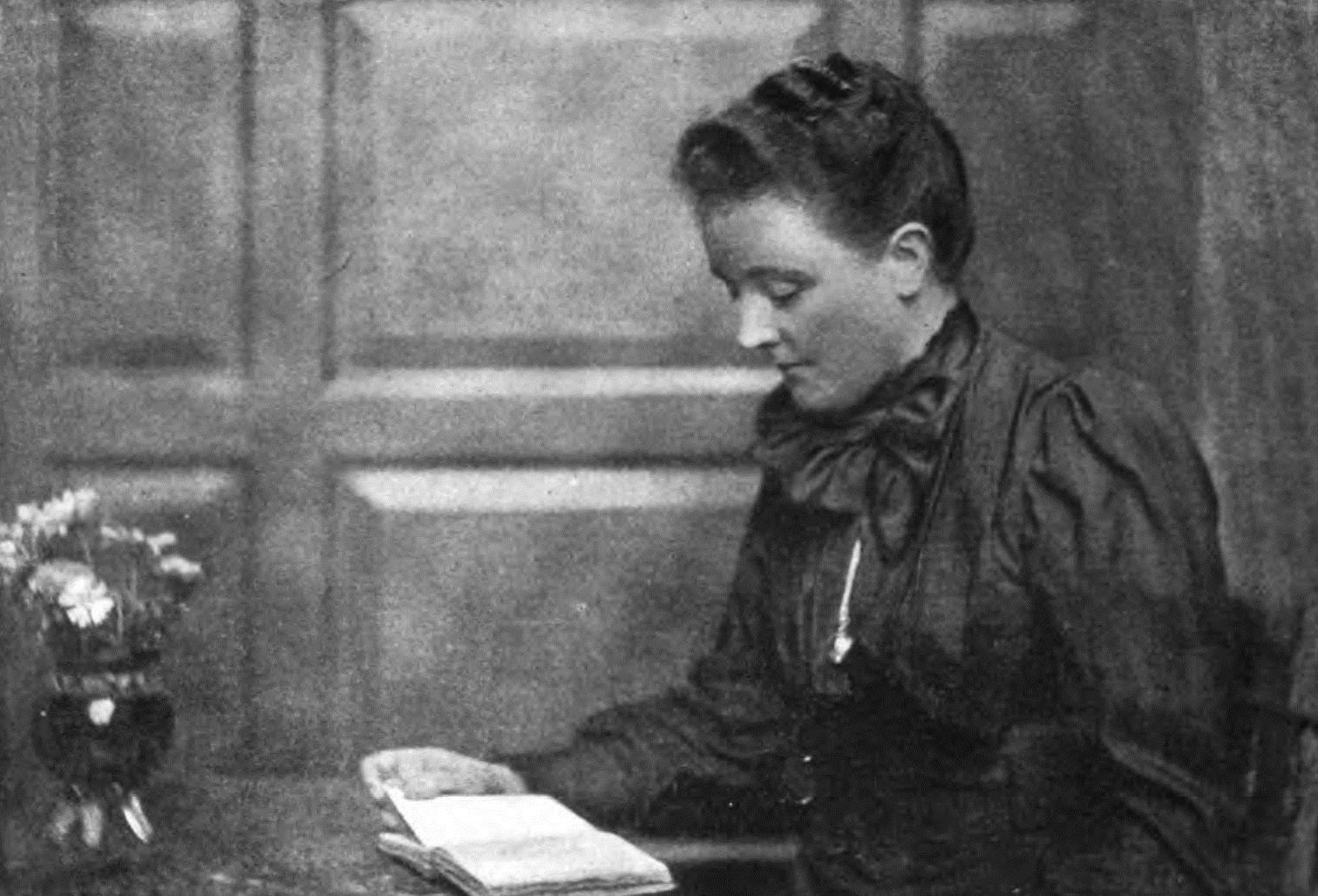
Sarah Orne Jewett reading.

In 1868 at age 18, Jewett published her first important story, "Jenny Garrow's Lovers," in The Flag of Our Union, and her reputation grew throughout the 1870s and 1880s. Jewett used the pen name "Alice Eliot" or "A. C. Eliot" for her early stories. Her literary importance arises from her careful, if subdued, vignettes of country life that reflect a contemporary interest in local color rather than in plot. Jewett possessed a keen descriptive gift that William Dean Howells called "an uncommon feeling for talk — I hear your people." Jewett made her reputation with the novella The Country of the Pointed Firs (1896). A Country Doctor (1884), a novel reflecting her father and her early ambitions for a medical career, and A White Heron (1886), a collection of short stories, are among her finest work. Some of Jewett's poetry was collected in Verses (1916), and she also wrote three children's books. Willa Cather described Jewett as a significant influence on her development as a writer, and "feminist critics have since championed her writing for its rich account of women's lives and voices." Cather dedicated her 1913 novel O Pioneers!, based upon memories of her childhood in Nebraska, to Jewett. In 1901 Bowdoin College conferred an honorary doctorate of literature on Jewett, the first woman to be granted an honorary degree by Bowdoin. In Jewett's obituary in 1909, The Boston Globe remarked on the strength that lay in "the detail of her work, in fine touches, in simplicity."

== Personal life ==
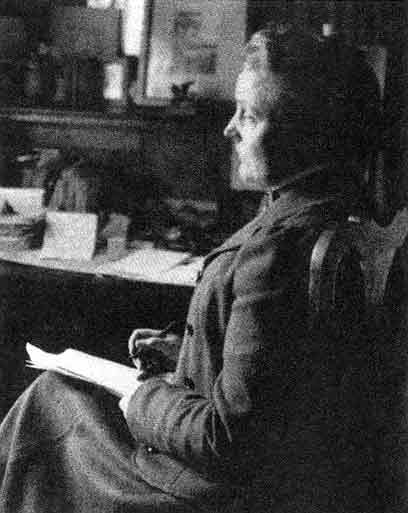
Sarah Orne Jewett.

Jewett's works featuring relationships between women often mirrored her own life and friendships. Jewett's letters and diaries reveal that as a young woman, Jewett had close relationships with several women, including Grace Gordon, Kate Birckhead, Georgie Halliburton, Ella Walworth, and Ellen Mason. For instance, from evidence in her diary, Jewett appears to have had an intense crush on Kate Birckhead. Jewett later established a close friendship with writer Annie Adams Fields (1834–1915) and her husband, publisher James T. Fields, editor of the Atlantic Monthly.

After the sudden death of James Fields in 1881, Jewett paid a condolence visit to Annie Fields. Fields found solace in subsequent visits from Jewett and their relationship grew. Jewett and Fields began living together in what was then termed a "Boston marriage" in Fields's homes in Manchester-by-the-Sea, MA, and at 148 Charles Street in Boston. Though some scholars have offered a cautious appraisal of the nature of the relationship between Jewett and Fields, modern scholarship documents evidence that Jewett and Fields considered themselves married in a relationship lasting until Jewett's death nearly thirty years later. Jewett and Fields exchanged rings and vows, and on the one-year anniversary of their vows, Jewett wrote a poem, "Do You Remember, Darling," depicting her commitment to and love of Fields.

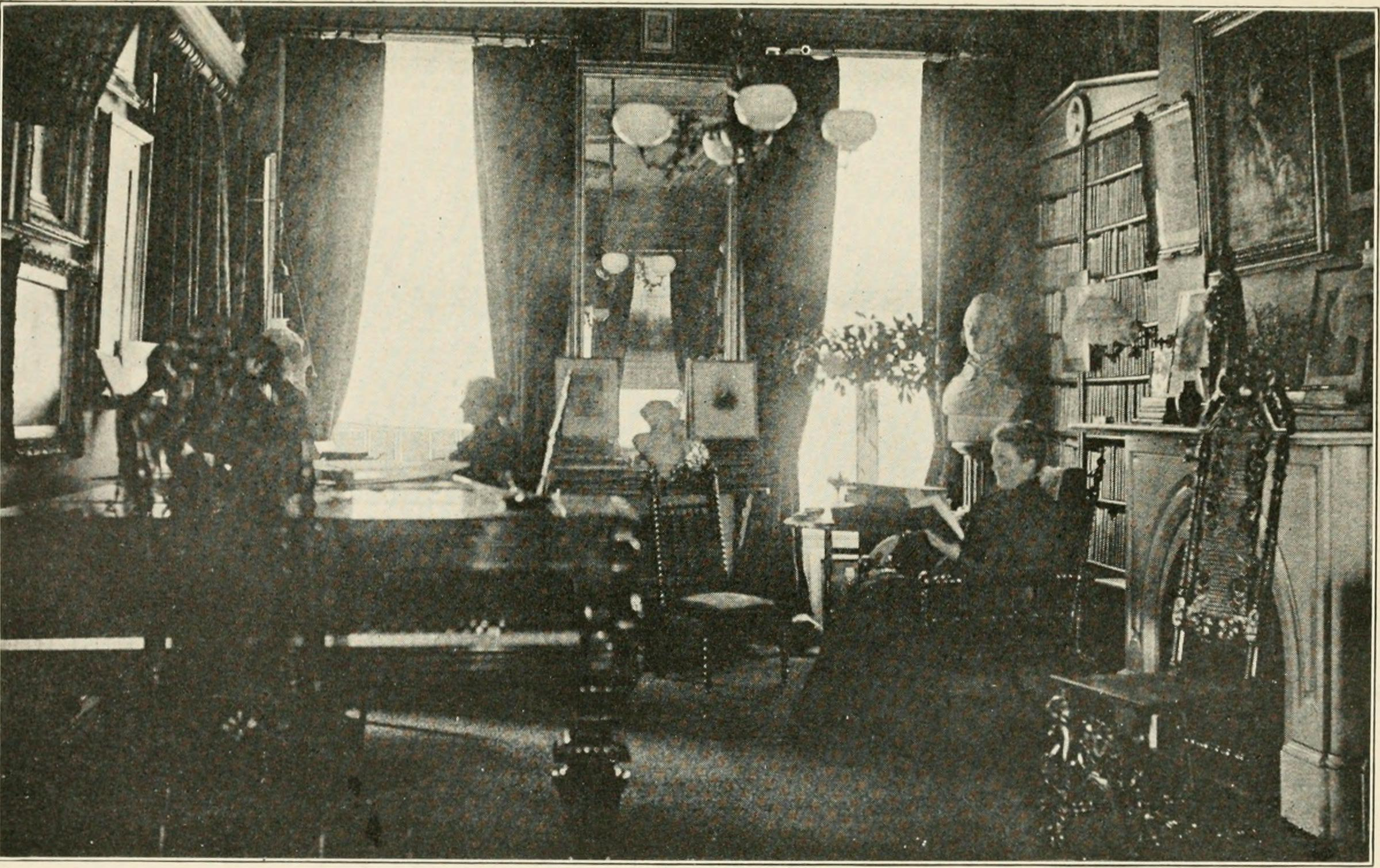
Annie Adams Fields and Sarah Orne Jewett in the library of their shared 148 Charles Street home.

Jewett and Fields socialized with other women in "Boston marriages." Both women "found friendship, humor, and literary encouragement" in one another's company, traveling to Europe together and hosting "American and European literati." In Boston, the two were part of a social circle which included Willa Cather, Sarah W. Whitman, and Alice James, among others. In France Jewett met Thérèse Blanc-Bentzon with whom she had long corresponded and who translated some of her stories for publication in France. Jewett's poetry, much of it unpublished, includes approximately thirty love poems or fragments of poems written to women which illustrate the intensity of her feelings toward them. Jewett also wrote about romantic attachments between women in her novel Deephaven (1877), which described her relationship with Annie Adams Fields, and in her short story "Martha's Lady" (1897).

On September 3, 1902, Jewett was injured in a carriage accident that all but ended her writing career. She was paralyzed by a stroke in March 1909, and she died in her South Berwick home after suffering another stroke on June 24, 1909.

Annie Adams Fields published her correspondence with Jewett in 1911. Women in Boston marriages in the 19th century most often kept their correspondence private or destroyed it, so the survival and publication of Jewett and Fields' letters provides rare documentation of one of the most famous Boston marriages of the time. Fields edited the correspondence to remove more personal information leading some biographers to describe Jewett and Fields's relationship as a friendship, but the correspondence depicts their deep love for each other.

== Jewett House ==
The Sarah Orne Jewett House, the Georgian home of the Jewett family, built in 1774 and overlooking Central Square at South Berwick, is a National Historic Landmark and Historic New England museum. Jewett and her sister Mary inherited the house in 1887.

== In popular culture ==
The 2019 film The Lighthouse based the down-east accent of character Ephraim Winslow (played by Robert Pattinson) on Jewett's phonetic transcription of period speech in southern Maine.

American-British author Henry James was inspired by Annie Fields and Sarah Orne Jewett's relationship when writing his 1886 novel The Bostonians.

She was featured on a United States Postage Stamp in 2026.

== Selected works ==
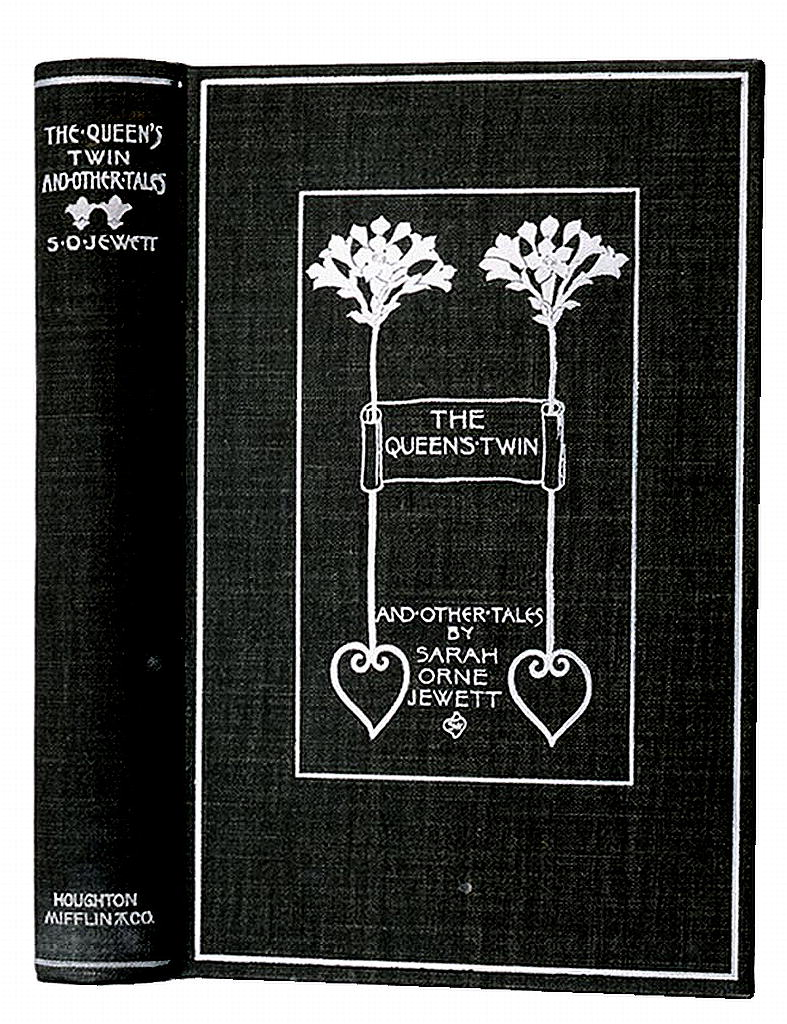
Cover, Jewett's The Queen's Twin and Other Tales, Houghton Mifflin, 1899

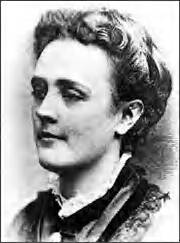
Sarah Orne Jewett.

=== Novels ===
- Deephaven, James R. Osgood, 1877
- A Country Doctor, Houghton-Mifflin, 1884
- A Marsh Island, Houghton-Mifflin, 1885
- Betty Leicester: A Story for Girls, Houghton-Mifflin, 1890
- Betty Leicester's English Christmas: A New Chapter of an Old Story, privately printed for the Bryn Mawr School, 1894
- The Country of the Pointed Firs, Houghton-Mifflin, 1896
- The Tory Lover, Houghton-Mifflin, 1901

=== Short story and short fiction collections ===
- Play Days, Houghton, Osgood, 1878
- Old Friends and New, Houghton, Osgood, 1879
- Country By-Ways, Houghton-Mifflin, 1881
- Katy's Birthday with Other Stories, 1883
- The Mate of the Daylight, and Friends Ashore, Houghton-Mifflin, 1884
- A White Heron and Other Stories, Houghton-Mifflin, 1886
- The King of Folly Island and Other People, Houghton-Mifflin, 1888
- Tales of New England, Houghton-Mifflin, 1890
- Strangers and Wayfarers, Houghton-Mifflin, 1890
- A Native of Winby and Other Tales, Houghton-Mifflin, 1893
- The Life of Nancy, Houghton-Mifflin, 1895
- The Queen's Twin and Other Stories, Houghton-Mifflin, 1899
- An Empty Purse: A Christmas Story, privately printed, 1905

=== Poetry ===
- Verses, 1916

=== Non-fiction ===
- The Story of the Normans, Told Chiefly in Relation to Their Conquest of England, G.P. Putnam's Sons, 1887
