= Eliza Byard =

American film producer

- Born: 8 March 1968 (age 58); New York City, United States
- Occupation: Executive director of GLSEN
- Partner: Eva Kolodner

Eliza Byard is an American nonprofit director. She was the executive director of GLSEN before stepping down on March 1, 2021. She also previously worked as a filmmaker.

== Life ==
Eliza Byard was born in New York City on 8 March 1968. Her mother Rosalie is an English as a second language teacher at the Kaplan International Center, and her father Paul is an architect and director of historical preservation courses at Columbia University's School of Architecture, Planning and Preservation. When Eliza was thirteen, she worked as an intern at the New York City public television station WNET. Eliza Byard attended Yale University and later Columbia, where she received her master's and doctorate degrees in United States history.

In 2004, Byard had a commitment ceremony with her partner, Eva Kolodner, a film producer.

== Career ==
Early in Byard's career she served as the director of development for the Center for Investigative Reporting. In 1996 she became the editor, writer, and co-producer of the film Out of the Past, which was published in 1997. It premiered at the Sundance Film Festival in 1998, where it won the Audience Award for Best Documentary. While working on the film she met Kevin Jennings, the founder and then executive director of GLSEN.

Byard joined GLSEN as deputy executive director in 2001, where she led the development of programs including the national Think B4 You Speak anti-bullying program, LGBT ad campaigns, and GLSEN's research and student organization efforts. In 2008 she became the organization's executive director. Byard announced on January 13, 2021 that she would be stepping down as executive director on March 1, 2021.

Byard also serves on the board of trustees for America's Promise Alliance, Sodexo's diversity advisory board, the National Collaboration for Youth steering committee, and the National Action Alliance for Suicide Prevention LGBT suicide task force. She also served on Michael Bloomberg's commission for runaway and homeless children, and was the chair of the board of directors for Arts Engine.
