= A White Heron =

- Short story by Sarah Orne Jewett
- Country: United States
- Language: English
- Genre: Romance/Realism

Publication
- Publisher: Houghton, Mifflin and Company
- Media type: Print
- Publication date: 1886

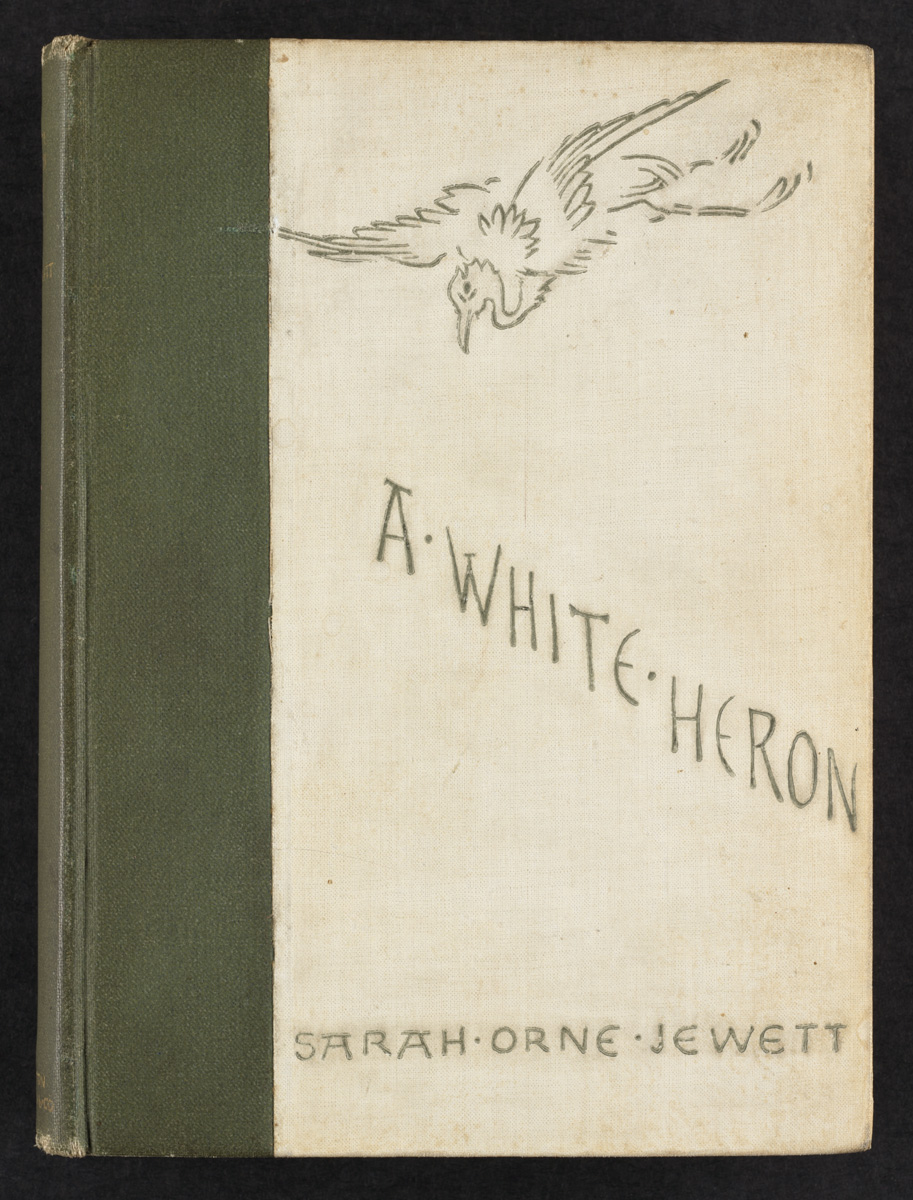
A White Heron and Other Stories, 1886

"A White Heron" is a short story by Sarah Orne Jewett. First published by Houghton, Mifflin and Company in 1886, it was soon collected as the title story in Jewett's anthology A White Heron and Other Stories. It follows a young city girl named Sylvia who comes to live with her grandmother in the country. She meets a young ornithologist hunter seeking to find a rare bird that he recently spotted in the area. As the story progresses, Sylvia is challenged with whether or not she should tell the hunter she saw the bird. She also discovers her passion for country life and her love and values for the animals that inhabit it.

== Plot summary ==
Sylvia has come from the city to live in the Maine woods with her grandmother, Mrs. Tilley. As the story begins, Sylvia has been living with her grandmother for nearly a year, learning to adapt to country ways. She helps the old woman by taking over some of the more manual jobs, such as finding Mistress Moolly, the cow, each evening in the fields where she grazes and bringing her home. By means of this and other tasks, along with her explorations in the forest, Sylvia has become a country girl who dearly loves her new home. She has taken to it easily and immerses herself in her new life completely, as evidenced by the description of her journey home each evening with the cow: “Their feet were familiar with the path, and it was no matter whether their eyes could see it or not.”

One evening she is approached by a hunter, who is in the area looking for birds to shoot and preserve for his collection. This young man is searching in particular for the rare white heron, and he is sure that it makes its nest in the vicinity. He accompanies Sylvia on her way with hopes of spending the night at her grandmother’s house. Once he has received this invitation, he makes himself at home. After they eat, he says that he will give a sum of money to anyone who can lead him to the white heron. The next day Sylvia accompanies the hunter into the forest as he searches for the bird’s nest, but he does not find it.

Early the following morning, the girl decides to go out and look for the bird by herself so that she can be sure of showing the hunter its exact location when he awakes. She decides to climb the tallest tree in the forest so that she can see the entire countryside, and she finds the heron, just as she had thought she would. When Sylvia climbs the tree as a bird might, she arrives at an epiphany at the tree's top. High as a bird, she has broken free of the world beneath and "becomes" the heron. But Sylvia is so affected by her leaf-top observation of the heron and other wildlife that she cannot bring herself to disclose the heron's location to the hunter after all, despite his entreaties. Sylvia knows that she would be awarded much-needed money for directing him to the heron, but she decides that she can play no part in bringing about the bird's death.

The hunter eventually departs without his prize. Sylvia grows up to ponder if her choice to conceal the heron's secret was a better choice than to receive the young man's money and friendship. The author states that the treasures Sylvia might have lost are easily forgotten among the splendors of the woodland.

== Major themes ==
"A White Heron" can be thought of as a starting point for both ecological, nature-ethical literature in the US, and questioning the undoubted positive development of the US. The author explores many ecological themes including the freedom of nature, a return to nature, emancipation from materialism, and industrialism. Other themes explored include the hesitation of actions that might counteract the proceeding industrialization and the recollection of the individual human being as the important actor in society.

This book can also be thought of as an example of New England feminist literature and an example of "New England Realism" (cf.: William Dean Howells).

=== Feminism ===
Since the rise of feminist literary criticism around the 1960s, more research has focused on the themes of how the female experience is presented in "A White Heron". Research by George Held has identified themes such as, “the socialization of girls, the balance of power between the sexes, and the need for a woman to be true to her nature". The influence of the female experience in this work being represented by the strength and independence of the main character has been connected to imitating a traditional hero character, more often depicted as male . This challenging of traditional roles of power argues the importance of the female voice and provides an empowering perspective on the female experience.

The protagonist in “A White Heron” can be seen as an example of a woman of power and embodying heroism. Some criticism has even acknowledged the fact that the main character of the story may have been loosely based on Jewett's life growing up. Losing her father encouraged a need to be a strong and powerful young girl. She created a character who expressed the female voice of the women of her time in a new perspective than traditionally published works.
