= Suicidal ideation =

Thoughts, ideas, or ruminations about attempting suicide

- Other names: Suicidal thoughts, suicidal ideas
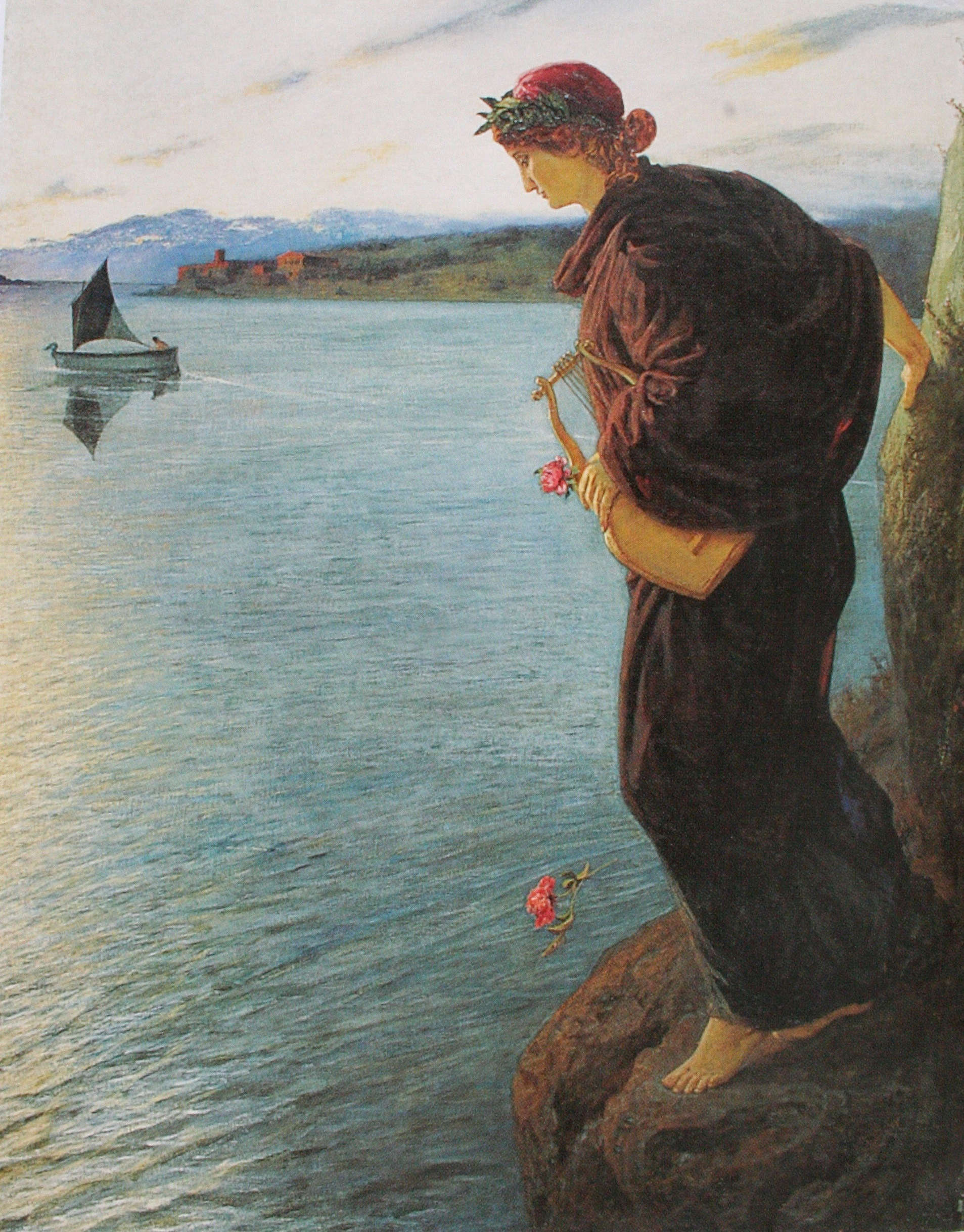
- Sappho, an 1897 portrait by Ernst Stückelberg
- Specialty: Psychiatry, psychology, emergency medicine
- Risk factors: Mental disorders, stressful life events, family history, child abuse, certain medications (including SSRIs and benzodiazepines), poor parent–child relationship during adolescence

Suicidal ideation, or suicidal thoughts, is the thought process of having ideas or ruminations about the possibility of dying by suicide. It is not a diagnosis but is a symptom of some mental disorders, use of certain psychoactive drugs, and can also occur in response to adverse life circumstances without the presence of a mental disorder.

On suicide risk scales, the range of suicidal ideation varies from fleeting thoughts to detailed planning. Passive suicidal ideation is thinking about not wanting to live or imagining being dead. Active suicidal ideation involves preparation to kill oneself or forming a plan to do so.

Most people who have suicidal thoughts do not go on to make suicide attempts, but suicidal thoughts are considered a risk factor. During 2008–09, an estimated 8.3 million adults aged 18 and over in the United States, or 3.7% of the adult U.S. population, reported having suicidal thoughts in the previous year, while an estimated 2.2 million reported having made suicide plans in the previous year. In 2019, 12 million U.S. adults seriously thought about suicide, 3.5 million planned a suicide attempt, 1.4 million attempted suicide, and more than 47,500 died by suicide. Suicidal thoughts are also common among teenagers.

Suicidal ideation is associated with depression and other mood disorders; however, many other mental disorders, life events and family events can increase the risk of suicidal ideation. Mental health researchers indicate that healthcare systems should provide treatment for individuals with suicidal ideation, regardless of diagnosis, because of the risk for suicidal acts and repeated problems associated with suicidal thoughts. There are a number of treatment options for people who experience suicidal ideation.

== Definitions ==
The ICD-11 describes suicidal ideation as "thoughts, ideas, or ruminations about the possibility of ending one's life, ranging from thinking that one would be better off dead to formulation of elaborate plans".

The DSM-5 defines it as "thoughts about self-harm, with deliberate consideration or planning of possible techniques of causing one's own death".

The U.S. Centers for Disease Control and Prevention defines suicidal ideation as "thinking about, considering, or planning suicide".

== Terminology ==
Another term for suicidal ideation is suicidal thoughts.

When someone who has not shown a history of suicidal ideation experiences a sudden and pronounced thought of performing an act which would necessarily lead to their own death, psychologists call this an intrusive thought. A commonly experienced example of this is the high place phenomenon, also referred to as the call of the void, which is a sudden urge to jump when in a high place.

A euphemism for suicidal ideation is internal struggle, while voluntary death and eating one's gun are a synonym and a euphemism, respectively, for suicide itself.

== Risk factors ==
The risk factors for suicidal ideation can be divided into three categories: psychiatric disorders, life events, and family history.

=== Mental disorders ===
Suicidal ideation is a symptom of many mental disorders but can also occur in response to adverse life events without the presence of a mental disorder.

There are several psychiatric disorders that appear to be comorbid with suicidal ideation or considerably increase the risk of suicidal ideation. For example, many individuals with borderline personality disorder exhibit recurrent suicidal behavior and suicidal thoughts. One study found that 73% of patients with borderline personality disorder have attempted suicide, with the average patient having 3.4 attempts. The following list includes the disorders that have been shown to be the strongest predictors of suicidal ideation. These are not the only disorders that can increase the risk of suicidal ideation. The disorders where the risk is increased the greatest, in arbitrary order, include:

- Mood disorders
  - Major depressive disorder
  - Persistent depressive disorder
  - Bipolar disorder
  - Premenstrual dysphoric disorder
- Anxiety disorders
- Neurodevelopmental disorders
  - Attention deficit hyperactivity disorder
  - Autism
- Post-traumatic stress disorder
  - Complex post-traumatic stress disorder
- Personality disorders
  - Borderline personality disorder
- Psychosis (Detachment from reality)
- Paranoia
- Schizophrenia
- Substance use disorders
- Nightmare disorder
- Gender dysphoria
- Conduct disorder
- Learning disorders
  - Specific learning disorder
- Obsessive–compulsive disorder
- Eating disorders
  - Anorexia
  - Binge eating disorder
  - Bulimia

=== Life events ===
Life events are strong predictors of increased risk for suicidal ideation. Furthermore, life events can also lead to or be comorbid with the previously listed psychiatric disorders and predict suicidal ideation through those means. Life events that adults and children face can be dissimilar, and for this reason, the list of events that increase risk can vary in adults and children. Recent sociological work has increasingly emphasised meaning, culture, and meso-level mechanisms in explanations of suicide. The life events that have been shown to increase risk most significantly are:

- Alcohol use disorder
  - Studies have shown that individuals who binge drink, rather than drink socially, tend to have higher rates of suicidal ideation
  - Certain studies associate those who experience suicidal ideation with higher alcohol consumption
  - Not only do some studies show that solitary binge drinking can increase suicidal ideation, but there is also a positive feedback relationship causing those who have more suicidal ideation to have more drinks per day in a solitary environment
- Minoritized gender expression and/or sexuality or being a minority group of any kind
- Unemployment
- Chronic illness or pain
- Death of family members or friends
- End of a relationship or being rejected by a romantic interest
- Major change in life standard (e.g., relocation abroad)
- Other studies have found that tobacco use is correlated with depression and suicidal ideation
- Social isolation
- Unintended pregnancy
- Bullying
  - Cyberbullying
  - Workplace bullying
- Previous suicide attempts
  - Having previously attempted suicide is one of the strongest indicators of future suicidal ideation or suicide attempts
- Military experience
  - Military personnel who show symptoms of PTSD, major depressive disorder, alcohol use disorder, and generalized anxiety disorder show higher levels of suicidal ideation
- Community violence
- Undesired changes in body weight
  - Women: increased BMI increases the chance of suicidal ideation
  - Men: severe decrease in BMI increases the chance of suicidal ideation
    - In general, the obese population has increased odds of suicidal ideation in relation to individuals that are of average-weight
- Exposure and attention to suicide related images or words

=== Family history ===
- Parents with a history of depression
  - Valenstein et al. studied 340 adults whose parents had experienced depression. They found that 7% of the offspring had suicidal ideation in the previous month alone
- Abuse
  - Childhood: physical, emotional, and sexual abuse
  - Adolescence: physical, emotional, and sexual abuse
- Family violence
- Childhood residential instability
  - Certain studies associate those who experience suicidal ideation with family disruption

=== Medication side effects ===
Antidepressant medications are commonly used to decrease the symptoms in patients with moderate to severe clinical depression, and some studies indicate a connection between suicidal thoughts and tendencies and taking antidepressants, increasing the risk of suicidal thoughts in some patients.

Some medications, such as selective serotonin reuptake inhibitors (SSRIs), can have suicidal ideation as a side effect but can also be effective as antidepressants. Monitoring is advised for those who take SSRIs.

In 2003, the U.S. Food and Drug Administration (FDA) issued the agency's strictest warning for manufacturers of all antidepressants (including tricyclic antidepressants [TCAs] and monoamine oxidase inhibitors) due to their association with suicidal thoughts and behaviors. Further studies disagree with the warning, especially when prescribed for adults, claiming more recent studies are inconclusive in the connection between the drugs and suicidal ideation.

Individuals with anxiety disorders who self-medicate with drugs or alcohol may also have an increased likelihood of suicidal ideation.

Most people are under the influence of sedative-hypnotic drugs (such as alcohol or benzodiazepines) when they die by suicide, with alcoholism present in between 15 and 61% of cases. Use of prescribed benzodiazepines is associated with an increased rate of suicide and attempted suicide. The pro-suicidal effects of benzodiazepines are suspected to be due to a psychiatric disturbance caused by side effects, such as disinhibition, or withdrawal symptoms.

=== Relationships with parents ===
According to a study conducted by Ruth X. Liu of San Diego State University, a significant connection was found between the parent–child relationships of adolescents in early, middle, and late adolescence and their likelihood of suicidal ideation. The study consisted of measuring relationships between mothers and daughters, fathers and sons, mothers and sons, and fathers and daughters. The relationships between fathers and sons during early and middle adolescence show an inverse relationship to suicidal ideation. Closeness with the father in late adolescence is "significantly related to suicidal ideation". Liu goes on to explain the relationship found between closeness with the opposite sex parent and the child's risk of suicidal thoughts. It was found that boys are better protected from suicidal ideation if they are close to their mothers through early and late adolescence; whereas girls are better protected by having a close relationship with their fathers during middle adolescence.

An article published in 2010 by Zappulla and Pace found that suicidal ideation in adolescent boys is exacerbated by detachment from the parents when depression is already present in the child. Lifetime prevalence estimates of suicidal ideation among nonclinical populations of adolescents generally range from 60 to 75% and in many cases its severity increases the risk of suicide. Parents who are unaccepting of their child's expressed LGBTQ sexuality create a hotbed for suicidal ideation (see under LGBTQ youth below).

== Prevention ==
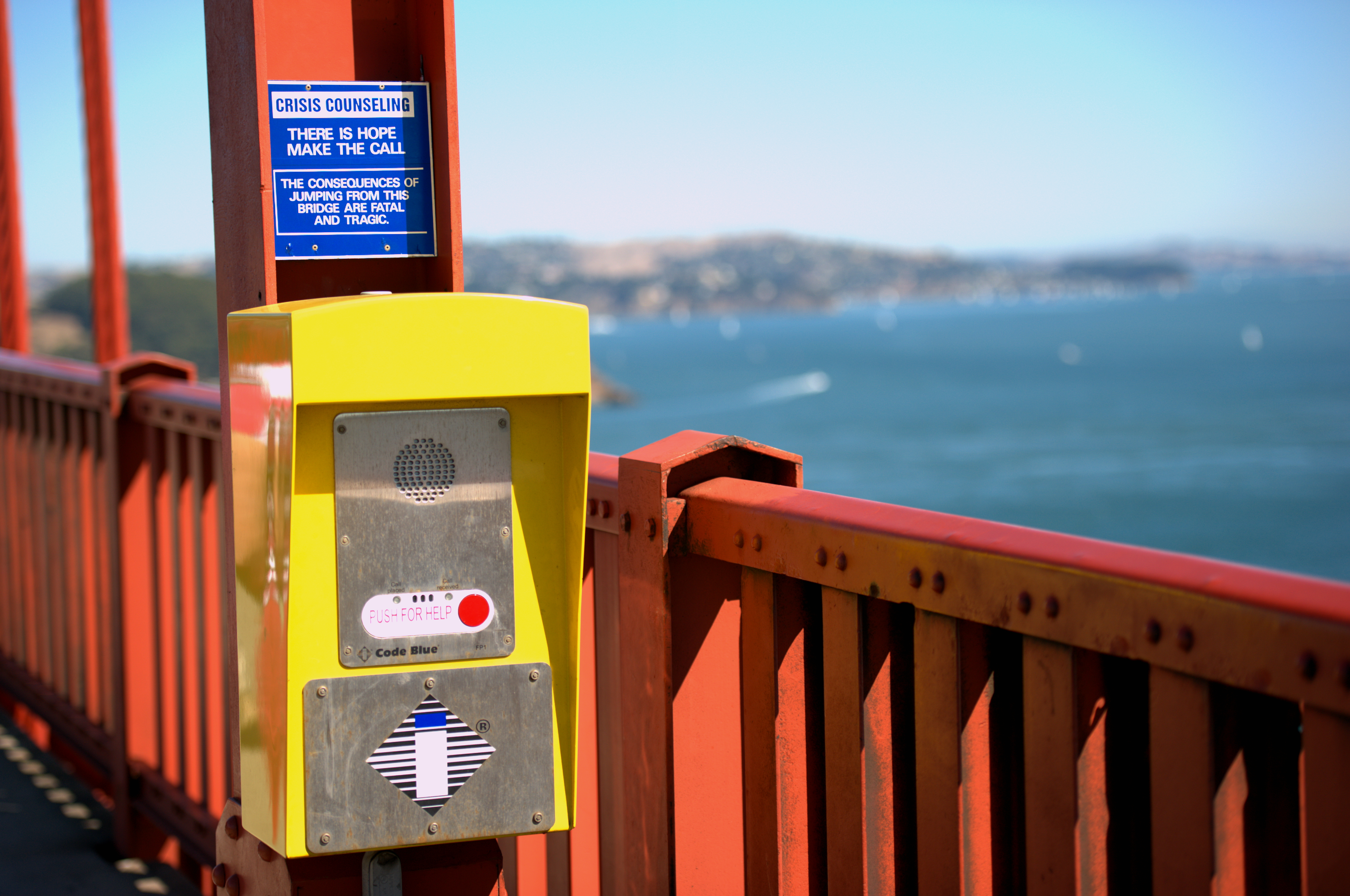
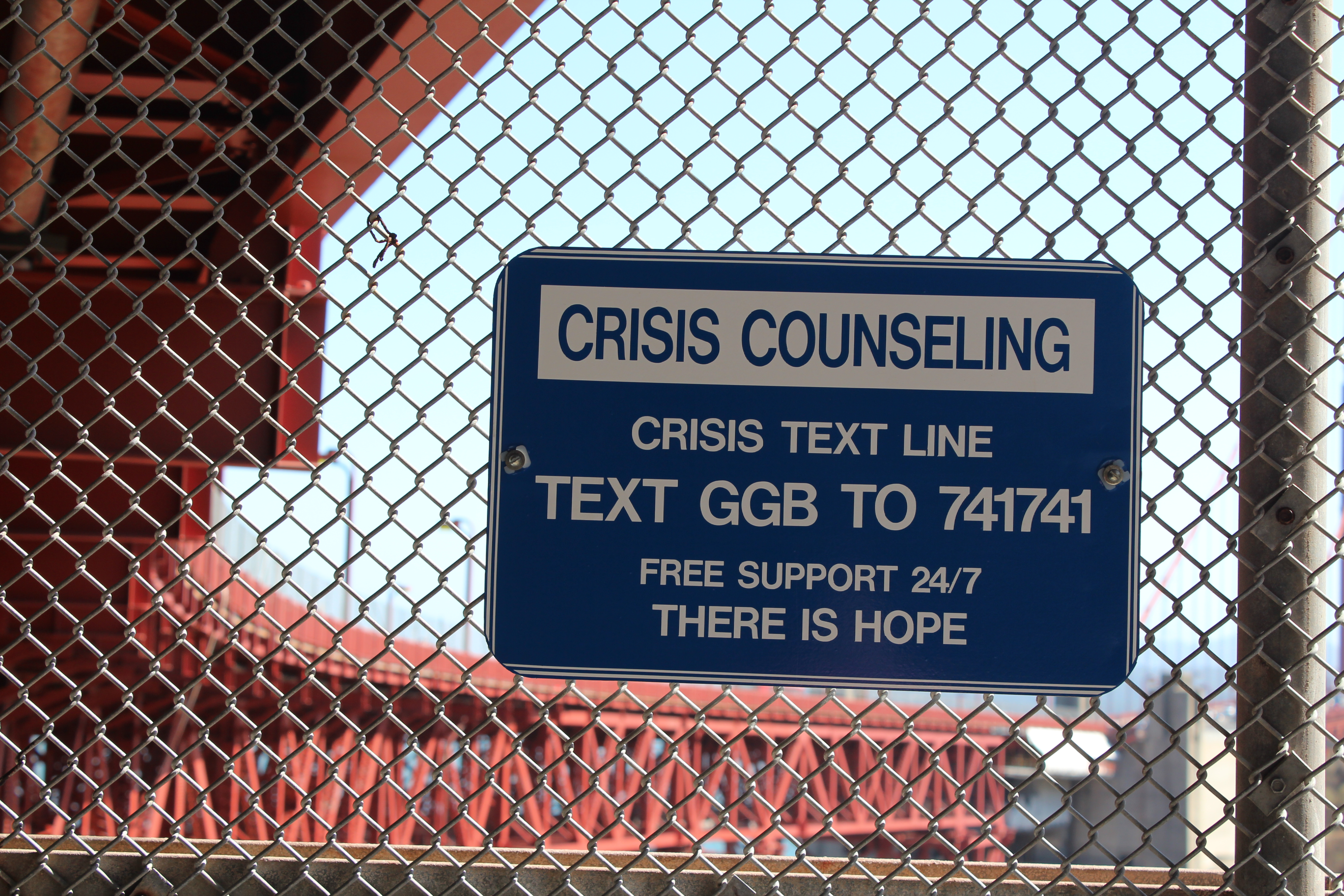
As a suicide prevention initiative, these signs on the Golden Gate Bridge promote a special telephone that connects to a crisis hotline, as well as a 24/7 crisis text line.

Crisis hotlines, such as the National Suicide Prevention Lifeline, (988) enable people to get immediate emergency telephone counselling.

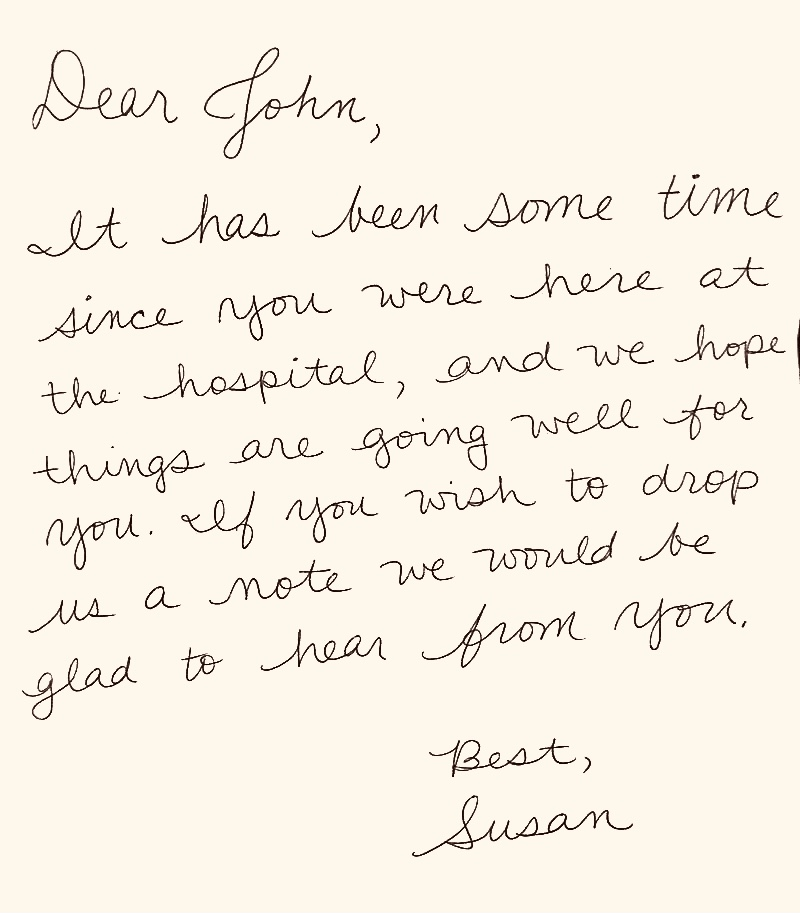
A caring letter written by hand

Early detection and treatment are the best ways to prevent suicidal ideation and suicide attempts. If signs, symptoms, or risk factors are detected early then the individual might seek treatment and help before attempting to take their life. In a study of individuals who died by suicide, 91% of them likely had at least one mental illness. However, only 35% of those individuals were treated or are being treated for a mental illness. This emphasizes the importance of early detection; if a mental illness is detected, it can be treated and controlled to help prevent suicide attempts. Another study investigated strictly suicidal ideation in adolescents. This study found that depression symptoms in adolescents as early as 9th grade is a predictor of suicidal ideation. Most people with long-term suicidal ideation do not seek professional help.

The previously mentioned studies point out the difficulty that mental health professionals have in motivating individuals to seek and continue treatment. Ways to increase the number of individuals who seek treatment may include:

- Increasing the availability of therapy treatment in early stage
- Increasing the public's knowledge of when psychiatric help may be beneficial to them
  - Those who have adverse life conditions seem to have just as much risk of suicide as those with mental illness

A study conducted by researchers in Australia set out to determine a course of early detection for suicidal ideation in teens stating that "risks associated with suicidality require an immediate focus on diminishing self-harming cognitions so as to ensure safety before attending to the underlying aetiology of the behavior". A Psychological Distress scale known as the K10 was administered monthly to a random sample of individuals. According to the results among the 9.9% of individuals who reported "psychological distress (all categories)" 5.1% of the same participants reported suicidal ideation. Participants who scored "very high" on the Psychological Distress scale "were 77 times more likely to report suicidal ideation than those in the low category".

In a one-year study conducted in Finland, 41% of the patients who later died by suicide saw a healthcare professional, most seeing a psychiatrist. Of those, only 22% discussed suicidal intent on their last office visit. In most of the cases, the office visit took place within a week of the suicide, and most of the victims had a diagnosed depressive disorder. However, in Chinese and American samples of those who died by suicide, 37% and over 50%, respectively, were not diagnosed with a psychiatric disorder prior to their deaths. Therefore, some have advocated for a suicide-specific diagnosis. Proposed for inclusion in the Diagnostic and Statistical Manual of Mental Disorders, the Suicide Crisis Syndrome (SCS) was developed by Igor Galynker in 2017 to detect an acute pre-suicidal state that does not include or rely on self-disclosure of suicidal ideation.

There are many centers where one can receive aid in the fight against suicidal ideation and suicide. Hemelrijk et al. (2012) found evidence that assisting people with suicidal ideation via the internet versus more direct forms such as phone conversations has a greater effect. In a 2021 research study, Nguyen et al. (2021) propose that maybe the premise that suicidal ideation is a kind of illness has been an obstacle to dealing with suicidal ideation. They use a Bayesian statistical investigation, in conjunction with the mindsponge theory, to explore the processes where mental disorders have played a very minor role and conclude that there are many cases where the suicidal ideation represents a type of cost-benefit analysis for a life/death consideration, and these people may not be called "patients".

== Assessment ==
Assessment seeks to understand an individual by integrating information from multiple sources such as clinical interviews; medical exams and physiological measures; standardized psychometric tests and questionnaires; structured diagnostic interviews; review of records; and collateral interviews.

=== Interviews ===
Psychologists, psychiatrists, and other mental health professionals conduct clinical interviews to ascertain the nature of a patient or client's difficulties, including any signs or symptoms of illness the person might exhibit. Clinical interviews are "unstructured" in the sense that each clinician develops a particular approach to asking questions without necessarily following a predefined format. Structured (or semi-structured) interviews prescribe the questions, their order of presentation, "probes" (queries) if a patient's response is not clear or specific enough, and a method to rate the frequency and intensity of symptoms.

=== Standardized psychometric measures ===
- Beck Scale for Suicide Ideation
- Nurses' Global Assessment of Suicide Risk
- Suicidal Affect–Behavior–Cognition Scale (SABCS)
- Columbia Suicide Severity Rating Scale

== Management ==
Treatment of suicidal ideation can be problematic due to the fact that several medications have actually been linked to increasing or causing suicidal ideation in patients. Therefore, several alternative means of treating suicidal ideation are often used. The main treatments include: therapy, hospitalization, outpatient treatment, and medication or other modalities.

=== Therapy ===
In psychotherapy, a person explores the issues that make them feel suicidal and learns skills to help manage emotions more effectively.

=== Hospitalization ===
Hospitalization allows the patient to be in a secure, supervised environment to prevent suicidal ideation from turning into suicide attempts. In most cases, individuals have the freedom to choose which treatment they see fit for themselves. However, there are several circumstances where individuals can be hospitalized involuntarily. These circumstances are:

- If an individual poses a danger to self or others
- If an individual is unable to care for themself

Hospitalization may also be a treatment option if an individual:

- Does not have social support or people to supervise them
- Has a suicide plan
- Has symptoms of a psychiatric disorder (e.g., psychosis, mania, etc.)

=== Outpatient treatment ===
Outpatient treatment allows individuals to remain at their place of residence and receive treatment when needed or on a scheduled basis. Being at home may improve the quality of life for some patients because they will have access to their belongings and be able to come and go freely. Before allowing patients the freedom that comes with outpatient treatment, physicians evaluate several factors of the patient. These factors include the patient's level of social support, impulse control, and quality of judgment. After the patient passes the evaluation, they are often asked to consent to a "no-harm contract". This is a contract formulated by the physician and the family of the patient. Within the contract, the patient agrees not to harm themself, to continue their visits with the physician, and to contact the physician in times of need. There is some debate as to whether "no-harm" contracts are effective. These patients are then checked on routinely to assure they are maintaining their contract and avoiding dangerous activities (drinking alcohol, speeding, not wearing a seatbelt, etc.).

=== Medication ===
Prescribing medication to treat suicidal ideation can be difficult. One reason for this is that many medications lift patients' energy levels before lifting their moods. This puts them at greater risk of following through with attempting suicide. Additionally, if a person has a comorbid psychiatric disorder, it may be difficult to find a medication that addresses both the psychiatric disorder and suicidal ideation.

Antidepressants may be effective. Often, SSRIs are used instead of TCAs as the latter typically have greater harm in overdose.

Antidepressants have been shown to be a very effective means of treating suicidal ideation. One correlational study compared mortality rates due to suicide to the use of SSRI antidepressants in certain countries. The counties which had higher SSRI use had a significantly lower number of deaths caused by suicide. Additionally, an experimental study followed depressed patients for one year. During the first six months of that year, the patients were examined for suicidal behavior, including suicidal ideation. The patients were then prescribed antidepressants for the six months following the first six observatory months. During the six months of treatment, experimenters found suicidal ideation reduced from 47% of patients down to 14% of patients. Thus, it appears from current research that antidepressants have a helpful effect on the reduction of suicidal ideation.

Although research is largely in favor of the use of antidepressants for the treatment of suicidal ideation, in some cases antidepressants are claimed to be the cause of suicidal ideation. Upon the start of using antidepressants, many clinicians will note that sometimes the sudden onset of suicidal ideation may accompany treatment. This has caused the Food and Drug Administration (FDA) to issue a warning stating that sometimes the use of antidepressants may actually increase suicidal ideation. Medical studies have found antidepressants help treat cases of suicidal ideation and work especially well with psychological therapy. Lithium reduces the risk of suicide in people with mood disorders. Tentative evidence finds clozapine in people with schizophrenia reduces the risk of suicide.

== LGBTQ+ youth ==
Suicidal ideation rates among lesbian, gay, bisexual, transgender, and queer (LGBTQ+) youth are significantly higher than among the general population. Suicidal ideation, which has a higher prevalence among LGBTQ+ teenagers compared to their cisgender and heterosexual peers, has been attributed to minority stress, bullying, and parental disapproval.

Within the LGBTQ+ population, transgender youths face the highest rate of suicidal ideation. It is estimated that 82% of transgender people consider suicide with another estimated 40% actually attempting to kill themselves.

=== South Korea ===
South Korea has the 2nd highest rate of suicide in the world and the highest in the OECD. Within these rates, suicide is the primary cause of death for South Korean youth, ages 10–19. While these rates are elevated, suicidal ideation additionally increases with the introduction of LGBT identity.

== See also ==
- Existential angst
- Existential crisis
- Existential nihilism
- Finno-Ugrian suicide hypothesis
- Mental health first aid
- Suicide attempt
- Suicide crisis
- Suicide note
- Wellness check
