= Lethal arthrogryposis with anterior horn cell disease =

- Other names: Vuopala disease
- Lethal arthrogryposis with anterior horn cell disease is inherited in an autosomal recessive manner

Lethal arthrogryposis with anterior horn cell disease (LAAHD) is an autosomal recessive genetic disorder characterized by reduced mobility of the foetus and early death.

== Presentation ==
LAAHD resembles LCCS1 disease but the phenotype is milder, with survival beyond 32nd gestational week. However, the foetuses are often stillborn or survive only a few minutes. The movements of the foetus during pregnancy are scanty and stiff, often only in upper limbs. The malpositions are distal. The inwards spiral and especially the elbow contractures are less severe than in LCCS1 disease. Some patients have intrauterine long bone fractures. Skeletal muscles are affected and show neurogenic atrophy. The size and shape of spinal cord at different levels are normal but anterior horn motoneurons are diminished in number and degenerated.

== Molecular genetics ==
LAAHD disease results from compound heterozygosity of GLE1F in Major and a missense point mutation in exon 13 (6 cases in 3 families) or a missense mutation in exon 16 ( seven cases in 3 families). One of the latter cases survived 12 weeks, mostly under artificial respiration.

== Epidemiology ==
LAAHD is one of approximately 40 Finnish heritage diseases. Even though the variant has been detected in many populations, it is significantly more common in Finland than anywhere else, with a carrier frequency varying from 1:132 to 1:365 in rural and urban areas of Finland, respectively, compared to 1:680 in the Netherlands and 1:173 in Estonia.

Families affected by these diseases come from different parts of Finland, and birthplaces of the ancestors of affected individuals do not show geographic clustering.
