= Lethal congenital contracture syndrome =

Autosomal recessive genetic disorder

- Lethal congenital contracture syndrome has an autosomal recessive pattern of inheritance.
- Frequency: 0.0001%

Lethal congenital contracture syndrome 1 (LCCS1), also called multiple contracture syndrome, Finnish type, is an autosomal recessive genetic disorder characterized by total immobility of a fetus, detectable at around the 13th week of pregnancy. LCCS1 invariably leads to prenatal death before the 32nd gestational week. LCCS1 is one of 40 Finnish heritage diseases. It was first described in 1985 and since then, approximately 70 cases have been diagnosed.

== Signs and symptoms ==
LCCS1 is characterized by total lack of the movements of the fetus, and is detectable at 13th week of pregnancy. It is accompanied by oedema, small chin, small lungs, crooked joints and occasional skin webs of the neck and elbows. The fetus has characteristic pattern of malpositions recognizable even in severely macerated fetuses with club feet and hyperextension of the knees but the elbows and wrists showing flexion contractures.

Neuropathological analysis shows lack of anterior horn motoneurons and severe atrophy of the ventral spinal cord. The skeletal muscles are severely hypoplastic.

== Cause ==
The defective gene associated with LCCS1 is the mRNA export mediator GLE1 at chromosome 9q34. In more than 40 families the fetus has been homozygous for A->G substitution (c.432-10A>G) located in intron 3 of GLE1 creating an illegitimate splice acceptor site resulting in nine extra nucleotides in the GLE1 cDNA (GLE1 FinMajor mutation). In one family the fetus has been compound heterozygous for GLE1 FinMajor and R→H substitution in exon 12.

A slightly milder phenotype with survival beyond 32nd gestational week also characterized by foetal akinesia, arthrogryposis and anterior horn cell loss (Lethal arthrogryposis with anterior horn cell disease, LAAHD) was also shown to result from mutations in GLE1.

== Genetics ==
LCCS1 is inherited in an autosomal recessive manner. This means the defective gene responsible for the disorder (GLE1) is located on an autosome (chromosome 9), and two copies of the defective gene (one inherited from each parent) are required in order to be born with the disorder. The parents of an individual with an autosomal recessive disorder both carry one copy of the defective gene, but usually do not experience any signs or symptoms of the disorder.

=== Population genetics ===
LCCS1 belongs to Finnish heritage of diseases and cases have been confirmed until now (2009) only in Finland. The prevalence is 1 in 25000 births. The carrier frequency is 1% in whole Finland and 2% in North-Eastern part of Finland where the birthplaces of ancestors of affected individual show clustering.

=== Mapping ===
Mäkelä-Bengs et al. (1997,1998) performed a genome-wide screening and linkage analysis and assigned the LCCS locus to a defined region of 9q34.

== See also ==
- Lethal arthrogryposis with anterior horn cell disease
