= Nucleoporin 155 =

Protein-coding gene in the species Homo sapiens

NUP155

Identifiers
- Aliases: NUP155, ATFB15, N155, nucleoporin 155kDa, nucleoporin 155
- External IDs: OMIM: 606694; MGI: 2181182; GeneCards: NUP155
Available structures
PDB	Ortholog search: PDBe RCSB
PDB	List of PDB id codes 5A9Q, 5IJN, 5IJO

Gene location (Human)
Chr.	Chromosome 5 (human)
Band	5p13.2	Start	37,288,137 bp
Band	5p13.2	End	37,371,106 bp

Gene location (Mouse)
Chr.	Chromosome 15 (mouse)
Band	15|15 A1	Start	8,138,757 bp
Band	15|15 A1	End	8,190,731 bp
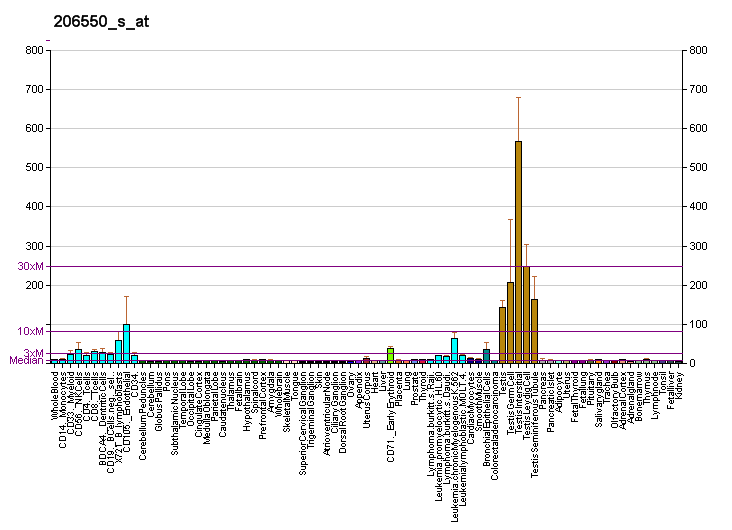
RNA expression pattern
Bgee	Human / Mouse (ortholog); Top expressed in: sperm; left testis; right testis; secondary oocyte; gonad; testicle; ventricular zone; Achilles tendon; embryo; ganglionic eminence / Top expressed in: tail of embryo; epiblast; spermatocyte; genital tubercle; internal carotid artery; external carotid artery; maxillary prominence; mandibular prominence; pineal gland; cumulus cell; More reference expression data
BioGPS	More reference expression data
Gene ontology
Molecular function	transporter activity; protein binding; structural constituent of nuclear pore
Cellular component	nuclear membrane; membrane; nuclear envelope; nuclear pore; nucleus; nuclear pore inner ring; host cell
Biological process	mRNA transport; nuclear envelope organization; viral transcription; protein sumoylation; mitotic nuclear membrane disassembly; nucleocytoplasmic transport; atrial cardiac muscle cell action potential; regulation of cellular response to heat; protein transport; viral process; intracellular transport of virus; protein import into nucleus; RNA export from nucleus; tRNA export from nucleus; transcription-dependent tethering of RNA polymerase II gene DNA at nuclear periphery; protein localization to nuclear inner membrane; mRNA export from nucleus; regulation of gene silencing by miRNA; regulation of glycolytic process; transport
Sources:Amigo / QuickGO
Orthologs
Databases	NCBI: entry; OMA: entry
Species	Human	Mouse
Entrez	9631	170762
Ensembl	ENSG00000113569	ENSMUSG00000022142
UniProt	O75694	Q99P88
RefSeq (mRNA)	NM_001278312; NM_004298; NM_153485	NM_133227
RefSeq (protein)	NP_001265241; NP_004289; NP_705618	NP_573490
Location (UCSC)	Chr 5: 37.29 – 37.37 Mb	Chr 15: 8.14 – 8.19 Mb
PubMed search
- Wikidata
View/Edit Human	View/Edit Mouse

Nucleoporin 155 (Nup155) is a protein that in humans is encoded by the NUP155 gene.

Nucleoporins are the main components of the nuclear pore complex (NPC) of eukaryotic cells. They are involved in the bidirectional trafficking of molecules, especially mRNAs and proteins, between the nucleus and the cytoplasm. The protein encoded by this gene does not contain the typical FG repeat sequences found in most vertebrate nucleoporins. Two protein isoforms are encoded by transcript variants of this gene.

== Interactions ==
NUP155 has been shown to interact with GLE1L.
