= Finno-Ugrian suicide hypothesis =

Disputed genetic theory

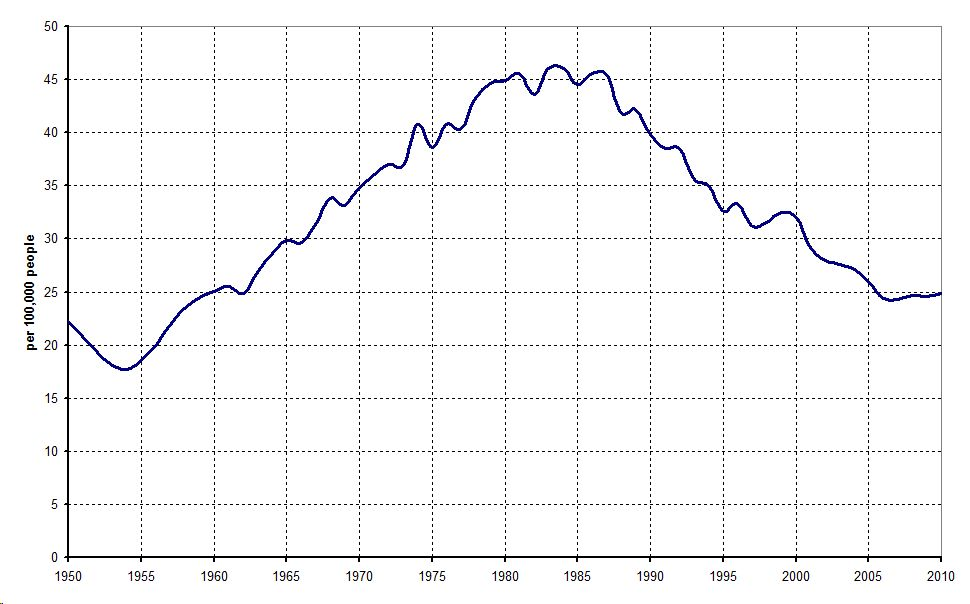
Suicide rate in Hungary (1950–2005), 1983: 45.3 suicides per 100,000 people, it was the second highest rate (after Lithuania, 1995: 45.6) of an independent state in recorded human history. Higher rates were only measured in regions like Greenland or the Canadian territories.

The Finno-Ugrian suicide hypothesis proposes to link genetic ties originating among Finno-Ugric peoples to high rate of suicide, claiming an allele common among them is responsible.

Mari and Udmurts have been found to have a three times higher suicide rate than Finns and Hungarians. It has been thus theorized that such a possible allele may have arisen in those populations.

However, contrary to the hypothesis, available contemporary (1990–1994) suicide rates in the United States were uniformly negatively associated with the proportion of the population comprising people of self-reported Hungarian, Lithuanian, Polish, Russian, Slovak and Ukrainian descent. The findings of this first test outside Europe are therefore conflicting. A proposal based on the geographical study approach is offered to further the progress of investigations into the genetics of suicide.

== See also ==
- Human genetic variation
- Finnish heritage disease
- Gloomy Sunday
- List of countries by suicide rate
