= GLE1L =

Protein-coding gene in the species Homo sapiens

GLE1

Identifiers
- Aliases: GLE1, GLE1L, LCCS, LCCS1, hRNA export mediator, GLE1 RNA export mediator, CAAHC, CAAHD
- External IDs: OMIM: 603371; MGI: 1921662; GeneCards: GLE1

Gene location (Human)
Chr.	Chromosome 9 (human)
Band	9q34.11	Start	128,504,655 bp
Band	9q34.11	End	128,543,874 bp

Gene location (Mouse)
Chr.	Chromosome 2 (mouse)
Band	2|2 B	Start	29,825,438 bp
Band	2|2 B	End	29,850,383 bp
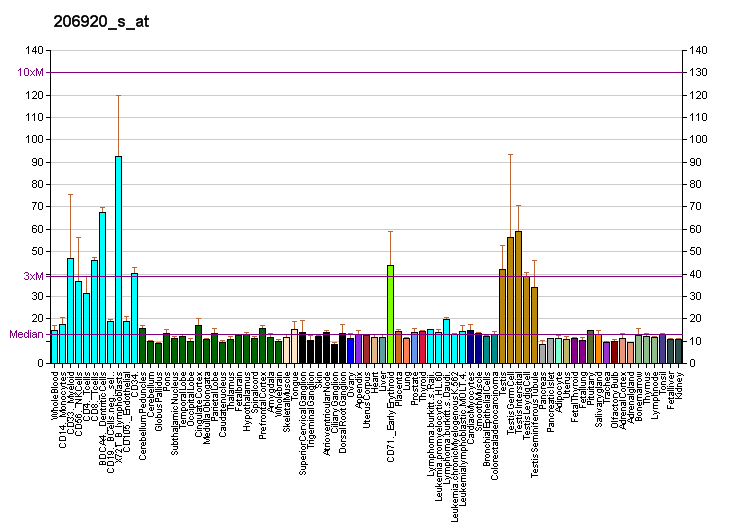

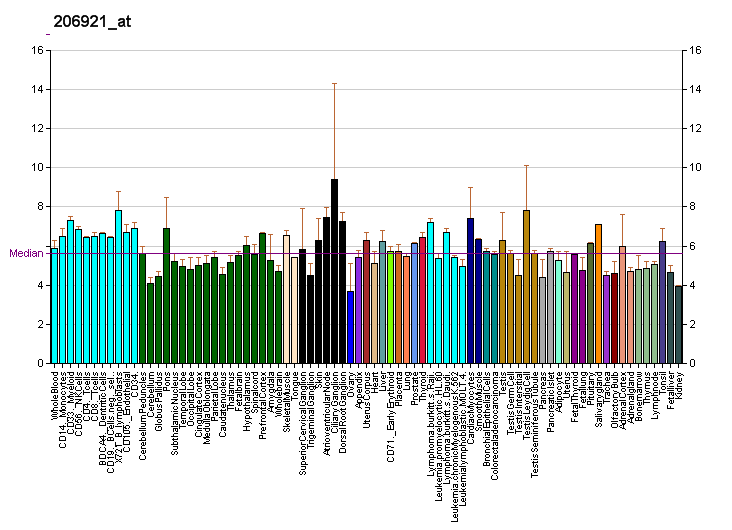
RNA expression pattern
Bgee	Human / Mouse (ortholog); Top expressed in: buccal mucosa cell; tendon of biceps brachii; right testis; left testis; granulocyte; gastrocnemius muscle; sperm; monocyte; ventricular zone; islet of Langerhans / Top expressed in: secondary oocyte; primary oocyte; zygote; yolk sac; Rostral migratory stream; ureter; ascending aorta; renal corpuscle; neural layer of retina; aortic valve; More reference expression data
BioGPS	More reference expression data
Gene ontology
Molecular function	identical protein binding; protein binding; inositol hexakisphosphate binding; phospholipid binding; translation initiation factor binding
Cellular component	membrane; nucleus; nuclear pore cytoplasmic filaments; nuclear pore; extracellular space; nucleolus; cytoplasm; cytosol; nuclear membrane
Biological process	protein transport; poly(A)+ mRNA export from nucleus; mRNA transport; mRNA export from nucleus; regulation of translational termination; regulation of translational initiation; transport
Sources:Amigo / QuickGO
Orthologs
Databases	NCBI: entry; OMA: entry
Species	Human	Mouse
Entrez	2733	74412
Ensembl	ENSG00000119392	ENSMUSG00000019715
UniProt	Q53GS7	Q8R322
RefSeq (mRNA)	NM_001003722; NM_001499	NM_028923
RefSeq (protein)	NP_001003722; NP_001490	NP_083199
Location (UCSC)	Chr 9: 128.5 – 128.54 Mb	Chr 2: 29.83 – 29.85 Mb
PubMed search
- Wikidata
View/Edit Human	View/Edit Mouse

mRNA export factor GLE1 is a protein that in humans is encoded by the GLE1 gene on chromosome 9 (previously denoted GLE1L).

== Function ==
This gene encodes a predicted 75-kDa polypeptide with high sequence and structure homology to yeast Gle1p, which is nuclear protein with a leucine-rich nuclear export sequence essential for poly(A)+RNA export. Inhibition of human GLE1L by microinjection of antibodies against GLE1L in HeLa cells resulted in inhibition of poly(A)+RNA export. Immunofluorescence studies show that GLE1L is localized at the nuclear pore complexes. This localization suggests that GLE1L may act at a terminal step in the export of mature RNA messages to the cytoplasm. Two alternatively spliced transcript variants encoding different isoforms have been found for this gene.

== Clinical significance ==
A genome-wide screening and linkage analysis assigned the disease locus of lethal congenital contracture syndrome, one of 40 Finnish heritage diseases, to a defined region of 9q34, where the GLE1 gene is located. Mutations in GLEI have been identified in families with foetal motoneuron disease.

== Interactions ==
GLE1L has been shown to interact with NUP155.
