= Igor Galynker =

American psychiatrist

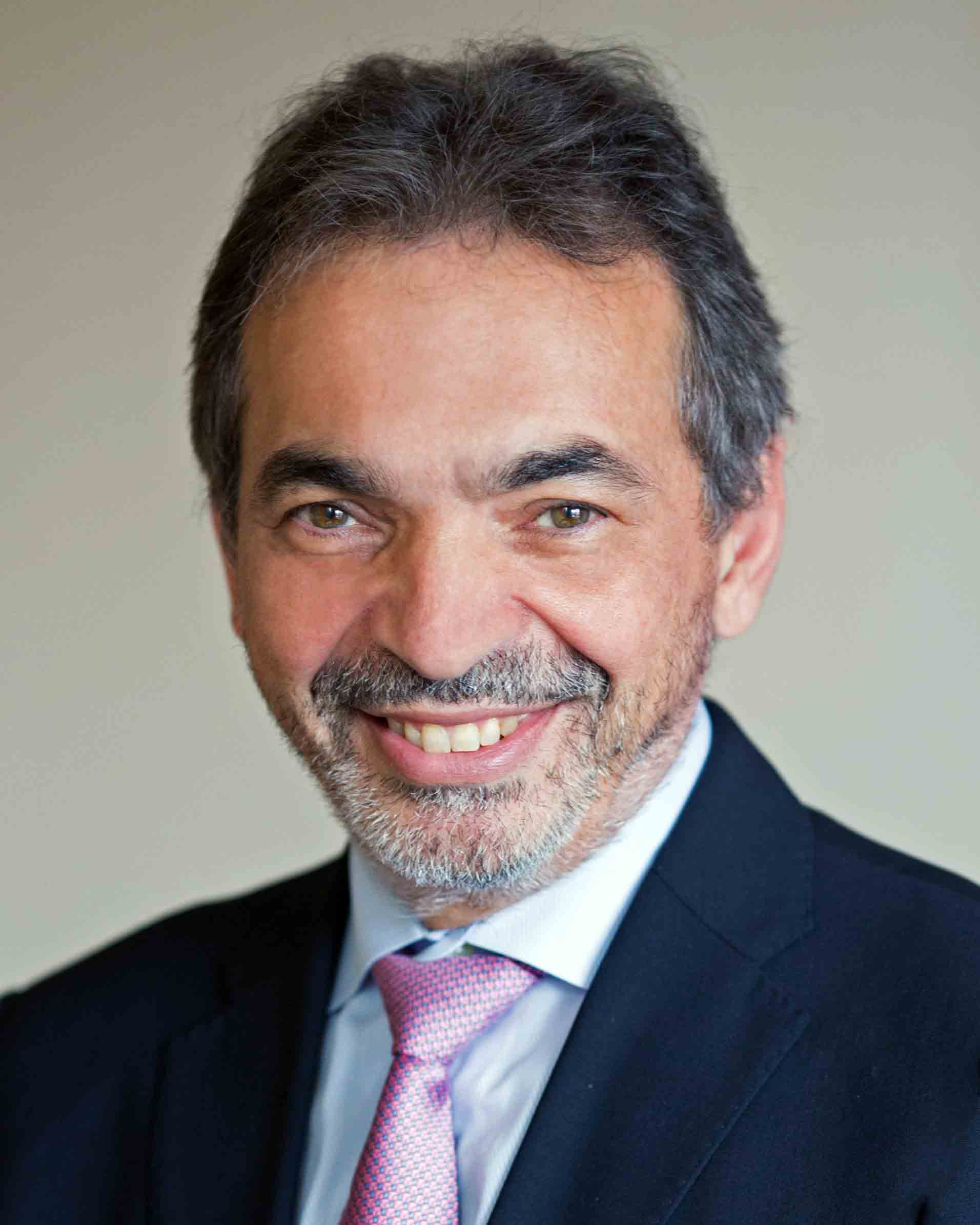
- Igor Galynker
- Born: Moscow, USSR
- Occupation: Psychiatrist
- Years active: 1988 - present

Igor Galynker is an American psychiatrist, clinician and researcher. His research interests include bipolar disorder, suicide prevention, and the role of family dynamics in psychiatric illness. He has published on these topics both in professional journals and in the lay press. His recent research has been devoted to describing Suicide Crisis Syndrome (SCS), an acute suicidal cognitive-affective state predictive of imminent suicidal behavior.

Galynker currently serves as the Associate Chairman for Research in the Department of Psychiatry at Mount Sinai Beth Israel, and is the Founder and Director of the Family Center for Bipolar Disorder and of the Mount Sinai Suicide Research and Prevention Laboratory. Since 2014, he has held the position of Professor of Psychiatry at the Icahn School of Medicine in New York City.

== Education and work in chemistry ==
Galynker was born in Moscow, USSR. His mother, Raya, was an internist and his father, Ilya, was a professor of textile engineering. They met and married in Voronezh before World War II and moved to Moscow after the war ended. In 1971 Galynker graduated as from Moscow's Public School #109, and in 1976 he earned magna cum laude from the Department of Chemistry at Moscow State University.

He immigrated to the United States in 1978, and worked as a chemist researcher at the CIBA-Geigy corporation for a year. Then he pursued graduate studies (1978–1981) in organic synthesis under the mentorship of professor W. Clark Still at Columbia University. His PhD thesis, recognized with the Hammet Award for outstanding research, described the first use of computer modeling in organic synthesis and has subsequently been widely cited. Following a fellowship in human genetics at the Columbia Presbyterian Medical Center, Galynker taught chemistry at Purdue University and at Columbia University.

== Work in psychiatry and Mount Sinai Beth Israel ==
Galynker received his medical degree in 1988 from the Albert Einstein College of Medicine. He completed his psychiatry residency at Mount Sinai Medical Center. He has since worked at Beth Israel Medical Center in Manhattan (currently Mount Sinai Beth Israel), where he is the Associate Chairman for Research in the Department of Psychiatry and Behavioral Sciences.

=== Galynker Family Center for Bipolar Disorder ===
In 2006, Galynker founded the Family Center for Bipolar Disorder (FCB), a clinical and research center providing mental health care for children, adolescents, and adults. The center was profiled in the New York Times and the Wall Street Journal. In 2015, the Family Center for Bipolar was officially renamed the Richard and Cynthia Zirinsky Center for Bipolar, in honor of a gift from the Zirinsky Family. In 2021, the center was renamed the Galynker Family Center for Bipolar Disorder.

== Other research ==
=== Cognition ===
While working as a resident psychiatrist, Galynker was the first to report that both hospital admissions from the ER and the duration of hospital stay in the acute psychiatric unit was influenced by cognition, suggesting that in addition to psychiatric symptoms, cognitive dysfunction should be a target of pharmacological intervention. This work anticipated later focus on treatment of cognitive dysfunction and cognitive training in schizophrenia and bipolar disorder Galynker later reported on persistent cognitive deficits in opiate addicts in methadone maintenance treatment

=== Addictions ===
While in residency working at the Brookhaven National Laboratory, Galynker synthesized [11-C]-buprenorphine for use in PET studies of opiate addiction. He later published PET studies of remitted opiate addicts which showed that cognitive deficits, negative affect, and abnormal glucose metabolism present during active drug use persisted for months and years after detoxification from methadone. With Lisa Cohen, Galynker later showed that behavioral sex addicts, such as male pedophiles, had deficits in glucose metabolism in the temporal cortex and severe character pathology that was similar but broader and more pronounced than that of the opiate-dependent subjects. In a subsequent series of reports, Cohen and Galynker described character pathology of pedophiles and other sex offenders and proposed a model for the etiology of pedophilic behavior.

=== Mood disorders ===
In 1998 Galynker published a widely cited SPECT study of cerebral perfusion in Major Depressive Disorder (MDD), which showed that in MDD, reduced cerebral blood flow was associated with negative symptoms rather than mood. This was one of the first imaging studies to demonstrate that cerebral function was not related to a specific diagnosis but to symptoms, a finding which echoed Galynker's early findings on cognitive deficits and patient function, and anticipated the current NIMH Research Domain Criteria Project. Galynker was also the first to report (in a case series) that low dose quetiapine and risperidone were effective for treatment of depression and anxiety a finding later supported by randomized clinical trials, leading to quetiapine approval for these indications. Galynker has also contributed to research investigating racial disparities in diagnostic rates of bipolar disorder, finding that Black individuals are more likely than white patients to be diagnosed with schizophrenia rather than bipolar disorder.

=== Suicide Prevention ===
Since 2008, Galynker and his colleagues have been working on describing an acute suicidal mental state that precedes a suicide attempt. Their work has led to the formulation of the Narrative Crisis Model of Suicide.

==== Narrative Crisis Model of Suicide ====
The Narrative Crisis Model of Suicide (NCM) is a comprehensive theoretical framework aimed at illustrating the complex dynamic contributing to suicidal behavior. This model posits that individuals with an elevated baseline vulnerability to suicide may develop a Suicidal Narrative, a distorted perceptions of themselves, others and the world, when facing stressful life events. The Suicidal Narrative consist of eight stages, such as difficulties disengaging from unrealistic goals, difficulties redirecting one's efforts toward realistic goals, feelings of entitlement to happiness, social defeat, fear of humiliation, thwarted belongingness, perceived burdensomeness, and a perception of no future. Anchored in long-term inter and intra-personal vulnerabilities these distorted cognitions may result in individuals perceiving them as having no future, where suicide is the only viable option. The final stage of the NCM is the Suicide Crisis Syndrome.

==== Suicide Crisis Syndrome ====
In 2010, with Zimri Yaseen, Galynker introduced the concept of the Suicide Crisis Syndrome (SCS), initially known as Suicide Trigger State, a suicide-specific clinical entity, characterized by frantic hopelessness/entrapment, affective disturbance, loss of cognitive control, hyperarousal, and acute social withdrawal. SCS was found to be strongly predictive of suicidal behavior within one-two months after discharge. Importantly, the staple of current suicide risk assessment, suicidal ideation and intent may or may not be present. The SCS diagnosis is currently under review by the DSM Steering Committee for inclusion in the Diagnostic and Statistical Manual of Mental Disorders.

In addition to the SCI, Galynker and colleagues have developed a multi-informant Modular Assessment of Risk for Imminent Suicide (MARIS). MARIS has four independent assessment modules and is unique in that both patients and clinicians provide information. Clinicians' modules include their emotional responses to the SCS, which significantly improve predictive scale. Both the SCS and the MARIS projects were funded by the American Foundation for Suicide Prevention.

The SCS, the MARIS, and their clinical use are described in Galynker's recent textbook, "The Suicidal Crisis. Clinical Guide to the Assessment of Imminent Suicide Risk."

In 2020, Northshore Healthcare System in Chicago implemented Galynker's Suicide Crisis patient assessment measure (SCI-SF) and found it to be a preferred tool for guiding a clinical decision-making regarding the hospitalization of patients at risk of suicide.

== Advocacy and public awareness ==
Galynker has been outspoken in his concerns about possible conflicts of interest between psychiatrists and the pharmaceutical industry. In 2005, he showed that the results of pharmaceutical trials published in even the most reputable scientific journals, JAMA Psychiatry and the American Journal of Psychiatry, systematically favored the drug produced by the manufacturer that paid for the study and disfavored the competitor.

Galynker has also been concerned with the harmful consequences of family exclusion from psychiatric treatment, which he associated with an increased risk of violence and suicide as well as poor outcomes His opinions on the role of family (and staff) in preventing campus violence and reducing student suicide risks have been published by ABC News, the New York Times, and The Wall Street Journal. Galynker has written a book, Talking to Families About Mental Illness, on how to involve family in psychiatric treatment, as well as an advice book on how to recognize the right romantic partner, "Choosing Right: A Psychiatrist's Guide to Starting a New Relationship" (ASIN B00C6D7BRE).

== Books ==
- The Suicidal Crisis: Clinical Guide to the Assessment of Imminent Suicide Risk, 2nd edition
- Talking to Families about Mental Illness: What Clinicians Need to Know
- Choosing Right: A Psychiatrist's Guide To Starting A New Relationship
- WE
