= Samaritans of Singapore =

Suicide prevention centre

- Abbreviation: SOS
- Formation: 1 Dec 1969
- Type: Non-profit organisation
- Registration no.: 202245684D
- Purpose: To be an available lifeline to anyone in crisis.
- Region served: Singapore
- Website: sos.org.sg

Samaritans of Singapore (SOS) is a non denominational, non-profit suicide prevention centre. Since its establishment in 1969, SOS has developed into a professionally run and managed organisation. It adopts a holistic approach to suicide, focussing on suicide prevention, intervention and postvention.

SOS is a member of the National Council of Social Service and is supported by the Community Chest. SOS is also affiliated to American Association of Suicidology (AAS), International Association for Suicide Prevention, Befrienders Worldwide, and International Federation of Telephonic Emergency Services (IFOTES).

== Purpose ==
With the mission to be an available lifeline to anyone in crisis, SOS offers emotional support to people in crisis, thinking of suicide or affected by suicide. All information shared with SOS is treated as confidential and people can choose to remain anonymous.

== Services ==
SOS provides the following services and programmes:

- Email Befriending
- 24-hour hotline
- Professional Counselling
- Local Outreach to Suicide Survivors (LOSS)
- Healing Bridge, a suicide bereavement support group
- Crisis Support
- Case Consultation
- Training
- Community Outreach
- SOS Care Text

== See also ==
- List of voluntary welfare organisations in Singapore
- Edwin S. Shneidman
