= Samaritans (charity) =

British and Irish mental health charity

- Samaritans logo as of 2019
- Formation: 1953
- Headquarters: Ewell, England
- Region served: Great Britain; Ireland
- Founder: Chad Varah
- Website: samaritans.org

Samaritans is a registered charity aimed at providing emotional support to anyone in emotional distress, struggling to cope or at risk of suicide throughout the United Kingdom and Ireland, often through its telephone helpline. Its name derives from the biblical parable of the Good Samaritan, although the organisation itself is not religious.

Its international network exists under the name Befrienders Worldwide, which is part of the Volunteer Emotional Support Helplines (VESH) with Lifeline International and the International Federation of Telephone Emergency Services (IFOTES).

== History ==
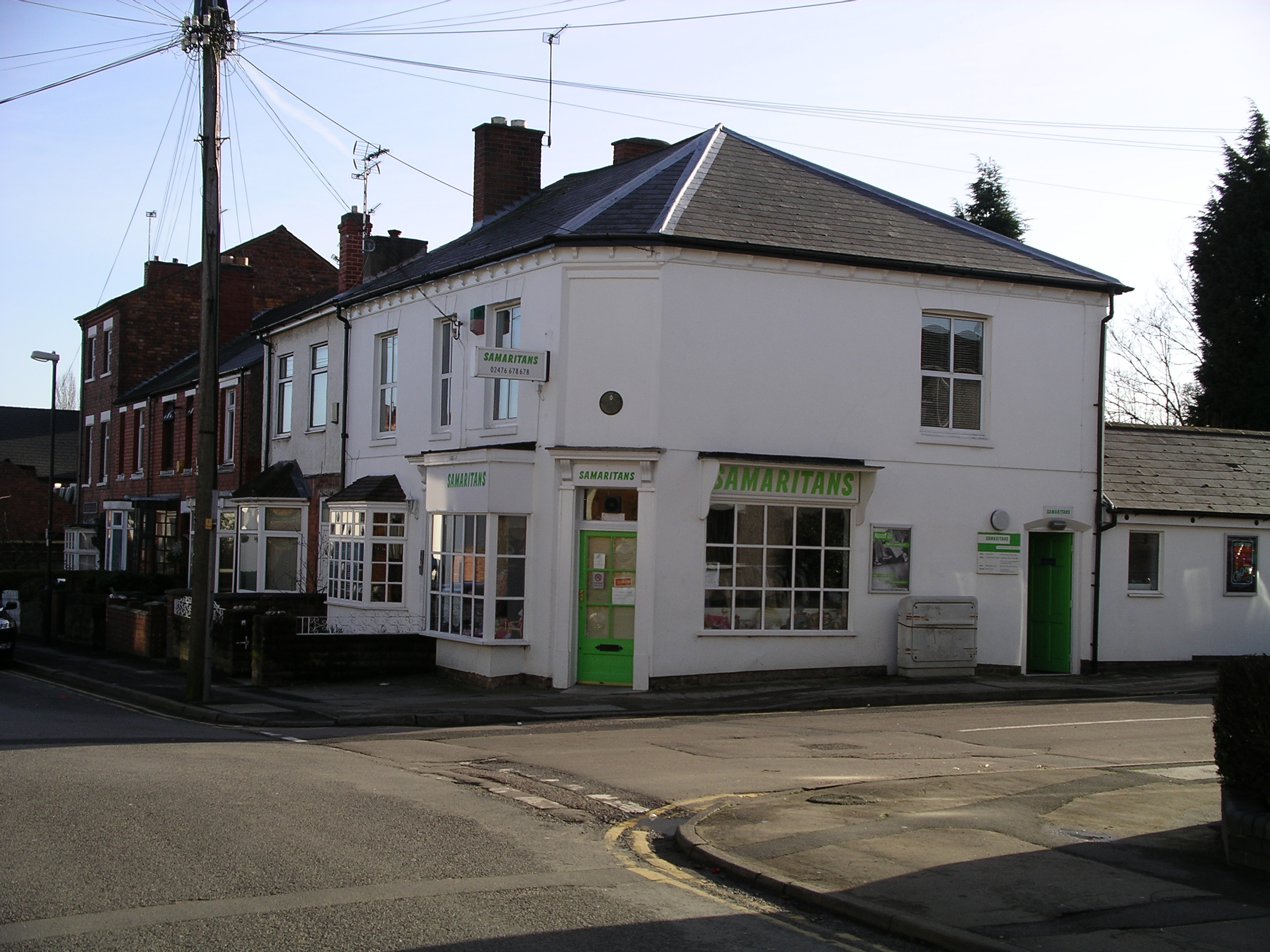
The Coventry branch of Samaritans

Samaritans was founded in 1953 by the Rev. Chad Varah, a Church of England vicar in the Diocese of London. His inspiration came from an experience he had had some years earlier as a young curate in the Diocese of Lincoln. He had taken a funeral for a fourteen-year-old girl who had died by suicide because she believed she had contracted an STI, when in reality she was menstruating. Varah placed an advertisement in a newspaper encouraging people to volunteer at his church, listening to people contemplating suicide.

The movement grew rapidly: within ten years there were 40 branches and now there are 201 branches across Great Britain and Ireland, deliberately organised without regard to national boundaries on the basis that a service which is not political or religious should not recognise political or sectarian divisions. Samaritans offers support through over 21,200 trained volunteers (2015) and is entirely dependent on voluntary support. The name was not originally chosen by Chad Varah: it was part of a headline to an article in the Daily Mirror newspaper on 7 December 1953 about Varah's work.

In 1972, BBC1 ran an 11-episode television series called The Befrienders, featuring fictional stories about people in desperate situations who reach out to the Samaritans. Although it was cancelled after one season, the series helped to raise public awareness about their work, leading to a significant increase in inbound calls, as well as a surge in the number of volunteers in the UK.

In 2004, Chad Varah announced that he had become disillusioned with Samaritans. He said, "It's no longer what I founded. I founded an organisation to offer help to suicidal or equally desperate people. The last elected chairman re-branded the organisation. It was no longer to be an emergency service, it was to be emotional support". One in five calls to Samaritans is from someone with suicidal feelings. Samaritans' vision is that fewer people will die by suicide. In 2005, a rapprochement was reached when Varah met with the new chief executive, and then chairman, of The Samaritans and enjoyed hearing about the continued essential and enlightened work Varah had begun in 1953. In 2006, Varah's eldest son, Michael Varah, was appointed to sit on the newly created board of trustees.

== Services ==
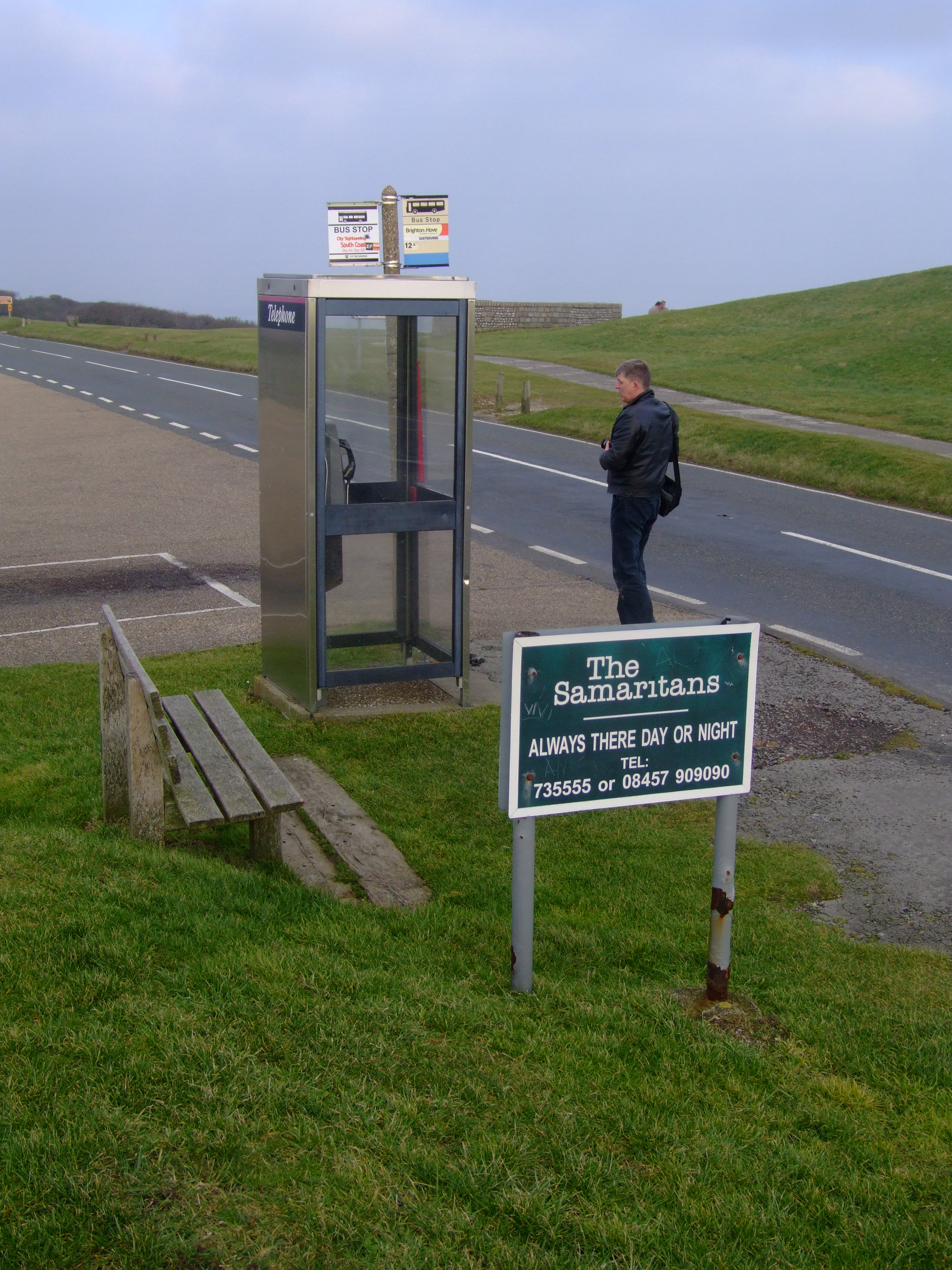
Sign promoting Samaritans near a payphone at Beachy Head

The core of Samaritans' work is a telephone helpline, operating 24 hours a day, 365 days a year. Samaritans was the first 24-hour telephone helpline to be set up in the UK.

Since 1994, Samaritans has also offered confidential email support. Initially operating from one branch, the service is now provided by 198 branches and co-ordinated from the organisation's head office. In 2011, Samaritans received over 206,000 emails, including many from outside the UK, and aims to answer each one within 24 hours.

In 2014, Samaritans received 5,100,000 calls for help by phone, email, text, letter, minicom, face-to-face at a branch, through its work in prisons, and at local and national festivals and other events.

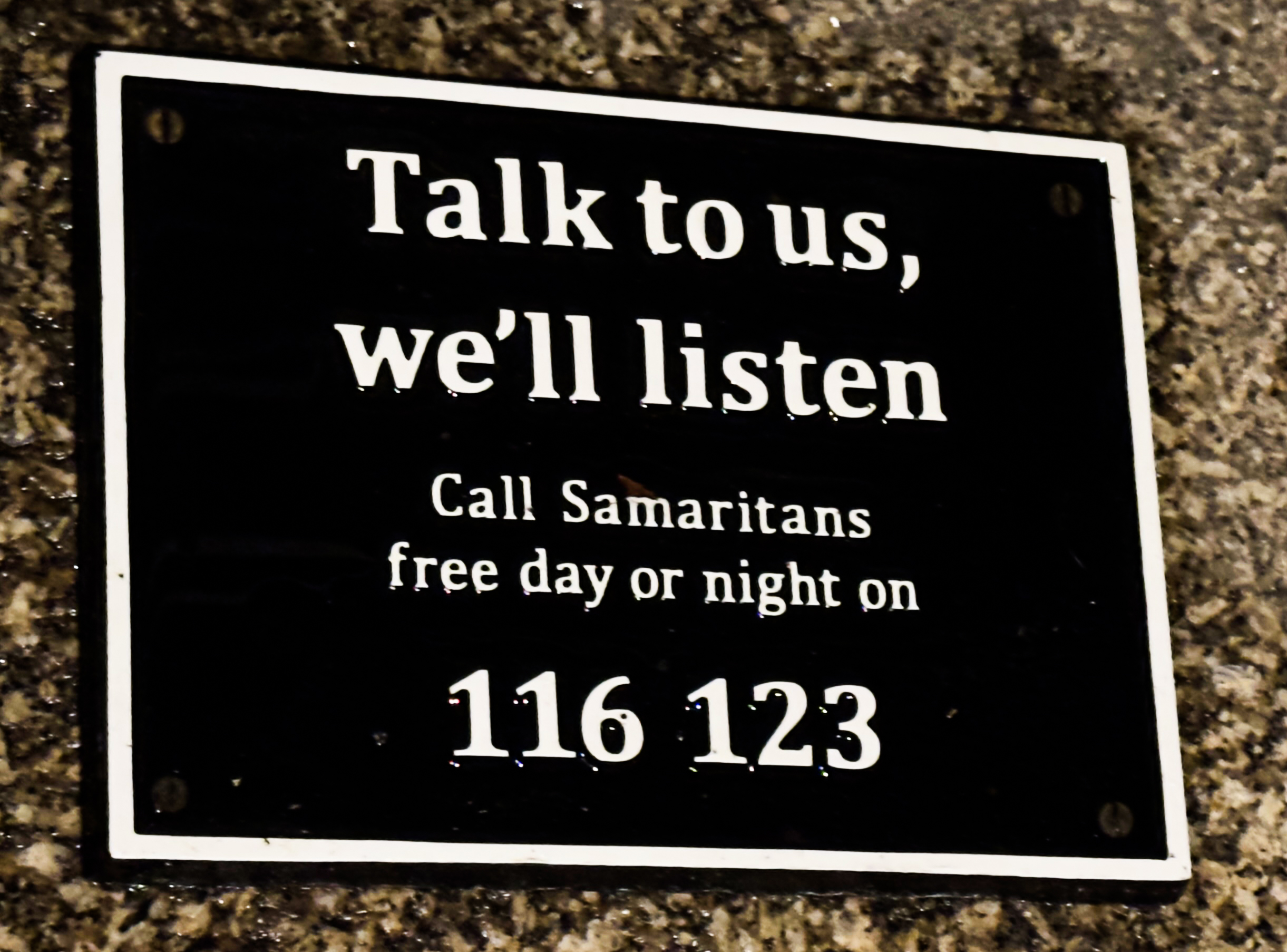
Plaque promoting Samaritans at Rochester Bridge in Kent, England

Samaritans does not denounce suicide, and it is not necessary to be suicidal to contact Samaritans. In 2014, nearly 80% of the people calling Samaritans did not express suicidal feelings. In 2022, Samaritans campaigned to have "suicide websites" shut down; stating that it believed that the UK government's proposed online safety bill "isn't fit for purpose". Smaller "pro-suicide" websites which can push people to commit suicide are the charity's biggest concern in this area.

== Confidentiality ==
Samaritans have a strict code of caller confidentiality, even after the death of a caller. Unless the caller gives consent to pass on information, confidentiality will be broken only in rare circumstances, such as when Samaritans receives bomb or terrorism warnings, to call an ambulance because a caller appears to be incapable of making rational decisions, when the caller is threatening volunteers or deliberately preventing the service being delivered to other callers, or when there is a safeguarding concern.

In 2011, Facebook collaborated with Samaritans to offer help to people in distress. This led to 'cold case' calling, which some believed was an infringement on people's privacy. An Irish journalist wrote of her experience of receiving such a communication.

== See also ==
- Mental health in the United Kingdom
- The Samaritans Hong Kong
- The Samaritan Befrienders Hong Kong
- Samaritans of Singapore
