= Suicide in Hong Kong =

In 2017, the suicide rate in Hong Kong was around 12 deaths per 100,000 people and ranked 32 in the world standing, which was its lowest rate in four years. The suicide rate for males was nearly double that for females, as it was 16.2 deaths per 100,000 males, and 8.8 deaths per 100,000 females. Although it has decreased slightly compared to previous years, for those aged 19 or younger it has risen by 50%. The Samaritans Hong Kong charity has described the issues as worthy of attention.

Factors in suicide include the Hong Kong education system and pressure from families. The Hok Yau Club (a Hong Kong public charity and a member of the Hong Kong Council of Social Service) mainly serves young students and provides counselling services. It also organises various extracurricular activities. Deputy director-general Wu Baocheng believes that current social values are the main source of student pressure: "This competition starts from kindergartens, the first things students learn in school was to score full marks in all tasks, instead of building up their own personality." He also mentioned that the reasons for success in the Hong Kong education system was due to the competitive learning environment.

Flag of Hong Kong

The suicide rate among students is relatively high. According to research from City University, almost one-third of teenagers (age 10–14) in Hong Kong have been identified as potentially suicidal.

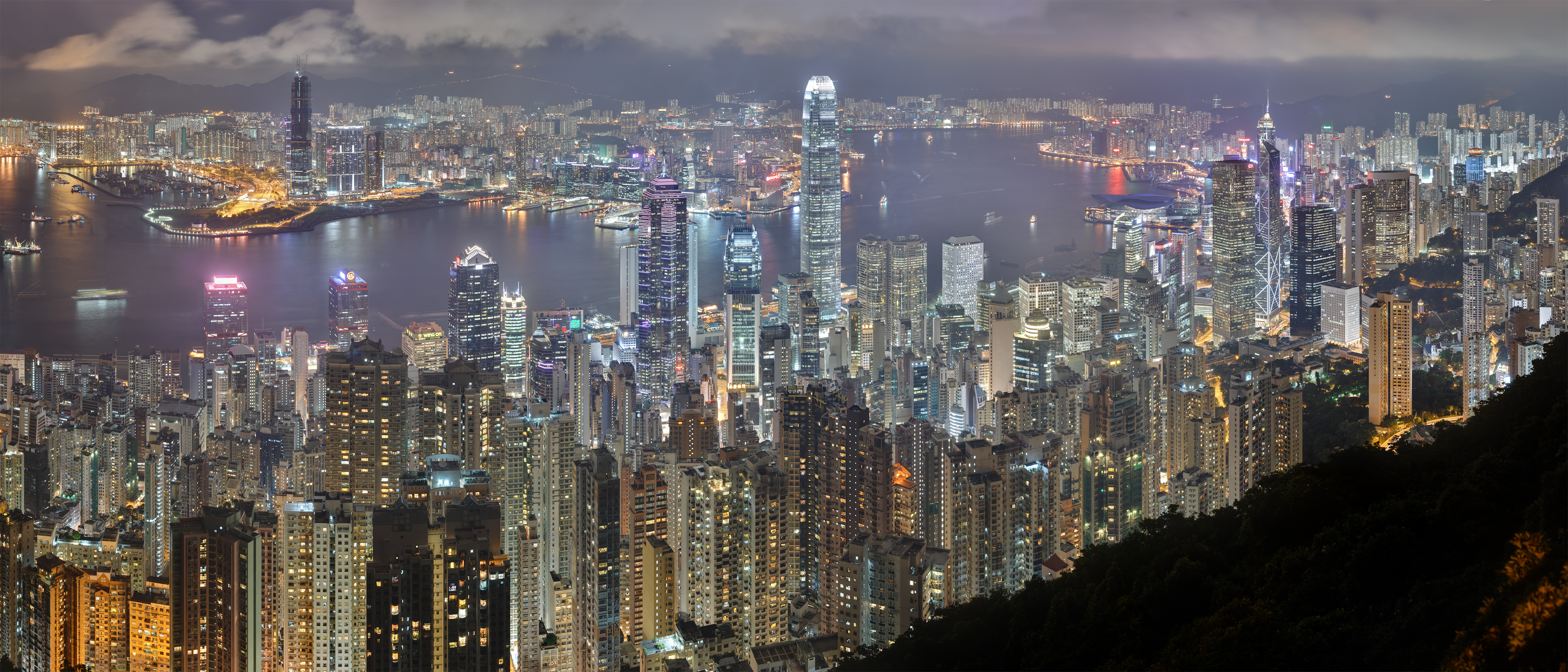
Hong Kong

== Statistics ==
=== Age ===
The percentages for suicide rate by age group in Hong Kong remained similar from 2012 to 2016, as they were to suicide rates by age group in the world. Teenage suicide has been an increasing situation, from 52 people committing suicide in 2014, to 75 people in 2015. There have been 6 cases in which suicide notes indicate the death to be academically related. The remaining causes of death include emotional problems, family problems, an unsatisfactory life (peer pressure and disputes with relatives and friends, etc.), health problems. At a rough estimate, every 9.3 days a teenager in Hong Kong (under the age of 24) will end their life.

Number of Suicides by Age Group in Hong Kong (2012–2016)
Age	2012	2013	2014	2015	2016
Less than 15	3	3	6	2	7
15–24	73	66	52	68	75
25–34	137	143	110	109	126
35–44	156	142	161	158	126
45–54	163	172	169	155	143
55–64	132	171	149	169	154
65 and above	251	241	266	263	283

=== Gender ===
Since 2000, men have a suicide rate that is roughly twice as high as women. According to a study, this is due to men feeling more responsibility and pressure in Hong Kong’s society than females (in the working culture of Hong Kong). Some studies and research show that females treat suicide as a protest or declaration of sovereignty, while males commit suicide with a firm will.

Number of Suicides by Gender in Hong Kong (2000–2016)
Gender	2000	2001	2002	2003	2004	2005	2006	2007	2008	2009	2010	2011	2012	2013	2014	2015	2016
Male	546	647	741	831	665	614	576	587	577	616	605	535	566	584	567	588	595
Female	356	382	369	433	388	382	359	322	400	367	364	332	351	355	347	336	324
Overall	902	1029	1110	1264	1053	996	935	909	977	983	969	867	917	939	914	924	919

Compared to the world’s suicide rate by gender, these percentages are similar to other countries, especially when compared with other Asian countries.

=== Method ===
There are four common suicide method in Hong Kong; jumping, poisoning, hanging, and charcoal burning, for which most of the materials required are easily accessible. The percentages for method of suicide are similar for the years 2000 to 2016, and jumping from a height accounts for 50% of suicides. As Hong Kong's buildings are typically built with multiple floors, jumping is a relatively 'easy' method.

Suicide methods in Hong Kong (2000–2016)
Method	2000	2001	2002	2003	2004	2005	2006	2007	2008	2009	2010	2011	2012	2013	2014	2015	2016
Others	5.9	5.6	5	4.9	4.4	4.2	5.3	4.4	5.2	8.4	5.4	5.5	7.2	5.1	7.9	5.2	7.5
Poisoning	5.4	3.7	3.9	4	2.9	3	3.2	3.4	4.2	1	3.1	3.3	4.4	2.7	2.7	4.1	3.5
Charcoal Burning	19.5	24.9	25.1	25.4	21.7	21.4	17.6	15.7	17.1	18.2	14.1	14.5	13.2	15.4	14.7	14	11.8
Hanging	25.7	21.4	23.1	19.5	20.9	21.6	21.7	22.7	21.4	20.7	21.9	22.4	24.6	25.6	23.2	23.7	22.4
Jumping	43.5	44.5	43	46.2	50.1	49.8	52.1	53.8	52.1	51.7	55.5	54.2	50.6	51.2	51.5	53	54.8

== Student suicides ==
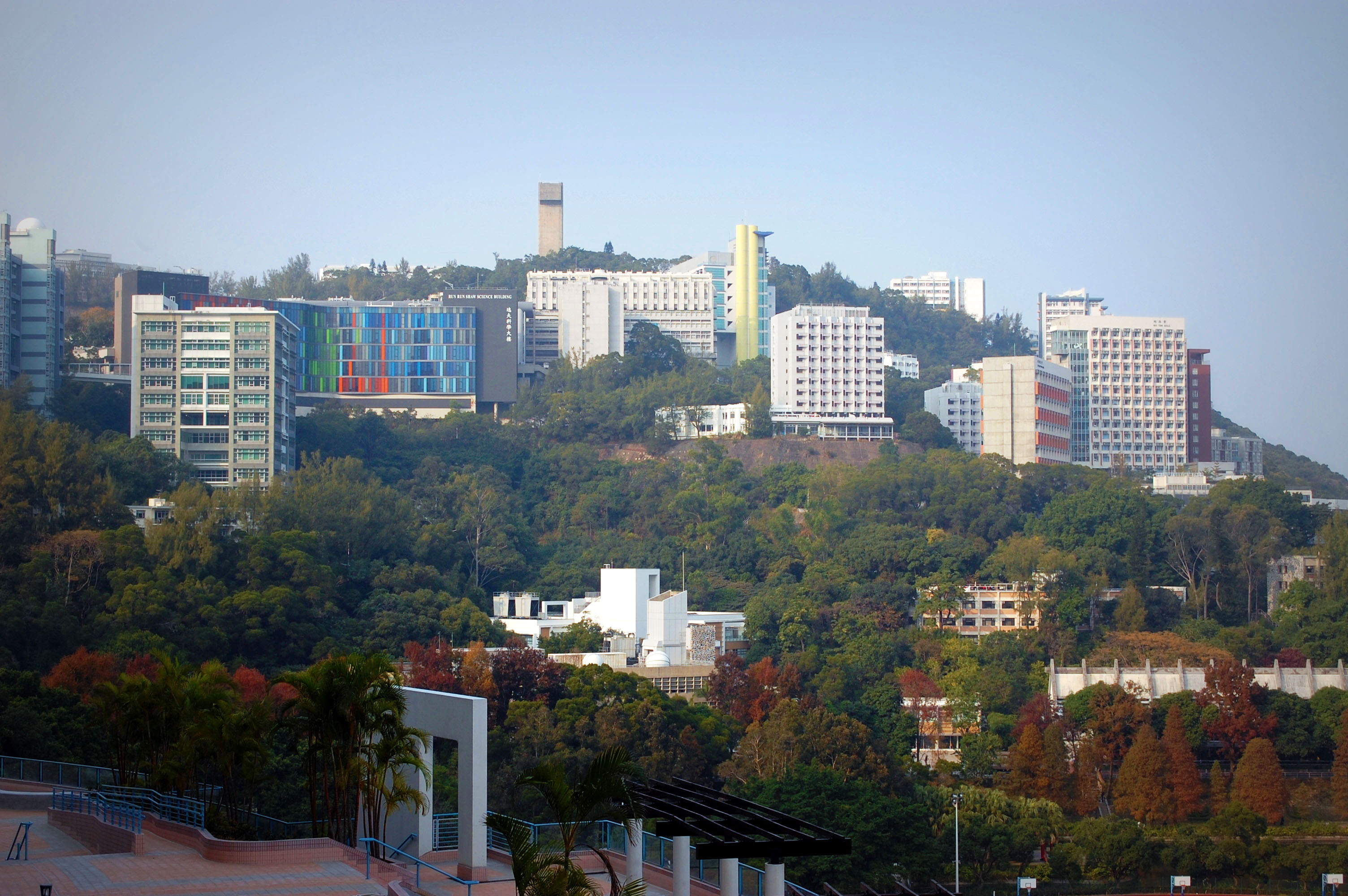
The Chinese University of Hong Kong

Since March 2016, the death toll has started to climb. Statistics show that in 2017, the number of suicides among young people under the age of 19 was 36, 50% more than 24 in 2016. Paul Yip, founding director of the Centre for Suicide Research and Prevention at Hong Kong University, discussing the education environment and the traditional Asian family expectation to their kids are the major factor to the student's suicide.

=== Tide of Student Suicides in 2016 ===
The "Tide of Student Suicide" began in the 2015/16 school year. Student suicide cases have become more frequent than before, and have since drawn the attention of the media. In the first 9 days of March, there were 7 cases, 3 of which were from The Chinese University of Hong Kong. As of the beginning of the school year in September 2015, the number of suicides and attempted suicides were as high as 20 cases.

On March 21, 2016, the Legislative Council Education Affairs Committee held a special meeting regarding student suicide. The Secretary for Education, Mr. Eddie Ng Hak-Kim said that in consideration of the urgency of the incident, he decided to allocate $5 million to the special services and provide a $5,000 "Special Allowance for the "Family and School Co-operation Scheme" to all primary and secondary schools in Hong Kong. The Parent-Teacher Association organised "Parent-teacher and Parent-child" activities to support students' mental health.

Some government members criticised the existing education system for the suicides and asked Mr.Ng to review the education policy in order to reduce the pressure on school children. Michael Tien, from The New People's Party, said, "Students nowadays have to stay in school for around 10 hours. Students have to do 7 to 10 hours of homework on average, and 23 homework assignments have been issued during the holidays." Mr.Ng responded that he had discussed the problem to the school and thought that the amount of homework was too much. Mr.Ng claimed, "If there were 23 (assignments) set, please show (evidence)."

In 2026, government statistics show that there were 91 cases of student suicides reported by primary and secondary schools in Hong Kong from 2023 to 2025.

=== Teacher suicide cases ===
In 2019 March, A 48-year-old primary school teacher jumped from the sixth-floor corridor of the school she worked in, in the morning at 7:30 am. Her younger brother said that she was suspected to be affected by work pressure before her death and that the principal had many unreasonable demands. She was not able to take sick leave and had no time to visit the clinic. Moreover, the principal did not propose a suicide treatment plan or condolences for the teacher’s family. The principal was later sent to a mental hospital as she could not withstand the pressure of public opinion. McCarthy shows that the education system in Hong Kong carries a high pressure on students, also to the teachers.

== Government response ==
The Hong Kong Special Administrative Region Government provided five major measures to help students in September 2016. The five major measures are as follows: Firstly, Set up a task force to comprehensively understand the causes of suicide analysis and propose prevention methods. Secondly, hold five regional seminars to arrange educational psychologists and student counselling professionals to introduce methods for preventing suicide and discriminating students with problems; Thirdly, Organizing teacher lectures to teach methods and related support for identifying problematic students; Fourthly. Establishing a dedicated team within the bureau to invite educational psychologists and counselors to provide support to schools with special needs; Finally, Schools, parents With the students as the object, make a small knowledge kit.

The Education Bureau has allocated additional resources to support schools to provide quality education funds of up to HK$200,000. Organize the "Good Mood @ School" program to promote mental health and raise students' awareness and awareness of mental health in schools. Increase more resources in order to implement other work.

The Secretary for Education, Mr. Eddie Ng Hak-Kim, cited the report of the Suicide Prevention Committee on October 14, 2016, saying that the suicide of college students stemmed from the lack of career planning, and students nowadays are not able to handle their pressure and give up their life easily.

== Helplines ==
=== The Samaritans Hong Kong ===
The Samaritan Hong Kong is a non-profit and non-religious group which providing confidential emotional support to people who are suicidal or are in general distress. This services available for everyone regardless of age, creed, ethnicity, gender or sexual orientation. The Samaritans is providing 24-hour multilingual hotline service which is operated by unpaid and trained volunteers. Since 1974, they have received more than 570,000 phone calls from callers ranging in age from 8 to 80.

The purpose of the Samaritan Society is to provide emotional support to those who are desperate or suicidal. Samaritan believe that everyone has the right to control their own destiny – including ending their lives. Samaritan will not suggest what you should do also will not evaluate who you are. Providing emotional support for whoever unconditionally.

==== History of The Samaritan Hong Kong ====
The Hong Kong Samaritan Suicide Prevention Society was established in July 1960. The founder 杜學魁, formerly known as The Suicide Prevention Society, launched with a telephone counselling service at Shanlin Road. In October 1963, it became one of the member of the society and changed the name to The Hong Kong Samaritans.

In 1965, due to the demolition of the venue, the government allocated the rent at Tiger Rock District.

In 1975, the second office was opened at Wan Chai in Hong Kong Island.

In 1976, it changed to the current name "The Samaritan Befrienders Hong Kong".

In 1977, it became a member of the Community Chest.

In 1978, the Marino Herdsmen Centre rented a place at the Princess Margaret Road Herdsman's Centre at a nominal rent of 10 yuan. The Ho Man Tin Club was officially opened until 1980, due to the lack of human resources.

In 1982, the English Department was closed due to the lack of human resources.

In 1985, it moved to Shuncheng Village in Kowloon. It was converted to a registered company in 1994 and was successfully exempted from the donation tax. In the same year, with the assistance of the Social Welfare Department, the Housing Department has allocated the new clubhouse, staff office, and hotline service at the ground floor of the Lam Kam Estate, and the Shun Lee Estate Club will continue to serve as hotline service and training.

==== Services provided ====
The service Samaritan provide is called Befriending. Befriending allows every callers to express their fears, worries, hopeless and feelings, in complete confidence, to a Samaritan volunteer who listens supportively, unconditionally and non-judgmentally. Callers can confide in their service in their personal way and in their own time. The listening service is supported entirely by a group of unpaid, well trained volunteers, who donate on average 11,400 hours a year to the listening service.

=== Suicide Prevention Services ===
The Suicide Prevention Services is a volunteer service agency in Hong Kong that provides counselling services for people who are suicidal, desperate and having emotional problems. The venue is located at Yidong Building and Dongtou Village in Kowloon. On January 10, 2011, it moved to the new site in Pingshi Village. The goal for Suicide prevention Services is raising general awareness towards suicide and identifying ways in which suicide can be effectively addressed.

==== History of Suicide Prevention Services ====
The predecessor of the Suicide Prevention Services, The Samaritans (Providing cantonese speaking service only), was established in 1995 under the Societies Ordinance. It provides a 12-hour daily hotline counselling service.

In 1997, the hotline service was extended to 18 Hours.

In 1998, it provide a 24-hour operational service.

In 1999, the first SPS Charity Walk was organised.

In 2000, the English name was officially changed to the current "Suicide Prevention Services".

In 2002, launch of Suicide Prevention Service for Youths – "SHKP Operation Sunshine".

In 2004, the first SPS Flag Day was held.

In 2011, applied for registration to become Suicide Prevention Services Limited.

==== Services provided ====
- 24-hour Suicide Prevention Hotline Service
- Suicide Prevention Services for the Elderly
- Services for Survivors of Suicide Loss
- Community & Life Education
- Volunteer Training & Support

== See also ==
- Hong Kong
- Education System in Hong Kong
- Youth Suicide in Hong Kong
- British Hong Kong
- History of Hong Kong
- Suicide Prevention
- List of Suicide
- Culture of Hong Kong
