= The Samaritans Hong Kong =

Suicide prevention hotline

- Type: Charity
- Genre: Voluntary agency
- Headquarters: Hong Kong
- Area served: Hong Kong
- Key people: Volunteers
- Website: www.samaritans.org.hk

The Samaritans Hong Kong (Chinese: 撒瑪利亞會) is a free 24-hour multilingual suicide prevention hotline in Hong Kong. It is a non-religious charity that provides confidential emotional support to all people, irrespective of race, creed, age or status, who are in emotional distress or suicidal. The organisation is registered as a charity in Hong Kong, and governed by its unpaid volunteers.

There are about 110 active volunteers with the Samaritans Hong Kong, speaking 14 languages. All of its volunteers speak at least English as one of their languages.

== History ==
=== Formation ===
Andrew Tu, originally from Inner Mongolia of the Republic of China, and Elsie Tu, GBM, a missionary from Newcastle-upon-Tyne of England who came to Hong Kong in the 1950s, began their work by helping the region's underprivileged children. They established the Mu Kuang English School. Working at this school in 1973 was Dave Tredrea, an ex-Samaritan from the United Kingdom, who was pivotal in shaping the local suicide prevention activities similar to that of his home country.

Chad Varah, founder of the Samaritans in the United Kingdom, visited Hong Kong in 1974. He was instrumental in the formation of the Samaritans Hong Kong. It became the first overseas branch of the Samaritans, initially with 20 volunteers, and with Andrew Tu as its first Director. The branch shared an office with Elsie Tu's clinic at Lo Fu Ngam Public Housing Estate (now known as Lok Fu Estate).

=== The Wanchai Centre ===
In April 1976, the Samaritans moved to a new office in the Sailors and Soldiers Home at 22 Hennessy Road in Wanchai. The centre comprised two tiny rooms separated by a corridor, and provided a service 24 hours a day, 365 days a year, plus a "flying squad" for emergencies. The two small rooms were replaced by two larger ones in the same building in 1979.

Vanda Scott, who later became Director General of the Befrienders International in the United Kingdom, was the director of Samaritans Hong Kong from 1980 to 1982.

=== Split into two branches ===
By the late 1970s, there was a growing number of English-speaking expatriates joining the Samaritans Hong Kong to become volunteers so that it was able to strengthen their service to the non-Chinese speaking callers. From the beginning of 1982, this branch of the Samaritans was renamed as The Samaritans (English Speaking Service), concentrating their efforts to the non-Chinese speaking community. The original branch, now known as The Samaritan Befrienders Hong Kong, continued to devote their energy to the Chinese speaking community.

=== Wanchai MTR ===
The organisation moved to a room at the Wanchai MTR Station at the beginning of 1987.

The organisation hosted an international conference in April 1991 on the helping skills in suicide prevention, which was attended by fellow Samaritans throughout the world.

With a growing number of Chinese speaking callers and an increasing number of Chinese speaking volunteers, the organisation changed to a multilingual hotline in 1991, instead of just serving English speaking callers.

=== Chai Wan Centre ===
In January 1993, the organisation moved its hotline operation to another centre at Chai Wan. Volunteer selection, training and other operations have been conducted at the new venue since.

Rev. Chad Varah (the founder of Samaritans Worldwide) visited the Samaritans Hong Kong after a Samaritans biennial conference held in Sri Lanka in the summer of 1994. With effect from 1994, its 20th anniversary, the organisation was renamed as The Samaritans, multi-lingual suicide prevention hotline.

== Services offered ==
=== 24-Hour suicide prevention hotline ===
Apart from a free 24-hour hotline service, offering multilingual emotional support, the organisation provides the following services:

=== Flying Squad ===
The organisation has a group of volunteers ready to visit callers in dire situations.

=== E-mail services ===
The organisation started to train volunteers to be conversant with the skills in providing support through e-mail, and by early 1997 the organisation joined forces with the Befrienders International e-mail team to provide e-mail service to global callers as an alternative means to hotline calls. The Samaritans Hong Kong was the first organisation under the Befrienders International to operate e-mail support outside of UK.

=== Student Suicide Prevention Ambassadors training programs ===
School children in Hong Kong are known to be sufferers from pressure arising partly from their studies and examinations, and partly from the temptation of substance abuse. Consequently, in 1998, the organisation started a project, in collaboration with Kely Support Group and the Outward Bound Hong Kong, known as the SKO Project, to train senior students from secondary schools to be aware of suicide risks in their peers and in the community at large, the skills needed to recognise the danger signs and how to respond to them, as well as life coping skills. This project was revamped and renamed the Youth Suicide Prevention Project (YSPP). The project is now further tailored to operate in Chinese and runs twice annually, each time admitting 40 students from secondary schools.

=== Support to People Bereaved by Suicide ===
People Bereaved By Suicide (PBS) – The Samaritans have organised an ongoing support group for those affected by the suicide of a relative or friend. The pain and emotional distress felt by people bereaved by suicide can be frightening. Shock, anger, guilt, shame and depression are among the many emotions felt. The PBS aims to provide a safe, confidential environment, in which bereaved people can share their experiences and feelings, thus giving and gaining support from each other.

=== Outreach ===
As a public service to the community the Samaritans give talks to organisations, societies and groups to raise awareness to Hong Kong people about the services the Samaritans can offer.

== Governance ==
The Samaritans Hong Kong is governed by unpaid volunteers. The 110+ volunteers elect a board of directors to oversee finance and fundraising, and a chief executive to be responsible for the general operation of the organisation. The board of directors and the chief executive are unpaid volunteers.

There are seven paid staff at the Samaritans Hong Kong to assist the volunteers in administrative and fundraising and publicity matters. The paid staff are not involved in the operation of the hotline.

== See also ==
- Samaritans
- The Samaritan Befrienders Hong Kong
- Crisis hotline
- Suicide prevention
