= List of suicide crisis lines =

A suicide crisis line (also known as a crisis hotline) is a service that provides immediate, confidential support to people experiencing emotional distress or suicidal ideation via telephone, text messaging, or online chat. They are connected with trained counselors who offer crisis intervention, emotional support, and referrals to appropriate mental health resources. Each hotline typically operates within a single nation or region and is run by a government agency, a non-profit organization, or a charity.

While many countries have dedicated mental health crisis lines, a significant number of nations and territories—particularly in Sub-Saharan Africa and Central Asia—do not. In regions where a general service is unavailable, specialized hotlines may operate for violence against women or child welfare. Alternatively, people in these countries can receive support through international organizations such as Befrienders Worldwide, Lifeline International, and the mental health programs of the International Federation of Red Cross and Red Crescent Societies (IFRC).

Even when a general crisis line is available, people from marginalized communities—such as LGBTQ+ individuals or survivors of domestic violence or sexual abuse—may prefer to utilize specialized hotlines tailored to their specific identities or circumstances.

The following list of general suicide crisis lines is organized by geographic region and arranged alphabetically by country within each region.

== List by country ==
The telephone numbers in this list do not include international country codes. They are formatted for domestic dialing, allowing a caller within the respective country or territory to connect by dialing the digits exactly as displayed.

=== Africa ===
Country	Contact
Algeria	0560 00 13 38
Benin	7344
Botswana	75 527 590
Burundi	69 77 63 67
Cameroon	242 136 136
Egypt	16328
Eswatini	2404 3160
Ethiopia	8335
Ghana	024 447 1279
Ivory Coast	143
Kenya	0722 178 177
Liberia	6534308
Malawi	0999 399 765 (Airtel) 885 400 502 (TNM)
Mali	8000 1115
Mayotte	3114
Morocco	0522 25 25 25
Mauritius	800 93 93
Namibia	116
Nigeria	0800 078 7746
Réunion	3114
Rwanda	8015
São Tomé and Príncipe	222 2222
Senegal	33 889 38 00
Seychelles	432 3535
Sierra Leone	078 522 787
South Africa	0800 567 567
South Sudan	778
Sudan	011 555 253
Tanzania	199
Togo	2221 1234
Tunisia	8010 3666
Uganda	0800 21 21 21
Zambia	096 026 4040
Zimbabwe	029 226 5000

=== Caribbean ===
Country	Contact
Anguilla	(264) 772-7233
Antigua and Barbuda	(268) 463-5555
Aruba	131
Bahamas	(242) 328-0922
Barbados	(246) 536-4500
Bermuda	(441) 239-1111
Cayman Islands	1-800-534-6463
Cuba	103
Curaçao	918
Dominica	767-317-3030
Dominican Republic	809-200-1400
Grenada	(473) 440-6849
Guadeloupe	3114
Haiti	116
Jamaica	(888) 639-5433
Martinique	3114
Puerto Rico	988
Saint Barthélemy	3114
Saint Kitts and Nevis	(869) 465-5000
Saint Lucia	203
Saint Martin	3114
Saint Vincent and the Grenadines	(784) 456-1044
Sint Maarten	721 585-5556
Trinidad and Tobago	800-5588
United States Virgin Islands	988

=== Central America ===
Country	Contact
Costa Rica	800 273 7869
El Salvador	126
Guatemala	1503
Honduras	150
Nicaragua	2222 4830
Panama	147

=== North America ===
Country/Region	Contact
Canada	988
Greenland	801180
Mexico	55-5259-8121
Quebec	1-866-277-3553
Saint Pierre and Miquelon	3114
United States	988 Veterans & Military: Press 1 · Text 838255; Spanish (Español): Press 2 · Text AYUDA; LGBTQ+ Youth (under 25): Press 3 · Text YOUTH

=== South America ===
Country	Contact
Argentina	0800 999 0091
Bolivia	800 11 3040
Brazil	188
Chile	*4141
Colombia	106
Ecuador	171 (Press 6)
Falkland Islands	51515
French Guiana	3114
Guyana	915
Paraguay	155
Peru	113 (Press 5)
Suriname	123
Uruguay	0800 0767
Venezuela	0424-290-7338

=== Asia ===
Country	Contact
Bahrain	3844 7588 (English); 6671 0901 (Arabic)
Bangladesh	09638 881 888
Bhutan	1010
Brunei	145
Cambodia	017 222 372
China	12355
Georgia	116 123
Hong Kong	2389 2222
India	14416
Indonesia	119 (Press 8)
Iran	1480
Iraq	0750 309 6649; 053 339 0840
Israel	1201
Japan	0120 061 338
Jordan	079 544 0416
Kazakhstan	150
Kuwait	147
Kyrgyzstan	111
Laos	1362
Lebanon	1564
Macau	2852 5222
Malaysia	15555
Maldives	1677
Mongolia	1800-2000
Myanmar	09 765 400 200
Nepal	1166
Oman	800-77788
Pakistan	0304 111 1741
Palestine	164
Philippines	1553
Qatar	16000 (Press 4)
Saudi Arabia	9200 33360
Singapore	1767
South Korea	109
Sri Lanka	1926
Syria	0944 868 444
Taiwan	1925
Tajikistan	935 50 50 50
Thailand	1323
Timor-Leste	7725 4597
Turkiye	183
Turkmenistan	8 (12) 229 389
United Arab Emirates	800 4673
Uzbekistan	71 276 49 66
Vietnam	1900 6233
Yemen	8000202

=== Europe ===
Country	Contact
Åland Islands	116 123
Albania	0800 12345
Andorra	177
Armenia	0800 00 900
Austria	142
Belarus	8 (017) 311-00-99
Belgium	107
Bosnia and Herzegovina	080 05 03 05
Bulgaria	0 8001 1466
Croatia	0800 655 222
Cyprus	8000 7773
Czech Republic	116 123
Denmark	70 201 201
England	116 123
Estonia	116 123
Faroe Islands	00 45 70 201 201
Finland	09 2525 0111
France	3114
Germany	116 123; 0800 111 0111; 0800 111 0222
Gibraltar	116 123
Greece	1018
Guernsey	116 123
Hungary	116123
Iceland	1717
Ireland	116 123
Isle of Man	0808 802 1221
Italy	02 99777
Jersey	116 123
Kosovo	0800 12345
Latvia	116123
Liechtenstein	147
Lithuania	116 123
Luxembourg	45-45-45
Malta	179
Moldova	022 593 593
Monaco	0800 91 90 10
Montenegro	116 111
Netherlands	113
North Macedonia	070 390 632
Northern Ireland	0808 808 8000
Norway	116 123
Poland	116 123
Portugal	1411
Romania	0374 456 420
Russia	8 (495) 989-50-50
San Marino	800 995 988
Scotland	0800 83 85 87
Serbia	0800/309-309
Slovakia	0800 800 566
Slovenia	116 123
Spain	024
Svalbard	116 123
Sweden	90101
Switzerland	143
Ukraine	0800100102
United Kingdom	116 123
United Kingdom	0800 58 58 58 (5pm - midnight)
Vatican City	06 7720 8977
Wales	0800 132 737

=== Oceania ===
Country	Contact
American Samoa	988
Australia	13 11 14
Fiji	1543
French Polynesia; Tahiti	444 767; 89 20 25 23 (Vodafone); 87 20 25 23 (Vini)
Guam	988
Kiribati	189
Marshall Islands	988
Nauru	249
New Caledonia	05 30 30
New Zealand	1737
Norfolk Island	13 11 14
Northern Mariana Islands	988
Palau	988
Papua New Guinea	7147 1518
Samoa	800 7874
Solomon Islands	699
Tonga	22091
Vanuatu	7716156 (Vodafone); 7716155 (Digicel)
