= Kids Helpline =

Mental health youth support service in Australia

- Services: Phone counselling Online counselling Email counselling
- Affiliations: yourtown
- Website: kidshelpline.com.au

Kids Helpline is a free Australian telephone and online counselling service for young people aged between 5 and 25. Counsellors respond to calls about issues ranging from relationship breakdown and bullying to sexual abuse, homelessness, suicidal thoughts, depression and drug and alcohol usage.

== Funding ==
The service is primarily funded by yourtown, an Australian youth community services organisation, which provides the Kids Helpline service. Supported by the Australian Government (through the Department of Health, Disability and Ageing and the Australian Human Rights Commission), the Queensland Government, and Government of Western Australia. It is also supported by corporate sponsors, Optus, Bupa, Future Generation Investment Company, and First National Real Estate.

== Counselling methods ==
All counsellors that provide services through Kids Helpline are employees of yourtown, all holding university degrees in psychology counseling, or a related field, with a minimum year's worth of experience in counseling.

- Phone Counselling. Free counselling over the phone available at all times, on 1800 55 1800. The service is a freecall number from all mobiles on Australian carriers, landlines and public payphones.
- Online Counselling. Called 'WebChat', Kids Helpline counselling is also available online through the website. This service is available 24 hours a day, 7 days a week. Generally, this service has high wait times, ranging up to 50 minutes during peak times in evenings.

Long-term users of the service can also access case management through Kids Helpline, as well as "wrap around care" where a trusted adult is involved in ensuring a child's welfare. Kids Helpline can also refer patients onwards to more formal and in-person services.

Kids Helpline previously had Email Counselling, but ceased to provide this service.

== See also ==
- Crisis hotline
- List of suicide crisis lines
- Lifeline (crisis support service)
- Beyond Blue
