= Shun Tak (disambiguation) =

Shun Tak or Shuntak is the Cantonese romanisation of Shunde, a district of Foshan in Guangdong Province in China.

Shun Tak may also refer to:

- Shun Tak Holdings, a company based in Hong Kong
- Shun Tak Centre, a building in Hong Kong
- Shun Tak Fraternal Association Leung Kau Kui College, a school in Hong Kong
