= Student suicides in Hong Kong =

In Hong Kong, the suicide rate of primary, secondary, and post-secondary students is relatively high, particularly beginning in the 2014–2015 academic year. The suicide cases are not connected, but the frequency of suicides aroused public's attention to the mental health and academic pressure of Hong Kong students.

== General background ==
=== Statistics ===
Since the commencement of the 2015 school year, a large number of students have committed suicide. Over 70 suicide cases were reported from 2015 to 2017. The alarming frequency of youth suicide is very worrying as the numbers continue to rise. This has raised concerns that students in Hong Kong face too much academic stress. Based on records from the Coroner's Court, there were 70 suicide incidents of individuals aged 15–24 in 2015 and 23 of them were full-time students.

Various media reports state that suicide can be contagious and can intensify copycat effect. This illustrates that more deaths could occur. The distribution of deaths is shown below:

School Year	Primary and Secondary	Post-secondary
2015–2016	22	16
2016–2017	17	15
2017–2018	13	12

It is worth to note that the current data on primary and secondary suicide cases also reveal a significant association between gender and mental illness. In Hong Kong, male suicide rates outnumber female deaths. The Final Report published by the Committee on Prevention of Student Suicides (Chinese: 防止學生自殺委員會) suggested the reason may be an unwillingness amongst men to talk openly with health care professionals and treat mental disorders. This is contrary to females who are more likely to seek help.

== List of suicide cases ==
Below are lists of reported student suicides

=== 2014–2015 academic year ===
Student	Age	Grade (School)	Date	Reference
Chan	15	Secondary 3	15 October 2014	
Wong	19	Secondary 6	9 March 2015	
Chan	22	Bachelor's degree year 5 (Education University of Hong Kong)	24 March 2015	

=== 2015–2016 academic year ===
Student	Age	Grade (School)	Date	Reference
Chan	21	Associate degree	26 July 2015	
Chow	17	Secondary 5	2 August 2015	
Boy	19	Studying overseas	12 August 2015	
Chan	21	Bachelor's degree (Hong Kong Chinese University)	7 September 2015	
Chan	11	Secondary 1	10 September 2015	
Chu	13	Secondary 1	23 September 2015	
Lam	15	gap year	23 October 2015	
Ng	17	Post-secondary IVE	24 October 2015	
Wong	21	University (Hong Kong Shue Yan University)	4 November 2015	
Ng	21	Bachelor's degree 2 (Hong Kong Polytechnic University)	4 November 2015	
Leung	18	Bachelor's degree 1 (Hong Kong Chinese University)	19 November 2015	
Tse	21	Diploma (VTC)	14 December 2015	
Chan	22	Bachelor's degree 4 (Hong Kong Chinese University)	15 December 2015	
Wong	15	Secondary 4	16 December 2015	
Cheung	18	Secondary 6	28 December 2015	
Ho	15	Secondary 4 (CNEC Lee I Yao Memorial Secondary School)	4 January 2016	
Siu	19	Bachelor's degree 1 (Hong Kong Shue Yan University)	6 January 2016	
Lee	20	Secondary 6	17 January 2016	
Lam	14	Grade 9 (Secondary 3) (Hong Kong International School)	18 January 2016	
Wong	21	Bachelor's degree 4 (Hong Kong Chinese University)	20 January 2016	
Lai	12	Secondary 1	12 February 2016	
Ng	16	Secondary 5	18 February 2016	
Cheung	20	Bachelor's degree 3 (Hong Kong Chinese University)	5 March 2016	
Chow	15	Secondary 4 (St. Bonaventure College and High School)	7 March 2016	
Ng	12	Secondary 1 (Buddhist Sum Heung Lam Memorial College)	8 March 2016	
So	20	Bachelor's degree 3 (University of Hong Kong)	8 March 2016	
Cheung	20	Studying overseas	11 March 2016	
Tam	11	Primary 6	12 March 2016	
Yip	21	Bachelor's degree 3 (Hong Kong Polytechnic University)	13 March 2016	
Chau	22	Bachelor's degree 4 (Hong Kong Polytechnic University)	26 March 2016	
Kwan	17	Grade 11 (Secondary 5) (Po Leung Kuk Choi Kai Yau School)	27 March 2016	
Yeung	20	DSE Retaker	4 April 2016	
Siu	17	Secondary 4	13 April 2016	
So	22	Hong Kong Academy for Performing Arts year 4	14 April 2016	
Tse	16	Secondary 3	19 April 2016	
Wong	18	Studying overseas	24 April 2016	
Lau	18	DSE	10 June 2016	
Ng	20	DSE	17 June 2016	
Wong	14	Grade 10 (Secondary 4) (Yew Chung International School)	23 June 2016	
Tse	19	Diploma; UOW College Hong Kong (城大專上學院)）	22 July 2016	

=== 2016–2017 academic year ===
Student	Age	Grade (School)	Date	Reference
Lee	17	Secondary 5 (中華基督教青年會中學)	2016/8/5	
Cheung	22	Bachelor's degree 3 (Chinese University of Hong Kong)	2016/8/26	
Boy	20	Bachelor's degree 2 (Hong Kong Institute of Vocational Education)	2016/9/13	
Leung	20	Secondary 6 graduate (New Territories Heung Yee Kuk Yuen Long District Secondary School)	2016/9/28	
Wong	16	VTC student	2016/10/4	
Chan	17	Gap year	2016/10/14	
Lau	19	Year 2 (Hong Kong Institute of Vocational Education)	2016/10/16	
Lee	13	Secondary 2	2016/11/1	
Fung	21	Bachelor's degree 4 (香港樹仁大學)	2016/11/12	
Chung	20	Bachelor's degree 3 (Lingnan University)	2016/11/21	
So	20	Bachelor's degree 2 (Hong Kong Polytechnic University)	2016/11/21	
Tsui	16	Secondary 3 (北角培僑中學)	2016/11/23	
Ho	19	Associate degree	2016/12/10	
Tsim	15	Secondary 2	2016/12/12	
Ng	16	Secondary 5 (Tung Chung Catholic School)	2016/12/16	
Leung	13	Secondary 2	2016/12/16	
Ko	19	Bachelor's degree 3 (Hong Kong Baptist University)	2016/12/19	
Chu	25	Secondary graduate	2017/1/12	
Lam	19	gap year	2017/1/22	
Yeung	21	Associate degree 2 (Hong Kong Polytechnic University)	2017/1/24	
Law	19	Year 2 (Hong Kong Institute of Vocational Education)	2017/2/2	
Law	16	Secondary 4	2017/2/5	
Tsoi	13	Secondary 1	2017/2/6	
Tam	15	Secondary 4	2017/2/12	
Boy	15	Grade 11 (Secondary 5) (West Island School)	2017/2/17	
Lung	13	Secondary 2	2017/2/21	
Boy	19	Studying overseas	2017/2/28	
Lau	13	Secondary 2	2017/3/1	
Tam	21	Associate degree student	2017/3/9	
Lee	18	Secondary 5	2017/3/15	
Wong	21	Bachelor's degree 3 (Hong Kong Polytechnic University)	2017/3/17	
Cheung	20	Associate degree student	2017/3/20	
Leung	17	Secondary 4 (Tung Wah Group of Hospitals Kap Yan Directors' College)	2017/3/21	
Girl	21	Bachelor's degree 3 (Exchange in CUHK)	2017/4/3	
Chan	10	Primary student	2017/4/5	
Fong	19	Gap year	2017/4/9	
Lee	23	Nursing school year 2 (屯門醫院普通科護士學校)	2017/4/12	
Chan	20	HKU School of Professional and Continuing Education	2017/4/19	
Lau	15	Secondary 3	2017/4/27	
Yung	22	IVE	2017/6/26	
Sun	19	Studying overseas	2017/6/28	
Ho	23	Bachelor's degree 4 (Hong Kong Polytechnic University)	2017/7/5	
Girl	21	UniversityCity University of Hong Kong	2017/7/11	
Lam	17	Secondary 5	2017/7/27	
To	17	Secondary 4	2017/7/31	

=== 2017–2018 academic year ===
Student	Age	Grade (School)	Date	Reference
Wong	18	Studying overseas	2017/8/6	
Ho	17	gap year	2017/8/10	
Mak	21	Bachelor's degree 3 (Chinese University of Hong Kong)	2017/8/13	
Ho	15	Secondary 4	2017/8/26	
Lam	19	Post-secondary (IVE)	2017/8/31	
Fung	23	Studying overseas	2017/9/2	
Man	16	Secondary 5	2017/9/5	
Ng	17	Secondary 6 (元朗公立中學校友會鄧兆棠中學)	2017/9/25	
Ng	20	Associate degree (Hong Kong Nang Yan College of Higher Education)	2017/10/6	
Tsang	11	Primary 6	2017/10/12	
Mak	17	Secondary 6 (油塘天主教普照中學)	2017/10/12	
Chau	19	gap year	2017/10/20	
Lam	21	part time student	2017年11月6日	
Chin	17	Secondary 6 (United Christian College (Kowloon East))	2017/11/20	
Kan	19	Associate degree (gap year)	2017/11/23	
Chan	16	Secondary 5	2017/11/28	
Lau	21	Bachelor's degree 1 (Chinese University of Hong Kong)	2017/12/9	
Wong	15	Secondary 4	2017/12/10	
Hung	25	Bachelor's degree 4 (Hong Kong Baptist University)	2017/12/15	
Chow	23	Bachelor's degree 4 (Hong Kong Polytechnic University)	2017/12/17	
Hung	14	Secondary 3 (Shun Tak Fraternal Association Leung Kau Kui College)	2018/1/2	
Wong	17	Secondary 6 (Po Leung Kuk Celine Ho Yam Tong College)	2018/1/2	
Lam	17	Gap year	2018/1/14	
Tsoi	19	Bachelor's degree 1 (Chinese University of Hong Kong)	2018/1/16	
Chan	17	Secondary 6	2018/1/26	
Cheung	21	Secondary 6 (中華基督教會公理高中書院)	2018/2/19	
Lam	16	Secondary 5 (中華傳道會李賢堯紀念中學)	2018/2/28	
Wan	25	Bachelor's degree 2 (Hong Kong Polytechnic University設計學院)	2018/4/5/	
Mak	14	Secondary 5 (神召會康樂中學)	2018/5/6	
Leung	22	Bachelor's degree 4 (Chinese University of Hong Kong)	2018/5/26	
Cheung	20	University (Hong Kong Polytechnic University)	2018/5/29	
Poon	11	Primary 5	2018/6/19	
Lee	16	Gap year	2018/6/20	

=== 2018–2019 academic year ===
Student	Age	Grade (School)	Date	Reference
Sum	21	gap year	2018/8/1	
Tsui	19	University (The Open University of Hong Kong)	2018/8/4	
Yuen	17	University (University of Hong Kong)	2018/8/13	
Fan	21	University	2018/8/17	
Choi	22	Bachelor's degree 4	2018/8/22	
Cheung	34	Computer course	2018/8/30	
Wong	20	University	2018/9/19	
Lee	19	Bachelor's degree 2 (Chinese University of Hong Kong)	2018/9/21	
Wong	17	Secondary 6	2018/10/6	
Lung	18	展亮技能發展中心	2018/10/7	
LAm	17	Secondary 6 (Shun Tak Fraternal Association Leung Kau Kui College)	2018/10/8	
Sum	13	Secondary 2 (迦密中學)	2018/10/10	
Chung	10	Primary 5	2018/10/13	
Leung	22	University (Hong Kong Polytechnic University)	2018/11/2	
Ng	12	Secondary 1	2018/11/11	
Lui	22	Post-graduate degree (Hong Kong University of Science and Technology)	2018/11/16	
Chan	24	Bachelor's degree 5 (University of Hong Kong)	2018/12/10	
Leung	19	Bachelor's degree 2 (University of Hong Kong)	2018/12/10	
Chan	16	Secondary 5	2019/1/6	
Lai	17	Secondary 6	2019/1/14	
Lee	16	Secondary 4	2019/3/14	
Poon	16	Secondary 5	2019/3/15	

=== 2020–2021 academic year ===
Student	Age	Grade (School)	Date	Reference
Girl/Boy	15	Year 11	2020/11/12	
Wong	12	Secondary 1	2021/11/11	

=== Causes of suicide ===
There can be many reasons for suicide. A number of reasons can intertwined with each other and lead an individual to take their own life.

==== Education in Hong Kong ====
In Hong Kong, "academic results determines the future" is a very common notion. Teachers, parents and students focus on attaining good academic results. This puts great pressure on students to pursue academic excellence. The Hong Kong Diploma of Secondary Education (HKDSE) is seen as a "one-off exam". In a poll conducted by the "New Youth World", students rated their level of pressure as 7.44 out of 10 under HKDSE. The life planning support is insufficient in Hong Kong. Students see hard work as their only way out. The pressure is so much so that students neglect their own capabilities and interests. Therefore, students easily feel stressed when they are not performing well academically.

==== Copycat suicides ====
Suicide cluster is an emulation of another suicide that the person attempting suicide knows about, either from local knowledge or due to accounts or depictions of the original suicide on Television and in other media. Imitative suicide is common in the under-25 age group. In Hong Kong, it has been suggested that due to the widespread news report of youth suicide, students are driven to copy such suicides.

==== Psychological concerns ====
In 2015–2016, 24 out of 38 suicide cases involved psychological factors. showed that 13 victims displayed, suicidal ideation and 17 victims showed feelings of hopelessness. However, vital psychological support from schools, teachers, social workers and parents was not enough at that time. Unfortunately, this has not changed; many students still feel alone and helpless and see suicide as their only way out.

=== Existing support ===
The help and resources available for students is divided into three categories: universal help (for students in general), selective help (for vulnerable students) and indicated help (for students who are at risk of committing suicide).

Universal help consists of information, workshops and other tools to help and improve mental health and prevent suicide. This helps raise awareness of the topics of mental health and suicide. It is also possible for schools to apply for up to HKD$150,000 from the Quality Education Fund to finance activities related to the well-being of students.

Selective help is aimed at students with a heightened risk of suicide. An example of selective help can be screening tools to find at-risk cases in time. For example, The Centre for Suicide Research provide interactive advice on their web page. This advice is aimed towards teachers, parents and friends who are worried that someone close to them may be at risk of suicide.

Indicated help is aimed at students who are at a high risk of committing suicide. Post-secondary institutions are advised to have a 24 hours hotline and easy access to psychiatric and psychological services. Schools do not always live up to this standard. There are multiple independent hotlines, as well as hotlines run by the Social Welfare Department. Examples of suicide hotlines are the Suicide prevention Services, The Samaritan Befrienders Hong Kong, and Youth Outreach.

== Response from the Education Bureau ==
=== Attitude of the Bureau ===
In a legislative council meeting on 16 March 2016, former legislative council member Wong Yuk-man raised the point that one of the possible causes of students suicide could be the Hong Kong's education system. This system infamously puts too much emphasis on competition. He suggested that parents and teachers barely have time to help students cope with emotional distress as there is more focus on academic results of students. He questioned the Education Bureau regarding whether it will identify the causes in the current education system that lead to enormous pressure on students.

In response to the question, former Secretary for Education Eddie Ng replied that suicide is a complex matter that has no single cause. In fact, he noted, students' academic pressure has been reduced under the implementation of New Academic Structure (NAS) in 2009. For example, students under the NAS only have to sit for one public examination, and are able to choose elective subjects in accordance with their interests and abilities to develop their potential.

He further raised the point that suicides could be prevented with better life planning.

On 13 November 2016, the Education Bureau raised a similar viewpoint. It was restated that evidence based research indicated that the cause of suicide is complicated. Reasons behind each case rarely are the same. It cannot be proved that the education system or a particular academic environment could directly lead to suicide.

=== Policies and committees ===
==== Healthy School Policy ====
In February 2010, the Education Bureau circled a memorandum encouraging the implementation of the Healthy School Policy in primary and secondary schools. Each school was encouraged to formulate their own implementation plan. This policy was first implemented in the school year of 2010–2011. The aim of the policy is divided into four different elements: developing a management and organisation system for health matters; encouraging a healthy school environment; promoting a healthy lifestyle for students and recognising of students in need; and creating a system for handling high risk students. The policy is foremost an anti substance abuse effort. It also touches upon issues related to students' mental health and student suicide.

==== Prevention of Student Suicide Committee ====
On 30 March 2016, the Educational Bureau set up the Prevention of Student Suicide Committee in response to the spate of students' suicides in the 2015–16 school year. The committee was tasked with studying student suicides in Hong Kong and thereby offering any preemptive solutions to the problem of youth suicide. The committee consists of 21 members consisting of teachers, parents, psychiatrists and the president of the student union at the University of Hong Kong. Professor Paul Yip Siu Fai (Chinese: 葉兆輝) is the director of the Centre for Suicide Research and Prevention in addition to being a chairperson in the Prevention of Student Suicide Committee.

In November 2016, the Prevention of Student Suicide Committee released their final report which presents the current understanding of the student suicide problem and possible solutions. The measures suggested in the report are, including but not limited to, enhancement of the support for families, student support in schools, and promoting the acceptance of alternative career paths. In relation to the Report, the Education Bureau has formulated several practical and follow-up actions to build a multi-layered safety net for students according to four areas. This includes promotion of students' mental well-being and health, stregtehing the support from teachers and schools, reviewing relevant domains in the education system, and inclusion of family life and parent education.

In addition to this, the Education Bureau proceeded with different policies and projects in response to the 2015–2016 student suicides and the following public discontent. Some examples are as follows: providing education material to schools so that they can identify students with difficulties and providing education to students on coping strategies and positive attitudes. In this case, the educational material for schools, parents and students consisted of pamphlets on the topic of "Enhancing Life Resilience". A memo was sent out on 24 June 2016 to inform the heads of different schools of this material.

==== Committee on Home-School Co-operation ====
The Committee on Home-School Co-operation (abbr.: CHSC), was set up after a recommendation from Education Commission. It was created to encourage cooperation between parents and teachers. Chiefly by encouraging the set-up of Parent-Teacher Association and by organising activities made to improve home-school cooperation. A memorandum was sent out on 10 June 2016 from the Secretary for Education to inform all supervisors and heads of schools. To achieve these goals the Committee on Home-School Co-operation set up three different types of grants that schools could apply for. The first category of grant, with a maximum sum of around HKD$5000, is for schools seeking to set up a Parent-Teacher Association. The second type of grant, with a maximum sum of HKD$5000, is for schools seeking to organise an activity with the purpose of encouraging home-school cooperation. Activities can, for example, be aimed at parenting training, assisting parents to support their children, or student mental health. The third type of grant is for joint Home-School Co-operation Projects.

=== Other initiatives ===
==== No-suicide contracts ====
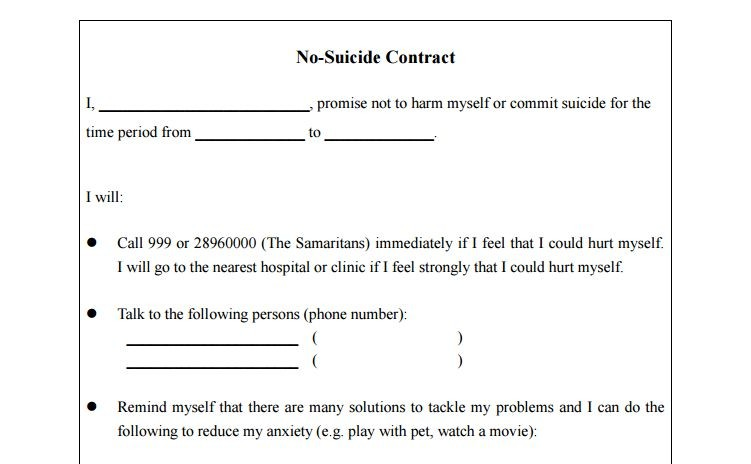
Example of no-suicide contract

No-suicide contracts for students, have been a long debated in topic in Hong Kong. Nevertheless, they are used by mental health care professionals as a way to prevent suicides. The contract is an agreement that states the student will not commit suicide or harm themselves in any way. Furthermore, the contract lists hotlines, contacts, and an emergency number that the student should call in case of suicidal thoughts. However, the No-Suicide contract is not a legal document. In March 2016 a copy of the Educational Bureaus No-Suicide Contract for students was circulated on the internet.

==== Detecting youths at risk online ====
The Prevention of Student Suicide Committee has, since 2017, been in talks with Facebook and Google about the possibility of using these platforms as a tool for detecting student at risk of committing suicide. Facebook and Google already have their own suicide detection and prevention systems.

== Criticism ==
- Hong Kong Professional Teachers' Union
  - The HKPTU criticised that the final report lacked recurrent input of resources, manpower, and concrete suggestions.
- The Civil Alliance for Student Suicide (Chinese: 防止學生自殺民間聯席)
  - The Alliance criticised that the Committee of Prevention of Student Suicide was shirking its responsibility and blaming the victims by stating that there is no substantial link between suicide incidents and the education system in the Final Report.
- Ip Kin-yuen (Legislative Councillor for Education constituency)
  - Ip felt disappointed by the Final report. It was pointed out there is no direct relationship between the education system and youth suicide. The Education Bureau is therefore, evading its responsibility and has missed the chance to review the education system. He further criticised the current education system by stating that it puts students under unnecessary pressure. He also mentioned that the Report failed to address the root problem and he therefore request more resources from the government.
- Shiu Ka-chun (Social Worker, Legislative Councillor for Social Welfare Constituency, associate director of the Center for Youth Research and Practice (Chinese: 青年研究實踐中心) at Hong Kong Baptist University)
  - Shiu suggested that youth suicide has many causes. This includes the education system, economy, societal culture and structure, to name a few. He criticised the government for ignoring the suggestion of organising a summit to address the problem and to make concrete anti-suicide policies.
- Althea Suen Hiu-nam (Chinese: 孫曉嵐) (Former president of the Hong Kong University Students' Union, a social work student, member of the Prevention of Student Suicide Committee)
  - Suen is the only youth member in the Prevention of Student Suicide Committee. She suggested that Hong Kong's exam-oriented education placed undue pressure on both teachers and students. This leads to reduced time for teachers to notice, let alone take care of students' mental well-being during the meetings. Her views were, however, absent in the Final report, stating that there is no substantial direct link between student suicides and the education system. She questioned whether the government is genuine in including young voices and participation on advisory bodies, and accused the pro-establishment forces of the committee for disregarding her views.

== Suggestions ==
In the final report, the Prevention of Student Suicide Committee divided their recommendations into universal, selective and indicated support. Furthermore, the 19 suggestions are divided into areas of improvement, as follows: student support, families, traditional and social media, multiple articulation pathways, and systematic. The 19 suggestions are:

1. Promote mental well-being and health
2. Facilitate students' school adjustment
3. Enhance family life and parent education
4. Foster promotional use of social media
5. Advocate responsible media reporting
6. Enhance publicity of multiple pathways
7. Facilitate career exploration
8. Review relevant domains in the educational system, duly support and address the development and diverse needs of the students and young people
9. Conduct gatekeeper training for early identification and intervention
10. Develop screening tools and guidelines for school to identify at-risk students
11. Enhance referral mechanism to mental health services
12. Provide gatekeeper training for parents
13. Arrange counselling and support services for needy parents
14. Implement gate keeping on social media
15. Strengthen cyber-based outreaching services
16. Continue developing online screening tools and conducting ongoing research
17. Establish school-based multi-disciplinary platforms
18. Enhance accessibility of mental health services
19. Publicise outreach services for needy families.

In November 2016, the Hong Kong Professional Teachers' Union made the following suggestions: (1) Alleviation of teachers' pressure e.g. increasing the quota of regular teachers and increase the teacher-student ratio per class; (2) Enhancing support from social workers (e.g. ensuring there is at least one social worker and one counsellor in each school); (3) Enhancing school-based educational psychology service (Chinese: 校本教育心理服務); (4) Reform of education system, e.g. abolish Territory-wide System Assessment.

In 2017, the Civil Alliance for Student Suicide Prevention publicised a survey that indicated public support for capping the number of hours spent studying each day to 7 hours. Lai Pak-yin, the spokesperson from the Civil Alliance for Student Suicide Prevention, argues that excessive studying can have a harmful effect on family relationships. Therefore, he suggested that the Educational Bureau should issue guidelines to help decrease the number of hours spent studying each day.

== Controversy ==
=== Prevention of Student Suicides Page ===
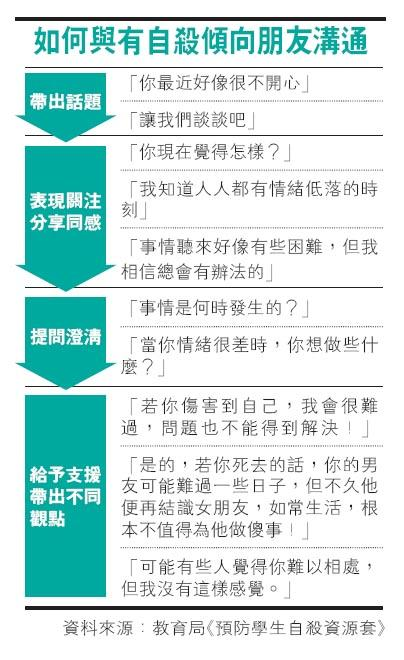
"The Package on Prevention of Student Suicide (2010)" P.29

In April 2017, the Education Bureau set up the "Prevention of Student Suicides" page. They uploaded different resources and tips on how to identify and manage students with suicidal tendencies. The Bureau's website had a document titled "The Package on Prevention of Student Suicide (2010)". It was in Chinese. One of the examples suggested in the document was a way to communicate with friends who have suicidal tendencies. This example attracted huge public backlash – "If you die, your boyfriend may be sad for a few days, but he will soon find a new girlfriend and live normally. It is not worth doing such a silly thing for him!".

Various educators and social workers commented that the controversial example can be very dangerous for people with suicidal thoughts. According to Shiu Ka-chun, the example provided was dismissive and could encourage pessimistic ideas further adding to the suicidal thoughts.

=== Suicide of Choi Yuk-lin's son ===
On 7 September 2017, the Under-secretary for Education Christine Choi Yuk-lin's 25-year-old son, Poon Hong-yan, jumped to his death from the family's flat on the 41st floor at Sorrento. It was revealed that he suffered from depression due to serious injuries from a triathlon accident. Various officials, such as the Chief Executive Carrie Lam and Secretary for Education Kevin Yeung, expressed their condolences to Choi and her family.

As Choi Yuk-lin is a member of the Prevention of Student Suicide Committee, some critics linked the incident with student suicide problem. Choi was attacked and criticized for failing to consider her adolescent sons concerns and perspectives. Suen Hiu-nam, head of HKU's student union, further criticized officials for only sending their condolences to Choi's son, and ignoring other students who had committed suicide.

On the same day, signs bearing the slogan "Congratulations Choi Yuk-lin's son on going west" appeared on the Education University of Hong Kong Democracy Wall, on top of banners supporting freedom of expression and Hong Kong independence. The university later issued a statement condemning the signs and apologising for any hurt those signs may have caused.
