= The Samaritan Befrienders Hong Kong =

Hong Kong Counseling Organization

- Company type: Non-government organisation
- Genre: Voluntary agency
- Founded: July 1960; 65 years ago (as Suicide Prevention Society); October 1963; 62 years ago (as The Samaritan Befrienders Hong Kong)
- Headquarters: Hong Kong
- Area served: Hong Kong
- Key people: Volunteers
- Revenue: Non-profit making
- Operating income: Funding
- Website: www.sbhk.org.hk

SBHK Choi Hung Center

SBHK Pak Tin Center

The Samaritan Befrienders Hong Kong (SBHK) (Chinese: 香港撒瑪利亞防止自殺會) is a non-government organisation. It is a local voluntary agency which provides counselling services to people with suicidal tendencies or behaviour. This organisation was the first of its kind in Asia.

There are three centres under The Samaritan Befrienders Hong Kong: the 24-hour Hotline Centre (TOUCH), the Life Education Center (GROW), and the Suicide Crisis Intervention Center (ALIVE). They aim at providing personal consultation, group therapy and community education.

Another work of SBHK is to provide suicide-related statistics to the public for them to be informed. It releases the number of calls received, the range of ages of help seekers, the distribution of the callers' districts, the common problems of people who have committed or attempted to commit suicide, and other information.

== Suicide rate in Hong Kong (1981–2005) ==
According to the figures of World Health Organization, the suicide rate of Hong Kong has been increasing in the recent years. Between 1981 and 2001, the Hong Kong annual suicide rate rose from 9.6 to 15 per 100,000 people. It even reached a high record in 2002 when 16.4 of every 100,000 people chose to commit suicide. This exceeded the global average of 14.5 suicides per 100,000. The relatively high suicide rate in 2002 may be due to that year's economic depression. However, SBHK chairman Wong Yao-wing articulated that the problem lies in whether there is enough support for the people in need of help.

Nevertheless, the suicide rate dropped to the global average in the past few years. There were about 1053 and 960 people committing suicide in 2004 and 2005 respectively which brought the suicide rate down from a peak of 18.6 per 100,000 people in 2003 to 14. Such a relatively dramatic decline could be attributed to greater awareness of suicide problems. The director of the center for Suicide Research and Prevention, Dr. Yip Siu-fai believed that there was a need to extend the support services available to those who are contemplating suicide. Dr. Yip also stated that the decrease of suicide rate had not been seen in Hong Kong before, which shows that suicide is preventable and people can help to improve the situation. He suggested that, to help those with potentially suicide-triggering illness, the government should add suicide prevention in the public issue of health policy.

The hotline centre of SBHK revealed that there were 14,688 help-seeking calls in 2005, which was 10.81% more than in 2004. Correspondingly, the suicide rate dropped by 18.5% from 2004 to 2005. It implies that Hong Kong people are becoming more willing to share their problems. Thus, the achievement of SBHK is generally recognised by the public.

== Background ==
The Samaritan Befrienders Hong Kong is named after the Good Samaritan, who is a biblical character who was generous and benevolent to help people in difficulty described in the Bible. To set the Good Samaritan as a model, therefore SBHK borrowed the symbolic meaning of Good Samaritan as its organizational name.

Although SBHK adopts the word from the Christian Bible as their name, according to their reports, it is a non-religious organisation and doesn't inculcate any religious stance to help seekers.

The SBHK is a member of the Samaritan's international network, Befrienders Worldwide

== Logo ==
The SBHK logo was a modified logo, which was adopted in 1981. In the logo, there are two people standing face to face and holding each other's hands. Between them, the name of SBHK forms a question mark. This is a metaphor of helping, encouraging, and loving each other as SBHK's stated goal.

The previous logo, which had been in use for twenty years till 1981, looks like a life buoy surrounding a seven-storied tower representing the Chinese idiom that "saving a life is worth more than building a tower of seven storeys".(救人一命勝造七級 浮圖)

== History ==
In July 1960, SBHK was established under the name "Suicide Prevention Society", which was a local agency run by volunteer workers. The service was the first of its kind in Asia.

In October 1963, SBHK was registered as a society in Hong Kong and changed its name to "The Samaritan Befrienders Hong Kong".

In 1964, there was a significant increase in suicide rate among secondary 5 students because of their setback in the Hong Kong Certificate of Education Examination, which greatly alarmed the public. Thus, in the next year, SBHK started a Summer Hotline Service for the Form 5 graduates in Hong Kong, and the service has been running since then.

In the 1970s, SBHK offered its services by two units: one operated in Cantonese, the other in English. However, the latter was dissolved in 1982 and developed into a new organisation called "The Samaritans" which provided 24-hour multilingual hotline service of suicide prevention.

In 1994, SBHK was incorporated as a limited company.

== Recent developments ==
Besides the Hotline service, two centres were established to enable SBHK to reach other service areas and provide a more comprehensive suicide prevention service for the community. A Life Education Center and a Suicidal Crisis Intervention Center were established in 2002. With the support of Mrs. Carrie Lam, JP, Director of Social Welfare and the financial support from both The Hong Kong Jockey Club and the Lotteries Fund, these two centres have been in operation since April 2002. The two new centres together with the existing Hotline Center, though having unique service nature and different objectives, share the common spirit and mission of SBHK.

== Services ==
=== Hotline Center ===
Telephone Booth

Another name of the Hotline Center is "TOUCH" (生機處處), which stands for "Contact", "Understanding" and "Sensitivity".

SBHK's 24-hour Hotline Centre, which has served Hong Kong for almost 40 years, mainly provides immediate emotional support to people who are suffering from depression or have suicidal tendency. The centre has 4 telephone lines (telephone booths) run by nearly 200 volunteers on shift. Usually there are 2 to 3 volunteers on duty and 10 calls can be received at one time. Besides, the Hotline Centre also concentrates on the promotion of suicide prevention in the community.

The details of the conversations between SBHK's volunteers and callers are kept confidential, including the brief content of the conversation and the past telephone records, however, valuable and special cases might be shared within SBHK's volunteers for case studying.

=== Life Education Center ===
Meeting room

Another name of Life Education Center is "GROW" (熱愛生命), which stands for growth by means of Life Education. The life education center mainly promotes suicide prevention by community services, seminars and public reports, and also offers resources to public for researches and information of international suicide prevention conferences.

=== Suicide Crisis Intervention Center ===
ALIVE (跨越明天) is another name of Suicide Crisis Intervention Centre (SCIC), which provides crisis intervention and intensive counselling service to those who are in emergency situations and at moderate or high suicide risk.

== Other works and programmes ==
Caring Fund was set up in 1994 to support the project aiming at promoting the importance of active listening to the people around. Part of the Caring Fund is spent on developing community education and fund raising.

SBHK also provided Education Programme and Courses and Joint programmes for the purpose of educating the public.

== Working method ==
The SBHK operates a 24-hour hotline, provides crisis intervention, life education and interview services, and answers mails from help seekers.

The telephone operators of the 24-hour Hotline service are willing to listen to help seekers' problems and understand how they feel. It provides an Interview Service. Help seekers could make appointment for the personal interview or write to the SBHK via letter or e-mail.

Besides, some social workers of the SBHK hold talks with parents, teachers, nurses and government officials. Topics mainly focus on emotional problems, pressure, depression and suicide; how to assess emotional changes, how to deal with emotional persecution and how to treasure life .

Three Stages of Service:

- First stage: Prevention. Its aim is to convey the idea of "invaluable life" to people who have a little tendency of suicide. This will prevent them from developing suicidal behaviour.
- Second stage: Intervention. SBHK's volunteers or employed social workers will be ready to provide counselling service to people with suicidal behaviour.
- Third stage: Postvention. People with unsuccessful suicidal behaviour will be tracked by experts who are experienced in this area.

This system is the commonly used method, although the center can provide targeted suicide prevention to different groups of people.

== Volunteers ==
Samaritan volunteers come from different social classes, including teachers, students, housewives and retired people. Volunteers are selected under the screening of "Volunteer Selection" section. Those who pass the screening section will take a one-year training course before they become a volunteer of SBHK.

Besides providing hotline service, volunteers also work to arouse the social awareness of the issue about depression and suicide. Money is needed for all these activities. Therefore, the other duty of volunteers is to raise funds to maintain SBHK services.

=== Volunteer information ===
(Statistics at the end of 2004)

- The organisation had a total of 218 hotline volunteers – 30% male and 70% female
- All the volunteers were over 20 years old
- The majority (40%) were in the age range of 35 and 44 years old
- 62.4% of the total had received a tertiary or university education
- 19.7% came from the white collar
- 2.8% came from the social service sector
- 11.9% came from the medical field and education sector

== Donation ==
The Community Chest of Hong Kong, The Hong Kong Jockey Club, and Social Welfare funding are the main sources of funds for the Hotline Center (TOUCH), Life Education Center (GROW) and Suicide Crisis Intervention Center (ALIVE). Commercial organisations like PCCW and MTR Corporation also help to donate to the SBHK.

== Publications ==
SBHK library

The publications of SBHK include their annual reports, articles, books and promotional videos, most of which are stored in SBHK's library.

- to see more of SBHK's Annual reports
- to see more of SBHK's articles
- to see more of SBHK's books
- to see more of SBHK's promotional videos

== Performance ==
According to SBHK's 2004 Annual Report, there were 14,315 calls received during 2004. Among them, 9,439 (66%) calls were from the real help seekers, who are emotionally depressed callers. The remaining 4,876 (34%) were "fake" calls, which are enquiry calls, frivolous calls and silent calls. As compared to the figures of 1994, there was a rise of 8,728 calls received. The rate of "real" calls enjoyed an increase of 9% as well.

== Criticism ==
=== High rate of missed calls ===
According to Yahoo News (2006), during the HKCEE result release period, which is also a peak time of teenagers' suicide, Ming Pao reporter found that there were 10 missed calls within 2 hours and the calls were not even transferred to a message box.

SBHK announced that during the peak time, Hotline Centre might be overloaded due to the limitation of resources and space, but they promised there would be an increase in the number of Hotline Volunteers accordingly to improve the current situation.

On the other hand, according to the interview on 11 February 2006, Mr. Kan, the Vice-chairman of SBHK, pointed out that to avoid overlapping the resources, the number of volunteers would not be increased during the HKCEE period. As SBHK's past records noted, most of the calls made by Form 5 graduates were asking information rather than really seeking emotional support. Since there already exist some other services providing informative guidance to Form 5 graduates, like Hok Yau Club (學友社), 1878668 (人間互助社聯熱線), etc., SBHK indicated that they would keep the number of Hotline Center volunteers during HKCEE as usual.

=== Phone number mistake ===
There was another news report in Apple Daily on 1 July 2006 that a help seeker, Mr. So, phoned the hotline center and asked for an appointment with a social worker. The hotline volunteer jotted down the ID and phone number of Mr. So and told him to wait for the call back in seconds, but it turned out that Mr. So had been waiting for up to 9 hours. The reason of the late call as claimed was the mistaken phone number.

SBHK stated that the hotline volunteer transferred Mr. So's case to the Suicide Crisis Intervention Centre shortly after his call and phoned him twice, but Mr So did not answer the phone. After leaving a message and making five phone calls, the social worker still could not get through to Mr. So until someone answered the call and said that he had dialed the wrong number. The centre then checked the number and found that they had mistaken the '3' for '5'. At last, the correct phone call was made at 8:37 p.m.

SBHK apologised for the mistake and promised to check the information more carefully in the future.

=== Deficiency of service ===
According to another news report of Ming Pao on 14 May 2004, a help seeker tried several times to call the SBHK hotline, but there was no one receiving his call. The help seeker also blamed that there was no service for him to leave a message, which made him feel more depressed.

SBHK admits that they have not yet introduced a message recording service. However, as there are not enough volunteers working at late night hours, even if there is a message recording service, workers may not be able to phone back immediately during these periods.

== See also ==
- Samaritans (charity)
- Suicide
- Suicide prevention

== References and related articles ==
- Statistics of suicide case from SBHK in HK 2006 – 9 July 2006, South China Morning Post
- 放榜在即求助高峰 自殺熱線無人接聽 – 4 August 2006, Yahoo News
- 17歲中三女生跳樓亡 3日第二宗學生自殺 – 9 September 2006, Yahoo News
- 防自殺熱線深夜無人聽求助者心灰 學者﹕打擊鬥志 – 14 May 2004, MingPao Daily News
- Statics of suicide case being handled in phones in HK in 2005
