= Forde Inquiry =

1999 report on child abuse presented to the government of Queensland, Australia

The Forde Inquiry (1998–1999), or formally the Commission of Inquiry into Abuse of Children in Queensland Institutions, was a special inquiry into child abuse in the state of Queensland, Australia, presided over by Leneen Forde AC, a former governor of Queensland. Assisting Ms Forde were Dr Jane Thomason and Mr Hans Heilperm.

The inquiry covered 159 institutions from 1911 to 1999 and found abuse had occurred and made 42 recommendations relating to contemporary child protection practices, youth justice and redress of past abuse. The inquiry resulted in reconciliation initiatives including apologies, commemorative memorials and events, establishment and delivery of the Queensland Government Redress Scheme, establishment of the Forde Foundation Trust Fund, and establishment of community-based support services.

== Legislative background ==
The Commission of Inquiry was established on 13 August 1998 by the Queensland Government's Minister for Families, Youth and Community Care, Anna Bligh, pursuant to the Commissions of Inquiry Act 1950 (QLD) to examine whether there had been any abuse, mistreatment or neglect of children in Queensland institutions. The commission inquired into and reported in relation to any government or non-government institutions or detention centres established or licensed under the State Children Act 1911 (QLD), Children’s Services Act 1965 (QLD), or the Juvenile Justice Act 1992 (QLD). The inquiry specifically investigated whether any unsafe, improper or unlawful care or treatment of children occurred and whether any breach of any relevant statutory obligation under the above Acts has occurred during the course of the care, protection and detention of children.

== Procedures and methods ==
During the period from August 1998 through May 1999, the commission conducted intensive inquiries into the current and past administration of various orphanages, reformatories, and detention centres for wayward children maintained in Queensland. A sizeable number of witnesses were deposed under oath to testify before the commission. Most of these deponents had spent part of their childhood or adolescence in one or more of Queensland's youth institutions. Some of these witnesses chose to be identified by name in the final inquiry, but many requested anonymity. The commission solicited testimony from indigenous Australian individuals as well as from those of non–indigenous descent. As most of the deponents were testifying in regard to events which they had experienced or witnessed during their childhood or adolescence, in some cases they were testifying about events that had occurred as much as fifty years prior to the inquiry.

Some of the commission's findings remained sealed after publication of the report, as these referred to matters that were still under litigation or criminal prosecution as of May 1999.

== Findings ==
In handing the 380–page report to the Minister in May 1999, the commissioners noted that:

- Many of the children in Australian orphanages were not orphans, but were in fact "child migrants" who were expatriated from postwar Britain to serve the double purpose of easing food shortages in Britain and building up a population base of young white citizens in Australia. Some of these were children whose parents simply did not want them; others were children who had been separated from their parents during World War II due to evacuation or bombings. Although the "child migrant" scheme was originally implemented to ease postwar conditions, the British government continued expatriating children to Australia until 1966.
- Many boys were placed in criminal institutions (reformatories, detention centres and work farms) not because they had committed any crime, but merely because they had turned 14 and were therefore too old to remain in orphanages.
- Girls who became sexually active in their teen years were routinely placed in reformatories on the grounds that they were in "moral danger"; allegedly they were no longer in danger when they were locked into reformatories.
- Children and adolescents were routinely used for slave labour, and were subjected to physical and sexual abuse by the warders and matrons of the institutions in which they were housed. Many of these institutions were administered by one or another Christian church – Anglican, Baptist, Catholic, Methodist or Protestant – so the authority figures administering the abuse were frequently priests and occasionally nuns.
- Most of the children were given no schooling, no instruction in useful trades, and no opportunities for recreation. Although some of the orphanages possessed playgrounds and toys, these were maintained only as display for visitors and inspectors.
- Suicide was rampant among the youthful inmates, to the extent that several of these institutions were designed and built in a manner that eliminated "hanging points"; i.e., points which could support a noose containing the weight of a child bent on suicide.
- Children were routinely given severe punishment for extremely minor infractions. One example cited in the report was the sanctioned policy of inflicting physical torture upon left-handed children, in order "to get the Devil out of them", the Devil being presumed to be left-handed.

== Recommendations and the Government's response ==
The Inquiry Commission issued 42 separate recommendations for changes in government policy, in addition to implementing funding and staff to ensure that these changes were made. A few months after the original inquiry, the Queensland Government issued a progress report. During September 2011, the Government issued a final report responding to all the 42 recommendations. Follow-up reports have verified that substantial progress has been made towards righting decades of incompetence, cruelty and malfeasance.

After the commission handed its report to the Government, several youth institutions were decommissioned and closed, and several administrators were prosecuted for crimes against their young charges. Due to the decades that had elapsed since the time of the worst offences, many of the guilty parties had died in the interim.

== See also ==
- Royal Commission into Institutional Responses to Child Sexual Abuse
- Catholic sexual abuse cases in Australia
- Forgotten Australians
- BoysTown – an investigated institution
