= BoysTown (Beaudesert) =

Child-welfare institution in Beaudesert, Queensland, Australia

Coordinates: 28.0006°S 152.9918°E

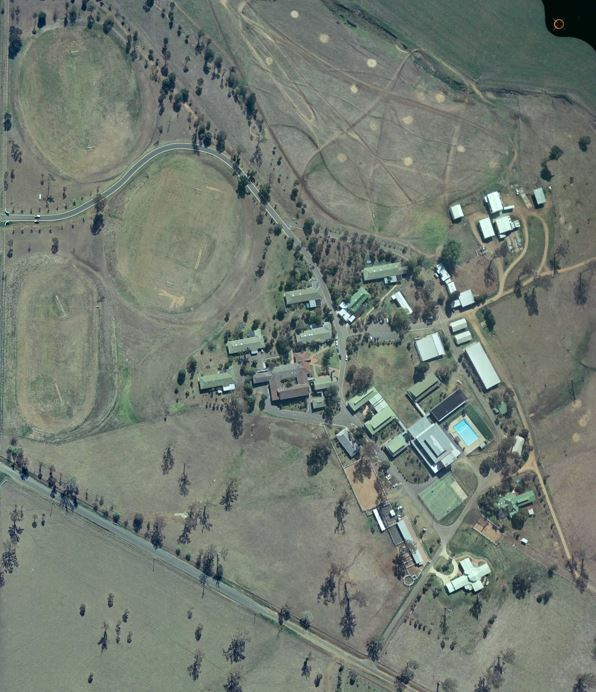
Aerial view of the BoysTown site, 1993

BoysTown was a child welfare school and institution located in Beaudesert, Queensland, Australia. It was open from 1961 until 2001, and operated by the De La Salle Brothers, a Catholic organisation. There were allegations, later proved, of physical and sexual child abuse, reported in 2020 as the largest case at a single institution in Australia's history. Two former BoysTown staff were convicted of child sex offences committed at the institution, and the De La Salle Brothers paid over A$27 million in compensation to 219 victims of abuse. Following the closure of the institution, BoysTown continued to operate as a charity, and rebranded as yourtown in 2016.

== History ==
BoysTown was a Lasallian educational institution, founded by St. Mary’s parish priest Monsignor Owen Steele, and operated by the De La Salle Brothers, a Catholic organisation. It was lauded upon opening for its goal of helping and schooling disadvantaged youth. The institution housed both orphans and other wards, and boys who had been referred to them following criminal activity. It was reportedly the only place in Queensland in the 1970s where a ward could complete Year 8, 9 and 10. BoysTown, however, was best known at the time for operating charity gambling, in the form of selling lottery tickets where the winning prize was a house. BoysTown also founded the Kids Helpline in 1991.

By 1978 government child welfare officers had raised concerns about severe beatings at the institutions from staff, and allegations of boys being forced to fight each other in boxing matches until the director told them to stop. Staff at BoysTown also regularly gave children tobacco. A report on BoysTown that year criticised the organisation for its "preoccupation with conformity", the general reluctance of staff to address the social and emotional needs of the children, and for considering parental contact to be a privilege that could be denied as a form of punishment. The report went on to say staff had a reluctance to acknowledge any benefit in promoting a child's relationship with their family, and stated BoysTown provided inadequate preparation for discharge and community integration for children. Children who complained about abuse at the time were either ignored or beaten as punishment.

The first allegations of sexual abuse were made in 1997, and the Forde Inquiry, initiated the following year, concluded that BoysTown was still openly violating Queensland’s non-binding standards against violent punishment in licensed care facilities. The Forde Inquiry heard complaints of excessive corporal punishment, including children being beaten by the BoysTown director with a strap and jockey whips in the early 1970s, and that despite the introduction of a new director in 1976, conditions at the institution did not improve significantly.

The BoysTown institution was closed in 2001, though the charity continued to operate under that name. BoysTown was still earning millions of dollars per year in 2001 through the sale of lottery tickets.

== Abuse, lawsuits and convictions ==
[Staff] bashed us. No one ever believed us. ... I was bashed regularly. If you had a little bit of spirit they tried to break you. The place was run like a prison. The only things missing were the bars.

— Former BoysTown resident Joe Kilroy

Complaints against BoysTown dramatically increased in 2012, after a feature on 60 Minutes showed many former residents making allegations of physical and sexual abuse that had occurred at the institution. At the time, 35 former residents were litigating BoysTown for abuse, in what was described by 60 Minutes as "one of the largest cases of its type in Australian legal history". Former residents spoke on the program of being physically assaulted and raped, and seventeen stated they were strip searched at BoysTown. However, former director of BoysTown Brother Paul Smith accused former resident Terry McDaniel on the program of having false memories for stating he was strip searched, saying no such behaviour had ever occurred at the institution. Days before the program aired, Ambrose Payne, the leader of the De La Salle order in Australia, circulated an email to staff describing the allegations as "lacking foundation".

The catalyst for the episode itself was a chance meeting between McDaniel and two other former residents, who shared similar stories with each other, after previously thinking they had all been the only victims of sexual assault. Many victims came forward after the show's airing, with over 180 litigating against BoysTown by the following year, and over 350 by 2019. Following the episode, the Queensland Police Service launched Operation Kilo Lariat to investigate claims of abuse. Former rugby league footballer Joe Kilroy spent three years at BoysTown, where he was subjected to physical abuse; in 2013 he was still undergoing counselling to deal with trauma he experienced there. He was also involved in the lawsuits against BoysTown.

Ninety-nine people who worked at BoysTown were accused of sexually abusing children, though only two were convicted. In 2017, Brother Francis Brophy was convicted of 38 charges relating to sexually abusing children at BoysTown between 1978 and 1983. He was sentenced to eight years in prison. Brophy abused one boy for years in a shed while purporting to be giving private guitar lessons. Sentencing Judge William Everson described Brophy as a "cowardly, evil paedophile", and BoysTown as a "gulag right in our midst". Stephen Anthony Gray, a former teacher at the school, was sentenced to six years' imprisonment in 2018 for sexually abusing four boys aged between 12 and 15 in the 1980s. The child abuse uncovered at BoysTown was reported in 2020 as the largest case at a single institution in Australia's history.

The BoysTown charity changed its name to yourtown in 2016. It was still running lottery sales, and operated a domestic violence refuge in Brisbane and a homeless refuge in Sydney. Yourtown denied the change was an attempt to distance themselves from the abuse, but rather to reflect that the charity now also worked with girls and women. Both yourtown and the De La Salle Brothers state they are separate entities, though Ambrose Payne is the chair of the yourtown board, and other De La Salle Brothers are still employed to work at yourtown, which is owned by the Trustees of the De La Salle Brothers. By 2017, the trustees for the De La Salle Brothers had paid almost $27 million in compensation for 219 credible claims of abuse, representing the highest figure against a single church-run institution in Australia. As of 2019, the De La Salle Brothers were still denying responsibility for abuse at BoysTown on the grounds children housed there were the responsibility of the Queensland Government.
