= Volunteer Emotional Support Helplines =

Volunteer Emotional Support Helplines (VESH) is an international network of telephone counseling services. It was formed by the three largest international services for emotional support – Befrienders/Samaritans, IFOTES & Lifeline – to develop a more effective and robust international interface.

VESH represents 1200 member centres in 61 countries. Their goal is to ensure maximum access to effective services for people in distress. They agreed to:

- encourage the development of new services in areas of need
- promote best practice
- increase information sharing between member associations and externally
- represent members’ experiences internationally
- promote communications skills which contribute to emotional health.

Together, the VESH partners have around 1,200 member centres in 61 countries. They have outlined a commitment to information sharing and joint activities. Part of this includes annual meetings and quarterly telephone conferences to plan and implement collaborative projects.

At the International Association for Suicide Prevention (IASP) Congress in Ireland in 2007, VESH members

1. were asked to consider leading the re-establishment of an IASP Task Force on Best Practice in Helplines.
2. agreed to provide one person to be on the Scientific Committee planning the content of the 2009 IASP International Congress.
3. agreed to produce two draft booklets along the lines of ‘Setting up a New Emotional Support Service’, and ‘Best Practice Guidelines’ (following a request from WHO)

== History ==
In 2002 IFOTES, LifeLine International and Befrienders International (and later adopted by Befrienders Worldwide) signed a Memorandum of Understanding - with a view to maximising joint impact in terms of emotional support services.

Since then a number of joint initiatives have been undertaken including joint platforms at international conferences of the International Association for Suicide Prevention and joint involvement in planning for the suicide themed World Mental Health Day 2006, a European Single Number project (116 123) and European Green Paper on Mental Health.

== Member Organizations ==
VESH members each represent counselling services in multiple countries.

=== Befrienders Worldwide ===
Befrienders Worldwide is now run by Samaritans, who took on the work of Befrienders International in 2003. They have members worldwide.

=== IFOTES - International Federation of Telephone Emergency Services ===
Founded in 1967, IFOTES brings together National Associations of Telephone Emergency Services, mainly from Western Europe, along with Israel and some Eastern European countries

=== Lifeline International ===
Lifeline International is run by Lifeline Australia. Member organisations are from countries in the Asian & Pacific Islands region, some African nations, and Canada and the USA.

== Future plans ==
Members recognize the enormous common ground between them and feel there would be great advantage in having an international network within 5–10 years, to which all members would belong. This would be something along the lines of an ‘International Network of Emotional Support Services’.

This would be to both provide a common platform, as well as an information exchange hub taking advantage of the enormous diversity of the combined members experiences - both geographically and in terms of innovative responses in providing emotional support. They believe that a combined network can build on and take advantage of member diversity, whilst also ensuring members feel connected to each other and feel an identity with such a network.

=== Taking collaboration to a new level ===
Each VESH member already values their activities, and the role they've played in influencing best practice and raising the profile of the combined networks. They want to take this collaboration to a new level, to enable them to respond effectively to new opportunities and responsibilities.

Members have limited resources, and to have most influence and impact at a national, regional and international level want to improve links between all members, at all these levels. This could, for instance, include joint regional workshops and other activities; or to better take advantage of the materials available in various languages.

1. members work in an increasingly mobile and global society, with rapidly developing technologies. They want to improve their capacity to respond to these trends, and ensure effective cross-border activities.
2. members want to engage with such international bodies as the World Health Organization, the International Association for Suicide Prevention and the World Federation for Mental Health. They seek to take up crucial opportunities that have already been presented to represent and advocate, using the extensive experiences of their combined membership
3. VESH seeks to explore opportunities with Child Helpline International (CHI, formed in 2003). VESH members recognise that they have many issues in common with CHI, and also that there could be further opportunities for joint working with a 'whole life' approach.
