= Kely Support Group =

Hong Kong youth organization

KELY Support Group
- Formation: 1991
- Type: Non-governmental organisation
- Headquarters: Hong Kong
- Location: Hong Kong, China
- Website: www.kely.org

KELY Support Group (commonly known as KELY; simplified Chinese: 启励扶青会; traditional Chinese: 啟勵扶青會) is a non-governmental bilingual organisation in Hong Kong which aims to provide support to youth between the ages of 14 and 24. Its programmes and services focus on prevention and intervention of alcoholism and other drug abuse, and are designed to tackle what the group regards as the common reasons for abuse such as boredom, peer pressure, lack of self-awareness, low self-esteem, poverty, unemployment and discrimination.

== History ==
KELY was founded in 1991 by Samantha Martin, the daughter of Hong Kong business executives, who was overcoming her addiction to drugs such as alcohol. While in recovery she told her story of drug abuse to her peers. Having attended school in the US, upon Martin's return to Hong Kong, she found what she believe to be an abundance of drugs in the Hong Kong school system. She eventually set up an informal self-help group which offered support to young individuals with addiction problems. Support was established to form an organisation under the acronym KELY, which stands for "Kids Everywhere Like You". Since 1991, KELY Support Group has provided drug education and counselling support in schools in Hong Kong following the model of peer support, leadership development and mentorship.

Mentorship involves adult volunteers from the local community to share their knowledge and expertise with KELY's youth participants. KELY uses a 'bottom-up' mentorship approach as youth and adults develop shared goals and work together as a team in various programmes.

== Programmes and services ==
KELY focuses on youth from Chinese speaking, ethnic minority and English speaking communities, who come from low socio-economic backgrounds, have low self-esteem, may be struggling with alcohol and other drug abuse, and do not receive adequate support services. The organisation engages young people in the planning, implementation and monitoring of KELY's programmes and services, in an effort to make them more relevant to their participants' needs. Programmes and services focus on alcohol prevention and other drug prevention and intervention and are specially designed to tackle the root causes of abuse, including boredom, peer pressure, lack of self-awareness, low self-esteem, poverty, unemployment, and discrimination.

Current programming includes:

=== Prevention and harm reduction ===
KELY's workshops employ a harm reduction approach on alcohol and other drug-related topics. These workshops provide resources to participants from various schools and organisations. As an NGO, it embodies a "bottom-up" approach towards drug prevention.

KELY aims to educate and inform vulnerable young people around drug abuse including alcoholism, and to build their capacity, resilience, and life skills to help them reach their potential. This includes: school-based education on drugs such as alcohol, long-term capacity building and skills training programmes, and targeted harm reduction outreach.

==== School-based alcohol and other drug education ====
Life skills education workshops: KELY's life skills education workshops, an alcohol-and-other-drugs education programme funded by Narcotics Division, tackle issues associated with alcoholism and other drug abuse for at-risk ethnic minority and non-Chinese youth. Their workshops educates young people on topics such as self-esteem, peer influence, drug-taking risks and refusal skills. In 2014, they reached 13,146 young people in Hong Kong through workshops and organising visits to the Hong Kong Jockey Club Drug Info Centre.

Keeping it R.E.A.L. Keeping it R.E.A.L. (Refuse, Explain, Avoid, Leave) is an evidence-based training programme that educates young people about the risks of drugs, as well as recognising the influence of peers at schools and in their community. In this programme, participants learn about drugs and are given the opportunity to recognise and develop their own strengths to become community leaders. In 2014, they continued with the 4th cycle of this programme, which was offered to 30 ethnic minority youth. They introduced art therapy as a way to enable young people to express and explore some of the causes and consequences of drug use.

It Begins With One Story It Begins With One Story aims to develop a safe and positive platform for parents and youth through needs assessment, experiential learning and intensive training on drug abuse for youth and mentors. They are encouraged to engage in constructive dialogue and create strategies to tackle drug issues. Throughout the programme, participants designed several healthy promotion resources on drug abuse targeted to their own cultures and communities in Hong Kong. Participants also developed poster campaigns that encouraged their peers to make informed life choices. The posters were distributed to 20 non-Chinese speaking schools and communities across Hong Kong. "It Begins With One Story: Resources For A Drug Free Hong Kong," a booklet designed and developed by these participants, was publicly launched in July 2014 to help youth and their parents kick-start conversations about drugs such as alcohol.

==== Long-term capacity building and life skills training ====
Defeat Failure, Get Positive! Defeat Failure, Get Positive! is one of KELY's signature life skills training programmes. Using stress management circus arts and performance training, the programme targets vulnerable youth in Chinese-medium schools across Hong Kong to develop their resiliency, coping skills and build confidence to deal with challenging issues in life. In 2014, KELY helped over 7,700 students with this programme.

Mentoring Ethnic Minority Youths For Community Participation and Integration: Realizing Inner Strengths, Empowered! The mentorship programme provides the opportunity for ethnic minority youth to learn technical, leadership, community development, and essential life skills, improving to access greater social and economic opportunities. Topics include diversity and inclusion, the impact of ethnic minority communities in Hong Kong and community leadership skills.

Seeing The Possibilities Seeing The Possibilities aimed to help disadvantaged youth overcome obstacles and aspire to greater life goals, through fashion and event management Seeing The Possibilities has helped 70 local Chinese and ethnic minority youth in 2014 to develop career goals, practical skills, and capacity while offering alternatives to drugs such as alcohol. One of KELY's signature mentorship programmes, Seeing The Possibilities has received support from the members of City Indian Network, Bonham Strand, Wells Fargo Bank, Credit Suisse, and other corporate groups and private businesses. In 2014, they ran two cycles of this programme-one for Chinese-speaking and one for ethnic minority youth-which ended with two fashion shows in May and December respectively.

==== Harm reduction and outreach ====
Save Our Sevens Save Our Sevens (also known as SOSKELY) is KELY's annual responsible drinking campaign at the Hong Kong Sevens. Supported by the Hong Kong Rugby Football Union, the outreach campaign focuses on alcohol-related harm through giving water to young people who may be intoxicated, and aims to provide a safe place for young people at the sporting event.

Clockenflap Hong Kong's Music and Arts Festival In 2014, KELY continued a similar type of responsible drinking campaign to Clockenflap, an outdoor music and art festival in Hong Kong. The "Stay Hydrated" campaign ran throughout the weekend of 29 November to 1 December 2014, reaching out to approximately 2,115 young people. KELY staff and volunteers provided emotional support, alcohol-free chill-out zone and a safe space for young people under the influence.

=== Advocacy ===
International Day Against Drug Abuse and Illicit Trafficking 26 June 2014 marked KELY's annual public outreach campaign to advocate for United Nations' International Day Against Drug Abuse and Illicit Trafficking. KELY and volunteers engaged with over 1,164 people in Tsueng Kwan O's Sheung Tak Plaza to raise awareness of international efforts to combat drug issues, sharing updated drug trends in Hong Kong and inviting the public to contribute to a large art installation. With the message "Your Support Changes Lives," the campaign encouraged the audience to learn about issues surrounding young drug abuse and to become more proactive in providing support to at-risk youth.

International Youth Day In support of the United Nations and the global advocacy to end mental health stigma, KELY held an Instagram campaign to participate in International Youth Day on 12 August 2014. With the theme "Mental Health Matters," the campaign asked for the public to submit supportive messages to young people dealing with mental health issues via social media platforms. Spanning over 2 weeks, the campaign received 18 public Instagram submissions and gained 237 interactions on Instagram and 107 Twitter engagements from Hong Kong, Australia, United Nations and Kenya.

=== Intervention ===
Growing Up With KELY/Talk2Me Aiming to bridge the gap in mental health services for young people, Growing Up With KELY consists of a three-pronged approach: preventative to boost protective factors and reduce high-risk behaviour; using psychometric assessment tools for early identification and rapid response for at-risk youth; and providing interventions, support, education and opportunities to foster positive coping skills, competence and resilience. In 2014, Growing Up With KELY was facilitated across 6 secondary schools in Hong Kong, helping a total of 2,650 young people address psychosocial issues, build positive coping skills and foster peer support networks. 147 in-depth risk assessments were conducted by KELY's clinical psychology and counselling team, where 12 youth who presented high risk of suicide were referred for psychiatric evaluation, as well as follow-up counselling and monitoring.

Talk2Me IM In response to the rapidly changing social and technological advancements, KELY constantly re-evaluated their resources and tools to understand and engage with youth, to provide support for them. In November 2014, KELY launched Talk2Me IM (Instant Messaging), a pilot bilingual WhatsApp helpline which is offered to all youth (14–24 years old) in Hong Kong, who are in need of emotional and psychological support. Run by a team of experienced counsellors and psychologists, Talk2Me IM claims to provide quick, responsive, and accessible emotional and psychological support, mental health assessments and referrals using a youth-friendly service during the weekend when other options are not always available.

== Funding ==
The annual Peninsula Mooncake Charity Sale was established since 2007 to help the organisation raise funds. Other activities have included the Mother's Day Lunch, "Auction Extravaganza" and "The Power of Youth" classical music charity concert.

KELY is a full member of the Hong Kong Council of Social Service and The Community Chest of Hong Kong. The group has also received funding and support from other organisations. While it does not operate primarily on government subsidy, a small portion of its programming is supported by governmental funds. These include the Beat Drugs Fund of the Hong Kong Narcotics Division, under the Hong Kong government's Security Bureau, for initiatives for ethnic minority and non-Chinese speaking youth, including Narcotics Division Life Skills Education Workshops, and It Begins with One Story.

== Past programmes and publications ==
MATCH was a youth magazine produced by secondary school students in Hong Kong, aiming at promoting free expression, interest in current affairs and learning experiences in the media. It aimed to help teenagers deal with issues such as sex, relationships, drugs, and eating disorders through creative writing. It also covered local issues including education, employment, environment and pop culture. The magazine was distributed at no cost to over 500 secondary schools, youth agencies and various public libraries in Hong Kong.

KELY published a series of "harm reduction cards", aiming to promote a healthy and positive lifestyle in young people. In 1999, KELY outreach workers had distributed 10,000 'harm reduction' cards printed in English and Chinese on depression, sex and alcohol. Staff distributed the cards at raves and dance parties on a regular basis to reach the target audience.

In 1997–1998, KELY was granted HKD 75, 125 to run the project "The Low-Down on Drugs", which produced a booklet on drugs. The booklet is bilingual and colour-printed. The booklets were handed out to schools, libraries, agencies that work with drugs problems and anyone who made a telephone enquiry about drug-related information.
