= Crisis hotline =

Service providing immediate emergency telephone counseling

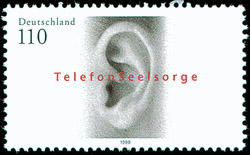
German postal stamp from 1998 advertising a crisis hotline

A crisis hotline is a phone number people can call to get immediate emergency telephone counseling, usually by trained volunteers. The first such service was founded in England in 1951 and such hotlines have existed in most major cities of the English speaking world at least since the mid-1970s. Initially set up to help those contemplating suicide, many have expanded their mandate to deal more generally with emotional crises. Similar hotlines operate to help people in other circumstances, including rape, eating disorders, bullying, self-harm, runaway children, human trafficking, and people who identify as LGBTQ+ or intersex. Despite crisis hotlines being common, their effectiveness in reducing suicides is not clear.

== Effectiveness ==
Even though crisis hotlines are common, they have not been well studied for efficacy. One study found that people's thoughts of suicide decreased during a call to a crisis line, and were lessened for several weeks after their call.

== History ==
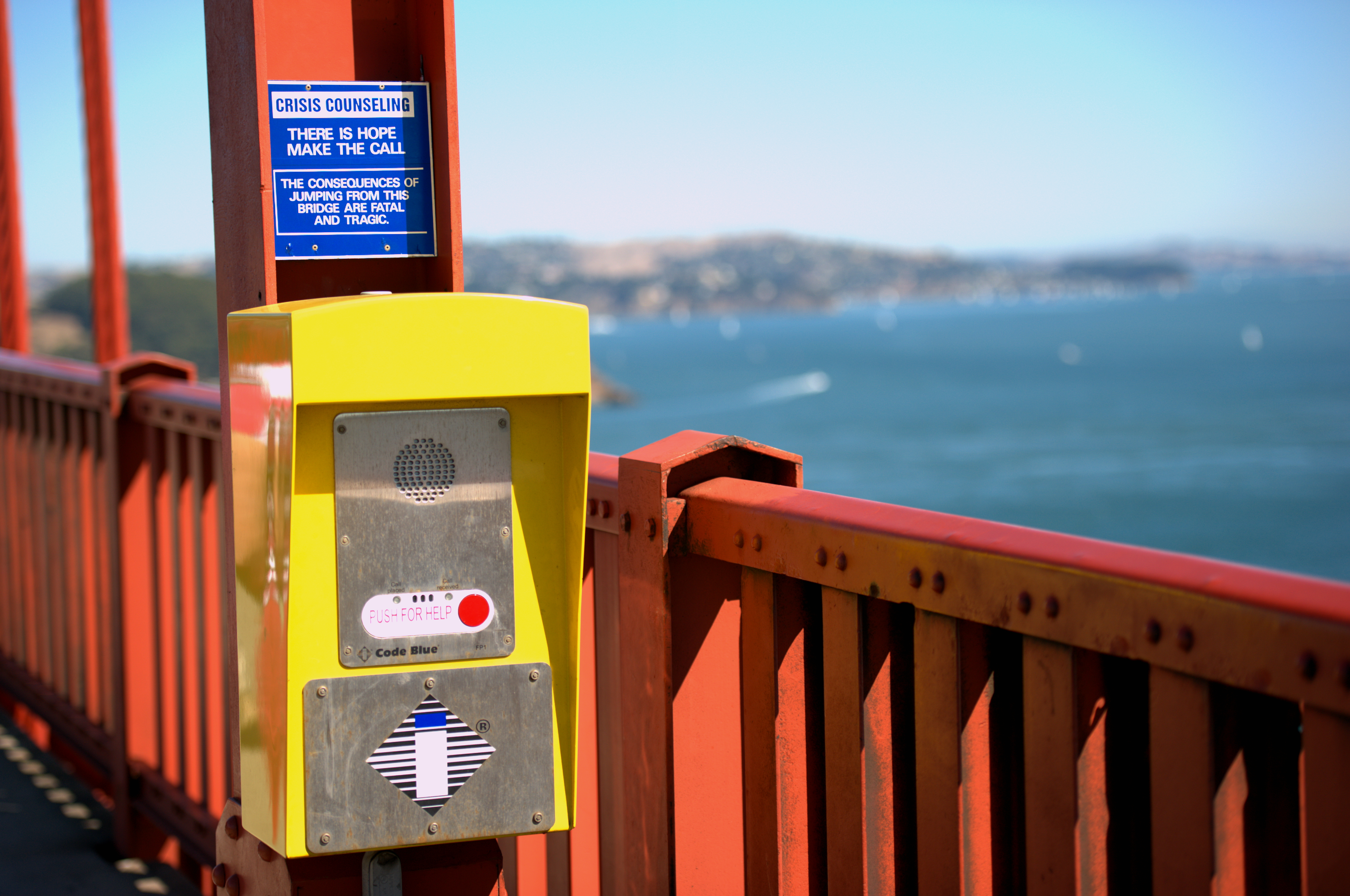
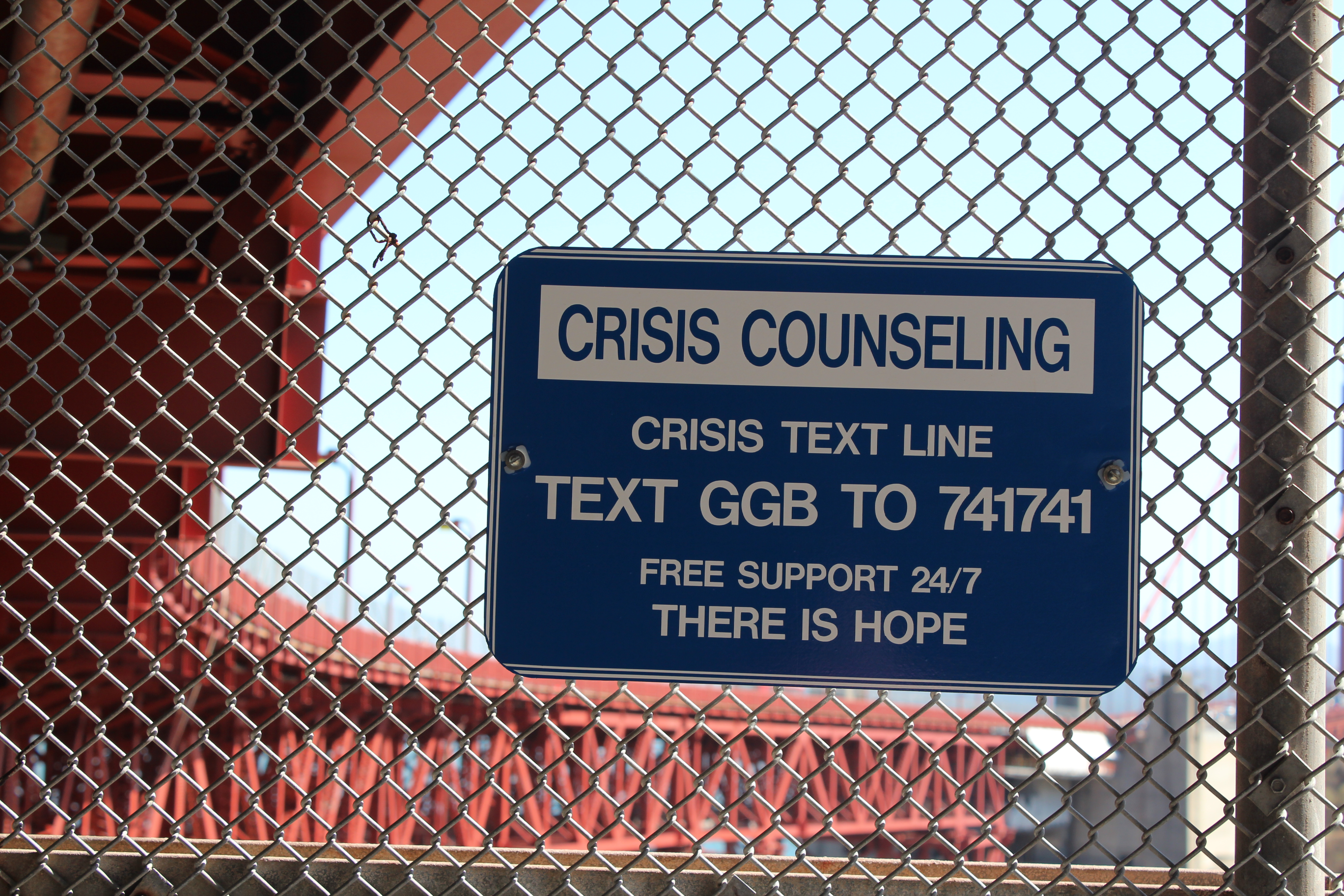
As a suicide prevention initiative, these signs on the Golden Gate Bridge promote a special telephone that connects to a crisis hotline, as well as a 24/7 crisis text line.

A poster for the 988 Suicide & Crisis Lifeline (under its former name, the National Suicide Prevention Lifeline), a crisis line in the United States and Canada

Such services began in 1953, when Chad Varah, an English vicar, founded The Samaritans service, which soon established branches throughout the United Kingdom. The first Samaritans branch in the United States was established in Boston in 1974.

Crisis and Suicide Hotline started in Seattle in 1964; it is run by Crisis Connections, formerly Crisis Clinic after the assault of a 12-year old girl by a letter carrier. In addition to Boston, there are currently Samaritan branches in Falmouth, Massachusetts (serving the Cape Cod and Islands area), the Merrimack Valley, and the Fall River/New Bedford area. Outside of Massachusetts, there are branches in New York City, Providence, Hartford, Albany, and Keene, New Hampshire.

In the United States, the Los Angeles Suicide Prevention Center was founded in 1958, and was the first in the country to provide a 24-hour suicide prevention crisis line and use community volunteers in providing hotline service. Bernard Mayes started the San Francisco Suicide Prevention with a hotline named "Call Bruce" in 1962. A similar service, Lifeline, was established in Australia in 1963.

Another service, the volunteer-run crisis helpline Lifelink Samaritans Tas. Inc, originally called Launceston Lifelink, was established in 1968 by concerned citizens of Launceston, Tasmania, who decided to create a phone service based on the principles of The Samaritans. The rationale was that people often become suicidal because they cannot discuss their emotional pain with family and friends.

This service provides emotional support 24 hours a day to people throughout Tasmania and does not have any religious affiliations. The organization is a member of Befrienders Worldwide and has a "twinning" relationship with Northampton Samaritans in the UK. Lifelink Samaritans is the oldest telephone befriending service in Tasmania and the fourth oldest in Australia and receives at least 5,000 calls a year. In December 2018, Lifelink Samaritans celebrated 50 years of service.

== Telephone counseling ==
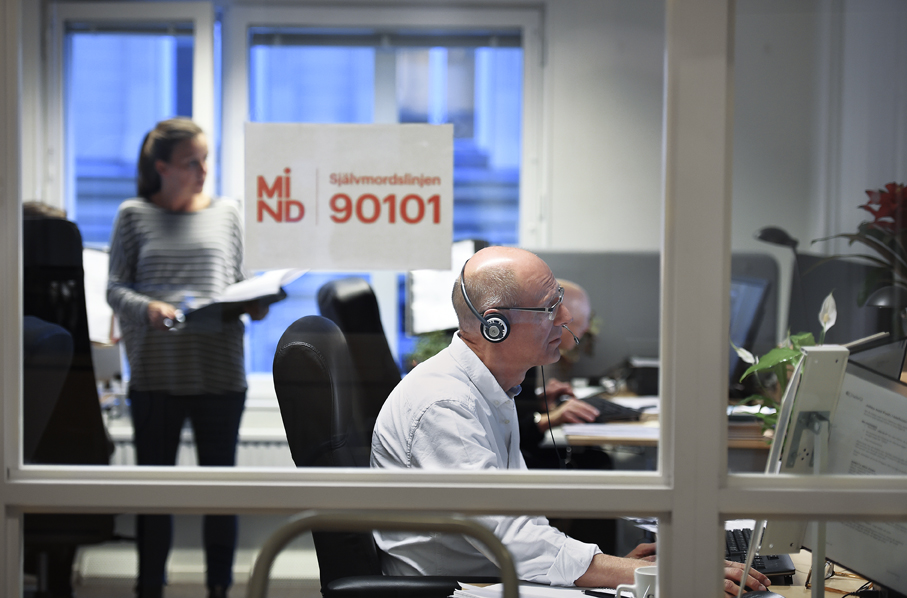
An operator for Sweden's Mind Självmordslinjen (suicide prevention hotline) at work.

Telephone emotional support and crisis hotlines provide a similar telephone support service, and both usually accept crisis and non-crisis calls. In the United States, many college campuses have established telephone counseling lines serviced by volunteers. These hotlines serve callers in crisis, but also serve to provide a listening ear for people who "just need to talk". Typically, hotlines are staffed by trained professionals, and are not intended to replace professional, long-term counseling services. They are rather intended to carry callers through an immediate situation. Such hotlines exist at the University of Maryland, the University of Minnesota, Tufts University, Columbia University, Cornell University, Drexel University, Caldwell University, and Texas A&M University.

The term "emotional support helpline" is sometimes used – which does not imply crisis or counseling, and can include email and text messaging. Such services have allowed for the wider dissemination of resources for people facing mental health crises.

With developments in mobile telephony, the use of text or SMS (short message service) has been utilized by counseling services. Youthline, a youth-oriented crisis helpline in New Zealand, began providing a text messaging counseling support line in 2004.

== Contact details ==
Country	Organization/Purpose/Focus	Hotline/Resource
Australia	Lifeline offers 24/7 crisis support and suicide prevention services by phone. The organisation also has an online chat service.	13 11 14
Australia	Suicide Call Back Service is a nationwide service that provides professional 24/7 telephone and online counselling to people who are affected by suicide. In addition, the organisation also provides online chat and video chat services	1300 659 467
Australia	Beyond Blue provides nationwide information and support regarding anxiety, depression, and suicide. The helpline is available 24 hours a day, 7 days a week. In addition, the organisation also provides online chat.	1300 224 636
Australia	Kids Helpline is a 24-hour nationwide service that provides access to crisis support, suicide prevention and counselling services for Australians aged 5–25. In addition the Kids Helpline does also provide online chat services.	1800 55 1800
Brazil	Centro de Valorização da Vida (CVV)	188
Mexico	Consejo Psicológico e Intervención en Crisis por Teléfono (SAPTEL) is available 24 hours a day, 365 days a year.	0155 5259-8121
India	Muktaa Mental Health Helpline is available from 12 to 8 PM IST.	0788-788-9882
Iran	Iran Crisis Text Line: It is a free, confidential 24/7 national text-message service.	123
New Zealand	Lifeline Aotearoa is an organization providing free 24-hour counseling and phone help lines. It provides support, information and resources to people at risk of suicide, family and friends affected by suicide and people supporting someone with suicidal thoughts and/or suicidal behaviours.	0800 LIFELINE (0800 543 354) 4357 (Text)
New Zealand	The Lowdown, website developed by the New Zealand Ministry of Health aimed at young New Zealanders suffering from depression	0800 111 757 (depression); 0800 37 66 33 (general youth issues)
North Macedonia	Кризен Центар „Надеж“: Provides crisis intervention and support services. Available 24/7.	02/ 15 - 315 (SOS) 2 3173 - 424 (North Macedonia)
Philippines	National Center for Mental Health Crisis Hotline. Available 24/7.	1800-1888-1553 (Toll free landline) 0919-057-1553 (Mobile)
United Kingdom and Ireland	Samaritans provides a hotline providing emotional support in the UK and Ireland.	116 123
Canada	Talk Suicide Canada, a 24/7 hotline for callers in the Canada	1-833-456-4566; 45645 (Text, 4 p.m. to midnight ET only); 988 service TBD
United States	United Way, a hotline for accessing local services	211
United States (participating cities)	Hotline for non-emergency municipal services	311
United States and Canada (regional)	Hotline for road and traffic conditions	511
United States	The 988 Suicide & Crisis Lifeline, a 24/7 hotline for callers in the United States	988
United States	TDD/TTY services at the National Suicide Prevention Lifeline	711 or a preferred relay service then 988
United States	National Runaway Safeline, hotline and live chat for runaway, homeless, and at-risk youth	1-800-RUNAWAY (1-800-786-2929)
United States	US Veterans Crisis Hotline	988; Then press 1 when prompted
United States	An American hotline aimed principally at LGBT teenagers, run by The Trevor Project	866-48-TREVOR (866-488-7386)
United States	American anonymous youth violence reporting hotline created by The Center to Prevent Youth Violence	1-866-SPEAK-UP (1-866-773-2587)
United States	The Boys Town National Hotline, a 24/7 hotline staffed by specially trained Boys Town counselors	1-800-448-3000
United States, Canada, United Kingdom	A free, 24/7 SMS Hotline providing emotional support for those in crisis provided by Crisis Text Line. In Canada, the service is also provided with a partnership by Kids Help Phone. In the U.K, Shout, an affiliate to the hotline that was founded by the Royal Foundation, operates in the U.K.	741-741 (United States); 686-868 (Canada); 85258 (United Kingdom)

The Volunteer Emotional Support Helplines (VESH) represents 1200 member centres in 61 countries. It has been formed by:

- Befrienders Worldwide (maintained by the Samaritans UK)
- IFOTES – International Federation of Telephone Emergency Services
- Lifeline International

== See also ==
- Emergency telephone number
- Harmonised service of social value
- Hotline
- List of counseling topics
- Telephone counseling
- Crisis Hotline: Veterans Press 1 (2013 documentary film)
- Harry Marsh Warren#Save-a-Life League
- Overdose monitoring service
- Quitline
