= Harry Marsh Warren =

American Baptist minister (1861–1940)

Harry Marsh Warren (1861–1940), (AKA Henry) was a Baptist minister from New Hampshire, USA. He was ordained in 1891 and became the pastor of Central Park Baptist Church, New York. During the late 1890s and the early 1900s he became known as the hotel chaplain, attending to the spiritual needs of the transient visitors to the city. In 1906 a woman staying at a New York hotel asked the staff to contact him. They failed to locate him and in the morning the woman was found unconscious due to self administered poison. Warren realised that had he talked to her he may have prevented her suicide attempt, and resolved to help others in similar circumstances. He dedicated the rest of his life to this end and founded a voluntary organisation called Save-a-Life League, believed to be the first in the country. It has been estimated that many thousands of lives were save by the work of this organisation.

== Early life ==
Warren’s parents were Eliza Ann Brown (1824-1891) and William Warren (1818-1861), who made woodworking planes with his brother, Cyrus Warren, in Hudson, New Hampshire. Warren was the youngest of their five children born in Hudson on the 19 April 1861.

Three weeks after Warren was born his father died, leaving his mother to raise the family. She lived almost next door to her brother-in-law, Cyrus, and he may have provided some support. However, in 1868 she remarried to a local 75 year old widowed farmer called, Philip Sargent Hart, who died within 5 months. By about 1870 the family were living in Chester, New Hampshire, where Warren attended Walnut Hill primary school, then Chester Academy and later Pinkerton Academy. In 1880 he was still living in Chester with his mother and his older brother William, who had become a farmer.

Following this he took up teaching posts in surrounding districts before attending Colgate University, Columbia University and Union Theological Seminary (New York City), graduating 1891. In 1888 he became a member of the Phi Kappa Psi fraternity. Later the degree of Doctor of Divinity was conferred on him by the University of Tennessee and he received a Ph.D. from Temple College, Philadelphia. While in theological school he assisted in the Fifth Avenue Baptist Church, New York, where he was instrumental in starting bible classes, work later continued by John D. Rockefeller Jr. He was ordained in the Nepperhan Avenue Baptist Church and became pastor of the First Baptist Church, Salem, Massachusetts, and then pastor for several years of the Central Park Baptist Church, New York.

In 1893 he married Adelaide Everett Butler (1870-1956), the daughter of a hardware merchant, who was a member of the Fifth Avenue Baptist Church. The Warrens had three children: Donald, who died in infancy, daughter Beatrice, and Harry Marsh Warren Jr., who eventually took over the management of the Save-a-Life League from his father.

== Hotel chaplain and the parish of All Strangers ==
During his work as pastor in the Fifth Avenue and Central Park Baptist churches he came into contact with people who were visiting the city. He estimated that there could be as many as one hundred thousand per day staying in local hotels, and saw the benefit of offering them access to a pastor. He held a trial church service in a hotel lobby that was attended by seventy-five people and this encouraged him to continue. He maintained a non-denominational approach inviting ministers from other creeds to assist. In 1903 he left the Central Park Baptist Church to focus on ministering to this parish of All Strangers, becoming known as the Hotel Chaplain. He was able to take this course of action because of a large bequest made to him in the will of Joseph Richardson, who died in 1897. (Note: Richardson was a wealthy developer who is best remembered today for building a 5ft wide "Spite House", corner of Eighty-second Street and Lexington Avenue.) The will was contested so it was not until 1903 that the money was released and Warren received $30,000.

In addition to holding services he became involved with the spiritual welfare of his transient flock, visiting them in hospitals, asylums, court rooms, prisons and made himself available for weddings and funerals. He was always available for wedding and became known as the Midnight Marrying Parson. He had a relaxed approach to couples who wanted to get married, not appearing to be concerned about their circumstances. One example of this was when Mary Lewis Bollback, and Kress Koyama, tried to find a minister to marry them in New York. They were continually refused and they were led to believe that this antipathy was based on racial grounds, due to Koyama’s oriental ethnicity. Warren was approached by the couple and he had no problems with marrying them, although the ceremony was performed in the chapel of a funeral parlour at a few minutes to midnight. He married young couples that had eloped, even when their parents objected, and it was also rumoured that he passed on stories to newspaper reporters.

The Hotel Association of New York initially cooperated with Warren, and many hotels put notices in their reception with his contact details. However, the high number of weddings Warren performed per year, and adverse publicity, became a contentious issue. At this time in New York, licenses were not required before a couple could wed, and Warren married people, day or night, often at his home with his wife acting as witness. Warren claimed that he made no charge for marrying couples, but was grateful for any donations that they offered. In 1907 the Hotel Association abolished the office of Hotel Chaplain and in 1908 an act of law was passed in New York that required all couples to obtain a licence before they could marry. (Note: An Act to Amend the Domestic Relations Law by Providing for Marriage Licenses) This curtailed Warren's ability to marry couples "on demand". In 1907 the New York Protestant Episcopal Church appointed its own "Hotel Chaplain" for the city of New York; he was James B Wasson (1862-1927). Warren continued his ministry but became more involved with matters related to the prevention of suicide.

== Save-a-Life League ==
In 1906 a woman staying in a New York hotel asked the staff to contact Warren so that she could talk to him. They failed to locate him and in the morning the woman was found unconscious having taken poison. She was revived in hospital but the effects of the potion would prove fatal. Warren visited her before she died and realised that if had been able to talk to her the suicide attempt could have been prevented.

He put advertisements in newspapers and left his card at hotels urging those who were considering self destruction to contact him. He was soon dealing with people who were seeking his help, said to be as many as eight per day. The data he gathered made it possible for him to become proactive and identify risk groups. He contacted police, hospitals, churches and the medical examiner’s office to follow up suicide attempts in order to offer support and provide practical assistance. In the early days he was made aware that some of the data he gathered about suicides from the authorities in New York was not necessarily accurate. The secretary of the New York’s chief medical examiner, George P LeBrun, explained that suicides were sometimes misreported as accidents, or they were concealed in such a way as to avoid publicity.

In 1915 after nine years pioneering work in the field of suicide prevention, Warren expanded his operation. The organisation became known as the Save-a-Life League, with a committee of prominent people (including George P LeBrun) plus an office in New York, staffed with volunteer helpers. Funding was by donations and used to help families of those who had been affected by suicide or attempted suicide. Later this organisation was extended to other parts of the United States and renamed the National Save-a-Life League, with representatives in thirty-five cities. Warren also made available his home in Hastings-on Hudson, for those who needed a period of rest and reflection. This was 18 Calumet Avenue, Hastings, the former home of the Wuppermann family, who had built their wealth through distributing Angostura bitters. Actors Frank and Ralph Morgan (members of the Wuppermann family) had also lived in this house.

Harry Marsh Warren died in his 80th year in Chappaqua, Westchester, New York, and was buried in Oakwood Cemetery.
