= Lifeline (crisis support service) =

Australian mental health support service

- Founded: 16 March 1963
- Founder: Reverend Dr Sir Alan Walker
- Type: Non-profit
- Registration no.: 84081031263
- Legal status: Charity
- Purpose: Mental health
- Location: National office: Sydney
- Region served: Australia
- Product: Telephone and online crisis support
- Members: 17
- Owner: Wesley Mission
- Key people: CEO: Colin Seery; Chairperson: Jacinta Munro
- Subsidiaries: Lifeline Direct
- Revenue: $116,078,706 (2024)
- Expenses: $114,647,217 (2024)
- Employees: 256
- Volunteers: 10,000
- Website: www.lifeline.org.au

Lifeline is a non-profit organisation that provides free, 24-hour telephone crisis support service in Australia. Volunteer crisis supporters provide suicide prevention services, mental health support and emotional assistance through methods via telephone, face-to-face communication and online.

The telephone service can be accessed by calling 13 11 14 within Australia.

Telephone crisis support is provided via a network of Lifeline Centres maintained by trained volunteers and some paid staff. Lifeline Centres are owned and operated by affiliate member organisations of Lifeline Australia, some of which are wholly owned subsidiaries of the national group, and some of which are local branches of the Uniting Church in Australia.

As at August 2022, there are 41 Lifeline Centres, spanning across 60 locations around Australia in every state and territory. About 11,000 volunteers deliver support services, while approximately 1,000 staff provide administration and fundraising co-ordination. Some Lifeline Centres also provide other support services which may include face-to-face counselling, group support, assistance with food and utility bills, support for the elderly and frail, and related services.

Lifeline has over 250 retail outlets around the country which sell a variety of clothes, furniture and bric-a-brac. Some Lifeline Centres have a number of stores but not all Lifeline Centres have retail outlets.

== History ==
Lifeline was founded in Sydney in 1963 by Alan Walker after a call from a distressed man who three days later took his own life. Determined not to let loneliness, isolation and anxiety be the cause of other deaths, Walker launched a crisis line which initially operated out of the Methodist Central Mission (now known as Wesley Mission).

Lifeline Sydney was two years in planning and preparation, with 150 people attending a nine-month training course to work at the centre. A century old, dilapidated building owned by the Mission, on the fringes of downtown Sydney was renovated for the purposes of this new support centre. A staff of full-time employees was appointed to direct the work of these new telephone crisis support 'workers'. The Director General of Post and Telephone Services authorised that this crisis support service should be listed on the Emergency Page of the Telephone Directory and the phones were installed.

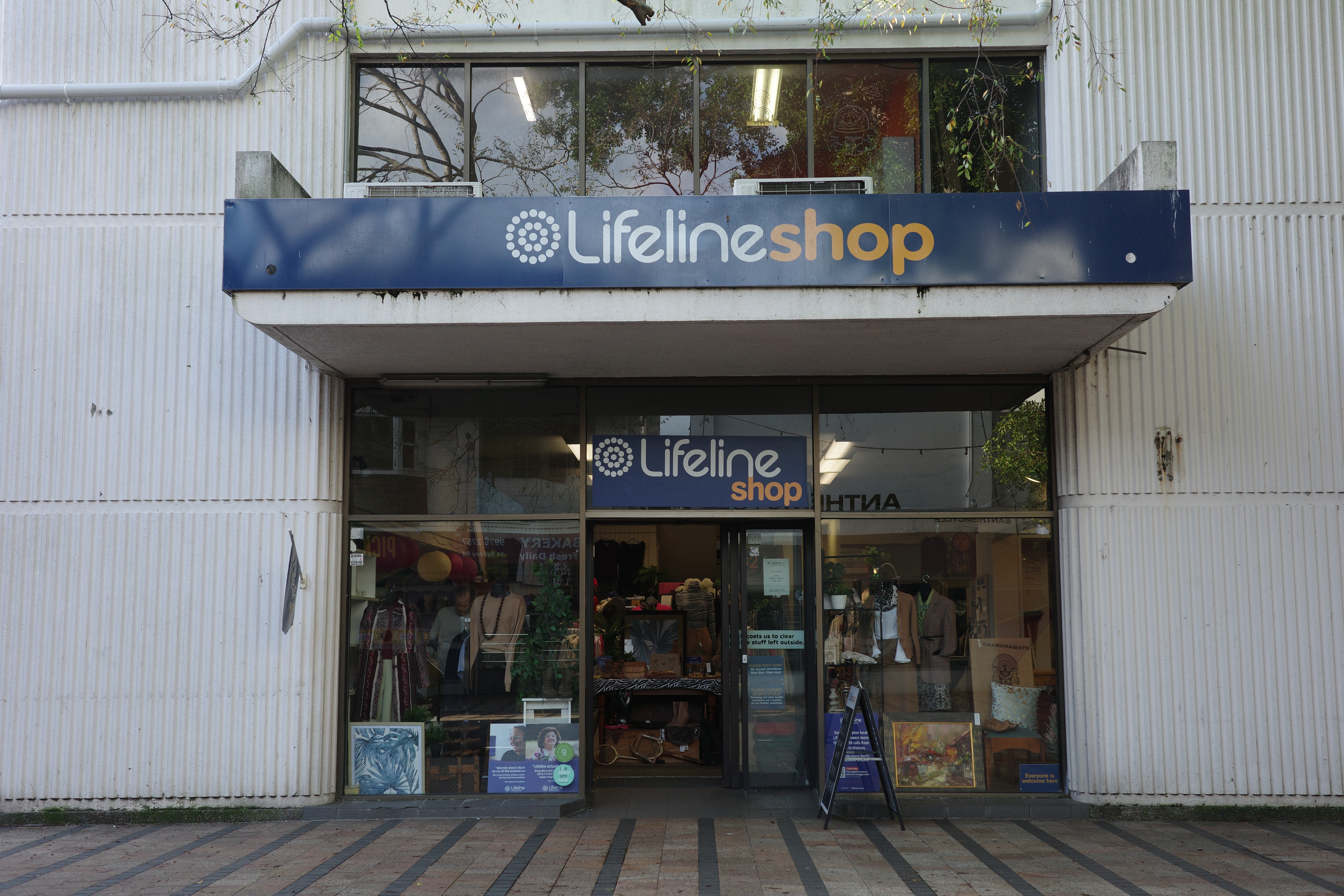
A Lifeline shop in Sydney

March 1963 saw the opening of the first official Lifeline Centre. The initiative was well received with over 100 calls for help being answered on the first day.

In January 1964, Lifeline was featured in an article in Time magazine, which helped lead to the establishment of similar services around the world.

The first international convention of Lifeline was held in Sydney in August 1966 to guide the development of Lifeline services and to establish quality standards, which led to the formation of Lifeline International.

In 1994, Lifeline transitioned the 24-hour telephone crisis support line to a single national priority 13 number (13 11 14).

In 2007, Lifeline introduced national call flow to the 24-hour service. This allowed Lifeline to begin flowing calls nationally over a wide area network, to be answered by the next available telephone support volunteer, anywhere in the country.

Lifeline started Australia's first text-based crisis support service in 2018.

== Usage ==
Lifeline receives about one million requests for help every year. In the 2023–2024 financial year, the national charity received 1,091,425 calls to their crisis lines (13 11 14, 13HELP, and 13YARN) and answered 127,909 requests to its online crisis support chat service. In the 2023–2024 financial year, Lifeline reported an income stream consisting of 81% from grants and fundraising ($93,181,268), sale of goods and services at 9% ($10,775,405) and 8% from other sources. Income is then distributed to: service delivery at 53% ($60,619,585), fundraising at 6% ($7,237,231), and administration at 10% ($11,104,059).

Lifeline saw a marked increase of calls during the COVID-19 pandemic; where Lifeline would receive an average of 2,400 calls a day before the pandemic, the organisation regularly received around 3,400 calls a day during the pandemic. In March 2020, Lifeline responded to almost 90,000 calls, equivalent to one every 30 seconds, with Lifeline receiving 3,200 calls on Friday 10 April 2020 alone. August 2021 was the busiest month in Lifeline's history, with their record for most calls in a single day being broken 4 times that month. On Thursday 19 August 2021, Lifeline received 3,505 calls, the single busiest day in the organisation's history.

== Confidentiality ==
Despite allowing for anonymity, Lifeline will contact authorities and identify the caller in cases where they believe the person may be serious in taking their own life. Lifeline will disclose caller information if "we reasonably believe that the disclosure will prevent or lessen a serious and imminent threat to somebody's life, health or safety (including your own) or serious threat to public health, property or public safety".

== See also ==
- Crisis hotline
- List of suicide crisis lines
- Beyond Blue
- Kids Helpline
