= Shun Tak Fraternal Association Leung Kau Kui College =

Secondary school in Hong Kong

Coordinates: 22.3875°N 113.9778°E

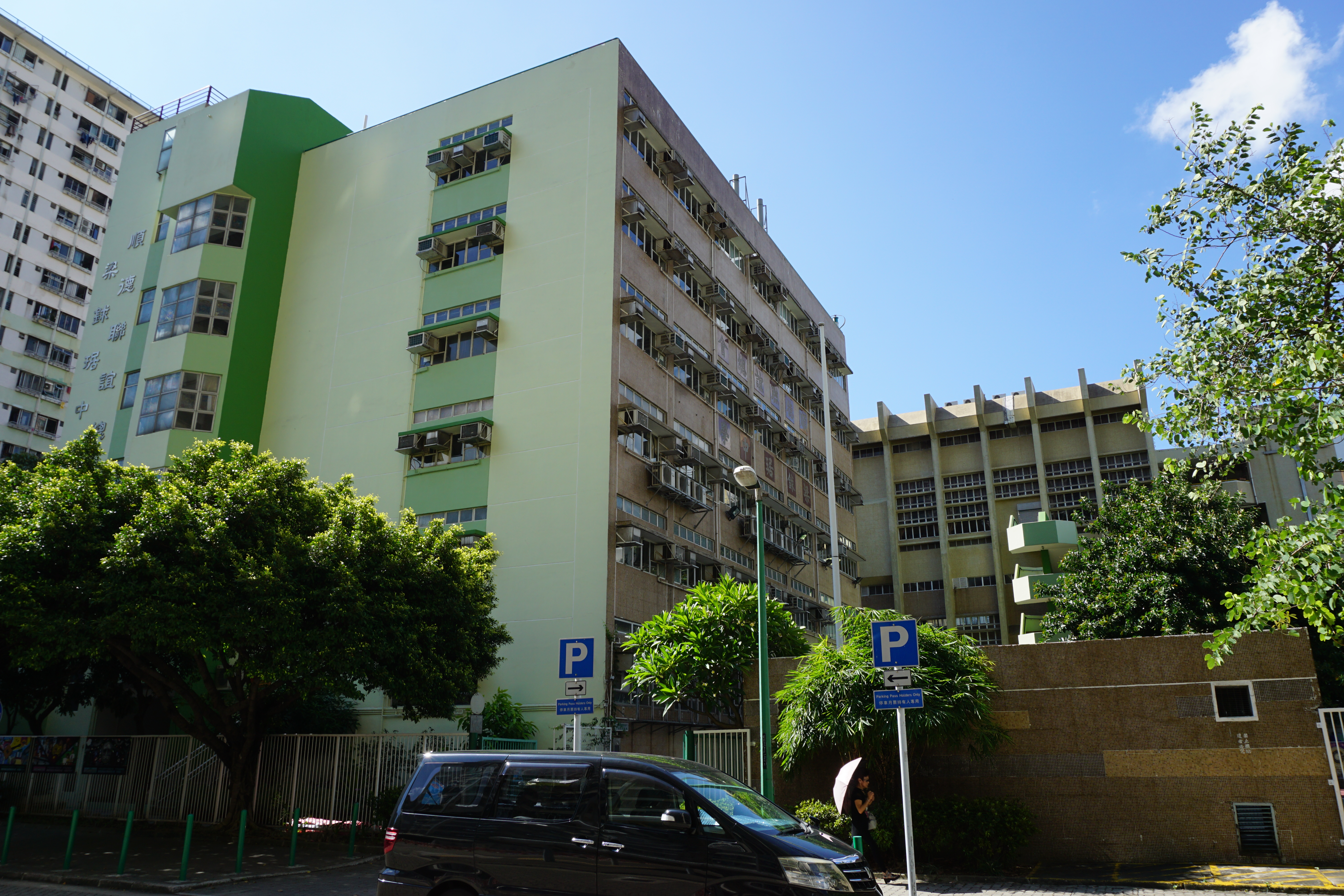

Location
- On Ting Estate, Tuen Mun, New Territories, Hong Kong

Information
- Other name: 順德聯誼總會梁銶琚中學
- Type: English medium
- Established: 1981
- School district: Tuen Mun
- Staff: c. 80
- Faculty: 59
- Grades: Form 1 to Form 6
- Enrollment: 1092
- Affiliation: Shun Tak Fraternal Association
- Website: www.lkkc.edu.hk

Shun Tak Fraternal Association Leung Kau Kui College
- Traditional Chinese: 順德聯誼總會梁銶琚中學
- Simplified Chinese: 顺德联谊总会梁𨱇琚中学
Transcriptions
Standard Mandarin
- Hanyu Pinyin: Shùndé Liányì Zǒng Huì Liáng Qiújū Zhōngxué
Yue: Cantonese
- Jyutping: seon6 dak1 lyun4 ji4 zung2 wui6 loeng4 kau4 geoi1 zung1 hok6

Shun Tak Fraternal Association Leung Kau Kui College (Chinese: 順德聯誼總會梁銶琚中學) is a government-funded secondary school, located in On Ting Estate, Tuen Mun, Hong Kong. The school was founded in 1981. The school is a member of the Shun Tak Fraternal Association group of schools.

In 2008, STFA Leung Kau Kui College became the sister school of the Leung Kau Kui Vocational High School and First Middle School of Shunde, both located in Foshan, Guangdong Province, China.

The school has 60 teachers, each class has a class teacher and an assistant teacher. All students are divided into four School Houses, namely: Man, Heng, Chung, and Shun House. The School Houses compete in Athletic Competitions, and other interhouse competitions.
