= Befrienders Worldwide =

Suicide prevention charity

Befrienders Worldwide is a charity that helps people who are considering suicide or experiencing general emotional distress. They have 349 emotional support centres in 32 countries, reaching an estimated 7 million people each year. Volunteers listen without judging people or telling them what to do, and can be contacted by phone, email, SMS, internet chat or in person, dependent on location.

As Befrienders Worldwide evolved from the Samaritans in the UK, some of its centres use the name Samaritans, while others use Befrienders or similar. The primary aim of all centres is to relieve distress and thus reduce the number of deaths by suicide. They recognise "the importance of being listened to, in confidence, anonymously, and without prejudice" and "value that a person has the fundamental decision about their own life." They have no political, religious or sectarian affiliations and the beliefs of volunteers are not imposed onto callers. Experienced volunteers select, train and supervise other volunteers; individual member centres also support each other and share information.

Besides a list of national organisations where people can find help in their own countries, the Befrienders Website has general information about depression, suicide warning signs, and other topics.

== See also ==
- The Befrienders, a TV series about The Samaritans
