= Dress for Success =

Dress for Success may refer to:

- Dress for Success (book), a best-selling 1975 book by John T. Molloy
- Dress for Success (organization), established by Nancy Lublin to provide women with interview suits and career development training
- "Dress for Success" (Ugly Betty), an episode from the third season of the TV series Ugly Betty
