= DoSomething =

American nonprofit organization

DoSomething.org
- Type: Non-profit
- Industry: Nonprofit
- Founded: 1993
- Founders: Andrew Shue; Michael Sanchez
- Headquarters: New York City, New York, U.S.
- Key people: DeNora Getachew, CEO; Nancy Lublin, Former CEO; Aria Finger, Former CEO
- Products: Global Campaigns
- Revenue: US$14,131,513 United States (2017)
- Total assets: 15,303,113 United States dollar (2022)
- Website: dosomething.org

DoSomething (also known as DoSomething.org) is an international nonprofit organization that aims to inspire and engage young people to create positive change in the world, both online and offline, through various campaigns. The organization is led by CEO DeNora Getachew.

== History ==
The organization was co-founded in 1993 by American actor Andrew Shue and Michael Sanchez. They stated their motivation was to encourage young people to become active citizens and leaders while also making community involvement fun.

== Overview ==
According to the website, DoSomething.org, the organization has members throughout the United States and in 131 countries.

In 2013, DoSomething.org launched TMI, a strategy consultancy that helps brands "drive social change through insights and creative solutions backed by data from millions of young people."

=== Teens for Jeans ===
"Teens For Jeans" was established in 2008 out of a partnership with Aéropostale. The campaign looks to help clothe the over one million homeless teens across the country by providing a highly requested item: jeans. People were encouraged to bring their gently worn jeans to Aéropostale, which donates to over 1,000 homeless shelters in the United States and Canada. In 2011, 542,000 pairs of jeans were collected, and in 2012, 902,500 pairs of jeans were collected. Celebrities that have worked with the Teens for Jeans campaign include Nigel Barker, Jay Sean, Nikki Blonsky, Chace Crawford, David Archuleta, Ashley Greene, Justin Long, Demi Lovato, Rachel Crow, Drew Barrymore, Chloë Grace Moretz, Fifth Harmony, and The Vamps.

=== Reboot Camp ===
In partnership with blue California, dosomething.org created a camp to teach teenagers about mental health.

=== Pregnancy Text ===
DoSomething.org's Pregnancy Text, a campaign around teen pregnancy, turned young people's cell phones into "virtual babies." According to the organization's website, 132,782 young people used the Pregnancy Text to prank their friends with a phone baby to start the conversation about teen pregnancy.

=== Diversify My Emoji ===
DoSomething.org powered the petition that convinced Apple to create non-white emoji options. DoSomething.org Head of Campaigns Michaela Bethune told The Washington Post, Diversify My Emoji "demonstrates how online action, with the appropriate target, methods, scale, and platform, can achieve real offline impact."

=== Get the Filter Out (GTFO) ===
In 2015, DoSomething.org partnered with Truth, the nation's longest-running and most successful youth smoking prevention campaign, to encourage young people to clean up cigarette butts before they had the chance to harm wildlife or leach toxic chemicals into the environment. The organizations teamed up with rapper Jake Miller on a public service announcement. According to its website, young people cleaned up 3.7 million cigarette butts to protect the planet through the campaign.

=== Grandparents Gone Wired ===
DoSomething.org and the AARP Foundation partnered for Grandparents Gone Wired, an annual campaign that encourages young people to pass their technological expertise onto older adults in their lives. Internet personality iJustine, as well as Nev Schulman and Max Joseph from MTV's Catfish: The TV Show, have served as spokespeople for the campaign. According to its website, the campaign helped 11,753 older adults stay up-to-date on technology.

=== Nude Awakening ===
In 2015, on National Nude Day, July 14, DoSomething.org member Luis Torres launched a campaign called Nude Awakening. The campaign asked young people to leave comments on Merriam-Webster's website and social media, demanding the definition of the word "nude" become more inclusive. According to the DoSomething.org website, the campaign digitally advocated for justice and convinced Merriam-Webster to change its racist definition of "nude".

=== Game-Winning Drive ===
DoSomething.org teamed up with ESPN to encourage young people to run sports equipment drives in various communities. DoSomething.org and ESPN's Game-Winning Drive campaign was the largest youth-led sports drive and collected 44,173 pieces of gear for kids in underserved communities.

=== Power to the Period ===
In 2016, DoSomething.org partnered with the U by Kotex brand to run Power to the Period, the first national drive for menstrual products. The organization teamed up with Internet personality Ingrid Nilsen who recorded a PSA for the campaign. Through the campaign, 585,965 period products were donated to homeless shelters from 50,257 participants.

=== Smiles for Soldiers ===
In 2016, DoSomething.org teamed up with Johnson & Johnson for a campaign called Smiles for Soldiers that asked young people to make thank-you cards for military service members. Actor Colton Haynes joined the campaign and recorded a public service announcement for the campaign. According to the organization's website, through the campaign, young people sent 148,645 cards to military service members to show gratitude and help service members feel connected to home.

=== Comeback Clothes ===
DoSomething.org's "Comeback Clothes" campaign launched in April 2014 in partnership with H&M. Young people are encouraged to recycle used and old clothes by bringing them to their nearest H&M. This program was paused in 2020 due to the COVID-19 pandemic.

=== Notes From Shawn ===
DoSomething.org partnered with singer Shawn Mendes to help boost the self-esteem of millions of young people across the nation. Inspired by lyrics from Mendes's song "Life of the Party", the organization teamed up with the musician to spread positivity. By posting sticky notes with positive and uplifting messages written on them, DoSomething members sought to bring happiness to people, aiming to stop teens from self-harming.

== Do Something Awards ==
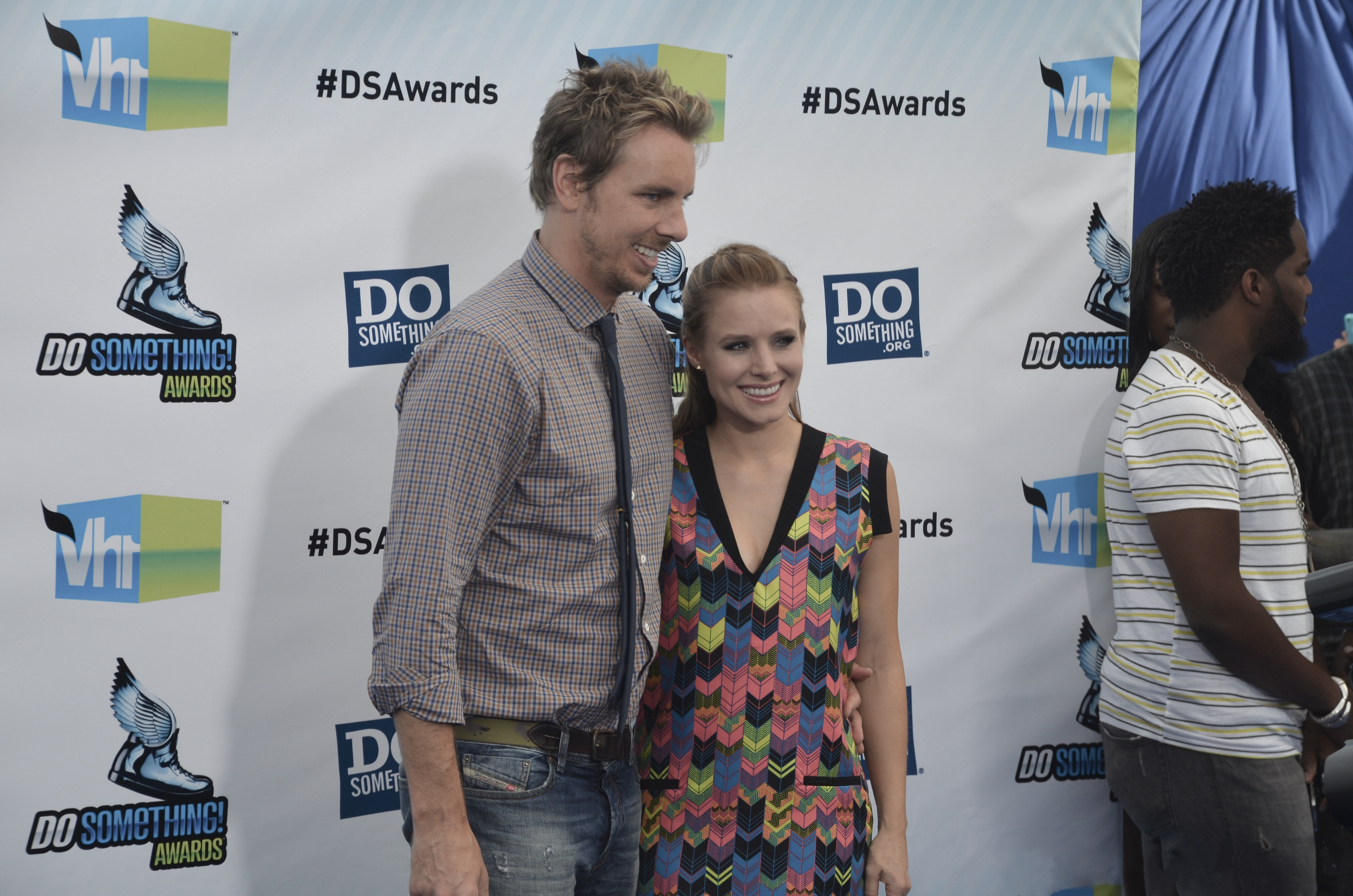
Dax Shepard and Kristen Bell at the 2012 DoSomething Awards held in Santa Monica

The awards were inaugurated in 1996 (as the BR!CK Awards) to recognise young people 25 and under who have done outstanding work in their communities and the world. After their relaunch in 2007 as the Do Something Awards, they recognise both young people making social change and individuals from the entertainment industry who have dedicated their time to activism and charity. The top four Do Something Awards nominees receive a $10,000 community grant, while the grand prize winner receives a $100,000 grant to push their community projects forward. The Awards were broadcast for the first time in 2007.

In 2011, the Do Something Awards was hosted by Jane Lynch at the Hollywood Palladium in Los Angeles, California, and was broadcast on VH1. The list of performers includes Demi Lovato, Foster the People, OneRepublic featuring B.o.B and many other celebrities such as Justin Bieber, Lady Gaga, Adam Lambert, Kristen Bell, Nick Cannon, David Beckham and Kim Kardashian.

In 2012, the DoSomething Awards were hosted by New Girl cast members Jake Johnson, Max Greenfield, and Lamorne Morris.

In 2013, the Do Something Awards was hosted by Sophia Bush at The Avalon in Hollywood, California and was broadcast on VH1. The list of presenters includes Harry Shum, Joan and Melissa Rivers, Darren Criss, Russell Simons, and Roselyn Sánchez, among others. Celebs honored at the Do Something Awards include: Patrick Dempsey, Jesse Tyler Ferguson, Jennifer Hudson, LL Cool J, and Kelly Osbourne. Performances were made by: Fitz and the Tantrums, J. Cole, and Sara Bareilles.

=== Past award winners ===
- 1996 - Van Jones: Founded and directed the San Francisco-based Bay Area Police Watch, an organization that assists survivors of police misconduct and brutality. In 1996, Van founded the Ella Baker Center for Human Rights. Named for a civil rights activist Ella Baker, the Center "promotes alternatives to violence and incarceration".
- 1998 - Mark Levine: Founded Credit Where Credit Is Due and Neighborhood Trust Federal Credit Union, to help low-income families in Northern Manhattan in New York City gain access to and control over financial services.
- 2005 - Students for Organ Donation: Founder Richard Ludlow started this non-profit organization at Yale. It eventually spread to 20 universities and won a BRICK award in 2005.
- 2005 - Net Literacy: Founder Daniel Kent started Senior Connects (later renamed Net Literacy) in middle school and 4,500 student volunteers have donated 40,000 computers have increased access to technology to more than 250,000 individuals.
- 2006 - Jordan Schwartz age 12, receives a Do Something Brick Award as founder and artistic producer of The Children's Bilingual Theater which is committed to bridging the language and cultural gaps in our community through the theater and arts and is dedicated to giving a diverse group of young people the theater experience while offering the benefits of confidence and public speaking in a bilingual setting. www.childrensbilingualtheater.org
- 2007 - Jacob Komar: Created "Computers for Communities", which obtains discarded computers, teaches prison inmates how to refurbish them and distributes them to locals in need of a computer. This program has distributed more than 1,000 computers and Jacob plans to expand his services.
- 2007 - Kimmie Weeks: Created Youth Action International, which rebuilds war-torn African communities. Thousands of children in post-war African countries have benefited from YAI's centers, micro-credit loans, scholarships, peace schools, playgrounds, and agriculture programs.
- 2008 - Chad Bullock: Trained 45,000 teens to do anti-tobacco projects and has developed an anti-tobacco activism site helloCHANGE.org
- 2009 - Maggie Doyne: Opened and manages the Kopila Valley Primary School with her life savings. As of 2011, 35 children live in the orphanage and over 230 children attend the school.
- 2010 - Jessica Posner: Co-founded Shining Hope for Communities to combat gender inequality and poverty in Kibera. As the first free school in Kibera, Jessica has helped over 5,700 residents gain education and employment.
- 2011 - Sarah Cronk: Founder of The Sparkle Effect, an innovative student-run program encouraging teens nationwide to include disabled students in high school cheerleading programs. The goal of the program is to enable disabled students to experience true acceptance and gain confidence as high school students and to inspire entire communities to embrace inclusion.
- 2012 - Katia Gomez: Provides education to the youth of Honduras through her foundation Educate2Envision, which also helps show the opportunities that education can bring.
- 2013 - Daniel Maree: Founded the Million Hoodies Movement for Justice, which helps combat the issues of racial profiling and Florida's Stand Your Ground Law in the wake of the death of 17-year-old Trayvon Martin.

== 2020 Racial bias accusations and staff walkout ==
In June 2020, former DoSomething staffers tweeted accusations about racial discrimination and toxic work culture at DoSomething and its sister organization Crisis Text Line. The CEO of Crisis Text Line, Nancy Lublin, was fired alongside two members of the Crisis Text Line Board of Directors. The accusations resulted in calls for the resignation of DoSomething CEO Aria Finger for her alleged complicity in and failure to address the toxic work culture. Finger took a leave of absence in June but was reinstated in late August following an independent investigation's conclusion that there was no explicit racism at the nonprofit. This prompted half of DoSomething's staff to walk out on September 8, refusing to work until Finger resigned. They cited that the independent report did not address the accusations in good faith, that the report was not released to staff, and that it focused mainly on explicit racial bias even though the accusations spoke primarily of implicit racial bias.

In April 2021, DoSomething announced the appointment of a new CEO, DeNora Getachew. According to the press statement, Getachew will "work to foster a high-performing anti-racist and inclusive culture based on trust and collaboration."

== See also ==
- Feed the Deed
- Free Money Day
- List of awards for volunteerism and community service
