= Image consulting =

Professional field

Image consulting is a professional service that advises individuals or organizations on appearance, behavior, communication, and presentation. Image consultants may advise on clothing, personal style, colours, grooming, etiquette, body language, public speaking style, and personal branding.

Image consultants are usually experts in marketing and fashion, or more precisely — PR; they deal with improving of the image of their clients for social events or to achieve certain goals. Not only individuals but also companies can be clients of image consultants, although main clients remain executives and politicians. An image consultant's main focus is on dressing, personal style, clothes buying, body language, and etiquette, taking a customer through a process of evaluating their lifestyle and helping them change their body language and attire in order to help improve their image.

== History ==
The term "image consulting" became associated with professional and workplace appearance advice in the 1970s. John T. Molloy's 1975 book Dress for Success popularized the idea that clothing and personal presentation could affect professional outcomes. The book was not based on the author's opinion, but on tests conducted on subjects and helped spread the power dressing concept. At this time, the public increased its interest in how clothing affects one's goals, and the book was an international success.

In the eighties, a few firms started offering image consulting services specifically for events. Eventually, celebrities started hiring them for their everyday styling and life. Rachel Zoe, a fashion stylist and image consultant, became a fashion icon for styling celebrities. The Conselle Institute of Image Management was founded over 40 years ago. In 1990, the Association of Image Consultants International (AICI) was born, with more than 1,300 members today.

== Scope and services ==
Image consultants advise individuals or organizations on appearance, communication, and presentation. Services may include advice on clothing, colours, hairstyles, make-up, wardrobe organization, styling for events, public speaking style, body language, personal branding, corporate culture, and business etiquette..

== Related occupations ==
Image consulting overlaps with personal styling, fashion consulting, wardrobe consulting, and public relations. It is distinct from photographic styling, where stylists prepare clothes, accessories, props, backgrounds, and models for photo or video shoots according to a creative brief.

== Training and professional organizations ==
Training routes for image consultants vary by country and provider. Skills Development Scotland states that formal qualifications are not required for entry into image consulting, although relevant backgrounds may include beauty therapy, hairdressing, retailing, marketing, and business.

== See also ==
- Wardrobe stylist
- Public relations
- Personal stylist
- Personal shopper
- Color analysis
- Etiquette
- Nonverbal communication
- Personal branding
