= Wingman Project =

The Wingman Project (formerly Wingman For Life) is a layperson, peer-to-peer suicide intervention program that shows U.S. military members and their families how to intervene to save a life. By promoting a Wingman Ethos, whereby military families and members take personal accountability for the well being of each other, communities can help strengthen the bonds that exist between veterans, their families, and ordinary citizens. Funded nationally in the U.S., the Wingman Project is executed state-by-state through a combined effort of chaplains, family support, safety, and other related support functions at local Air National Guard (ANG) units.

== About the Wingman Project ==
The Wingman Project is designed to decrease military suicides through human intervention in crisis events, referral to competent professional authority, public outreach to increase awareness, and de-stigmatization of mental health care.

Originally created as "Wingman For Life" by Air National Guard Lieutenant Colonel Edward Vaughan in 2007, the Wingman Project is a "show, don't tell" suicide intervention program for military members. In this context, the term intervention is used as a distinct supplement to existing "prevention" programs. A string of suicides among Citizen-Airmen in the summer of 2007 created the sense of urgency to do something. At the same time, a public memo from the Chief of Staff of the Air Force (CSAF), Gen T. Michael Moseley, entitled "Wingmen for Life" inspired the name and leadership vector.

After consultation with military chaplains and health care providers, Vaughan adopted the Ask, Care, Escort (ACE) technique for the project as the primary intervention strategy for laypeople. ACE is a military variant of Dr. Paul Quinnett's Question, Persuade, Refer (QPR) methodology. In 2008, Wingman For Life expanded to all 50 U.S. states, three territories and the District of Columbia and officially became the Wingman Project.

In 2009, at the request of the vice commander, Air Force Reserve Command, Vaughan helped launch the Air Force Reserve Wingman Project, which later became the AFRC Wingman Toolkit. In 2010, Vaughan transferred leadership of the Wingman Project to the ANG Director of Safety Colonel John D. Slocum. In 2012, ANG Safety released a mobile Wingman App to complement the social media campaign of the Wingman Project.

== Project goal ==
The goal of the Wingman Project, and the tools associated therewith, is to teach military members, their friends, colleagues, and loved ones how to intervene to save a life. The life they save may be a fellow military member's, a veteran's, a loved one's, or even their own. Using a straightforward approach known as ACE, men and women in uniform will have the tools to intervene during a crisis in order to help a friend or loved one get the professional help needed.

This project was developed with the assistance of the QPR Institute but did not receive its approval or endorsement. The impact and effectiveness of the QPR Institute's original gatekeeper training program (QPR Gatekeeper Training for Suicide Prevention) is supported by more than 20 years of independent and federally-funded university research, as referenced in dozens of publications in scientific journals. The Wingman's Ask, Care, Escort (ACE) variation is not the same in curriculum, training requirements, or protocol.

== See also ==
- American Foundation for Suicide Prevention
- National Suicide Prevention Lifeline
- United States military veteran suicide epidemic
