= United States military veteran suicide =

Suicide among veterans of the United States armed forces

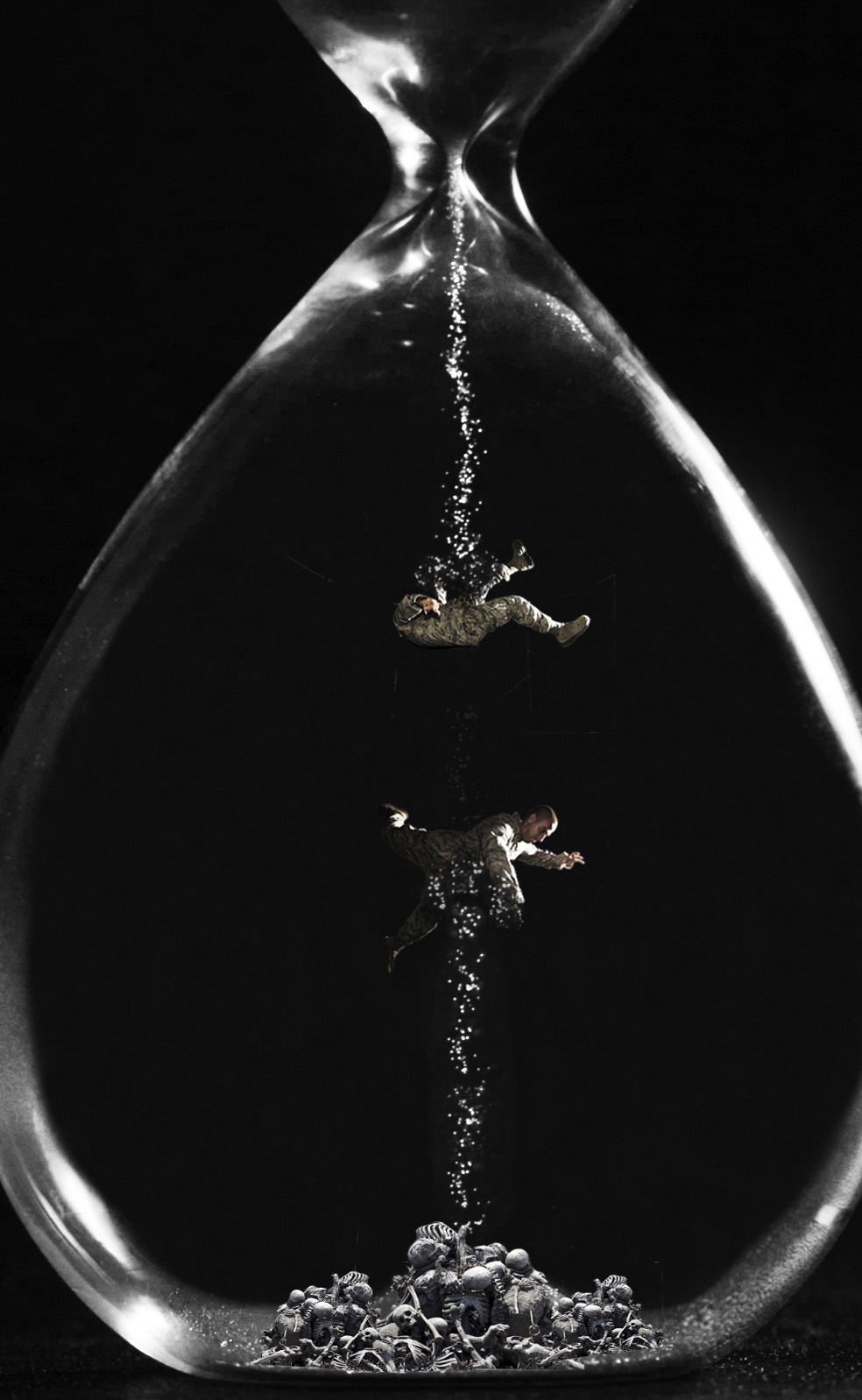
An illustration created by the U.S. Air Force to represent the number of veteran suicides per day.

United States military veteran suicide is an ongoing phenomenon regarding the high rate of suicide among U.S. military veterans in comparison to the general civilian public. A focus on preventing veteran suicide began in 1958 with the opening of the first suicide prevention center in the United States. During the mid-1990s, a paradigm shift in addressing veteran suicide occurred with the development of a national strategy which included several Congressional Resolutions. More advancements were made in 2007, when the Joshua Omvig Veterans Suicide Prevention Act created a comprehensive program including outreach at each Veterans Affairs Office (VA) and the implementation of a 24-hour crisis hotline (the Veterans Crisis Line). PTSD, depression, and combat-related guilt in veterans are often related to suicide. It is hard for veterans to transition into civilian life because they are used to structured routines everyday while being in the military.

== Background information ==
In 2012 alone, an estimated 7,500 former military personnel died by suicide. More active duty service members, 177, died from suicide that year than were killed in combat, 176. The Army had 52% of the suicides from all branches.

In 2013, the United States Department of Veteran Affairs released a study that covered suicides from 1999 to 2010, which showed that roughly 22 veterans were committing suicide per day, or one every 65 minutes. Some sources suggest that this rate may be undercounting suicides. An analysis done in 2013 found a suicide rate among veterans of about 30 per 100,000 population per year, compared with the civilian rate of 14 per 100,000. However, the comparison was not adjusted for age and sex.

According to a report published by the United States Department of Veterans Affairs (VA) in 2016, which analyzed 55 million veterans' records from 1979 to 2014, the current analysis indicates that an average of 20 veterans die from suicide per day.

A study released in 2022 found that as many as 44 veterans die on average per day from suicide when accounting overlooked causes of death that are aligned with suicidal and self harm behavior, which is 2.4 times greater than the official estimate.

A 2021 study by Brown University estimated that 30,177 veterans of post-9/11 conflicts had died by suicide. When compared to the 7,057 personnel killed in the conflicts, at least four times as many veterans died by suicide than personnel were killed during the post-9/11 conflicts.

According to a 2022 report by the Iraq and Afghanistan Veterans of America, nearly half of U.S. military service members have seriously considered suicide since joining the Armed Forces.

A 2023 study led by the University of Texas at San Antonio examined suicide among veterans of post-9/11 conflicts. The study found that veterans that experienced traumatic brain injuries had higher suicide rates than veterans did not. It also found that the highest rates of veteran suicide were among those aged 35 to 44, those aged 25 to 34, Native Americans, Asian and Pacific Islanders, and veterans with traumatic brain injuries. It additionally concluded that suicide among post-9/11 veterans had increased since 2018. It was theorized by the researchers that this increase was due to causes such as increased diagnoses of mental health conditions, substance abuse, and the availability of firearms. Firearms are the most commonly used suicide method among veterans.

The total number of suicides differs by age group; 31% of these suicides were by veterans 49 and younger while 69% were by veterans aged 50 and older. As with suicides in general, suicide of veterans is primarily male, with about 97 percent of the suicides being male in the states that reported gender. In addition to differences among age and gender groups, there has also been found to be significant disparity in suicidal ideation and completion rates among marginalized groups such as LGBT military members. Suicidal ideation was found to be 2-3 times greater in LGBT active-duty and veteran service members, with transgender veterans having been found to commit suicide at double the rates of their cisgender peers.

In 2015, the Clay Hunt Veterans Suicide Prevention Act passed in the Senate and was then enacted as Pub. L. 114–2 (text) (PDF) on February 12, 2015. It requires the Secretary of Veterans Affairs to organize an annual third-party evaluation of the VA's mental health care and suicide prevention programs, to mandate website updates at least once every 90 days about the VA's mental health care services, to offer educational incentives for psychiatrists who commit to serving in the Veterans Health Administration (VHA), to collaborate with nonprofit mental health organizations with the goal of preventing veteran suicide, and to extend veterans' eligibility for VA hospital care, medical service care, and nursing home care. However, the limitations of this act are very restricting. Veterans can only access extended eligibility if they have been discharged or released from active duty between the years of 2009 and 2011 and if they have not enrolled in care during the five years following their discharge.

Annual number of suicides per 100,000 population. 2000–2010.
	Never served in military	Veterans and active service
Women	5.2	28.7
Men	20.9	32.1

In August 2016, the VA released another report which consisted of the nation's largest analysis of veteran suicide. The report reviewed more than 55 million veterans' records from 1979 to 2014 from every state in the nation. The previous report from 2012 was primarily limited to data on veterans who used VHA health services or from mortality records obtained directly from 20 states and approximately 3 million records. Compared to the data from the 2012 report, which estimated the number of Veteran deaths by suicide to be 22 per day, the current analysis indicates that in 2014, an average of 20 veterans a day died from suicide.

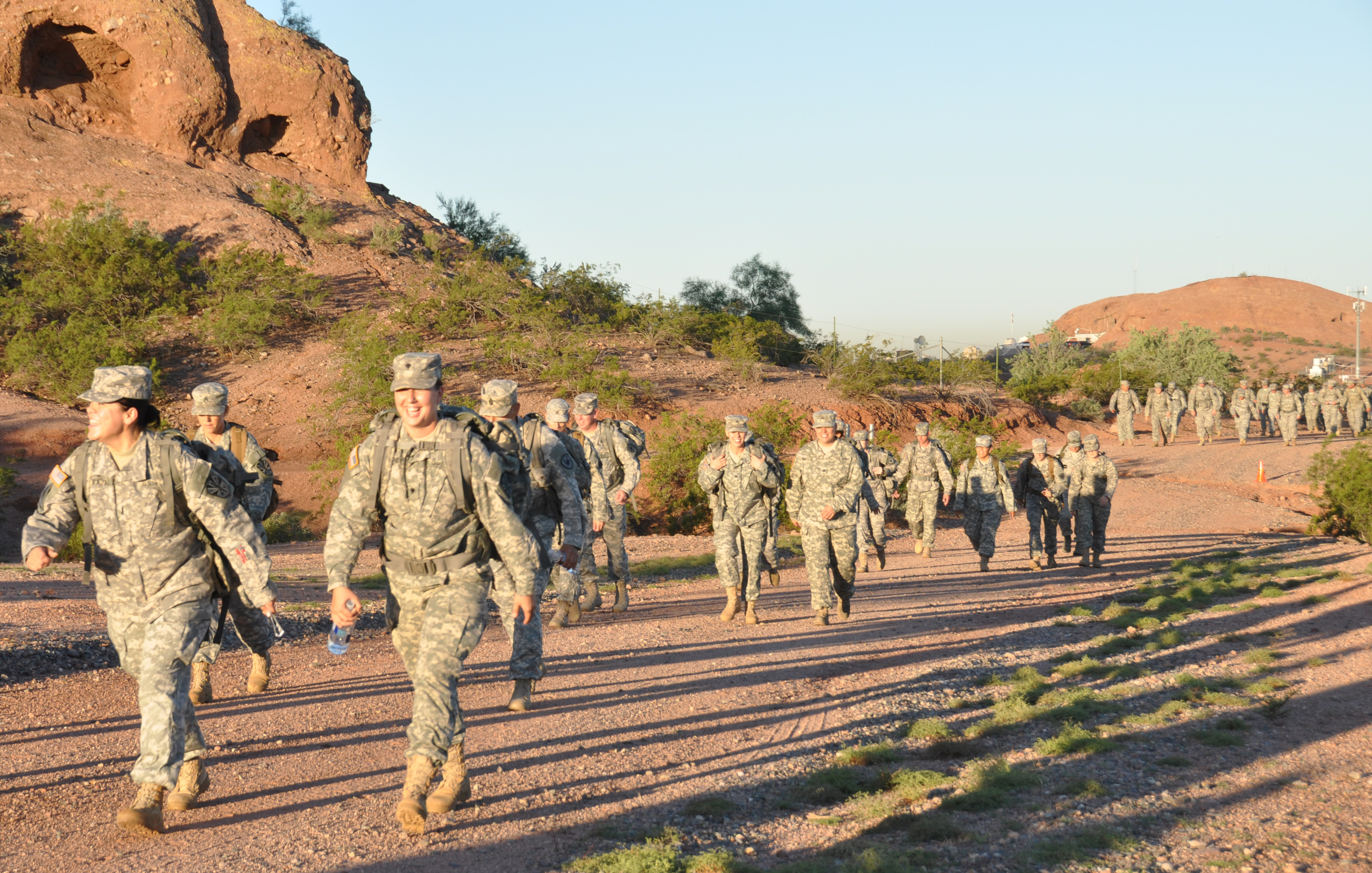
Arizona Army and Air National Guard members participating in "Ruck for Life," an event promoting military suicide prevention, 2014.

In 2019, the VA released its National Veteran Suicide Prevention Annual Report, which stated that the suicide rate for veterans was 1.5 times the rate of non-veteran adults. The report established that there were 6000 or more veteran suicides per year from 2008 to 2017. The report also stated that veterans consist of 13.5% of all deaths by suicide in US adults but only make up 7.9% of the US adult population.

In May 2019, President Donald Trump signed an executive order, called the PREVENTS Initiative, to counter veteran suicide. The initiative aims to equip state and local governments with the resources necessary to identify and intervene in scenarios where United States Veterans may be at risk to suicide. In the past, the Veteran's Administration and other federal agencies relied upon the veteran to self-identify when needing help. $73.1 billion was secured for veteran health services. Included in the $73.1 billion funding is $18.6 billion towards mental health services.

In November 2019, the House of Representatives discussed a potential program that would provide grants to local organizations that support veterans who are possibly overlooked by the Department of Veterans Affairs. The motivation behind targeting this demographic of overlooked veterans is that statistically, 14 out of the 20 estimated veterans and current service members who die from suicide every day are not in regular communication with the department of Veterans Affairs (VA). This proposal, pushed by the VA, was for a test program that was to last three years. However, this idea languished in Congress despite some bipartisan support.

== Social policy: history of veteran suicide prevention ==
The first suicide prevention center in the United States was opened in Los Angeles in 1958 with funding from the U.S. Public Health Service. In 1966, the Center for Studies of Suicide Prevention (later the Suicide Research Unit) was established at the National Institute of Mental Health (NIMH) of the National Institutes of Health (NIH). Later on, in 1970, the NIMH pushed in Phoenix the discussion about the status of suicide prevention, presented relevant findings about suicide rate and identified the future directions and priorities of the topic.

However, it wasn't until mid-1990s when suicide started being the central issue of the political-social agenda of the United States. Survivors from suicide began to mobilize encouraging the development of a national strategy for suicide prevention. Two Congressional Resolutions—S. Res. 84 and H. Res. 212 of the 105th Congress—recognized suicide as a national problem and suicide prevention as a national priority.

As recommended in the U.N. guidelines, these groups set out to establish a public and private partnership that would be responsible for promoting suicide prevention in the United States. This partnership jointly sponsored a national consensus conference on suicide prevention in Reno, Nevada, which developed a list of 81 recommendations.

=== Key points from Reno, Nevada conference ===
1. Suicide prevention must recognize and affirm the value, dignity, and importance of each person.
2. Suicide is not solely the result of illness or inner conditions. The feelings of hopelessness that contribute to suicide can stem from societal conditions and attitudes. Therefore, everyone concerned with suicide prevention shares a responsibility to help change attitudes and eliminate the conditions of oppression, racism, homophobia, discrimination, and prejudice.
3. Some groups are disproportionately affected by these societal conditions, and some are at greater risk for suicide.
4. Individuals, communities, organizations, and leaders at all levels should collaborate to promote suicide prevention.
5. The success of this strategy ultimately rests with individuals and communities across the United States.

=== Federal policy initiatives ===
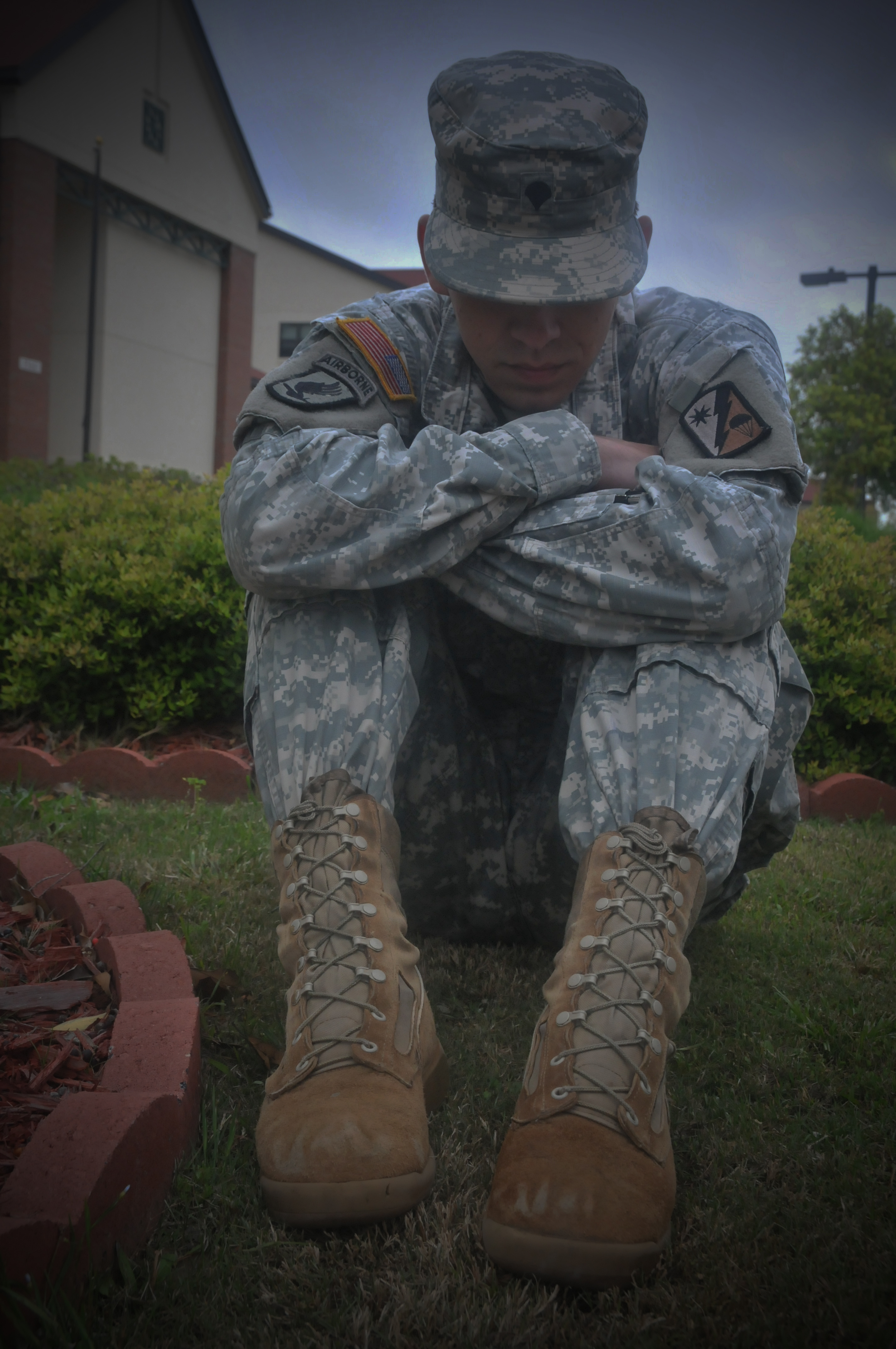
Photo created May 2013 and taken by Sgt. Amanda Tucker in Fort Bragg, NC as part of a project to raise awareness about the Veterans Crisis Line.

One of the first pieces of legislation to directly address Veterans' Suicide Prevention was the Joshua Omvig Veterans Suicide Prevention Act (JOVSPA) of 2007, supporting the creation of a comprehensive program to reduce the incidence of suicide among veterans. Named for a veteran of Operation Iraqi Freedom who died by suicide in 2005, the act directed the Secretary of the U.S. Department of Veterans Affairs (VA) to implement a comprehensive suicide prevention program for veterans. Components include staff education, mental health assessments as part of overall health assessments, a suicide prevention coordinator at each VA medical facility, research efforts, 24-hour mental health care, a toll-free crisis line, and outreach to and education for veterans and their families. In the summer of 2009, VA added a one-to-one "chat service" for veterans who prefer to reach out for assistance using the Internet.

In 2010, the National Action Alliance for Suicide Prevention was created and, in 2012, the National Strategy was revised. With Obama's administration suicide prevention strategies for veterans expanded and a goal was formed to make the process of finding and obtaining mental health resources easier for veterans, work to retain and recruit mental health professionals, and make the government programs more accountable for the people they serve.

On August 31, 2012, President Barack Obama signed Executive Order (EO) 13625 titled "Improving Access to Mental Health Services for Veterans, Service Members, and Military Families". The EO calls on the cooperation of the Departments of Defense, Veterans Affairs, and local communities to improve their mental health care services for military service members, especially during their transition into civilian life. The EO is written specifically to expand veteran suicide prevention and drug abuse efforts. Not only does it demand the Veteran Crisis Line's capacity be expanded by 50% by December 31, 2012, it also demands the VHA to connect any veteran in mental health crisis to a mental health professional or trained mental health worker within 24 hours of contacting the Veteran Crisis Line. In conjunction, this EO calls on the Departments of Veterans Affairs and Defense to work together to launch a year-long veteran suicide prevention campaign starting September 1, 2012 to encourage veterans to proactively reach out for mental health services.

=== Suicide prevention hotline ===
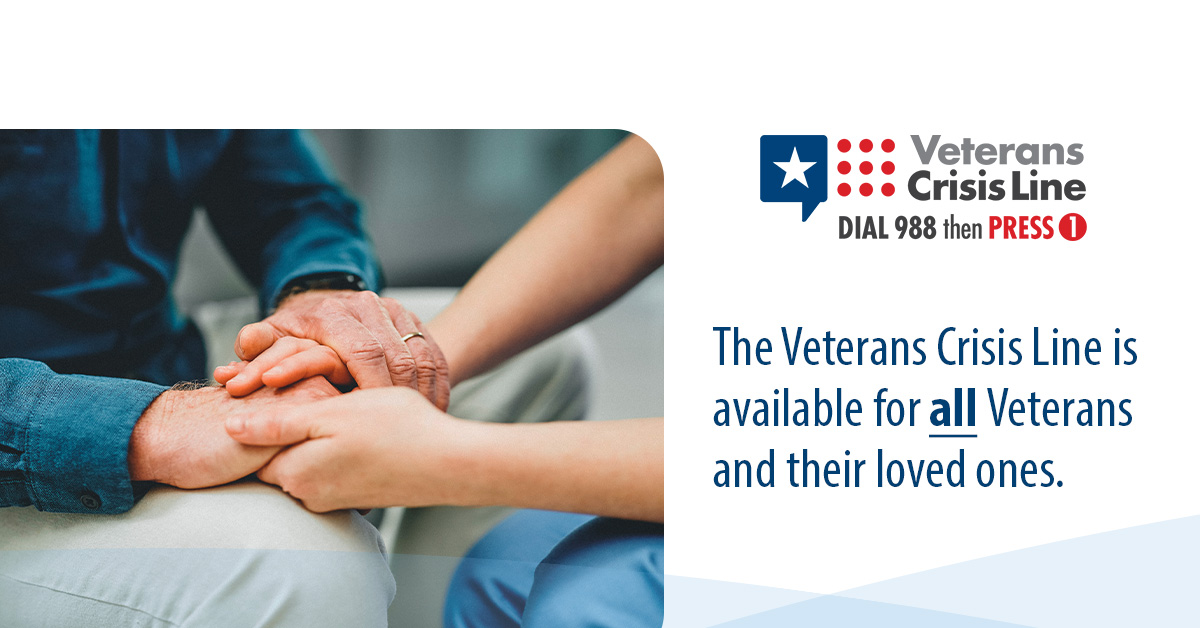
A graphic created by VA to spread awareness of the Veterans Crisis Line.

The primary mission of the Veterans Crisis Line (VCL) is to provide confidential suicide prevention and crisis intervention services to veterans, active-duty service members, national guard/reserve members, and their families. The VCL is available 24/7 and can be reached via phone call, text message, or anonymous online chat. At its three call centers, the VCL maintains a qualified staff of responders who are ready to help veterans deal with their personal crises. Responders must make an accurate assessment of the needs of each caller under stressful, time-sensitive conditions.

"Since its launch in 2007, the Veterans Crisis Line has answered nearly 4.4 million calls and initiated the dispatch of emergency services to callers in crisis more than 138,000 times. The Veterans Crisis Line anonymous online chat service, added in 2009, has engaged in more than 511,000 chats. In November 2011, the Veterans Crisis Line introduced a text-messaging service to provide another way for Veterans to connect with confidential, round-the-clock support and since then has responded to more than 150,000 texts."

The phone number for the Veterans Crisis Line was changed to 988 in July 2022. It was anticipated that calls to the crisis line would increase in the following years due to this.

== Federal budget ==
The VA federal budget has continued to maintain an upward trend for the last twenty years. Within the last decade alone, between 2010 and 2020, the VA budget has increased by 73.1% from $127.1 billion to $220.2 billion in total funding. One major health care provision within these budgets has been increased funding for mental health services and suicide prevention. In 2012, the proposed budget allocated $6.2 billion for mental health and $68 million for suicide prevention. In the approved 2020 VA budget, mental health services received $9.4 billion in funding while $222 million was devoted to suicide prevention. This yearly increase in funding is expected to continue, the 2021 budget proposal is requesting $243 billion in total funding with a $10.3 billion allocation to mental health services. Increases in funding have also been accompanied by expanded services within recent federal budgets. The 2018 federal budget expanded mental health screenings for veterans. This expansion includes required mental health screenings for all veterans with other-than-honorable-discharges prior to separation, and guaranteed mental health support for veterans who have experienced trauma while serving.

== Causes ==
A study published in the Cleveland Clinic Journal of Medicine found that,

Combat veterans are not only more likely to have suicidal ideation, often associated with posttraumatic stress disorder (PTSD) and depression, but they are more likely to act on a suicidal plan. Especially since veterans may be less likely to seek help from a mental health professional, non-mental health physicians are in a key position to screen for PTSD, depression, and suicidal ideation in these patients.

The same study also found that in veterans with PTSD related to combat experience, combat-related guilt may be a significant predictor of suicidal ideation and attempts.

Craig Bryan of the University of Utah National Center for Veterans Studies said that veterans have the same risk factors for suicide as the general population, including feelings of depression, hopelessness, post-traumatic stress disorder, a history of trauma, and access to firearms.

Longer deployments increase the risk of divorce. When a soldier is divorced, it is nearly always soon after the end of their deployment.

A study done by the Department of Veterans Affairs discovered that veterans are more likely to develop symptoms of PTSD for a number of reasons such as:

- Longer times at war
- Lower level of education
- More severe combat conditions
- Other soldiers around them killed
- Brain/head trauma
- Female gender
- Life lasting physical injuries
- Military structure

The Department of Veterans Affairs also discovered that where a soldier was deployed and which branch of military they were with could also have drastic effects on their mental status after returning from service. As in most combat wars, their experiences would vary depending on where they were stationed.

Combat Stressors		Seeing dead bodies	Being shot at	Being attacked/ ambushed	Receiving rocket or mortar fire	Knowing someone killed/ seriously injured
Iraq	Army	95%	93%	89%	86%	86%
Iraq	Marines	94%	97%	95%	92%	87%
Afghanistan	Army	39%	66%	58%	84%	43%

The findings do not support an association between deployment and suicide mortality among all 3.9 million US military personnel who served during Operation Enduring Freedom or Operation Iraqi Freedom, including suicides that occurred after separation.

Anyone can develop PTSD at any age. A number of factors can increase the chance that someone will have PTSD, many of which are not under that person's control. For example, having a very intense or long-lasting traumatic event or getting injured during the event can make it more likely that a person will develop PTSD. PTSD is also more common after certain types of trauma, like combat and sexual assault. Personal factors, like previous traumatic exposure, age, and gender, can affect whether or not a person will develop PTSD. What happens after the traumatic event is also important. Stress can make PTSD more likely, while social support can make it less likely.

— U.S. Department of Veterans Affairs, https://www.ptsd.va.gov/understand/what/ptsd_basics.asp

== Protective factors ==
Veterans can have difficulty transitioning from the military to civilian life. Many use their G.I. Bill or other education benefits; this can facilitate the transition to civilian life. Veterans pursuing education, especially those utilizing the post 9/11 GI Bill, are more likely to have protective factors related to socialization and reintegration.

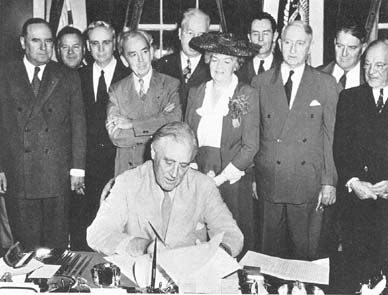
President Franklin D. Roosevelt signs the G.I. Bill into law on June 22, 1944. This provided veterans with funds for college education, low-interest loans, unemployment insurance, and living expenses.

However, the pursuit of education can also aggravate post-service conditions linked to a higher likelihood of suicide. These conditions include:

- Difficulty relating to fellow students
- Difficulty in coping with military experiences in an academic environment
- Lack of support or understanding for service connected disabilities
- Negative stigmas related to military service
- Feelings of isolation
- Feelings of separation
- Lack of social support
- Difficulty with stable or reliable income
- Difficulty with stable housing

Despite these challenges, veterans often benefit from transitioning from the military into higher education. Academic life often requires student veterans to work and interact with other classmates. Many academic institutions have student veteran organizations and resources centers specifically to aid military veterans. Military education benefits often utilized by veterans include the Post 9/11 GI Bill, Montgomery GI Bill and Vocational Rehabilitation and Employment. These benefits cover tuition expenses up to a capped amount per academic year depending on benefit utilized. In addition, a stipend for books, supplies and housing is also provided within these benefits. Education benefits often give veteran students an income, a goal to continue to work towards and socialization with the general population.

Suicide rates for veterans are on a slight downward trend. Veterans generally have access to mental healthcare, and some branches take more proactive measures to reduce stigma and promote mental well-being, but the approach is inconsistent. It can be a challenge to obtain mental healthcare prior to discharge and to find individualized treatment. Mental health facilities, primary care providers and the Veterans Association do not always coordinate. Nationwide, there is a trend toward a broader spectrum treatment approach. The sustainability of long-term treatment plans may depend on communicating options about available treatment types, enabling veterans to access treatment, convincing them that it is socially acceptable to ask for help, eliminating stigma, and giving them a purpose to succeed.

Many non-profit organizations exist to promote awareness in local communities, such as Wingman Project and 22Kill. In 2013, 22Kill was started as a social media campaign to raise awareness about the staggering Veteran suicide statistics. By 2015, 22Kill had established itself as a 501c non-profit organization and soon after launched the viral #22Pushup Challenge. This movement helped them raise over half a million dollars and brought widespread attention to the Veteran suicide epidemic. During this time, 22Kill transitioned from awareness campaigns to suicide prevention offering a multitude of programs. These include clinical programs, non-traditional therapies along with family and community programs.

== See also ==
- Veterans Crisis Line
- Suicide in the United States § Military
- United States Department of Veterans Affairs
- Suicide in the military
- Wingman Project
- 22Kill
