= Andre Rush =

American chef

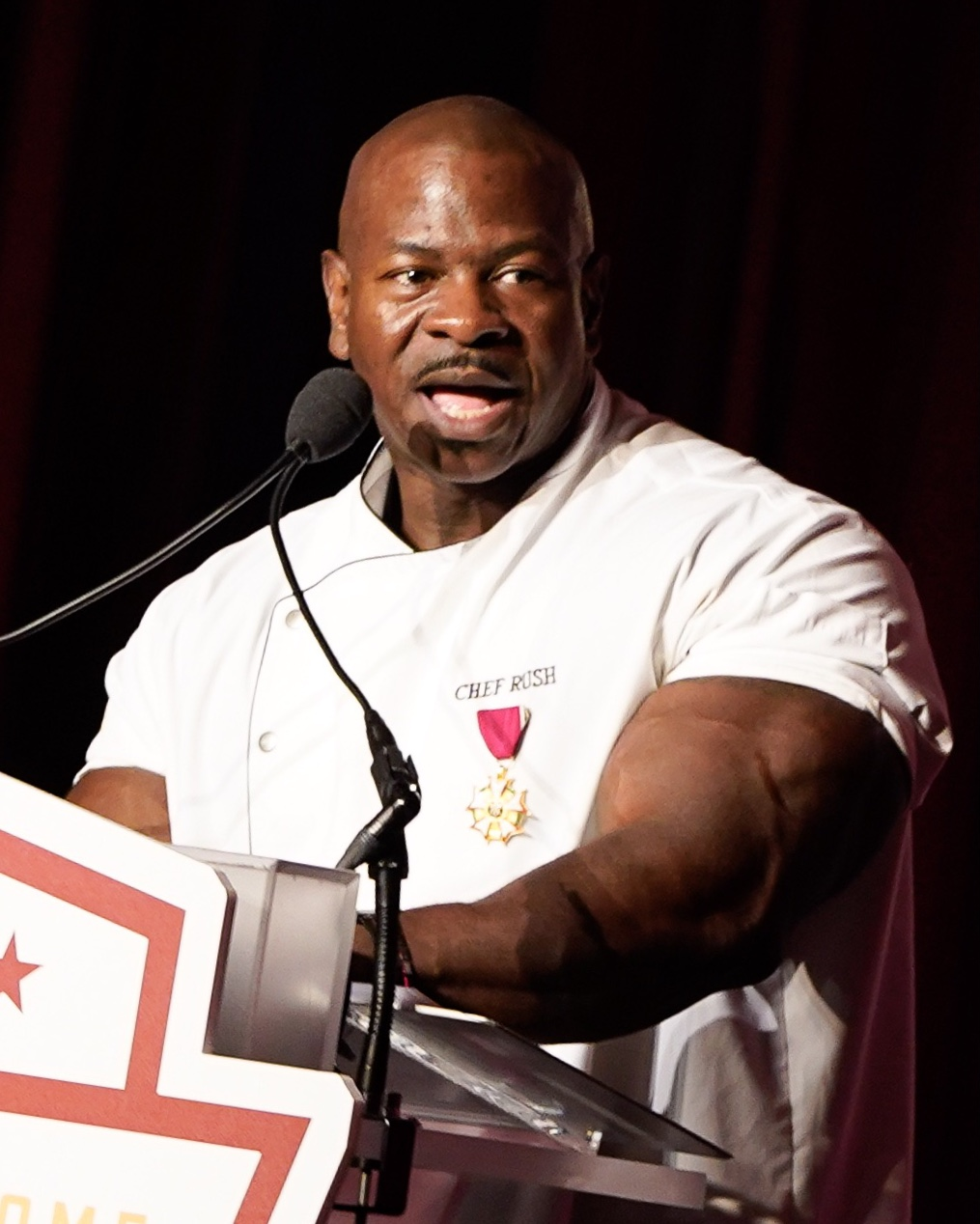
- Rush speaking at the Washington Redskins 58th annual Welcome Home Luncheon in 2019
- Born: Andre Rush; September 7, 1974 (age 52); Columbus, Mississippi, U.S.
- Education: Trident University International; Central Texas College
- Occupations: Celebrity chef, Youtuber
- Years active: 1993–present
- Known for: Chef in the United States Military; Member of the United States Culinary Arts Team
- Height: 179 cm (5 ft 10 in)

YouTube information
- Channel: Chef Rush
- Subscribers: 9.51 million
- Views: 5.03 billion
- Website: chefrush.com

Andre Rush (born September 7, 1974) is an American celebrity chef and military veteran. He worked in the White House as a Chef for four administrations. Rush, a retired Master Sergeant of the U.S. Army, gained additional attention for his large biceps and muscular physique.

== Biography ==
=== Early life and education ===
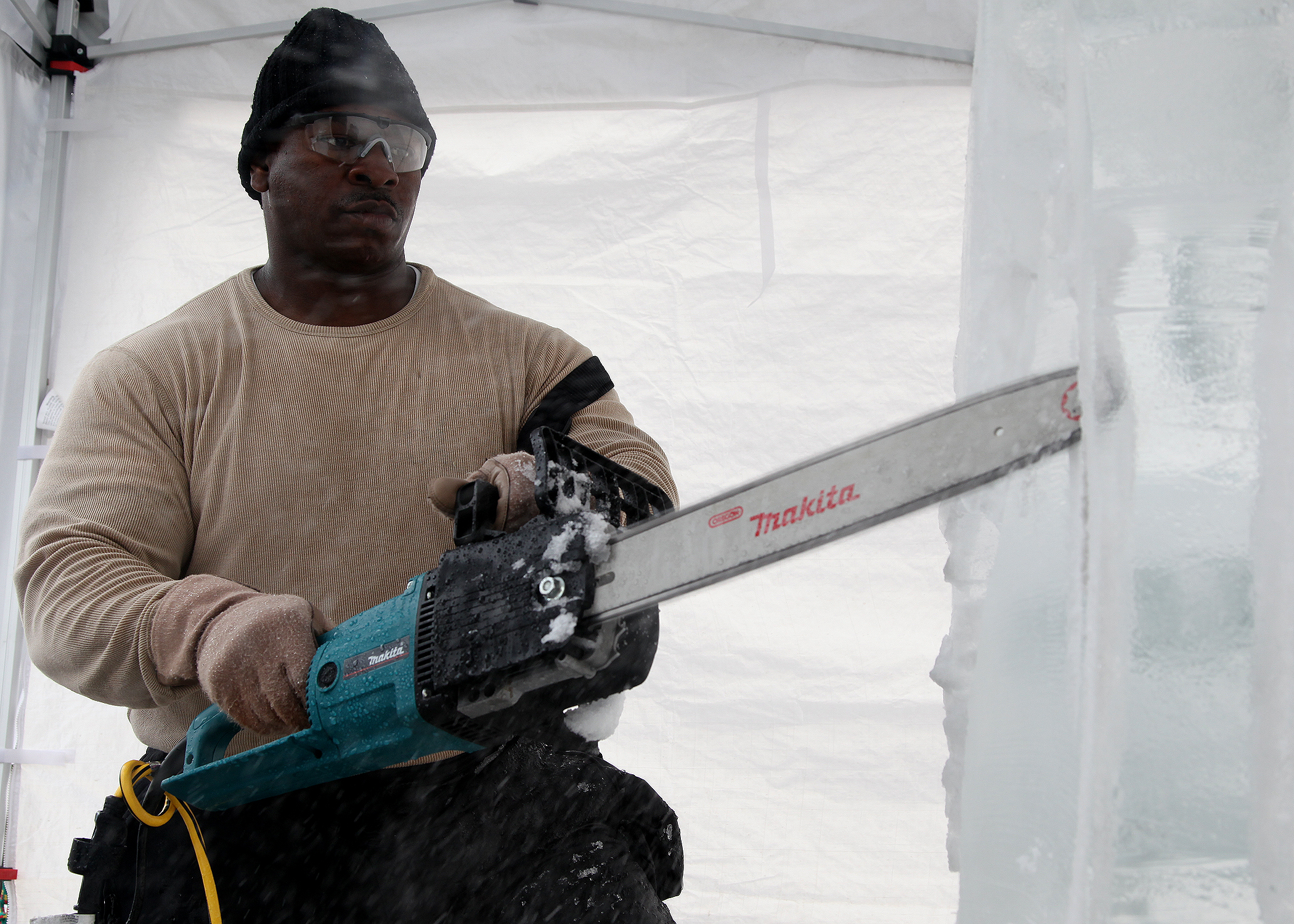
Rush at the 35th U.S. Army Culinary Arts Competition

Rush grew up in Columbus, Mississippi. He played football in the position of running back at Lee High School in Columbus. He holds a bachelor's degree in Business Management from Trident University International and an associate degree in Hotel Restaurant Management from Central Texas College.

=== Culinary career ===
Rush enlisted in the U.S. Army in 1993. He has been deployed overseas several times, and served as a trainer in hand-to-hand combat and food service. In 1997, Rush began to work as a chef at the White House. He has served the presidential administrations of Bill Clinton, George W. Bush, Barack Obama and the first administration of Donald Trump. He worked at the White House part-time while simultaneously working at The Pentagon. He was in the gym of the Pentagon when it was hit during the September 11, 2001 attacks, and chose to volunteer for combat duties afterwards. Rush was a member of the U.S. Army Culinary Arts Team.

In June 2018, Rush received fame when he was photographed by CNN reporter Kate Bennett and Wall Street Journal reporter Vivian Salama preparing a Ramadan meal for a White House dinner. The photo of him cooking on the White House lawn during the annual White House Iftar dinner circulated on Twitter, and subsequently went viral. Later that year, he signed a deal to produce a television show entitled Chef in the City. He has since left his job as a White House chef.

In 2020, Rush attended the opening of a Salvation Army in Harrisburg, Pennsylvania, whereupon they gave him a celebration of service award.

In 2023, Rush starred in Kitchen Commando, a show about helping struggling restaurants in the DMV Area. It was produced by Gordon Ramsay and premiered on Tubi. In 2024, he was featured in Culinary Class Wars, a South Korean cooking challenge show broadcast by Netflix. In his episode, he participated in a restaurant challenge amongst mukbang YouTubers. He also appeared on the MBC variety show If You Rest Well, That's Good. In September 2026, Rush joined HHS Secretary Robert F. Kennedy Jr.'s web series The Real Food Show, where he and Kennedy recreated fast-food menu items at home using healthy and affordable ingredients.

=== Fitness ===
Rush is known for his physique, in particular the 24-inch arms that earned him fame on social media. As a high school senior he reportedly could bench press 350 pounds (160 kg) while weighing just 150 pounds (68 kg). In 2010, he was reported to be able to bench press 605 pounds (274 kg). Rush states he does 2,222 pushups daily as part of the 22 pushup challenge, with the goal to raise awareness for the roughly 22 veterans who die by suicide every day.

In 2021, Men's Health published an article featuring Rush's daily routine, which included him eating eight meals a day and up to 10,000 calories. He also claimed to have never consumed anabolic-androgenic steroids.

== Personal life ==
Rush's older brother, Ricky, died of lung cancer in 2016. Rush has been outspoken about the necessity of cancer screening.

In addition to cooking, Rush's other pursuits include ice carving, motivational speaking and life coaching.
