= 22Kill =

Suicide prevention organisation

22Kill is a suicide prevention non-profit organization that predominantly focuses on preventing United States military veterans and first responders from committing suicide. It is composed of multiple programs that were created through partnerships with other non-profit organizations such as Carry The Load.

== History ==
22Kill is a suicide prevention non-profit organization that predominantly focuses on preventing United States military veterans and first responders from committing suicide. It is composed of multiple programs that were created through partnerships with other non-profit organizations such as Carry The Load. The organization uses the motto "One Tribe, One Fight", which reflects on the collective partnerships' goal to prevent veteran and first responder suicide and help veterans and first responders cope with issues that may lead to suicide. The organization's name was chosen to reflect on a 2012 statistic from the Veterans Affairs office, which stated that 22 veterans commit suicide on a daily basis. 22Kill raises awareness and empowers service member and first responder families through multiple traditional and non-traditional programs (Stay The Course, Forge, Wind Therapy, and W.A.T.C.H.). Members of "The Tribe" wear a black honor ring on their index finger as a solemn reminder of the mission of combating suicide and empowering heroes, both past and present.

Beginning as a social media campaign, 22Kill became a 501(c)(3) nonprofit organization in July 2015. In 2016, 22Kill's 22 Pushup Challenge went viral on social media and raised over half a million dollars. In 2017, the organization began offering mental wellness programs such as Stay The Course, Tribal Council, Forge, Wind Therapy, WATCH, and White Star Families.

== Donors ==
22Kill is supported by the United Way of Tarrant County, the Perot Foundation, the Thomas M., Helen and John P. Ryan Foundation, Bell Labs, and the Texas Veterans Commission Fund.
