= Kimmie Weeks =

Liberian human rights activist

Kimmie L. Weeks
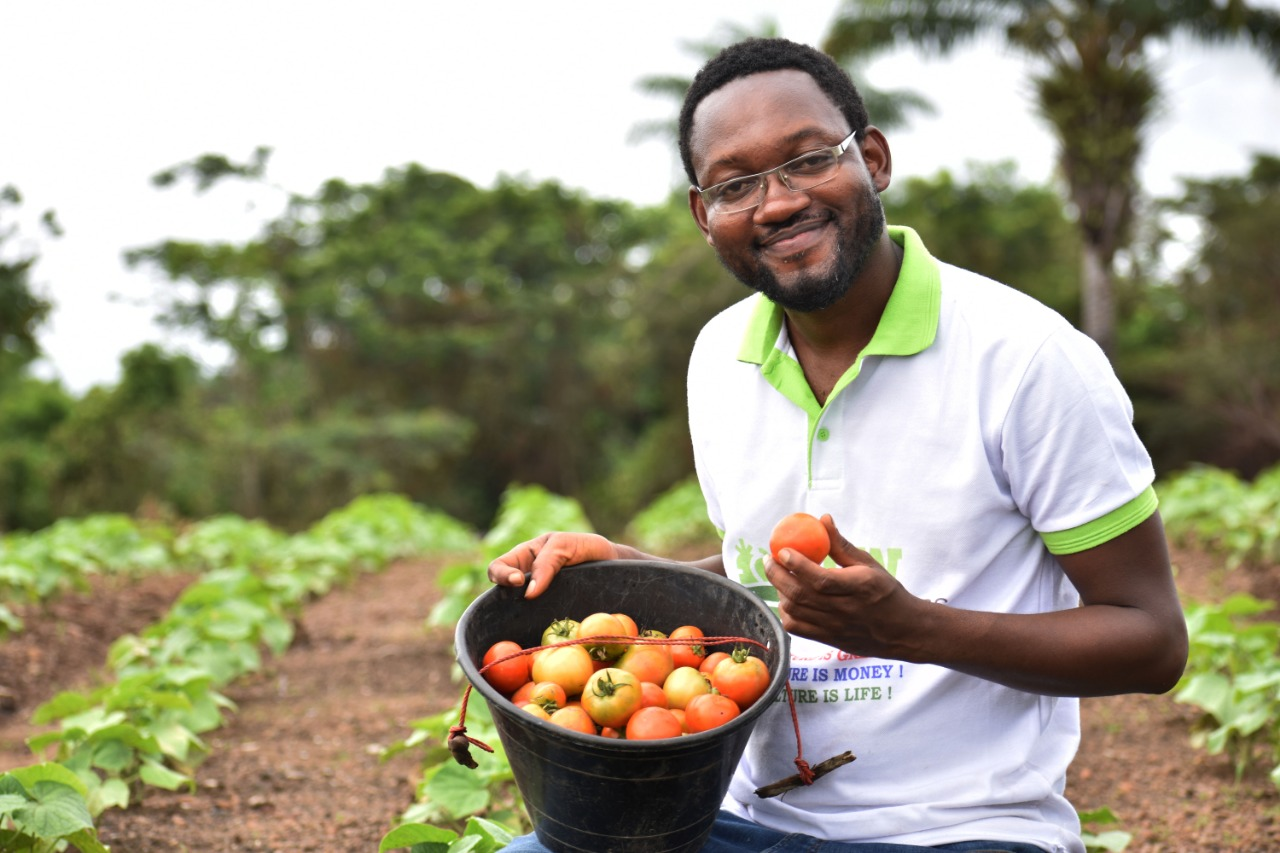
- Weeks in 2024
- Born: December 6, 1981 (age 44); Monrovia, Liberia
- Occupations: Human Rights Activist, Inspirational Speaker, Executive Director - Youth Action International, Chairman of the Board - Liberia Water & Sewer Corporation, Corporate Communications Strategist - Cellcom
- Writing career
- Notable awards: Brick Awards, Humane Order of African Redemption, National Excellence Award Doctor of Humane Letters
- Website: www.kimmieweeks.com

Kimmie Weeks (born December 6, 1981) is a Liberian human rights activist.

== Early years ==
Born in Monrovia, Liberia, in 1981, Weeks was nine years old when he experienced the First Liberian Civil War at first hand. He and his mother, Estina Ntow, were forced to leave their home and marched with many other displaced Liberians to a refugee camp set up in university buildings. A classroom filled to capacity with 30 people became his home. While in the camp, Weeks became deathly ill - dehydrated due to cholera, he also contracted chickenpox and yellow jaundice. He saw no doctor, no nurse and was administered no medicine except for a few herbs. When other refugees sharing the classroom with them could no longer find a pulse in Weeks, it was decided, over his mother's objections, that he had died. He was thrown still alive onto one of many piles of dead bodies in the refugee camp. Weeks's mother refused to accept that he was dead. She searched until she found his body and resuscitated him, beating on his chest and shaking him until he regained consciousness. That same night, Weeks vowed to dedicate the rest of his childhood and adult life to making the world a better place for children.

His early projects were small community-based initiatives, which he and groups of children his age carried out to help their own community. At the age of 14, he heard about the Convention on the Rights of the Child (CRC) for the first time and began to organize community initiatives to promote the CRC and the concept that "children should be seen AND heard."

== Initial projects ==
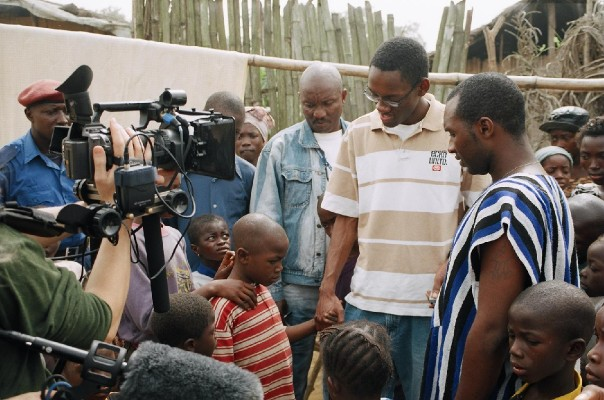
Kimmie Weeks visits internally displaced people camps in Sierra Leone.

Weeks co-founded Voice of the Future Inc. (VOF) in 1994 along with Richelieu Allison. The organization set its mission to work as an advocacy organization for the rights of children in Liberia. Over the years, it developed close connections with the United Nations and worked as an implementing partner for the United Nations Children's Fund (UNICEF). VOF provided informal health care and education to children across Liberia through a network of more than 4,000 volunteers.."

In 1996 Weeks, now 15, founded and chaired the Children's Disarmament Campaign. With support from UNICEF, the campaign lobbied a deadline for the disarmament of child soldiers, meeting warring faction, political, spiritual leaders and heads of civic societies to set a date for the disarmament of child soldiers. Several marches, indoor programs and publicity campaigns were also held to attract attention to the cause.

In 1997, with the holding of general disarmament in Liberia, Weeks established Liberia's first children's information service, The Children's Bureau of Information, which worked alongside Search for Common Ground/Talking Drum Studio to produce radio programs aimed at reintegrating child soldiers into the community. The 15-minute weekly broadcasts are aired on three local radio stations.

In 1998, the Liberian government of Charles Taylor made several attempts to assassinate Weeks because of a report he issued on the Liberian government's involvement in the training of child soldiers.

Fearing for his safety, Weeks went into hiding for more than three weeks before crossing into neighboring Ivory Coast under an assumed name and disguised as a traditional dancer. Only 17 years old when he fled his country, he was granted political asylum in the United States.

== Education and life in the United States ==
Once he arrived in the United States, Weeks enrolled and completed his final year of high school at Glasgow High School in Newark, Delaware. He then enrolled at Northfield Mount Hermon School in Northfield, MA, where he completed a post-graduate program. In 2001, he enrolled at Amherst College in Massachusetts and received a BA in Political Science and History in 2005. In 2008, he received his master's degree from the University of Pennsylvania and was subsequently awarded an Honorary Doctorate from Amherst College in 2012.

== Youth Action International ==
While at Amherst College, Weeks founded Youth Action International (YAI).

== Recognition and awards ==
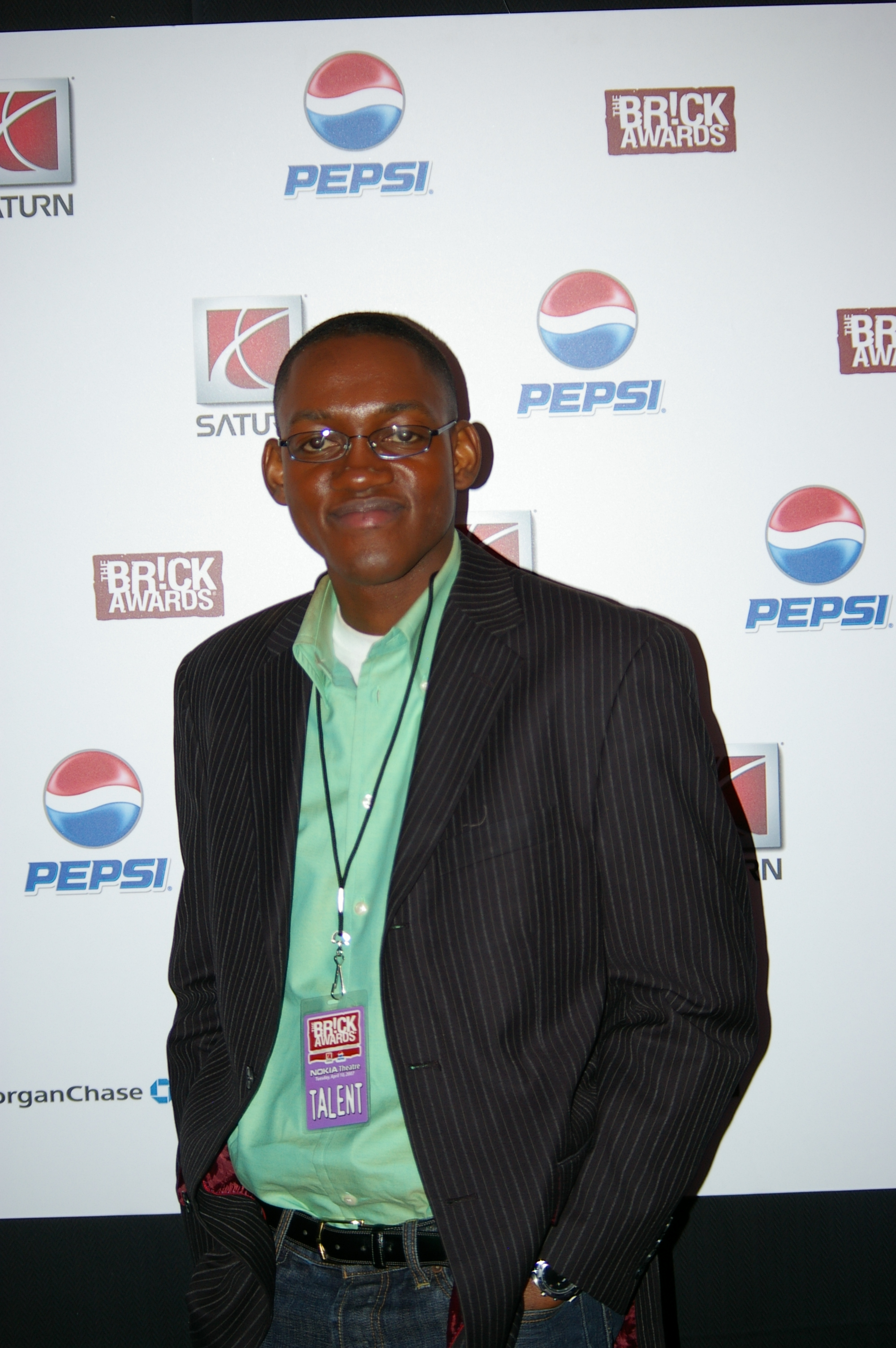
Weeks on the red carpet at the 2007 Brick Awards, the same night he won the Golden Brick Award.

Weeks remains a vocal advocate for children's rights around the world. His annual speaking tour reaches more than 40,000 people. He has also won the MLK Peace Medal, the 1998 Goodwill Games Medal for heroism in the face of adversity, and the 2007 Golden Brick Award.

On July 26, 2007, the President of Liberia Ellen Johnson Sirleaf awarded Weeks the Humane Order of African Redemption during programs marking Liberia's 160th Anniversary in Grand Bassa County, Liberia.

By Presidential request, Weeks also served as National Orator for programs marking Liberia's Independence Day Celebration. He spoke on the topic "Liberia at 160: Reclaiming the Future". The 30-minute speech, which was hailed by local newspapers as "one of the most powerful and moving speeches in Liberian history".

In 2007, his photo and bio appeared on 20 million bags of Doritos. Weeks is the subject of a major photo exhibit, the book Peace in our Lifetime, and many smaller publications.

In 2008 and 2009, he received the Liberia National Excellence Award, and the Wangari Mathai Global Citizenship Award.

In 2011, Amherst College conferred an honorary doctorate degree on Weeks, making him the youngest person in the school's history to receive an honorary degree.

== Current ==
In late 2022, Kimmie Weeks served as Executive Director of Youth Action International. The organization provides education, health care and economic empowerment for children and youth in post-war African countries. Youth Action International has impacted more than one million lives since 2005. Weeks is also a member of the World Economic Forum's Global Agenda Council and a member of the Young Global Leaders Program. Weeks also serves in a part-time capacity as Chief Corporate Communications Strategist for Liberia second largest GSM company called Cellcom; he stepped down in 2016. In 2012, Liberian President Ellen Johnson Sirleaf appointed Weeks as Chairman of the Board of Directors for the Liberia Water and Sewer Corporation. The primary immediate task of the corporation is to provide safe drinking piped water to more than 800,000 Liberians in the capital for the first time since 1990. By late 2024 he was no longer on the Board of Directors.
