= Crisis Text Line =

Mental health support organization

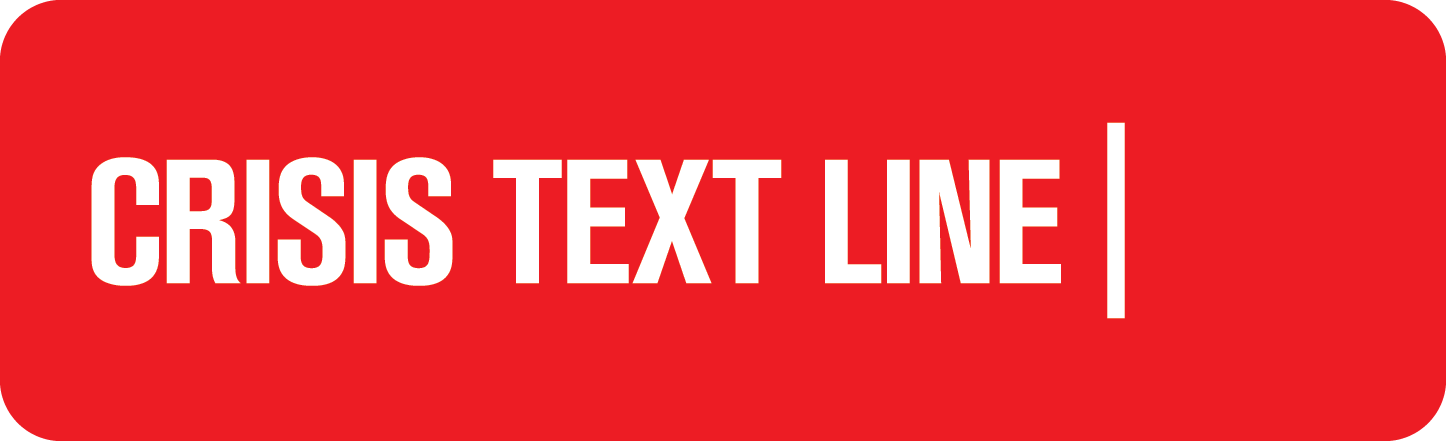
- Founded: 2013
- Founders: Nancy Lublin; Bob Filbin
- Founded at: New York, NY
- Purpose: Mental health support and crisis intervention
- Headquarters: New York City, United States
- Key people: Dena Trujillo (CEO)

Crisis Text Line is a global nonprofit organization providing free and confidential text-based mental health support and crisis intervention by texting HOME to 741741. The organization launched in 2013, and its services are available 24 hours a day throughout the United States, Canada, UK, and Ireland. As of March 2024, the organization reported that it had supported over 9 million support conversations.

== History ==
Crisis Text Line was conceptualized as a result of DoSomething's mobile interactions with its members. Nancy Lublin, DoSomething's former CEO, started Crisis Text Line after members of the DoSomething organization began reaching out via text for personal support. The service launched in 2013, as the first text-based nationwide hotline. By 2015, the text line was being contacted daily by more than 350 texters-in-crisis.

=== Timeline ===
- Early 2015: Lublin coordinated meetings over a week "to raise her first round of funding." And "[b]y the end of the week, she had her angel round of philanthropic capital, $5 million, mostly from tech entrepreneurs."
- July 2015: Verizon, Sprint, and T-Mobile started waiving fees for use of the service, and responded to privacy concerns by expunging texts to Crisis Text Line from billing records. AT&T then followed suit.
- January 2016: Chief Data Scientist Bob Filbin was highlighted in The Chronicle of Philanthropy as one of their 40 Under 40 for his work using data to inform Crisis Text Line's efforts. He explains that Crisis Text Line's data collection is centered on "people in their greatest moment of crisis," and that "most of the other data on mental health and crisis is survey data, which is collected after the fact."
- June 16, 2016: Crisis Text Line announced that it has raised $23.8 million from Reid Hoffman, Melinda Gates, Ballmer Group, and Omidyar Network, following the funding approach of tech start-ups.
- March 2017: Crisis Text Line began offering its services via Facebook Messenger.
- 2018: Crisis Text Line launched its services in Canada through a partnership with the Kids Help Phone organization.
- March 2019: Crisis Text Line reported passing its 100 million message milestone.
- May 2019: It launched its United Kingdom affiliate, Shout, with the Heads Together Foundation.
- April 2020: Business Insider reported that the novel coronavirus (COVID-19) pandemic has caused "a dramatic spike in people seeking help from crisis text hotlines [...] The spike coincides with the worsening of the novel coronavirus worldwide, as well as historic layoffs in the U.S." In just a number of weeks, "the number of texts to the hotline has been 47% to 116% higher than an average day".
- 2020: After multiple complaints about management, the Crisis Text Line staffers staged a virtual walkout and Twitter campaign (#NotMyCrisisTextLine) demanding the Board of Directors create an "anti-racist" work environment. In response the Board terminated Lublin and replaced two Board members.
- October 2021: Dena Trujillo became Interim CEO in 2020 and was named CEO in October 2021.
- 2021: Crisis Text Line launched a Spanish language service.
- January 2022, Politico investigated Crisis Text Line's practice text data with a for-profit company, Loris.ai, for the purpose of training automated customer support systems to be more “human, empathetic, and scalable”. The for-profit company and the nonprofit had close ties: Crisis Text Line had an ownership stake in Loris.ai previously had the same CEO for over a year. The two organizations had a revenue sharing agreement, which had not activated as of January 2022. The practice of sharing data from people in crisis drew criticism from privacy advocates and Crisis Text Line volunteers, but the nonprofit company argued the practice was legal because clients had continued texting after being notified of the terms of service in a link. The organization announced it was ending its data sharing arrangement three days later.
- May 2022: Nike announced its new podcast, "No Off-Season", which featured difficult conversations surrounding mental health topics. Told from the perspective of the brand’s top athletes, each episode was guided by mental health experts Crisis Text Line’s Chief Health Officer Dr. Shairi Turner and Global Expansion Director Natalia Dayan.
- 2023: Crisis Text Line released its United Empathy Report, an analysis of over 1.3 million conversations in 2022, highlighting the issues that texters discussed and the coping strategies that helped them feel better.

== Operations ==
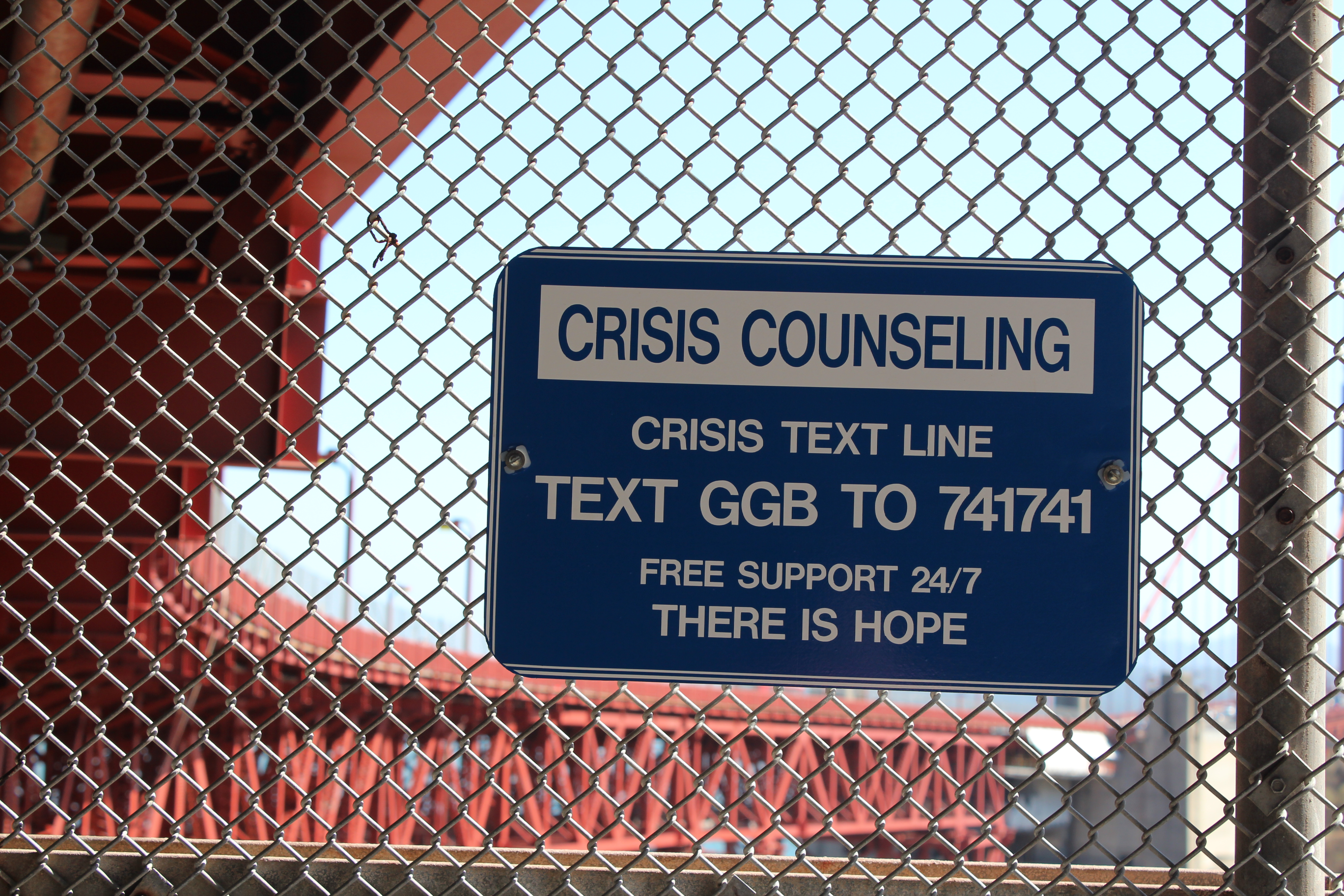
Sign promoting the Crisis Text Line at the Golden Gate Bridge

=== Crisis management ===
People who are in any crisis can reach out to the text line and expect to be connected with a crisis counselor. Text messaging has been shown to be an effective way to do crisis counseling due to its popularity with its target young audience, and the anonymity it provides. If the texter is at imminent risk of suicide or harm and is unwilling to separate themselves from the means of harm and create a safety plan, emergency services may be contacted in order to ensure the safety of the texter.

=== Methodology ===
The text line uses a triage system, in which conversations are assessed by an algorithm for severity and queued accordingly, as opposed to being queued chronologically. This identifies the most vulnerable texters (including those at imminent risk for suicide).

Crisis Text Line’s service is powered by volunteer Crisis Counselors who receive 30 hours of free comprehensive training that is virtual, interactive, self-paced and offered in English and Spanish. Clinical supervisors with degrees in mental health-related fields monitor every conversation, give feedback in real-time and provide additional support when necessary for volunteer Crisis Counselors. The training is also intended to help volunteers support their family and friends as well as navigate their own mental health.

=== Data collection ===
Crisistrends.org was launched in August 2014 to collect and analyze anonymized texting data derived from the activities of the Crisis Text Line platform. The data is used to display crisis trends according to texter gender, age, race, and ethnicity. It is shared with the public to help decrease the stigma around mental health support. Research agencies and institutions also can have access to this data for research purposes.

Crisis Text Line has many open data partnerships, one of them being a collaboration with the Lawrence Berkeley National Laboratory that aims to predict and prevent veteran suicides.

== See also ==
- National Suicide Prevention Lifeline
- Samaritans (charity)
- The Trevor Project
- Trans Lifeline
