= Wardrobe stylist =

Someone who selects the clothing for publications or public appearances

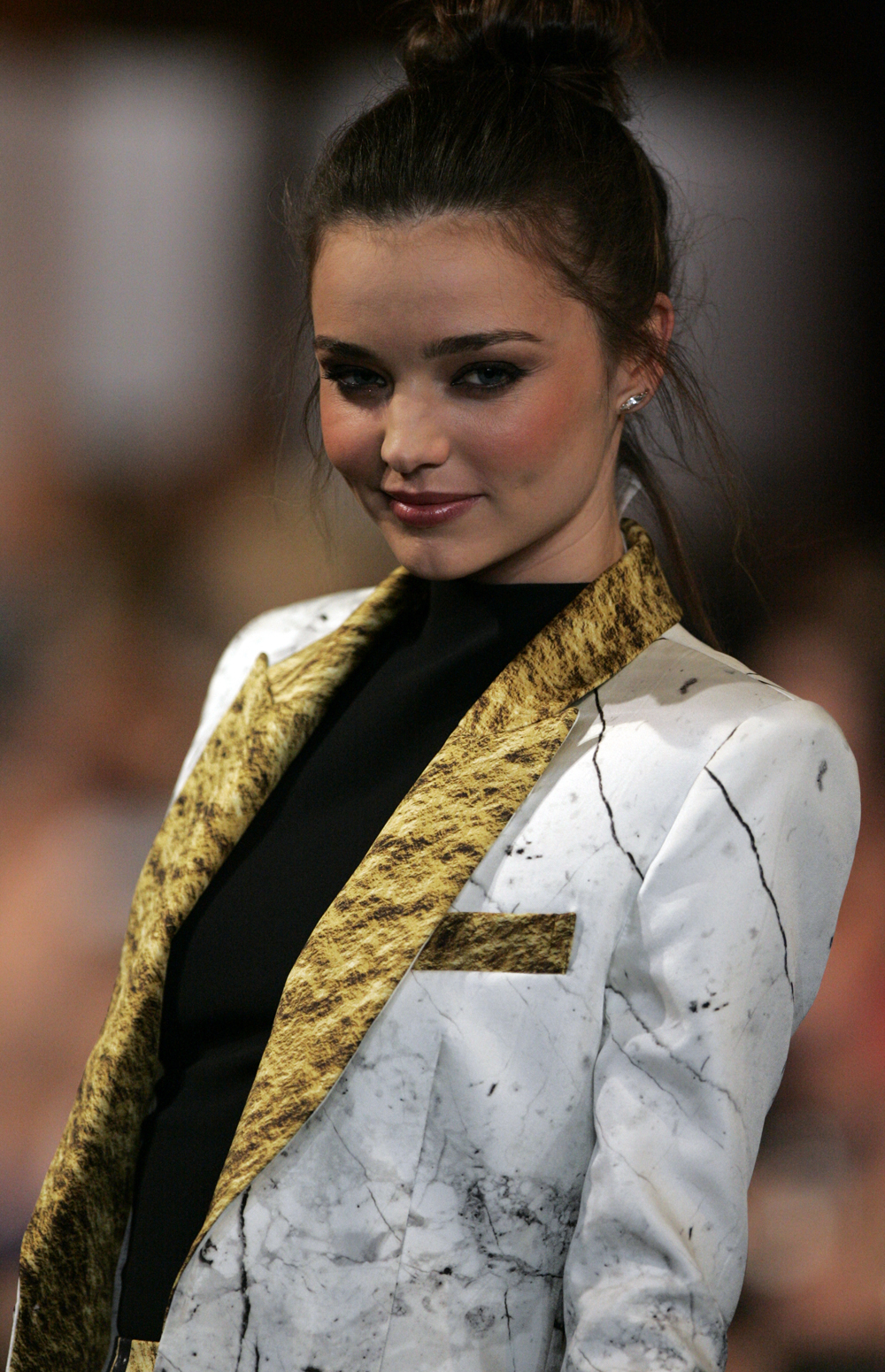
Supermodel Miranda Kerr, in Sydney in 2013, has a team of professionals working on her overall appearance, including hair and makeup experts, as well as a wardrobe stylist to select apparel for public appearances.

A wardrobe stylist, also fashion stylist, is a consultant (or person) who selects the clothing for published editorial features, print or television advertising campaigns, music videos, concert performances, and any public appearances made by celebrities, models or other public figures. Stylists are often part of a larger creative team assembled by the client, collaborating with the fashion designer, photographer/director, hair stylist, and makeup artist to put together a particular look or theme for the specific project. A wardrobe stylist can also be referred to as a fashion stylist, fashion editor, or celebrity stylist. According to one source, "Stylists are the people who push each celebrity to make the best dressed list." Stylists also assist with editorial photo shoots.

The job description varies greatly depending on the assignment. Stylists in the editorial and celebrity fields work primarily with designer samples, which are shown during fashion shows and presentations and are lent to members of the fashion press during the 4–6 months before retail sales begin. High-level stylists may collaborate directly with designers to produce custom clothing for celebrity clients or editorials; this is common for celebrity stylists whose clients attend awards shows and for fashion editors at top magazines. Stylists may also provide services such as personal shopping, restructuring a client's entire wardrobe, reorganizing a client's closet, or other duties relating to the client's personal lifestyle.

A wardrobe stylist is distinct from a costume designer, the person who clothes characters in film, television, or theater. A wardrobe stylist is also distinct from an image consultant or a color consultant. A person can be a color consultant without knowing the basic principles of line or style. An image consultant is an expert in both color and line, and may work with business professionals or individuals, as opposed to celebrities in particular. A color consultant's aim is to identify the most flattering colors for their client, while the goal of an image consultant is to tell a story about the client through clothes, shapes, and colors.

== Business arrangements ==
Wardrobe stylists can be paid an hourly wage, a day rate, or a project rate. Editorial assignments tend to pay less money, while advertising campaigns, commercials, or spokesperson campaigns tend to pay the most. Some freelance fashion editors, that is, stylists who work exclusively in producing editorial content, may receive a rate per page in a given publication; fashion editors typically negotiate this rate on a yearly basis, during which time the publication will assign a certain number of project pages to be completed. Stylists may also be paid a flat fee for the length of a project, usually called a buy out. Some stylists can be put on a monthly retainer, in which they are paid a set fee for a period of time and are on call for the entire time period.

Wardrobe stylists are sometimes represented by agencies that specialize in representing wardrobe stylists, hair stylists, and makeup artists. When a wardrobe stylist is represented by an agency, the agency usually books all of their work or assignments for a fee, usually ranging between 10% and 20% of the stylist's fee. The agency ensures that the stylist's needs are met, typically guaranteeing that transportation and travel and accommodations are all taken care of before the wardrobe stylist takes an assignment. Agencies usually expedite the client's payment and make sure that the wardrobe stylist is paid in full within 30 to 60 days of completion of the assignment.

== Training ==
Most stylists acquire professional skills and knowledge by assisting other glamorous, established stylists, in a system similar to apprenticeship. Stylist assistants are typically hired at a rate between $150 and $350 a day. Assistants' responsibilities can vary greatly depending on the stylist and the assignment. Some are hired only to perform physical labor, such as setting up for a client fitting or returning samples to a press showroom; others may help the stylist with selecting wardrobe options, preparing clients for public events, or any other task needed to complete an assignment.

According to one report in Seventeen Magazine, there were no specific education majors helpful for becoming a fashion stylist, but that degrees in fashion design, tailoring, merchandising, communications, marketing, color harmonies, art history and photography, understanding of the human body - how it stores fat and ages, psychology and how women's perception changes to color, could be helpful, but overall it was helpful to read fashion magazines regularly to develop a "great eye for fashion".

== See also ==
- London College of Fashion
