= Aria Finger =

Business professional

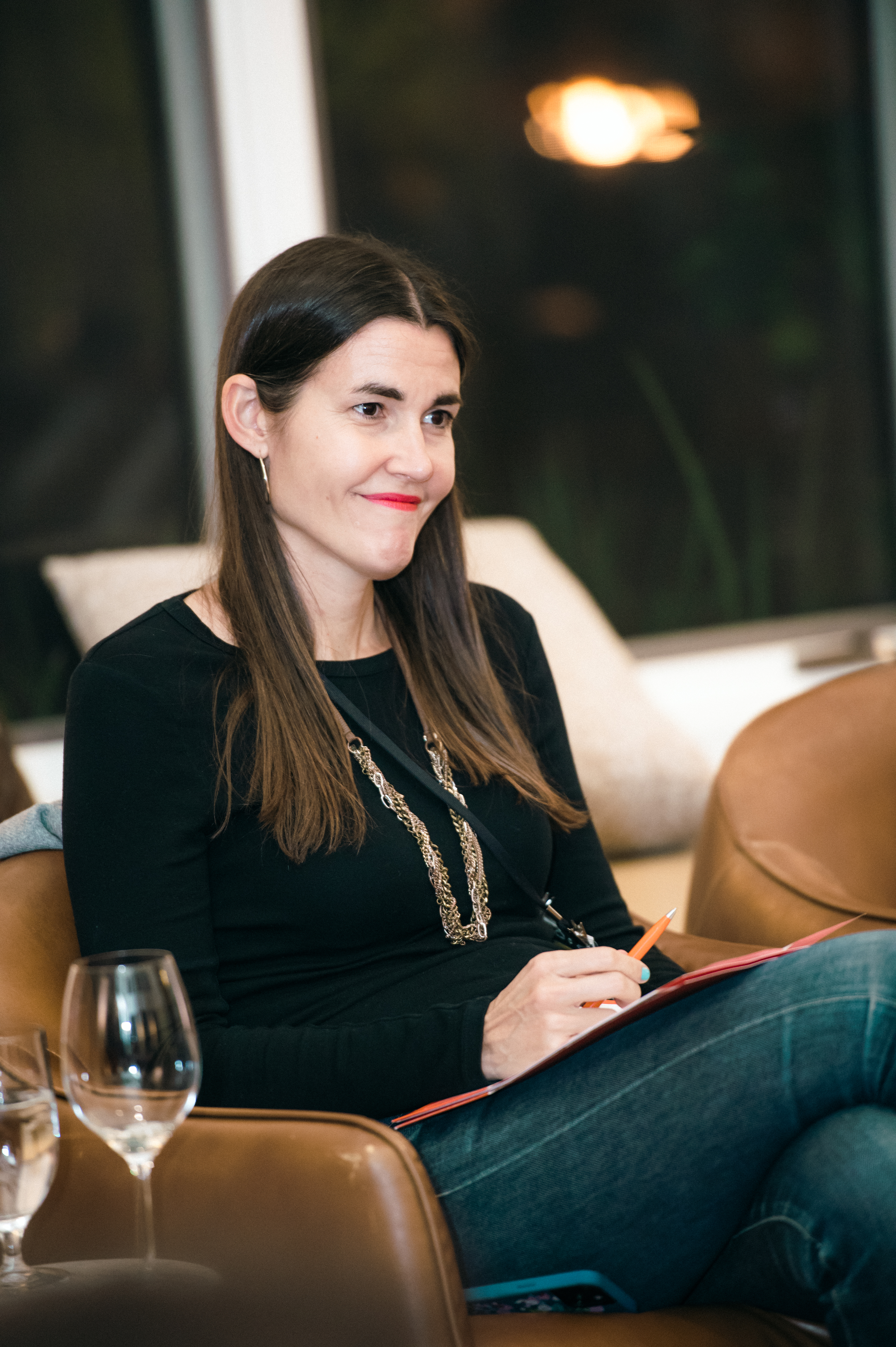
Aria Finger

Aria Finger is the Chief of Staff to Reid Hoffman. She also co-hosts, along with Hoffman, the podcast Possible.

Finger also serves as an adjunct professor of nonprofit business management at New York University.
