= Youth Action International =

- Location: Liberia; Sierra Leone; Uganda; US
- Executive Director: Kimmie Weeks
- Website: youthactioninternational.org

Youth Action International (YAI) Youth Action International, or YAI, is an international nonprofit working to rebuild war-torn African communities, founded by youth activist Kimmie Weeks, a survivor of the Liberian Civil War.

== Kimmie Weeks ==
According to their website, YAI was started and inspired by acclaimed youth activist Kimmie Weeks, a survivor of the First Liberian Civil War. At age nine, after nearly being buried alive as a result of disease, hunger and suffering, Weeks pledged to spend his life helping children. At age 16, in 1998 Weeks successfully headed Liberia's Children's Disarmament Campaign, an effort to lobby the disarmament of approximately 20,000 Liberian child soldiers. Two years later, his work led then Liberian President Charles Taylor and his government to attempt to have Weeks assassinated. As a result, Kimmie was forced to flee to the United States where he was granted political asylum.

Once he arrived in the United States, Kimmie Weeks enrolled and completed his final year of high school at Glasgow High School in Newark, Delaware. He then enrolled at Northfield Mount Hermon School in Northfield, Massachusetts, where he completed a post graduate program. In 2001, Weeks enrolled at Amherst College in Massachusetts and received a BA in Political Science and History in 2005. While at Amherst College, Weeks founded Youth Action International.

Weeks was the recipient of the 2007 Golden Brick Award which honors young people under 25 years old who are working to change the world. Also in 2007, Liberian President Ellen Johnson Sirleaf presented Kimmie with Liberia's highest honor by decorating him Knight Grand Commander in the Humane Order of African Redemption. Kimmie is the youngest recipient of this honor. He is featured in the new book "Peace in Our Lifetime" as an international peacemaker, along with Nelson Mandela, Gandhi, and Martin Luther King Jr. He serves on the Board of Directors of DoSomething and is a member of the World Economic Forum's Global Agenda Council.

== Organization ==
According to its website, YAI promotes the wellbeing and development of children and works to provide economic empowerment for war-affected youth (ages 13–30). YAI focuses on post-war countries (Liberia, Sierra Leone, Uganda) that face the daily realities of hunger, and a lack of basic needs such as clean water, safe schools, parks and medical care.

YAI has developed an extensive network of volunteers around the U.S. and Canada. YAI works for the survival, protection, and development of children and women in Africa through fundraising, education, and advocacy.

YAI is a non-profit organization incorporated in the state of Massachusetts and is tax exempt under Section 501(c)(3) of the Internal Revenue Code. YAI is governed by an independent, non-salaried board of directors

Headquartered in Traverse City, Michigan, Youth Action International maintains field offices in three countries in Africa: Liberia, Sierra Leone and Uganda.

In late 2022, Weeks served as Executive Director of YAI.

=== Chapters ===
YAI College Chapters support YAI's mission by educating their peers, faculty and staff of their colleges about YAI and its programs. They also fundraise for YAI programs.

Current Chapters

- Amherst College
- Bucknell University
- Marlboro College
- McGill University
- Middlebury College
- Mount Holyoke College
- Rutgers University
- Rye Neck High School - Kids with Sole
- Smith College
- State University of New York (SUNY) at Albany
- University of Minnesota

== Areas of focus ==
- Scholarships and educational services
- Small business development (including micro-loans)
- Vocational training
- Agricultural/farming
- Health care and awareness

== Funding ==
Financial support for its work is derived from voluntary contributions made by foundations, corporations, non-profit organizations, and individuals around the world as well as money raised through the efforts of YAI College Chapters and Kimmie Week's speaking tour.

== See also ==
- United Nations Mission in Liberia
