= Veterans Crisis Line =

Emergency telephone number for veterans and associates

- Formation: 2007
- Purpose: United States military veteran suicide prevention
- Region served: Nationwide
- Website: https://www.veteranscrisisline.net/
- Formerly called: National Veterans Suicide Prevention Hotline (2007–2011)

The Veterans Crisis Line is a United States–based crisis hotline for military veterans, service members, their families, and caregivers. The service is available 24/7 via the toll-free hotline number 988. Callers press 1 on their keypad to connect to the Veterans Crisis Line instead of the 988 Suicide & Crisis Lifeline, which shares the same number. It can also be reached by texting the SMS number 838255 or via online chat on the hotline's website.

== History ==
The Veterans Crisis Line (VCL) was established in 2007 as the National Veterans Suicide Prevention Hotline following the passage of the Joshua Omvig Veterans Suicide Prevention Act. It was renamed in 2011 to its current name. It is also referred to as the Military Crisis Line or the Veterans/Military Crisis Line in some documentation and resources. It is administered by the U.S. Department of Veterans Affairs in partnership with the Substance Abuse and Mental Health Services Administration.

After the Fall of Kabul in 2021, the VCL reported a significant increase in calls that numbered in the thousands. After the rollout of the shorter 988 phone number, an overall increase of calls to the VCL was reported.

In 2023, the VCL received criticism in a report from the U.S. Department of Veterans Affairs Office of the Inspector General (OIG). The report detailed the case of an unidentified veteran with a previous history of PTSD and other mental health concerns that died by suicide after a call with the VCL due to improper risk assessment. It also detailed the hotline's lack of protocols for saving text messages for potential future follow-up support. Department of Veterans Affairs officials stated that staff would be retrained and process and procedure changes would occur as a result of this. VA additionally announced a full investigation into the VCL's operations and stated that it would cooperate with a Government Accountability Office investigation.

A 2024 VA OIG report detailed several issues with VCL staffing. These issues specifically included a lack of supervisors, concerns of staff training, and the absence of emotional support for frontline hotline workers.

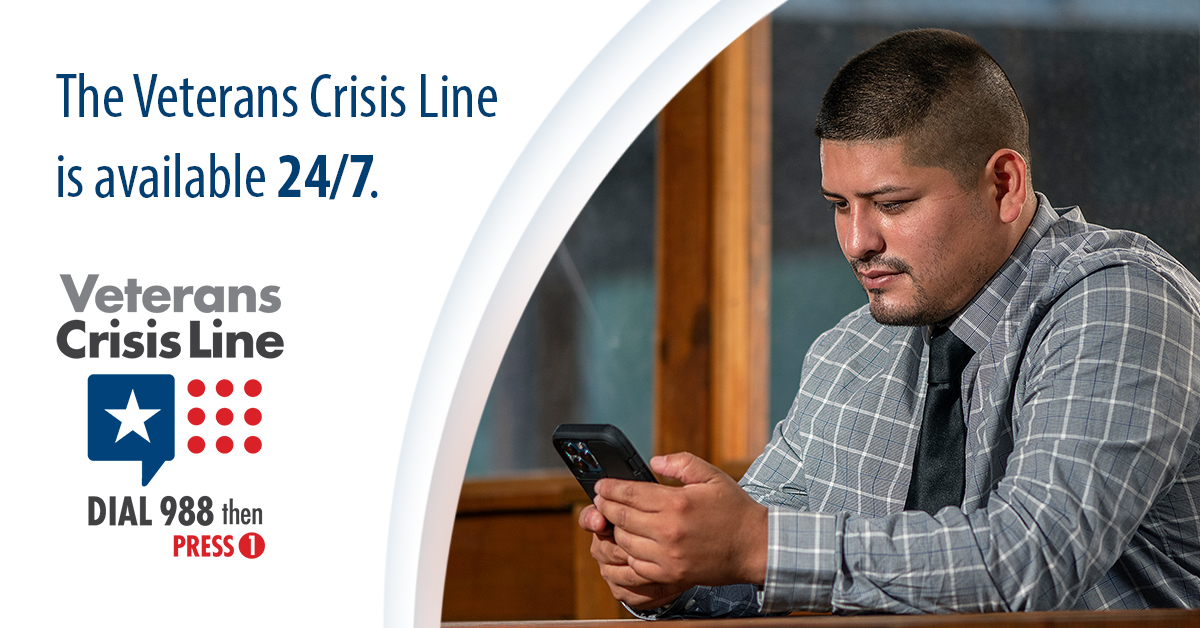
An image created by VA to spread awareness of the Veterans Crisis Line.

== Impact on callers ==
In a 2021 study, a majority of veterans interviewed after their usage of the hotline reported that they felt it was helpful and kept them safe. Internal VA statistics from 2022 showed that veterans who contacted the VCL were 10 times more likely to have contact with VA mental healthcare after calling than before their call. A 2023 study concluded that veteran callers who are linked to their VA healthcare records may have increased contact with VA mental healthcare after their calls with the VCL. A 2024 study that examined the Caring Letters program of the VCL found mixed results. Suicide attempts were not reduced, but contact with VA mental healthcare increased. The Caring Letters program sent supportive letters to VCL callers for a year after their contact with VCL.

== See also ==
- Crisis hotline
- List of suicide crisis lines
