= Dress for Success (organization) =

Women's career training organization

Dress for Success is a global nonprofit employment resource for unemployed and underemployed women. Its services include: career coaching and job-skill readiness, upskilling and reskilling, networking and community, and styling and professional attire. The organization was founded in 1997 by Nancy Lublin, and has since spread from Harlem, New York City, to almost 145 cities in the United States and twenty other countries. The organization reached about 45,000 clients each year in 2006, and, as of 2023, has helped over 1.3 million women. The parent organization's current CEO is Michele C. Meyer-Ship .

The organization's approach is based on social research suggesting that suitable attire is important to "impression formation", which in turn impacts job prospects. However, its approach has also been criticized by researchers, who found that the "benevolence of affluent volunteers serves to reinforce class and race superiority while producing moments of genuine care and connection."

Now a global organization, Dress for Success Worldwide supports its programs through a combination of grants, government funding, fundraising events and campaigns. In 2013, the parent organization received over $17 million in funding, more than 99% of which came from direct contributions by individuals, corporations, and non-governmental organizations. Dress for Success has received ongoing funding ($7 million USD) through a partnership with the Walmart Foundation, which funded a skills-development program (“Going Places Network by Walmart”).
