= Suicide and Crisis Lifeline =

Emergency suicide prevention and crisis hotline telephone number

988 (Suicide and Crisis Lifeline in the United States, or Suicide Crisis Helpline in Canada, and formerly known as the National Suicide Prevention Lifeline), sometimes written 9-8-8, is a suicide prevention and crisis help line to a network of a large number of crisis centers in the United States and Canada that provide 24/7 service to trained crisis counselors, via a toll-free hotline and with the three-digit short code telephone number 9-8-8.

In the United States, the 988 short code was implemented in July 2022 as an addition to its predecessor, a 1-800 number that existed since 2005. Calls to the hotline are routed to the nearest crisis center that provides immediate counseling and a referral to a local mental health service. The service supports people who call for their own crisis or for someone they care about.

A similar operation in Canada was launched on November 30, 2023.

== United States ==
988 Suicide & Crisis Lifeline
- Formation: January 1, 2005; 21 years ago
- Purpose: Suicide prevention
- Region served: United States
- Official language: English; Spanish also available on the hotline
- Volunteers: 150 (2014)
- Website: 988lifeline.org
- Formerly called: National Suicide Prevention Lifeline (2004–2022)

The 988 Suicide & Crisis Lifeline is a component of the National Suicide Prevention Initiative (NSPI), a multi-project effort to reduce suicide led by the Substance Abuse and Mental Health Services Administration's (SAMHSA) Center for Mental Health Services.

In July 2004, SAMHSA released a notice of funding availability (NOFA) as part of its National Suicide Prevention Initiative (NSPI). In keeping with SAMHSA's duty to advance the goals of the National Strategy for Suicide Prevention, the NOFA called for proposals from nonprofit organizations for using a toll-free number and website to expand, enhance and sustain a network of certified crisis centers providing suicide prevention and intervention services to those in need.

In September 2004, the Mental Health Association of New York City (MHA-NYC) was selected to administer the federally funded network of crisis centers named the National Suicide Prevention Lifeline.

On January 1, 2005, the National Suicide Prevention Lifeline was launched by the Substance Abuse and Mental Health Services Administration, a division of the Department of Health and Human Services, and Vibrant Emotional Health.

In April 2017, for his third album Everybody, American rapper Logic released a song featuring Canadian singer Alessia Cara and American singer Khalid titled "1-800-273-8255", the number used for the National Suicide Prevention Lifeline. On the day of the song's release, the lifeline received one of its highest daily call volumes; Lifeline's Facebook page also received triple the usual number of visitors, and its website reported "a 17% increase in users in May 2017 over the previous month." The song was made to bring awareness to the hotline and to the problems associated with suicide. Calls to the hotline increased by 50% the night the song was featured on the 2017 MTV Video Music Awards. Many of the callers to several crisis centers have mentioned Logic's song, and a third of those callers were struggling with suicidal thoughts. The song was performed at the 60th Annual Grammy Awards as a tribute to Linkin Park vocalist Chester Bennington, who had died by suicide in the previous year.

The National Suicide Hotline Improvement Act of 2018 required the Federal Communications Commission and other agencies to consider a three-digit telephone short code for the hotline. On August 15, 2019, the FCC recommended the number 988 for the hotline. On December 12, 2019, the Commission approved a proposed rule starting the process for public commenting and final rulemaking. The rule was adopted on July 16, 2020, in final form in a 5–0 vote by the FCC. The rule required telecommunication carriers to implement the telephone number 988 to route calls to the existing service number by July 16, 2022. This provided sufficient time to expand staff and training to handle the anticipated call volume.

In August 2019, U.S. Representatives Chris Stewart and Seth Moulton introduced the National Suicide Hotline Designation Act. On October 17, 2020, the National Suicide Hotline Designation Act (S.2661) was signed into law by President Trump to support the implementation of the hotline. Disability advocates, calling for equity, petitioned the FCC to implement text-to-988 service for deaf, hard-of-hearing and speech-disabled people. The following month, on November 20, 2020, T-Mobile became the first wireless carrier to implement the 988 number for voice calls.

Implementation of a new three-digit dialing code had implications for the structure of the telephone dialing procedures in the North American Numbering Plan. Numbering plan areas (NPAs) that had seven-digit dialing and telephone numbers with the central office code (exchange) 988 were required to either change to ten-digit dialing or retire the 988 exchange. Where ten-digit dialing was elected, which was the case in 82 numbering plan areas—only area code 701 retired the prefix—it was required to be implemented by October 24, 2021.

Massachusetts officials asked the FCC to change the routing of calls. Instead of routing calls based on a phone number's area code, officials propose using the caller's physical location, similar to how 911 operates. This change would ensure that callers connect with services near their location, providing more relevant and immediate assistance regardless of their phone's area code.

The National Suicide Prevention Lifeline was renamed to 988 Suicide & Crisis Lifeline on July 15, 2022. 988 was officially implemented as the toll-free nationwide telephone number for the hotline on July 16. According to call centers in Massachusetts, the easier-to-remember number and surrounding publicity increased the number of calls by about 30%.

The telephone number is also used for the Veterans Crisis Line (VCL). An increase of calls was reported to the VCL after the rollout of 988.

Google, Bing, Yahoo and Ask.com and most social media services return the telephone number and website of the lifeline as the first result for searches related to suicide, such as "how to tie a noose" or "I want to die."

=== LGBTQ youth service ===
In 2022, the service added a "Press 3 option" for LGBTQ+ youth to receive assistance from specialized counselors. Initially a pilot program in a government contract with The Trevor Project, the service grew to include seven centers making up the LGBT Youth Subnetwork.

On June 17, 2025, SAMHSA announced that the "Press 3 option" will end on July 17. Earlier that month, the service had been eliminated from the proposed 2026 budget for the Department of Health and Human Services. When asked about the proposed budget cut, a spokesperson for the Office of Management and Budget stated that the youth service was a "chat service where children are encouraged to embrace radical gender ideology".

Members of Congress, including Representative Raja Krishnamoorthi, urged HHS to restore the "Press 3" option by the end of the year. By June 2026, Vibrant Emotional Health planned to restore the "Press 3" option, and called for applications from crisis centers to manage its return. The Trevor Project was ineligible to apply, as their specific mention to serve transgender and non-binary youth was canceled by the Trump administration. Trevor Project CEO Jaymes Black stated a concern that the revived service "may exclude transgender and non-binary youth entirely". The service was restored by October 1, 2026, though the administration did not make clear how they would handle calls from transgender individuals, instead stating the service would defer to the president's executive orders related to gender identity.

=== Veterans hotline ===
In June 2007, the Department of Veterans Affairs (VA) partnered with SAMHSA and the National Suicide Prevention Lifeline to provide a hotline to help veterans in emotional crisis. Callers who are U.S. military veterans have the option of being routed to the Veterans Crisis Line by pressing 1. This service caters to VA-specific mental health needs, and helps connect vets to the VA Healthcare system. In addition to the hotline, the veterans hotline also offers text messaging support through texting to 838255, as well as an online chat service for those who want to use the hotline. The hotline also serves the needs of active duty service members, their families, and veterans' caregivers.

=== Criticism ===
Criticism of the 988 hotline has garnered social media and press attention.

Concerns centered on the role of emergency and police response with respect to involuntary commitment to treatment facilities and incurrence of medical bills. The hotline operator reported that before the adoption of 988, it dispatched emergency services for about 2% of calls. Its policy is to do so only if the caller does not cooperate with making a safety plan and seems likely to act on a plan of suicide.

The hotline has also been criticized for inadequate funding and staffing shortages.

A 2023 study that questioned 5,000 users of the hotline in a survey found that only a quarter of users would be "very likely" (rated as a 6 or 7 on a 7-point scale) to use the service again if they were in crisis. No reasons, however, were assessed for why users would or would not use the hotline, nor were findings released about how these users might use alternate methods of support.

A 2026 Harvard study found that suicide mortality rates among adolescents and young adults declined following the launch of a 988 suicide and crisis helpline, with it reporting 4,400 fewer suicide deaths than projected in the first two-and-a-half years of the 988 mental health crisis hotline going live.

== Canada ==
9-8-8: Suicide Crisis Helpline
- Formation: November 30, 2023; 2 years ago
- Purpose: Suicide prevention
- Region served: Canada
- Official language: English, French (24/7); Others via interpretation (subject to availability)
- Website: 988.ca

9-8-8 Suicide Crisis Helpline (French: 9-8-8 Ligne d'aide en cas de crise de suicide) is the service operating in Canada.

In December 2020, shortly after the U.S. FCC finalized its plans for 988, Canada's House of Commons unanimously passed a non-binding motion, put forward by Conservative MP Todd Doherty, calling on the federal government to establish 988 as the national suicide prevention hotline. In June 2021, the Canadian Radio-television and Telecommunications Commission (CRTC) recommended using a three-digit number, most likely 988, for mental health and suicide prevention in Canada, and began consultations on the matter, noting that the last four area codes with seven-digit dialing and numbers that begin with 988—506, 709, 807 and 867—would likely have to convert to ten-digit dialing.

The launch of the U.S. service in July 2022 caused increased attention to the then-still-pending Canadian plans; a Health Canada statement that month indicated it expected a CRTC decision on the matter before the end of 2022. As an interim measure, in June the CRTC had directed mobile service providers to provide automated messaging to those calling or texting 988 on or after July 16, 2022, redirecting them to Canada's existing suicide prevention services.

On August 31, 2022, the CRTC announced it had finalized its decision to make 988 the national three-digit code for mental health crisis and suicide prevention services, with a scheduled implementation date of November 30, 2023. In order to facilitate this implementation, area codes 709, 807, and 867 (Yellowknife area only) were required to convert to ten-digit dialing by no later than May 31, 2023 (area code 506 was already scheduled to convert to ten-digit dialing by April 2023). The Canadian 988 hotline, managed by the Centre for Addiction and Mental Health (CAMH), went into service on November 30, 2023.

== See also ==
- Crisis hotline
- Crisis Text Line
- List of suicide crisis lines
- Samaritans (charity)
- The Kristin Brooks Hope Center
- The Trevor Project
- Trans Lifeline
