= Net Literacy =

Non-profit computer literacy organization

Net Literacy is an Indianapolis based 501(c) non-profit organization that promotes computer and Internet literacy. The program is youth-run, with adult mentoring. All participants receive instruction for free.

== Governance ==
The students have their own operating board of directors to plan strategy, develop operational plans, write grant proposals, and organize their training efforts. The students are assisted by a small volunteer adult member board to sign and authorize contracts.

The honorary co-chairpersons are Senator Evan Bayh and Senator Richard Lugar. Dr. Suellen Reed, Superintendent of the Indiana Department of Education, also serves on the honorary board. Other members of the board include Vice President Mike Pence, Senator Joe Donnelly, Congresswoman Susan Brooks, past Congressman Dan Burton, Congressman Andre Carson, past Indianapolis Mayor Greg Ballard, Fort Wayne Mayor Tom Henry, past USIIA president Dave McClure, past Fort Wayne Mayor Graham Richard, and past Superintendent of Public Instruction Tony Bennett.

== Awards and recognition ==
In 2005, the student-volunteers lobbied members of the Indiana General Assembly, resulting in the passage of House Concurrent Resolution 85, honoring the program. The group was also recognized with presentations from former U.S. President Bill Clinton, former United States Secretary of State Colin Powell, former Senator Robert Dole and President George W. Bush in a White House ceremony. In 2006, Net Literacy received the Mother Teresa Kindness Award from the National Caring Institute and was recognized as the “Citizen of the Year” by Topics and several other Gannett Company newspapers.

The group has been endorsed by or partnered with over 400 organizations, including the Techpoint Foundation, the Indiana Recycling Coalition, the US Internet Industry Association, the AARP, the Urban League, the Indiana Association of Student Councils, Purdue University, the Verizon Foundation, the Lilly Endowment, the United Way of America, Bright House Networks, the Corporation for Education Technology, the Indiana Department of Education, and numerous school districts.

== Digital inclusion ==
Net Literacy's programs are independently beginning to be developed by students in the U.S. and abroad. The US Internet Industry Association submitted a filing to the U.S. Federal Communications Commission naming Net Literacy's model as their preferred approach to reducing the digital divide in the United States. Net Literacy was selected by the European Union Study on Digital Inclusion as one of the 91 most promising good practice initiatives based upon an investigation of 32 countries including the EU Member States, the United States, Norway, Iceland, Canada, and India. Microsoft's publication Innovating for inclusion: A Digital Inclusion guide for those leading the way, cites Net Literacy as one of the best of class digital inclusions examples. Other organizations and consortiums, including the US Broadband Coalition with 170 members that including Google, Comcast, Verizon and Cisco Systems, cited Net Literacy and its model as a policy consideration in its Adoption and Usage Report. The report was prepared for the Federal Communications Commission on behalf of the U.S. broadband industry to support the FCC's National Broadband Plan blueprint report to the U.S. Congress. The FCC cited Net Literacy and its programs (Digital Literacy Corps, Community Connects, and Senior Connects) in the National Broadband Plan presented to Congress in April, 2010.

== Programs ==
=== Senior Connects ===
Senior Connects is a program of Net Literacy that was founded as the Senior Connects Corporation in 2003. Senior Connects targets retirement homes, independent living facilities and nursing homes, and provides computers and computer and Internet training to the residents. Through the Senior Connects program residents receive computer and Internet access. The program builds computer labs inside independent and assisted living facilities, teaches seniors how to use the computer and access the Internet, and provides access and increased computer access to seniors

Each Senior Connects team is anchored in a high school. Some high schools are piloting programs that invite senior citizens into the schools to use the schools’ computer labs.

=== Safe Connects ===
The Safe Connects program targets K-12 students teaching Internet safety. Safe Connects works with public schools and the Department of Education to integrate the Safe Connects curricula into School curricula. The main categories of the curriculum include Internet predators, adult content, online safety and netiquette.

Volunteer high school students are provided with training materials to conduct classes for their younger peers in the presence of their parents. While first focusing on 4th through 6th grade and high school students, the Safe Connects website includes a section for students, parents, K-12 teachers, and other youth organizations. The program, which was approved by the Indiana Department of Education, has a 4-6 grade program, and 7/8 grade program, and a 9-12 grade program tested at several central Indiana high schools. The K-3 and 7-8 grade programs. In 2009, the Indiana General Assembly passed a resolution calling for all Indiana Public, educational, and government access (PEG) Channels to carry the Safe Connects programming.

=== Computer Connects ===
The Computer Connects a program collects and refurbishes computers. The computers are then distributed by Community Connects to Senior centers and other community centers.

On all donated computers (unless otherwise requested), the hard drive is securely wiped using DBAN. On most computers that are refurbished by Computer Connects, a slipstreamed version of Windows 2000 with OpenOffice.org is installed.

In 2006, high schools began establishing their own Computer Connects programs, repurposing computers to families on public assistance that could not otherwise afford to purchase a computer for their children to complete their homework at home.

=== Community Connects ===
The Computer Connects program provides computer labs to United States Department of Housing and Urban Development and Section 8 apartments, community centers, pre-school, after school, faith-based and other nonprofits seeking to establish their own computer labs, with the help of mayors and town managers, including the Indianapolis and Fort Wayne mayors.

=== Financial Connects ===
Financial Connects' is a website that aggregates financial literacy videos and online interactive games. It also includes 20 original financial literacy videos that served as a pilot to test the feasibility of the project. One month after the Financial Connects website launched, Net Literacy received a $98,000 grant from State Farm insurance so the website could be expanded and serve as a national financial literacy website created by students. Indiana's Superintendent of Public Instruction Dr. Tony Bennett commended the students on this project and the IDOE sent an email to every Indiana Principal and Superintendent encouraging them to participate in a contest which will provide 100 prizes ranging from $250 to $1,000 for videos and interactive games used on this website.

=== Computer recycling ===
Environmental Protection Agency-compliant computer recycling is a part of the computer-drives. Asset Forwarding, a member of both the Indiana and National Recycling Coalition has endorsed Net Literacy and agreed to be the "point company" in a statewide computer recycling drive.

=== Nonprofit assistance ===
Net Literacy student volunteers adopt projects and programs for their community. As an example, during a Lilly Endowment summer program, 18 student volunteers built websites for 20 nonprofits as a community service, many of which could not have otherwise been able to afford an online presence. A second project focused on building a website for the community group NESCO.
