= Power dressing =

1980s women's business fashion style

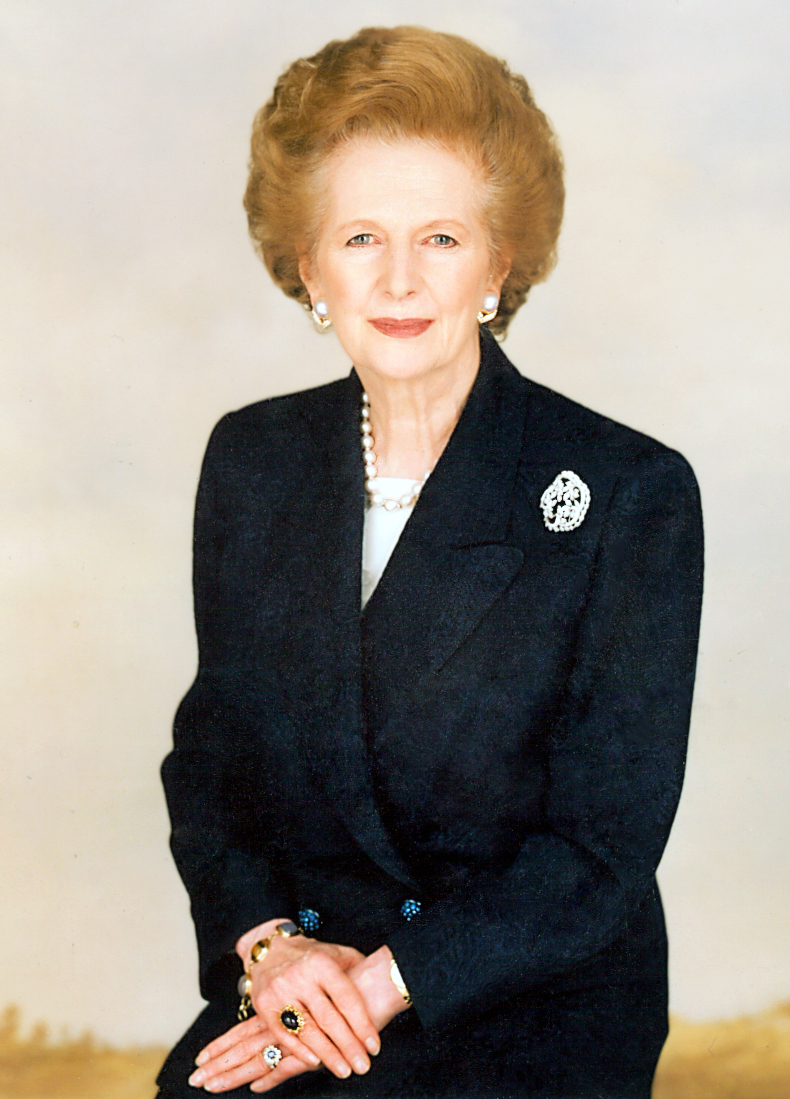
Margaret Thatcher wearing a typical power dressing outfit

Power dressing is a workplace fashion style that was popular among working women in the late 1970s and 1980s involving establishing their authority in a professional and political environment traditionally dominated by men.

== History ==
The Chanel suit of the 1920s may be considered a predecessor of power dressing: a tight skirt and wool button-up jacket with metallic buttons and fitted sleeves. The women's suit was deliberately designed for changing lifestyles among women in the World War I era. According to the costume historian Harold Koda, the Chanel suit allowed women of the time to de-sex their feminine look and to have a more masculine appearance in order to be accepted as equals in the professional sphere.

Power dressing emerged in the second half of the 1970s, tied to a rise in opportunities for women in the workforce. John T. Molloy popularized the concepts with manuals called Dress for Success (1975) and Women: Dress for Success (1977). He recommend the skirted suit as "uniform" of professional women, stressing that a gendered professional dress code was how women would acquire authority, respect and power at work.

Early forms of power dressing resembled male garments: tailored suits, jackets with padded shoulders, roll-neck sweaters and knee length skirts. The upper part of the body was covered by a jacket to de-emphasize breasts, the bottom covered with a skirt that was a reminder of femininity. Accessories like silk scarves and discreet jewelry, like brooches or pearls, added femininity. Power clothing is typically neutral shades like navy, grey, and black or non-floral patterns such as pinstripes, houndstooth, and plaids.

It was not until women's acceptance as authoritative professionals that the men's suit was renovated into a feminized garment with different fabric, cut, color and ornament — clothing to stand out from male apparel, not just blend in. Mid- to late-1980s power uniforms expanded to include blouses with cravat neck wrappings or foulards and other feminine elements. Shoulder pad designs of Claude Montana are considered a defining feature of 1980s power dressing.

Professional women used this clothing style to detach themselves from aesthetics-focused or frivolous notions of fashion and instead embody self-esteem and confidence. A primary purpose of power dressing is to reduce sexualization of the female body, which can interfere with workplace operations and conflict with ideas of authority. Clothing may counterbalance aspects of a woman's natural feminine appearance and prevent sexual misinterpretation.

== In the media ==
=== Icons ===
Public figures associated with power dressing include Margaret Thatcher, Hillary Clinton, and Michelle Obama. Thatcher's adoption of power suits contributed to her "reputation as the original female power-dresser" and influenced the common fashion of female politicians such as Hillary Clinton, whose pantsuits follow in the Thatcher style.

Typical power suits worn by Margaret Thatcher consisted of a wide shoulder skirt suit, a pussy bow blouse, her famous Asprey handbag, and a pearl necklace. According to Vogue, Thatcher reinvented her appearance for the Prime Minister role per Molloy's suggestions.

=== Film and television ===
1980s soap operas such as Dallas (1978–1991) and Dynasty (1981–1989) demonstrated power dressing, and the more colorful costume design in Dallas contributed to bright colors in power dressing like fuchsia, sea greens, or royal blues. The pointed toes and spiked heels of the 1950s and early 1960s were long gone, replaced by white satin or canvas fashion shoes.

The 1988 film Working Girl demonstrates business elegance of superboss Katherine, who wears a mid-grey collarless silk jacket with padded shoulders as well as vivid red dresses. The secretary Tess differs stylistically, wearing a long black sparkly dress and a dark brown fur coat that attracts attention, causing her to be described as: "the first woman […] that dresses like a woman, not like a woman would think a man would dress if he was a woman". Other, younger secretaries wear nonprofessional clothing like leopard print jackets, tights, baggy leather outerwear, and gaudy hoop earrings.

The 2011 biographical drama of Margaret Thatcher, called The Iron Lady, shows stylistic aspects of her transformation into Britain's prime minister.

== See also ==
- 1980s in fashion
- Shoulder pads (fashion)

== Bibliography ==
- Akbari, Anna (2008). Fashioning Power: Visual Self-presentation in Social Life. The New School for Social Research. Dissertation for the degree of Doctor of Philosophy.
- Entwistle, J. (2000). The Fashioned Body: Fashion, Dress and Modern Social Theory. Polity Press. ISBN 0745620078.
- Koda, Bolton, Saillard, Garelick (2005). Chanel. Metropolitan Museum of Art. ISBN 9780300107135.
- John T. Molloy (1975). New Dress for Success. Warner Books. ISBN 0446385522.
- John T. Molloy (1980). New Women's Dress for Success. Business Plus. ISBN 0446672238.
- Nava, Blake, MacRury, Richards (1996). Buy This Book: Studies in Advertising and Consumption. Routledge. ISBN 0415141311.
- Wilson, E. (2003). Adorned in Dreams: Fashion and Modernity. London: Virago. ISBN 0813533333.
