= 22 Pushup Challenge =

Activity promoting veteran suicide prevention

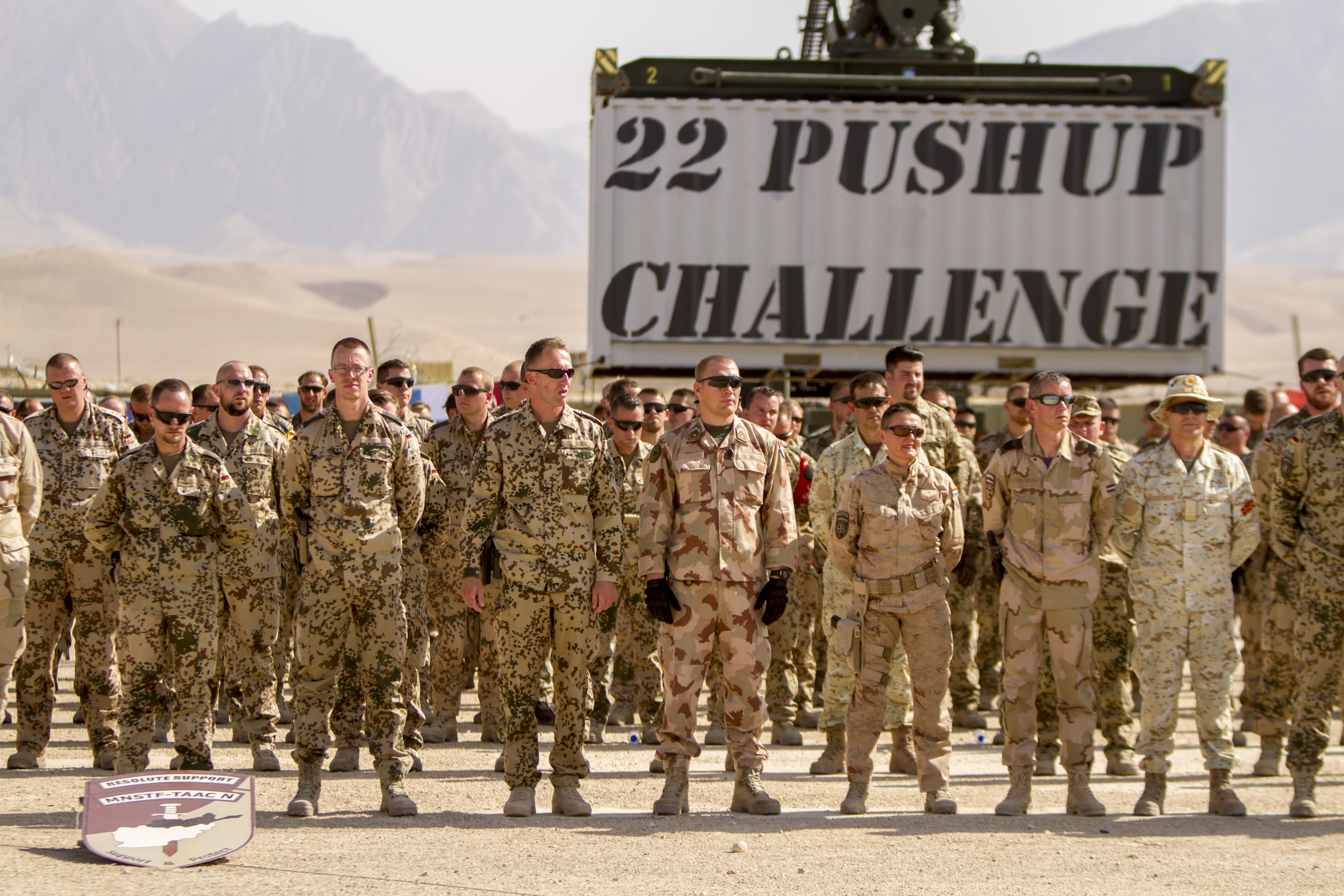
Over 800 soldiers from 20 nations take part in the 22 Pushup Challenge in Afghanistan.

The 22 Pushup Challenge, sometimes called the 22KILL Pushup Challenge, was an activity involving pressing out twenty-two pushups to promote awareness for veteran suicide prevention along with honoring military service members and veterans.

The viral awareness campaign gained traction and started to garner Hollywood celebrity support and participation in August 2016. Social media outlets like Twitter, Instagram, and Facebook news feeds began to be inundated with video posts of celebrities doing their 22 pushups and then challenging other celebrities, pro athletes, politicians, etc. — i.e., Dwayne ‘The Rock’ Johnson, John Krasinski, Chris Pratt, Chris Evans, Scott Eastwood and others have posted videos of themselves completing the 22 pushups.

== Origin ==
The original campaign named #22KILL was created by an OEF Marine veteran named Andrew K. Nguyen, founder of multiple veteran organizations—22KILL, HCC, White Star Families of America, and veteran.Me. The "Pushup Challenge" had first started in 2011 through the veteran nonprofit organization Honor Courage Commitment, Inc., but later continued to evolve while maintaining the foundation to honor military veterans and their service. In early 2013, the VA released a statistic that 22 veterans die by suicide every day on average which initially garnered limited media coverage.

HCC's original pushup challenge collaborated with Thunder Road Film #sweat4vets to launch the "22 pushup" campaign in Oct 2013.

== Elements of campaign ==
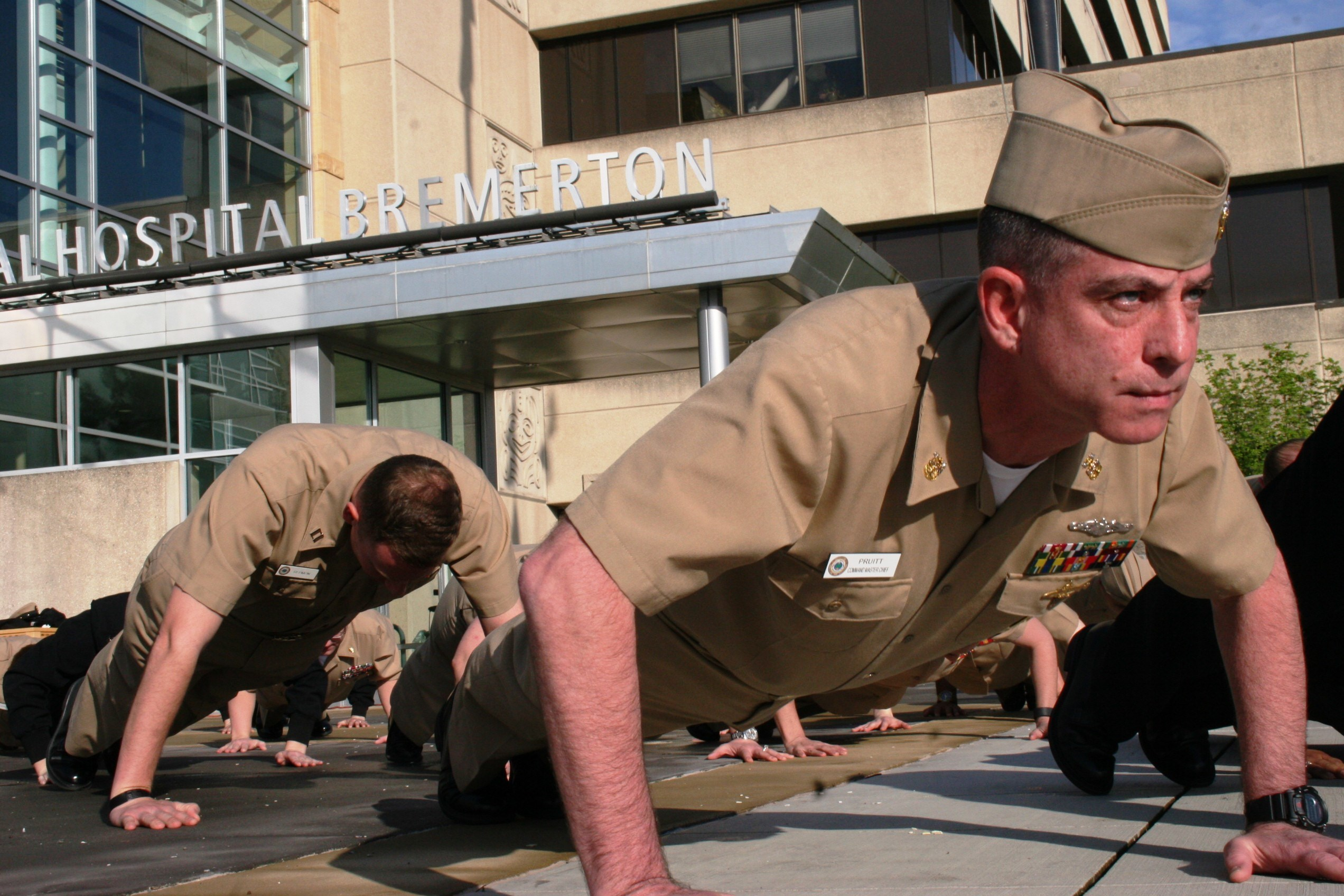
United States Navy personnel from the Naval Hospital Bremerton participating in the 22 Pushup Challenge in 2016

The introduction of the black 22KILL Honor Ring was in October 2013 after Nguyen brainstormed together with fellow Navy veteran Nicholas Ciolino, sharing their perception that veterans' honorable service and sacrifices were unrecognized. Nguyen tried to create a unique and subtle but recognizable symbol of honor with an objective of connecting veteran advocates with each other (by noticing the ring on others in public). The originally idea was to name it "Black Trigg" in reference to the tungsten/titanium black ring designed to be worn on the index finger or trigger finger of a veteran advocate or those who supported the cause. Both veterans and non-veterans who support the cause can earn an Honor Ring by committing to pressing out 22 pushups in honor for the US military and the veterans who've served honorably.

The pushup aspect of the awareness campaign proved of value in the organic growth of campaign's mission because it garnered much attention when the pushups were done in a public setting, which ultimately led to people asking what the pushups were all about. This ongoing strategy combined with leveraging social media to maximize exposure ultimately led to mainstream adoption.

== Initial success ==
As a rule, a supporter must press out 22 pushups to earn the privilege of wearing an Honor Ring which symbolizes a physical act of commitment to support veterans. In March 2014, Julie Hersh, President of Hersh Foundation and author of Struck By Living, learned about 22KILL and made 22 pushups wearing a skirt and boots. The video was posted on Facebook and shared in an article posted on Psychology Today around the topic of veteran suicide. Julie Hersh's son poked fun at her pushups stating that they did not count due to improper form spurred up a thread of comical comments of friends agreeing with her son's comments. This ultimately became the catalyst for the #22KILL #22PushupChallenge Campaign which Julie Hersh pledged to donate $100 for every video posted of them doing their 22 pushups. The campaign was a success which launched on March 28, 2014, for a week with the deadline on April 4, 2014. More than tripling the goal of 22pushup videos posted, 22KILL immediately continued the momentum by launching a follow-on goal to 22 million pushups in the same manner of posting videos of 22 pushups and challenging others.

Although posts of pushup videos continued trickle in on social media after the initial surge from the Hersh campaign, Nate Koehn an Army veteran and 22KILL Veteran Advocate re-ignited the pushup campaign by garnering local news coverage in his local town, Wyoming, MI.

The "22" number was part of a statistic that was originally released through a case study done by the Department of Veteran Affairs in 2012, but since then have released an updated study, showing the rate had fallen to "20" veteran suicides per day.

In the US, many people participated for the 22KILL nonprofit organization, and even in the UK, many people along with British troops participated in the #22KILL #22PushupChallenge.

Similar to the ALS IceBucketChallenge, it encourages participants to be filmed doing 22 pushups and then nominating others to do the same. How the #22PushupChallenge was different was that requesting donations was not a primary focus which may have alleviated any stresses of financial obligation to participate. The campaign also evolved and many participants committed to doing 22 pushups for 22 consecutive days and posting the videos on various social media platforms.
