= Nancy Lublin =

American nonprofit executive and businesswoman

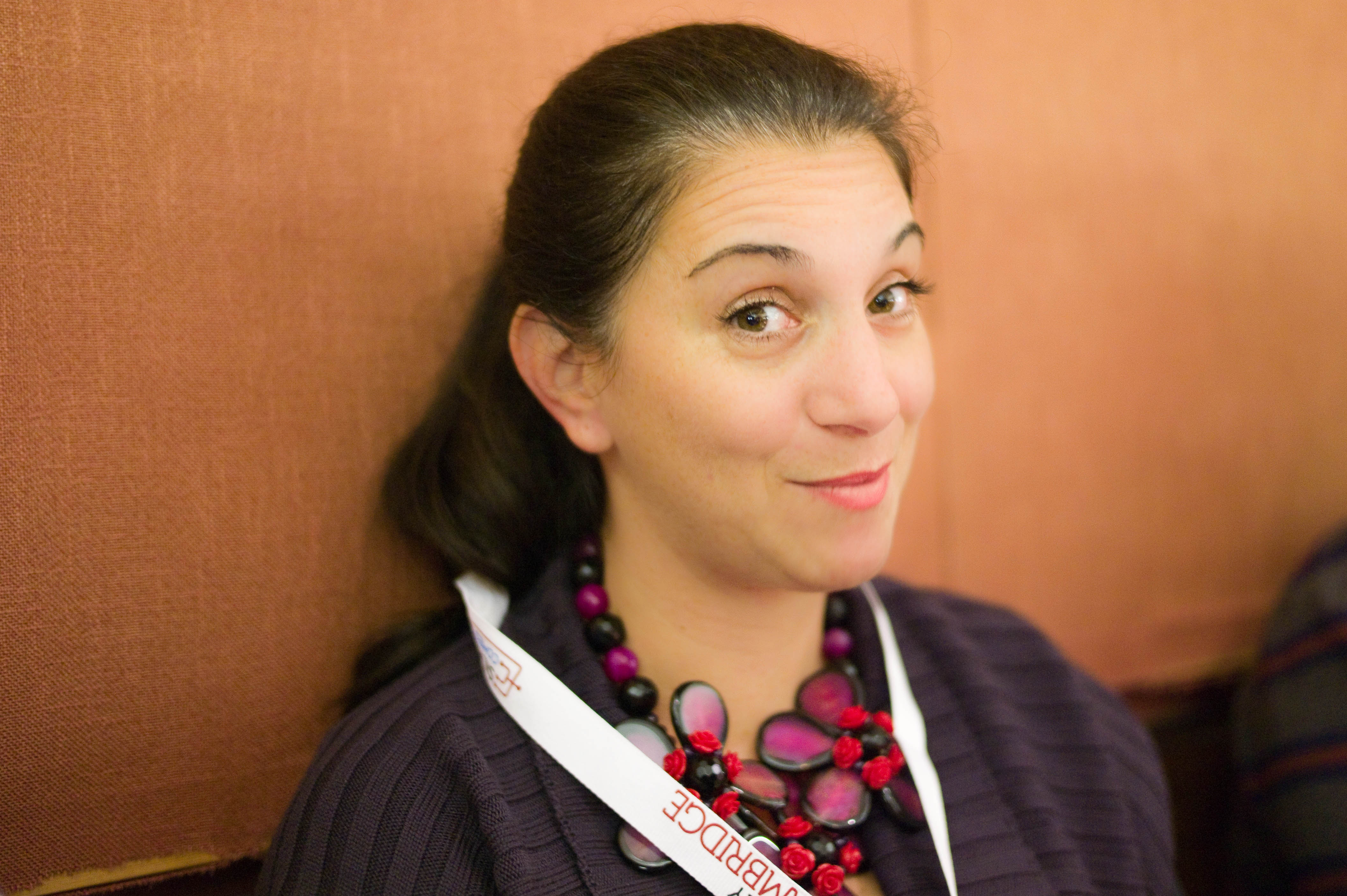
- Lublin in 2010
- Born: June 30, 1971 (age 55)
- Education: Brown University (1993)
- Known for: Creator of Dress for Success, Former CEO of Do Something Inc., Former CEO of Crisis Text Line

Nancy Lublin (born June 30, 1971) is an American nonprofit executive and businesswoman who was the founder and former CEO of Crisis Text Line and the founder of Dress for Success. She was also the CEO of Do Something Inc., a company that mobilizes youth to participate in social change, from 2003 to 2015.

In 2022 Lublin cofounded Primiga LLC, an early stage investment company.

== Early life and education ==
Lublin attended the Kingswood Oxford School in West Hartford, Connecticut, before graduating from Brown University in 1993, Oxford University (where she was a Marshall Scholar), and New York University School of Law.

== Career ==
In 1995, Lublin founded the organization Dress for Success, starting with $5,000 in seed money and a group of nuns in Harlem. The organization provides women with interview suits and career development training in more than 114 cities in 12 countries.

From August 2003 to October 2015, Lublin oversaw the growth of Do Something and led the effort to begin awarding more grant money to younger candidates seeking social change. The not-for-profit company has seen a significant revival, primarily in its use of online marketing and social campaigns. In 2007 the organization began hosting the DoSomething Awards (previously held, since 1996, as the Br!ck Awards). Broadcast on VH1 (through 2013), they were the first televised awards show celebrating volunteerism, and featured hosts including Jane Lynch (2011), cast members of New Girl (2012), and Sophia Bush (2013). Since 2013, the DoSomething Awards have been given monthly, awarding scholarships to young people that have distinguished themselves through volunteerism.

Lublin's resignation letter from Do Something was picked up by Refinery29 with the headline "This Might Be The Best Resignation Letter Ever Written." The letter itself described Lublin's successes at the organization.

Lublin wrote a monthly column in Fast Company entitled "Do Something". She has been a featured speaker at TED conferences.

In 2013, while still CEO of Do Something, Lublin developed her first TED talk into the foundation for a new nonprofit organization, Crisis Text Line. Crisis Text Line is the first 24/7, free, nationwide text line, using big data techniques (and algorithms) to stack-rank the texter queue based on severity.

In 2020, after multiple complaints about management, Crisis Text Line staffers staged a virtual walkout and Twitter campaign demanding the Board of Directors create an "anti-racist" work environment. In response the Board terminated Lublin and replaced two board members.

In 2022 Lublin was named as an investor in Wicked Saints, a new gaming studio with an all-female C-suite.

In 2022 Lublin cofounded the seed-stage investment company Primiga LLC with Kathi Lublin.

== Published works ==
Lublin's Zilch: The Power of Zero in Business was released on June 23, 2010. She has also published "Do Something!: A Handbook for Young Activists". and "Pandora's Box: Feminism Confronts Reproductive Technology".

Lublin was also an editor of "The XYZ Factor: The DoSomething.org Guide to Creating a Culture of Impact". The book is a collection of essays from DoSomething.org staff members on their experiences building and participating in a positive workplace culture.

== Awards and honors ==
Lublin was named one of Fortune's "World's 50 Greatest Leaders" (2014) and Marie Claire's "20 Women Changing the World" (2014). She is a Crown Fellow of the Aspen Institute (2013) and was selected as one of Schwab's Social Entrepreneurs of the Year (2014).

Lublin was named to the World Economic Forum's Young Global Leaders (2007), one of Glamour magazine's Women of Worth (2006), received Fast Company's Fast 50 Award (2002), and was named the NYC Women's Commission Woman of the Year (2000) as well as the Schwab Foundation's Social Entrepreneur of the Year (2016). She was also named in LinkedIn's top 50 Influencers (2018) and The NonProfit Times' Power & Influence Top 50 (2011, 2012, 2013, 2014).

In 2017 she was featured as a protagonist in the podcast series by Reid Hoffman (Linkedin co-founder), Masters of Scale, among other businessmen of success such as Mark Zuckerberg, John Elkann and Brian Chesky. She discussed the strategy at Crisis Text Line and how they adapted it to scale.

In 2018, Lublin was awarded an Honorary Doctorate from The New School.

Lublin is a member of Phi Beta Kappa.
