= Dress for Success (book) =

Book by John T. Molloy

- First edition
- Author: John T. Molloy
- Language: English
- Genre: Non-fiction
- Publisher: Peter H. Wyden
- Publication date: 1975
- Publication place: United States

Dress for Success is a 1975 book by John T. Molloy about the effect of clothing on a person's success in business and personal life. It was a bestseller and was followed in 1977 by The Women's Dress for Success Book. Together, the books popularized the concept of "power dressing".

Molloy's advice was unusual because they ran actual tests by showing drawings to people and compiling their perceptions of the impact of the clothes. In The Women's Dress for Success Book, he stated, "This is the most important book ever written about women's clothes, because it is based on scientific research, not on [the author's] opinion."

What was discovered is still included in "advice" articles today: Dress like you already have the job. Respondents subconsciously judged the clothes to see that the wearer fit in with other employees. Molloy frankly stated, that the attempt to "look like" current employees posed a special challenge for women and minority applicants in the contemporary (1977) reality of a white, male-dominated workplace.
