= Suicides at the Golden Gate Bridge =

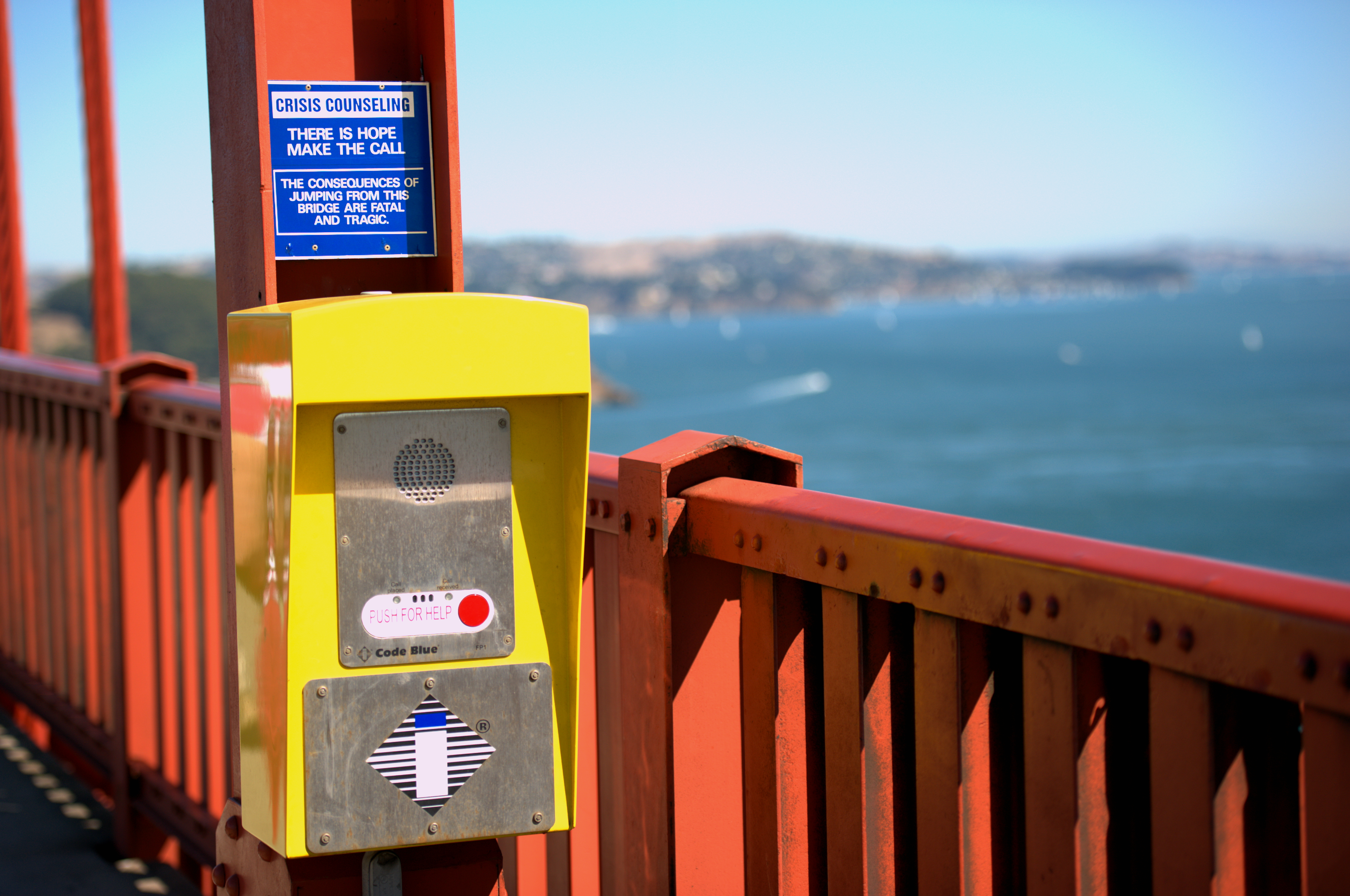
Special telephones on the Golden Gate Bridge link directly to suicide crisis hotlines.

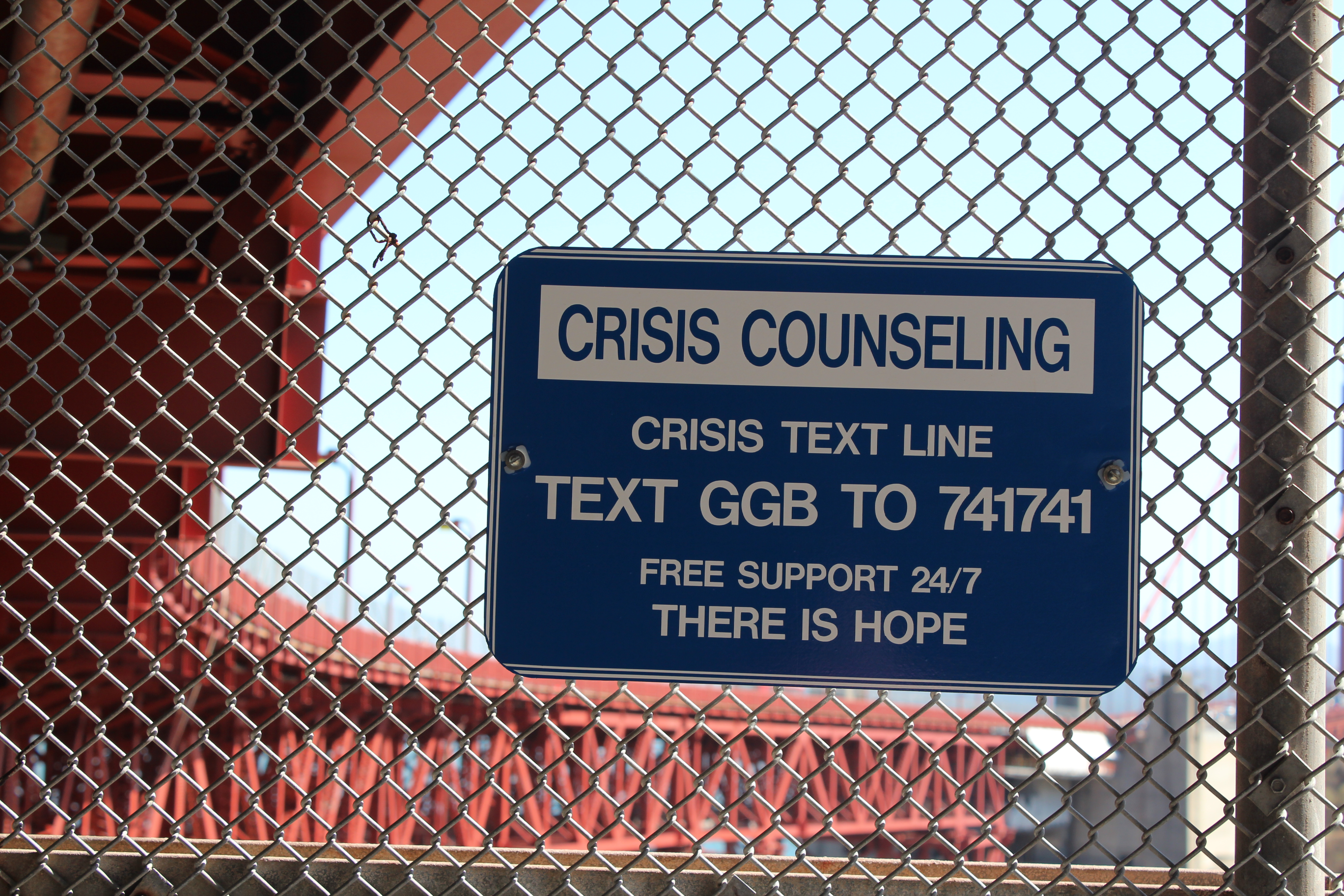
Sign promoting a 24/7 crisis text line on the Golden Gate Bridge

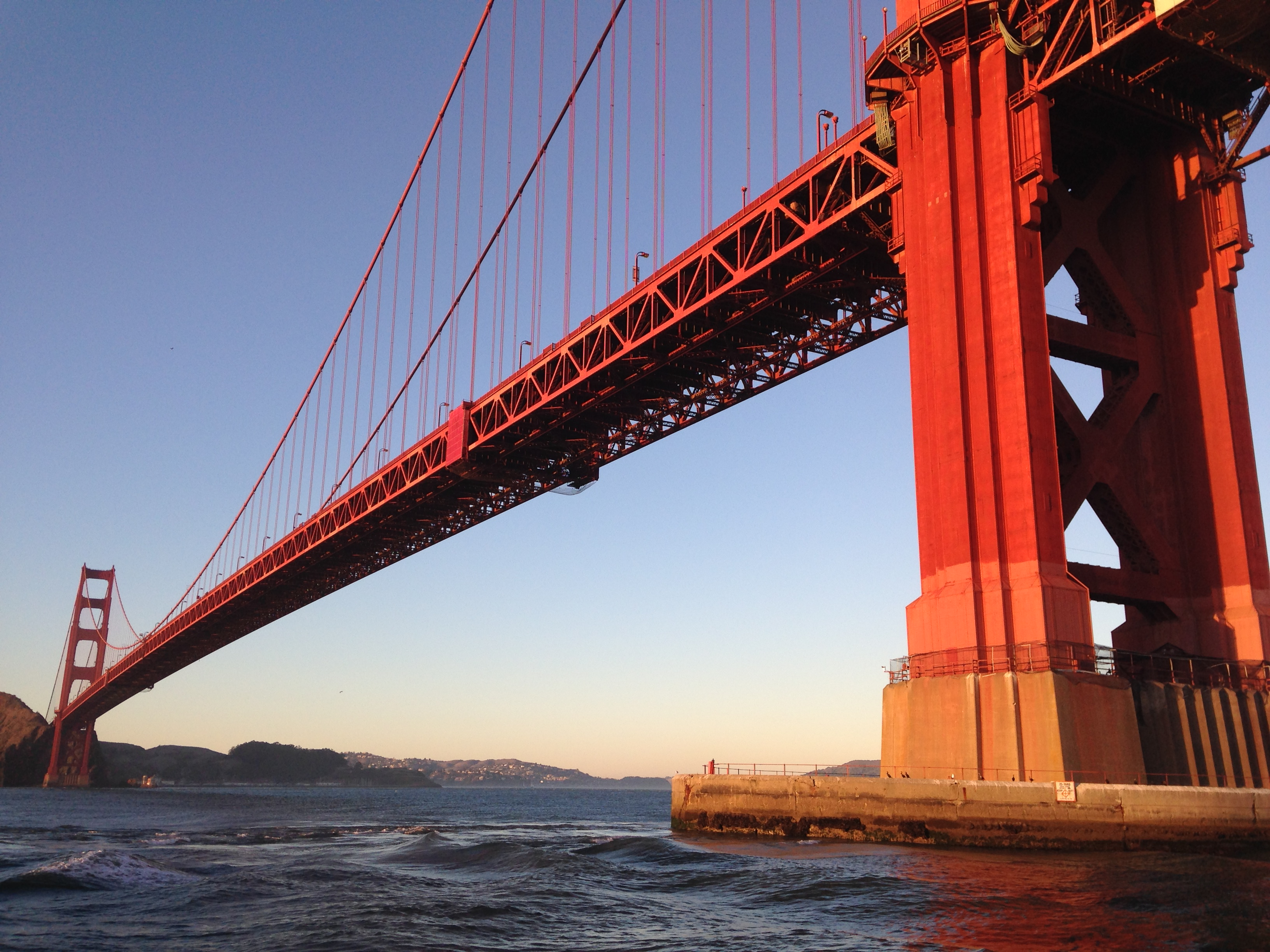
Golden Gate Bridge as seen from below

Between 1937 and 2026, an estimated 2,000 people have jumped to their deaths from the Golden Gate Bridge, located in the San Francisco Bay Area in the United States. The number is high enough for statisticians to compile figures on the precise cause of death. Prior to the installation of suicide prevention barriers, most would die instantly from internal injuries upon hitting the water, while a few would survive the impact and drown or die of hypothermia. A very small number have survived.

Installation of metal suicide barriers that stretch 20 feet out from the walkway was completed in January 2024. Additional prevention measures include telephone hotlines and patrols by emergency personnel and bridge workers.

== Prevention and intervention ==
Various methods have been tried to physically prevent people from jumping off the bridge. As of January 2024, it was fitted with a suicide prevention barrier and suicide-hotline telephones. Staff patrol the bridge in carts, looking for people who appear to be planning to jump. The bridge is closed to pedestrians at night. Cyclists are still permitted across at night, but are required to buzz themselves in and out through the remotely controlled security gates.

=== Suicide barriers ===
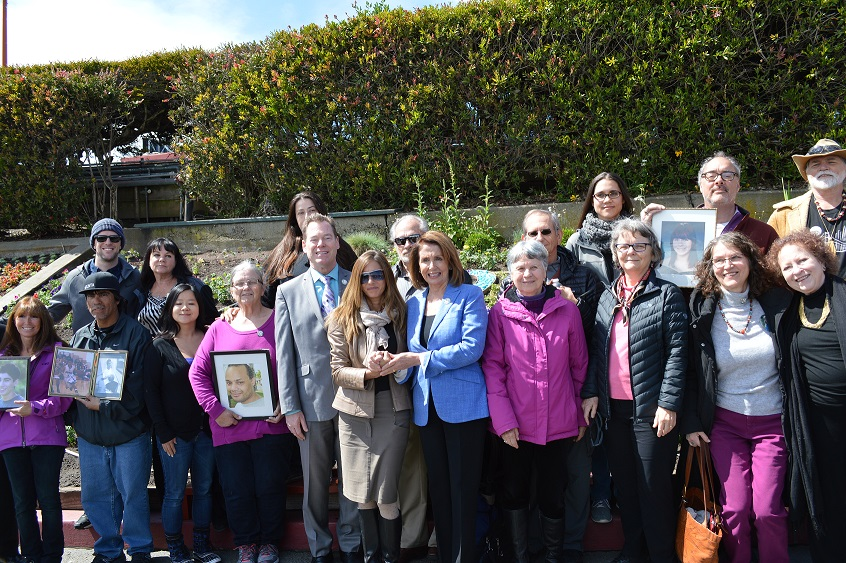
Representative Nancy Pelosi joins the families of Golden Gate Bridge suicide victims in 2017 to celebrate the construction of a suicide-prevention barrier on the bridge

On October 10, 2008, the Golden Gate Bridge and Transportation District Board of Directors voted 15 to 1 for the preferred option of installing a plastic-covered stainless steel net below the bridge as a suicide deterrent. The netting barrier was initially estimated to cost $40–50 million to complete and the Transportation District board voted against using any bridge funds to pay for the net. On July 28, 2010, the board received $5 million from the Metropolitan Transportation Commission (MTC) towards conducting a final design study of the barrier. However, a funding source for the overall project still had not been identified, and there was concern that this lack of funding could delay the net's deployment.

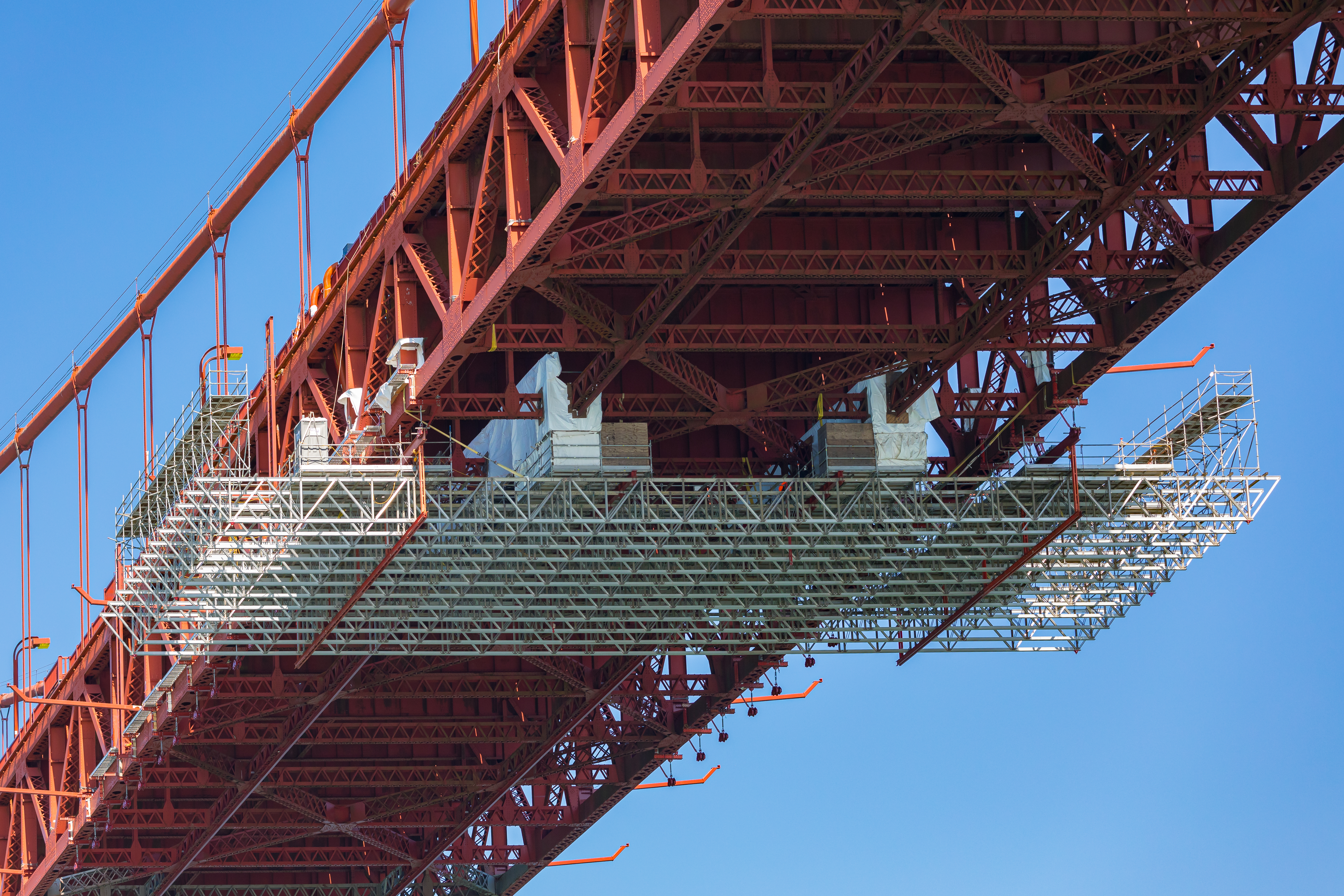
Installation of the suicide barriers, February 2020

The lack of funding for the project continued to delay the schedule of completion. In 2012, President Barack Obama enacted the Transportation Re-authorization Bill permitting federal funding towards transportation infrastructure projects. Initially, the bill did not divert funding automatically. However, advocates of the barrier, such as 'Bridge Rail Foundation', were eventually successful in securing support for the project in 2014. In 2014 the directors of the Bridge District voted to change its policy and allow the use of toll money to supplement governmental funds for a suicide barrier.

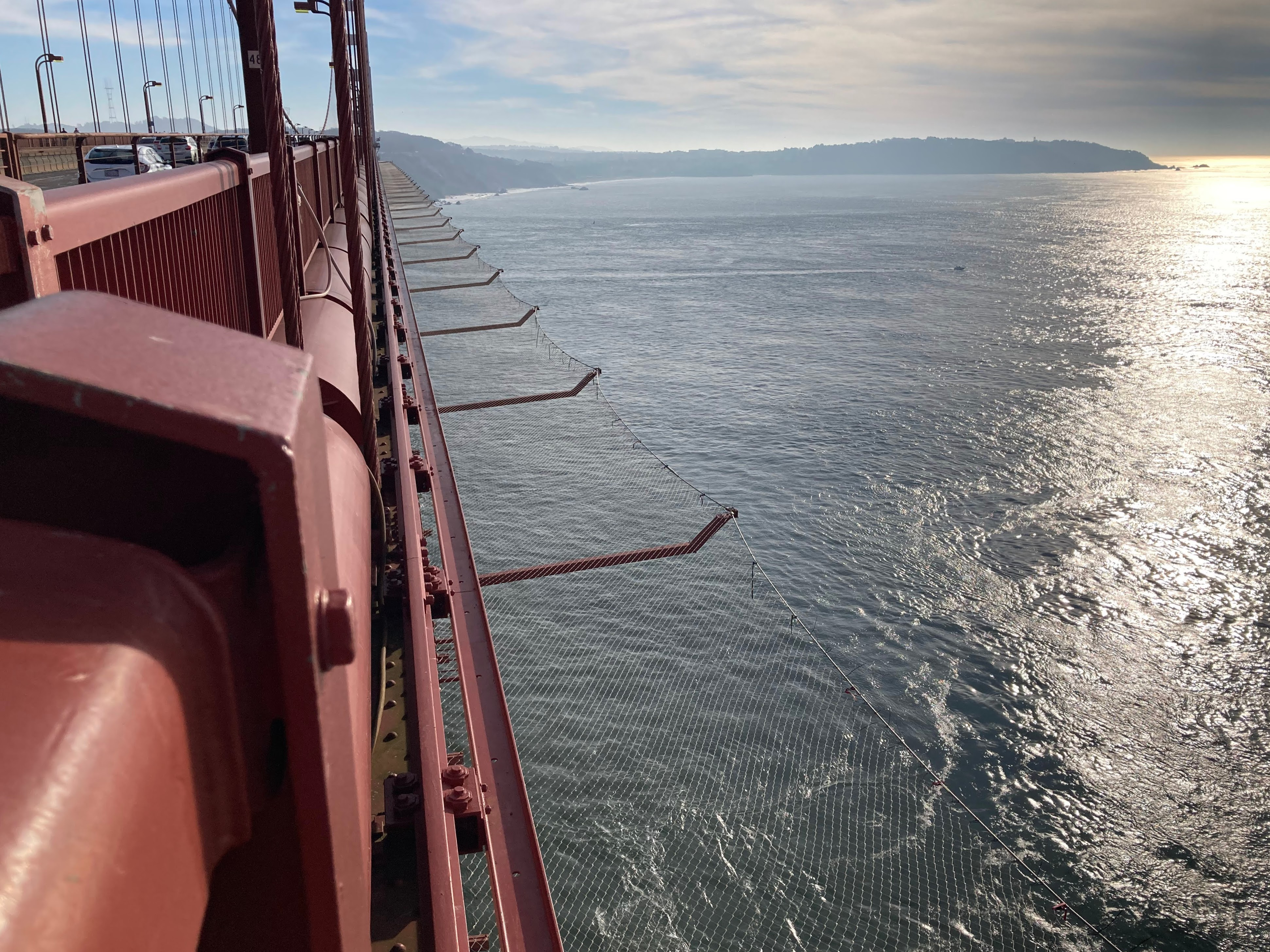
Suicide nets on the Pacific side of the Golden Gate Bridge in December 2022 during installation.

The suicide barrier consists of stainless steel netting stretching 20 feet (6.1 m) out on either side of the bridge, and 20 feet below the bridge. Funding for building this barrier was unanimously approved by the Golden Gate Bridge Board of Directors on June 27, 2014. The design was finalized in December 2014; however the project was delayed due to concerns from the National Park Service about storing construction materials at the site for the estimated three years it would take to complete the work.

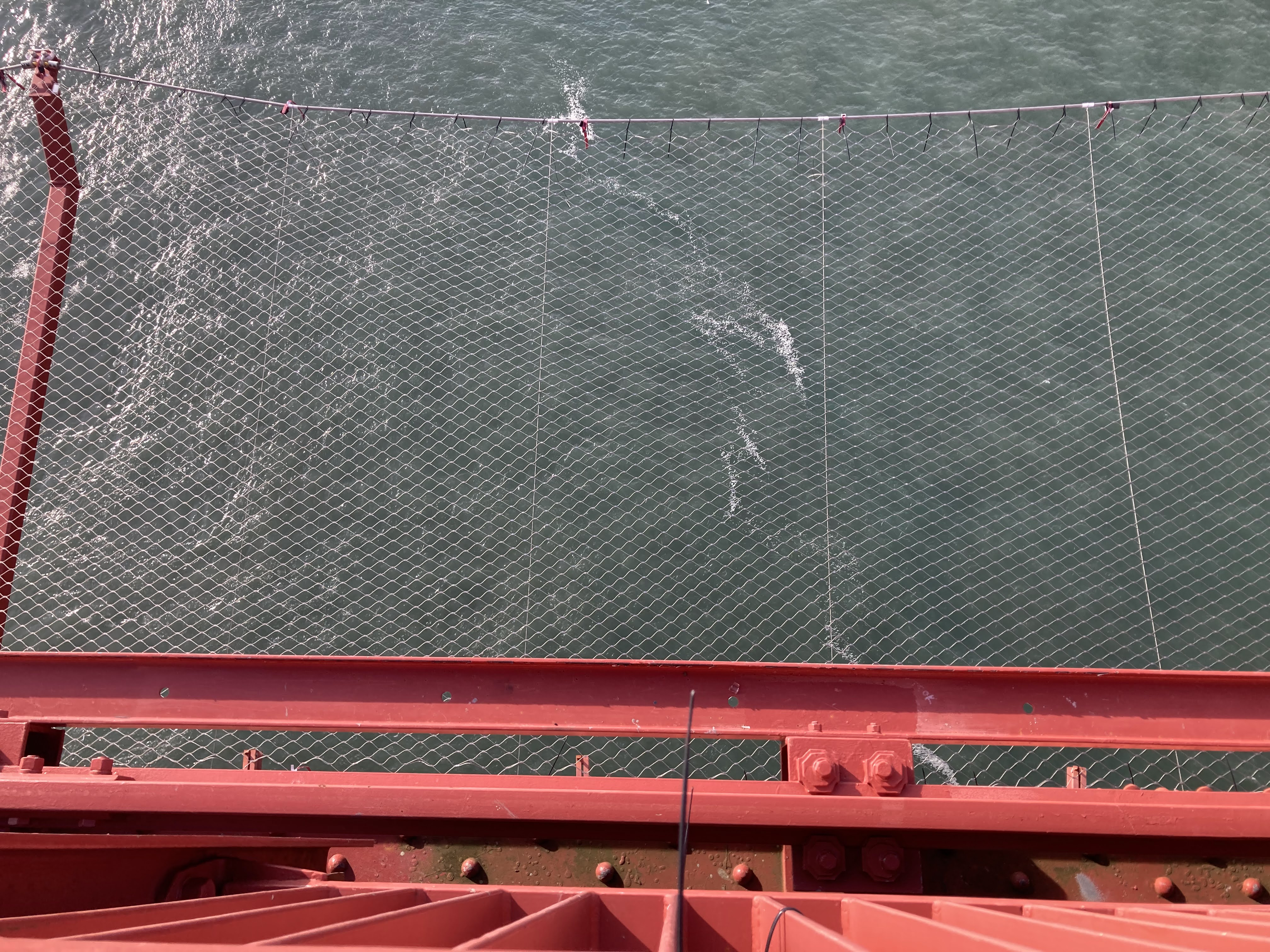
Suicide barrier on the Golden Gate Bridge in December 2022.

Fabrication of the stainless-steel netting and structural pieces began offsite in May 2017 and on-site installation began in August 2018. It was completed in January 2024. The netting was scheduled to be complete in 2021 at a projected cost of $211 million. In 2019, lead contractor AECOM reported a delay until 2023. District officials attributed the delay to the original lead contractor, Shimmick Construction, having underbid the project, and to its 2017 acquisition by AECOM.

Even during its construction, the new suicide prevention barrier had a significant effect in reducing number of jumpers. According to Denis Mulligan, general manager of the district "The net is designed not for a cushy landing but rather to inflict a painful, though nonlethal, injury on a jumper. While one function of the net is hindering anyone who does land on it from taking further action, the overriding aim is to deter people from jumping in the first place." "Suicidal people don't want to hurt themselves—they want to die," he said.

The nets have widely been considered successful, even convincing former skeptics. As of November 21, 2024, the Golden Gate Bridge Highway and Transportation District reported that the number of deaths by suicide year to date had been eight, down from an average 33.5. Through the end of October 2024, thwarted attempts were down from an annual average of 200 to 106. There were only four suicides, and none after May, in 2025.

=== Bridgewatch Angels ===
A volunteer group called the Bridgewatch Angels was founded by Pleasanton Police Lieutenant, Mia Munayer, in 2011. During every major holiday and while off-duty, Munayer mobilizes hundreds of volunteers to patrol the bridge looking for anyone who may be contemplating suicide. Before embarking on their morning or afternoon shifts, Bridgewatch Angels volunteers receive training on the warning signs of someone in crisis, indirect and direct ways to engage with people walking alone on the bridge, and safety protocol when interacting with a suicidal person requiring police intervention. Each Bridgewatch event is dedicated to the memory of a person who jumped from the Golden Gate Bridge and their family joins the Bridgewatch Angels as they walk together to honor the memory of their loved one. The Bridgewatch Angels are credited with making dozens of interventions each year.

=== Suicide rescue ===
In addition to Golden Gate bridge patrol, law enforcement, and emergency medical personnel, there are Golden Gate Bridge ironworkers who volunteer their time to prevent suicides by talking to or wrestling down suicidal people. One of the ironworkers, Ken Hopper, began working at the bridge in the mid-1980s and sees the volunteer rescue duty as "part of the job". Called "Cowboys of the Sky", they have the equipment and knowledge of the bridge, as well as the experience working at extreme heights, giving them the qualifications to go over the rail and assist those in need. While the experience of the volunteers minimizes the danger of falling, there are still risks encountered. Ironworkers have reported knives being pulled on them, seeing loaded guns on would-be jumpers, and having been bitten. When a police psychologist is on scene, they will coach the volunteer rescuers by radio and the ironworkers are provided seminars on suicide prevention. As of 2001, Hopper reported having rescued 30 suicidal individuals and losing two. He was a first-hand witness to the Steven Page murder/suicide, where a father, who had just murdered his wife, threw his toddler-daughter off the bridge and then jumped off the bridge himself.

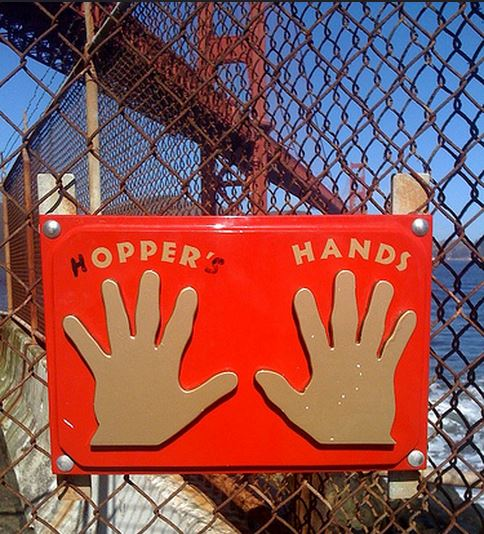
"Hopper's Hands", hand silhouettes of bridge ironworker and volunteer suicide rescue worker, Ken Hopper

"Hopper's Hands" were created in part as a legacy of the ironworkers volunteering for suicide rescue duty. After Hopper spotted waterfront joggers touching the fence at the sidewalk dead-end near Fort Point before turning back, he asked the bridge's sign painter to create a sign with two hand print silhouettes on it. The signs are now at both ends of the bridge.

Strong appeals for a suicide barrier, fence, or other preventive measures were raised again by a group of psychiatry professionals, suicide barrier consultants, and families of jumpers beginning in January 2005. These efforts were given momentum by two films dealing with the topic of suicide and the Golden Gate Bridge. On January 14, 2005, the San Francisco Chronicle published an open letter by writer–director Jenni Olson calling for a suicide barrier on the Golden Gate Bridge. The letter was, in part, an excerpt from the script of her film The Joy of Life, which world-premiered the following week, on January 20, 2005, at the Sundance Film Festival. The day before, on January 19, 2005, the Chronicle broke the news that filmmaker Eric Steel had been shooting suicide leaps from the bridge during 2004 for his film The Bridge, which would be released in 2006. A week later, The Joy of Life world-premiered at the Sundance Film Festival and video copies of the film were circulated to members of the Bridge District board of directors with the help of the Psychiatric Foundation of Northern California.

In the fall of 2005 the San Francisco Chronicle published a seven-part series of articles, titled "Lethal Beauty", focusing on the problem of suicide and the Golden Gate Bridge and emphasizing that a solution was not just possible, but even desirable.

California Highway patrolman Kevin Briggs is credited with saving hundreds of lives of would-be jumpers by talking to them before they can take the plunge. Prior to the installation of nets, the CHP estimated that with the help of cameras and the volunteers, at least 80–90% of people intending to jump did not do so.

== Background ==
Suicides mapped by location, as of 2005

Official count of the jumpers ended in 1995, with a total of 997 jumpers.

The deck of the bridge is about 245 feet (75 m) above the water. After a fall of four seconds, jumpers hit the water at around 75 mph (120 km/h). Most of the jumpers die due to impact trauma. About 5% of the jumpers survive the initial impact but generally drown or die of hypothermia in the cold water. Most suicidal jumps from the bridge have occurred on the side facing the bay (the side facing the Pacific is open only to bicyclists).

An official suicide count was kept until the year 1995, sorted according to which of the bridge's 128 lamp posts the jumper was nearest when they jumped. The official count ended on June 5, 1995, on the 997th jump; jumper No. 1000, Eric Atkinson (25), jumped on July 3, 1995. Consequently, Marin County coroner Ken Holmes asked local media to stop reporting the total number of jumpers. By 2012 the unofficial count exceeded 1,600 (in which the body was recovered or someone saw the jump) and new suicides were occurring about once every two weeks, according to a San Francisco Chronicle analysis. The most suicides in one month were in August 2013, when 10 jumped. The total count for the year 2013 was 46, with an additional 118 attempts prevented, making it the year with the highest tally so far. The rate of incidence of attempts has risen to nearly one every other day.

For comparison, the Aokigahara Forest in Japan has a record of 108 bodies, found within the forest in 2004, with an average of 30 a year. There were 34 bridge-jump suicides in 2006 whose bodies were recovered, in addition to four jumps that were witnessed but whose bodies were never recovered, and several bodies recovered suspected to be from bridge jumps. The California Highway Patrol removed 70 apparently suicidal people from the bridge that year.

There is no accurate figure on the number of suicides or completed jumps since 1937, because many were not witnessed. People have been known to travel to San Francisco specifically to jump off the bridge, and may take a bus or taxicab to the site; policemen sometimes find abandoned rental cars in the parking lot. Currents beneath the bridge are strong and some jumpers have more than likely been washed out to sea without being seen.

Dimensions of the Golden Gate Bridge span from end to end, looking West (out to sea)

The fatality rate of jumping is roughly 98%. As of July 2013, only 34 people are known to have survived the jump. Those who do survive strike the water feet-first and at a slight angle, although individuals may still sustain broken bones or internal injuries. One young woman, Sarah Rutledge Birnbaum, survived, but returned to jump again and died the second time. One young man survived a jump in 1979, swam to shore, and drove himself to a hospital. The impact cracked several of his vertebrae.

The Golden Gate Bridge was referred to by American author and journalist Krista Tippett as a "suicide magnet." Engineering professor Natalie Jeremijenko, as part of her "Bureau of Inverse Technology" art collective, created a "Despondency Index" by correlating the Dow Jones Industrial Average with the number of jumpers detected by "Suicide Boxes" containing motion-detecting cameras, which she claimed to have set up under the bridge. The boxes purportedly recorded 17 jumps in three months, far greater than the official count. The Whitney Museum, although questioning whether Jeremijenko's suicide-detection technology actually existed, nevertheless included her project in its Whitney Biennial.

== Incidents ==
=== Harold B. Wobber ===
The first known intentional death from the Golden Gate Bridge occurred when the bridge was just a little over three months past its opening. In August 1937, 47-year-old World War I veteran Harold Wobber was employed as a bargeman and took a bus to the bridge. After he got off the bus, Wobber started down the pedestrian walkway of the 1.7-mile span. On the way, he started talking to Dr. Lewis Neylor, a college professor from Connecticut on vacation in the San Francisco area. Wobber remarked, "It's a great day for what I'm about to do. You'll see." During the stroll, Wobber took off his coat and vest, threw them to Neylor, and declared, "This is where I get off. I'm going to jump." Neylor grabbed the man's belt, but Wobber was able to get free and jumped over the four-foot-high rail to his death in the San Francisco Bay. After his death, newspapers reported Wobber was "a victim of shell shock" who had been undergoing mental health treatment.

Newspaper clipping from the San Francisco Examiner of the youngest death, Marilyn DeMont (5)

=== August and Marilyn DeMont ===
One of the youngest deaths off the bridge was five-year-old Marilyn DeMont, in 1945. With the child standing on a girder just outside the bridge's railing, her father, 37-year-old elevator installation foreman August DeMont, commanded her to jump. He followed by diving in after her. A simple note was found in the DeMont car stating, "I and my daughter have committed suicide."

=== Charles S. Gallagher Sr. and Jr. ===
In 1954, Charles S. Gallagher Sr. was director of the San Jose Merchants Association in San Jose, California. After returning from two weeks of vacation, he discovered the audit his company began before he left was ongoing. On September 27, 1954, Gallagher told his co-workers he was leaving briefly to get coffee. Rather than doing so, he drove to the north side of the Golden Gate Bridge, parked, and jumped.

Two days later, on September 29, 1954 Gallagher's 24-year-old son, Charles S. Gallagher Jr., drove the same sedan owned by his father to the same area and jumped from approximately the same location. A pre-med student at UCLA, Gallagher Jr. left a note that said, "I am sorry. . . . I want to keep dad company."

=== 500th and 501st victims ===
The 500th jumper was Steven Houg, 26 years old, who made the leap to death on October 10, 1973. The 501st, a woman who jumped October 11, was not immediately identified.

=== Marc Salinger ===
Twenty-eight-year-old Marc Salinger, oldest son of former Kennedy Administration press secretary Pierre Salinger, jumped to his death from the bridge on February 9, 1977. While Salinger had known John F. Kennedy through his father's professional association with the president, he had also known him on a personal level. According to his family, Salinger, who had occasionally been Kennedy's golf caddy, never got over the president's assassination. After Salinger's mother had identified the body, the San Francisco Coroner's Office announced Salinger's death to the press. A resident of the San Francisco Bay Area at the time of his death, Salinger was buried in San Mateo County.

=== Steven and Kellie Page ===
On January 28, 1993, Steven Page murdered his wife Nancy and then threw his 3-year-old daughter Kellie off the Golden Gate Bridge, before jumping off the bridge himself.

Page worked as a buyer at Ogawa-Mune Nursery in Fremont, California. The Page family home was in Fremont, but Page maintained a separate apartment after he and his wife separated. At 10:00 a.m. on January 28, Page drove to their Fremont house and murdered his wife with a 12-gauge shotgun. He then left a message for his mother-in-law to pick up his nine-year-old stepson from school. After arriving at the Page home, she discovered the body of her daughter. Page, after killing his wife, drove with their three-year-old daughter, Kellie, to the Golden Gate Bridge. Highway patrol officers noticed Page walking along the bridge carrying a bundle and recognized it to be a small child. After being approached by the officers because of his unusual behavior, Page threw Kellie over the railing, then climbed over the railing himself and jumped off. Following the incident, investigators were puzzled by Page's apparent lack of psychological indicators prior to the murder/suicide.

U.S. Coast Guard spokesperson Shelly Freier stated the USCG had recovered the bodies of both father and daughter. An apology letter addressed to Page's stepson, who was at school at the time of all three deaths, was found at the family home. In the letter Page apologized for what he had done, showing premeditation for both the murders of his wife and daughter as well as his suicide.

=== Roy Raymond ===
On August 26, 1993, Roy Raymond, the founder of Victoria's Secret, died after intentionally jumping off the Golden Gate Bridge at the age of 46. Last seen walking toward the bridge, Raymond's body was shortly thereafter washed up on a shoreline in Marin County; investigators concluded that he had killed himself by jumping from the bridge.

=== Paul Aladdin Alarab ===
Originally surviving a fall from the Golden Gate in 1988, Paul Aladdin Alarab died on March 19, 2003, when he jumped from the bridge in protest of the United States' invasion of Iraq. Alarab, whose father was born in Iraq, was a 44-year-old real estate agent from Kensington, California, who climbed over a railing on the East (Bay) side of the bridge, mid-span. Tying one end of a rope to the bridge and wrapping the other end of the rope around his arms, Alarab then demanded to talk to media. Law enforcement tried to talk him back over the railing while he read a statement he had written denouncing the war, which had started earlier that day. After finishing the statement, he let go of the rope and fell 235 feet (72 m) to the water. His body was recovered almost immediately.

In 1988, however, he had survived a similar fall from the bridge that occurred while lowering himself into a garbage can that was hanging from a 60-foot (18 m) rope off the bridge. At that time, he was protesting what he saw as mistreatment of elderly and disabled people. In the 1988 incident, he lost his grip on the rope and fell into San Francisco Bay, surviving with three broken ribs and both lungs collapsed. The first incident was considered an accident. Following the 1988 incident, Alarab told a reporter from the San Francisco Chronicle, "It seemed like the fall lasted forever. I was praying for God to give me another chance. I was also wondering about how I would hit, because that is what determines if you will live or die." While his friends, family, and co-workers did not believe his death was an intentional suicide, investigators came to a different conclusion based on his having let go of the rope. Retired University of California, San Francisco (UCSF) professor of psychiatry Jerome Motto stated that Alarab might have been disturbed by the outbreak of the war and "that previously bearable pain suddenly became intolerable."

=== Casey Joanna Brooks ===
On January 29, 2008, 17-year-old Casey Brooks of Tiburon, jumped from the Golden Gate Bridge. Because her body was never recovered, her friend had benches installed as a memorial. Located on Strawberry Vista in Mill Valley, the original memorial had to be replaced due to a dispute with the owner of the property the bench was located on being uncomfortable. In March and April 2020, the benches were vandalized twice. Her father, John Brooks has written a book, The Girl Behind the Door, on their experience of losing Casey.

=== Sean Moylan ===
On June 5, 2014, at 4:22 p.m, 27-year-old Sean Moylan of Novato, California, jumped from the Golden Gate Bridge, losing his life. The Coast Guard pulled Moylan's body out of the waters beneath the bridge. Moylan was the grandson of John Moylan, a longtime member of the Golden Gate District board of directors who campaigned for the installation of suicide barriers on the bridge. The elder Moylan was president of the board when, in 2008, a historic decision was made to build the barrier at a cost of $68 million. John Moylan referred to his grandson's death as "heartbreaking"; however, he did not blame it on the lack of a barrier. Sean Moylan already had attempted suicide in February 2014; after a breakup with his girlfriend, Moylan walked in front of a truck in Oregon and was critically injured.

== False suicides and survivors ==
Along with confirmed suicide deaths and suicide attempts at the bridge, there have been false suicides as well. The first documented case of "pseudocide" at the Golden Gate Bridge was in 1948. Forty-seven-year-old Chris J. Christensen was a well-known local jeweler who had been recently elected to the San Francisco Board of Supervisors. Christensen's coat was found attached to a work box at the center span of the bridge with a note in the coat that read, "Loved Ones: My nerves are shot. Please forgive me. Chris." Believed to have jumped from the bridge, Christensen was declared dead and rumors abounded. Investigators concluded he was unable to cope with the pressures of being in public office. There were reports of Christensen having become friendly with a man described as "willowy ... almost too good-looking to be considered handsome." While Christensen introduced the man to friends and colleagues as his nephew, it was learned the man was not a relative; rather, he was a Navy sailor whom Christensen met in a Los Angeles bar. Over a year had passed when it was discovered Christensen was actually alive and selling Bibles in Houston, Texas. Found living in a low-rent rooming house and having lost 40 pounds (18 kg), Christensen explained that campaign contributors who supported his election had asked him to "do things he couldn't do." Christensen saw himself as a failure and never returned to San Francisco.

In 1985, 28-year-old Kenneth Baldwin jumped over and survived. Rescued by the US Coast Guard, he suffered a few broken ribs and a bruised lung.

On September 25, 2000, Kevin Hines was 19 years old, paranoid, and hallucinating when he jumped off the Golden Gate Bridge. Throwing himself headfirst over the bridge railing, he fell 220 feet (67 m) into San Francisco Bay. During the fall, his body rotated so that when he hit the water, he was in a sitting position, taking the impact in his legs and up through his back. Three of his vertebrae were shattered, lacerating his lower internal organs. A United States Coast Guard vessel rescued him, and he was transported to a hospital in San Francisco where he received emergency surgery. Following further, experimental surgery, he made a complete recovery. Regarding his thoughts after the jump, he later said, "There was a millisecond of free fall. In that instant, I thought, what have I just done? I don't want to die. God, please save me." Following his suicide attempt, he appeared in a documentary film, The Bridge (2006), and was interviewed on CNN by Larry King. Hines wrote a book about his experience before and after his suicide attempt, Cracked, Not Broken, and became a mental health advocate and proponent for a bridge suicide barrier or net to prevent such incidents.

On March 10, 2011, 17-year-old Luhe "Otter" Vilagomez from Windsor High School in Windsor, California, survived a jump from the bridge, breaking his coccyx and puncturing one lung, though he said his attempt was for "fun" and not suicide. The teen was helped to shore by Frederic Lecouturier, 55, who was surfing under the bridge when he saw Vilagomez jump. The California Highway Patrol recommended the San Francisco District Attorney's Office charge the student with misdemeanor trespassing (a charge that entails climbing any rail, cable, suspender rope, tower or superstructure not intended for public use), punishable by up to a year in the county jail and/or a fine up to $10,000, and that the teenager undergo a medical/psychiatric evaluation by medical professionals.

On December 27, 2022, Thorton "Thor" McKay, a 23-year-old student at Santa Rosa Junior College, survived a jump from the bridge.

== Film documentaries ==
=== The Bridge ===
The Bridge is a 2006 British–American documentary film by Eric Steel, which spans 365 days of filming at the San Francisco Golden Gate Bridge in 2004. The film captured a number of suicides, and featured interviews with family and friends of some of the identified people who had thrown themselves from the bridge that year.

The film was inspired by Tad Friend's 2003 article titled "Jumpers", written for The New Yorker magazine. The film crew shot almost 10,000 hours of footage, recording 23 of the known 24 suicides off the bridge in 2004.

In his article for The New Yorker, Friend wrote, "Survivors often regret their decision in midair, if not before". This observation is supported by survivor Ken Baldwin, who explained, "I instantly realized that everything in my life that I'd thought was unfixable was totally fixable—except for having just jumped."

The 2006 release of The Bridge exerted additional pressure on the Bridge District and created continued public awareness. The film also documented interviews with surviving family members of those who jumped, with witnesses, and with a survivor.

=== The Joy of Life ===
The Joy of Life, released in 2005, is an American documentary film that recounts the chronological history of suicide at the Golden Gate Bridge. The film discusses key design changes made to the bridge by architect Irving Morrow, notably the lowering of the pedestrian railing. It also explores the public discussions of the problem of suicide prevention over the decades, with a focus on local news coverage.

== See also ==
- Golden Gate Bridge Suicides - Demographics
- Unofficial list of jumpers 1937 - 2008 (Notice: May not open correctly in Mozilla Firefox.)
