= Jumping off a bridge =

Jumping off a bridge may refer to:

- BASE jumping, a recreational sport which uses parachutes for safe landing
- A means of committing suicide by jumping from height

== See also ==
- Suicides at the Golden Gate Bridge
