= Kevin Briggs =

American police officer and humanitarian

Sergeant Kevin Briggs (also known as the Guardian of the Golden Gate Bridge) is a California Highway Patrol officer noted for his work in suicide intervention, having dissuaded more than two hundred people from jumping off the Golden Gate Bridge into San Francisco Bay. In 2013, Briggs retired from the California Highway Patrol to focus his efforts on suicide prevention.

== Biography ==
Kevin Briggs joined the United States Army in 1981 and served for 3 years. In 1987, he became a correctional officer working at Soledad and San Quentin prisons. Briggs graduated from the California Highway Patrol Academy in 1990. In 1994 he began patrolling the Golden Gate Bridge, estimating that he had dissuaded roughly two per month from committing suicide. Two people did jump after his intercession.

In 2003, Briggs described a typical conversation — starting by asking how the person is doing, then asking their plans for the following day. He would ask "are you here to hurt yourself?" If they did not have plans for the next day, he'd try to make plans with them, inviting them to come back to the bridge if their plan did not work out at the end of the day.

In May 2013, the American Foundation for Suicide Prevention recognized the California Highway Patrol with a public service award in suicide prevention. Briggs accepted the award on behalf of the California Highway Patrol. In November 2013, NBC News chronicled Briggs and reported on his impending retirement. After his retirement from the California Highway Patrol, he plans on focusing his work on suicide prevention.

== Bibliography ==
- Briggs, Kevin (2015). Guardian of the Golden Gate: Protecting the Line Between Hope and Despair. Overland Park, Kansas: Ascend Books. ISBN 978-0-99043-757-4.

== See also ==
- Law enforcement in the United States
- Don Ritchie
- Yukio Shige
- Chen Si
- Suicides at the Golden Gate Bridge
