= Genevieve Mora =

New Zealand activist (born 1994)

Genevieve Mora (also known as Genevieve Mora Holder, born September 19, 1994) is a New Zealand mental health activist and co-founder of Voices of Hope, a story-telling based platform that focuses on suicide prevention. She has authored numerous books promoting mental health, hosted podcasts and co-founded the eating disorder resource app Love Your Kite. Mora currently serves as the general manager for Voices of Hope. She continues to contribute to the mental health community through sharing her own journey battling mental illness and has received numerous awards for her work.

== Personal life ==
Genevieve Mora was born on September 19, 1994, in Auckland, New Zealand. She has been open about her battle with mental illness throughout her childhood and adolescence. Mora states that she first developed anxiety at age ten before being diagnosed with obsessive–compulsive disorder (OCD) at age thirteen and later was diagnosed with anorexia nervosa. She received intensive treatment for her eating disorder and was in and out of Starship Hospital for nearly two years receiving care. Since then she states that she is doing well and continues to share her story through her career to help others.

In September 2014, Mora moved to Los Angeles to pursue acting at the Lee Strasberg Theatre and Film Institute. She has since appeared in the film Reporting Live (2013), Camp-Off (2014) and numerous commercials and short films. Mora currently lives back in Auckland, New Zealand focusing on her work for the organization Voices of Hope. She recently married her fiancé Izak Holder

== Career, actions and defining experiences ==
Along with fellow mental health activist Jazz Thornton, Mora founded the organization Voices of Hope in 2014. Voices of Hope serves as an online platform to share the lived experiences of individuals who faced battles with mental health. Through the organization people are able to post a video telling the story of their journey in hopes of inspiring others to keep fighting. One campaign that Voices of Hope spearheaded is "Behind the Jersey" which encourages athletes to have open dialogue about their mental health and seek support when needed. On this project Voices of Hope collaborated with numerous professional athletes such as Jack Salt, former professional basketball player, Alrie Meleisea boxer and MMA fighter, and Tayla Clement former Paralympian to name a few. Other campaigns Voices of Hope have led are "How are you, really?" and "You wouldn't say it to their face".

Genevieve Mora's primary job is serving as the general manager of Voices of Hope. Additionally, through the organization she hosts her own podcast and participates in campaigns that go into schools and other community groups to raise awareness surrounding mental health. Mora maintains a large social media presence through her YouTube Channel, Instagram and TikTok accounts to advocate for mental health resources and share her own journey to inspire others that they can get to the other side of their mental health battles.

She also serves on the External Eating Disorder Advisory Board of New Zealand as their lived-experience advocate. In 2018 Genevieve Mora and her co-founder of Voices of Hope Jazz Thornton, participated in a meeting with various mental health initiatives from across New Zealand. The discussion took place at Maranui Cafe in Wellington New Zealand and deliberated the mental health crisis in the nation. They were joined by organizations such as Key to Life, Lifeline and the national helpline service 1737 as well as Prince Harry and Meghan Markle who were on their Australian leg of the tour.

In February 2021 Mora released the eating disorder resource app Love Your Kite that she co-founded with Hannah Hardy-Jones. Mora helped to adapt Hardy-Jones's Kite Program, an initiative founded by Hardy Jones that provides self-development for wellbeing and mental illness for eating disorder treatment. As of August 2021 the app had over 1000 users internationally and was acknowledged by the Butterfly Foundation a prominent eating disorder resource organization in Australia.

== Legacy and awards ==
Organization	Year	Category	Nominated work	Result	Reference
Westfield St Lukes	2019	Westfield Local Hero	Herself	Won	
Points of Light	2020	142nd Commonwealth Points of Light Award	Film 'Dear Suicidal Me' with Jazz Thornton	Won	
Inspiring Stories	2021	Impact Award	Love Your Kite	Finalist	
Forbes	2022	30 Under 30 in Asia	Herself	Won	
Kiwibank New Zealander of the Year Awards	2022	Young New Zealander of the Year	Herself	Won	

== Publications and other works ==
Genevieve Mora has also produced numerous literary works surrounding mental health and treatment. She co-authored My Journey Starts Here: A Guided Journal to Improve Your Mental Well-Being with Jazz Thornton which was released worldwide on January 5, 2021. The book is meant to serve as a practical guide for eating disorder recovery with inspirational quotes, coping mechanisms and spaces for creative outlet. On July 4, 2023, Mora released her own book Bite Back: A compassionate guide to navigating Eating Disorders. Bite back is a three part novel that describes her own battle with OCD, anorexia, anxiety, tips for those struggling and how their loved ones can provide support and other stories of recovery. Together Thornton and Mora constructed the film 'Dear Suicidal Me' which had over 80 million views as of 2020.
