= Don Ritchie =

Australian humanitarian and suicide preventionist (1926–2012)

Don Ritchie OAM
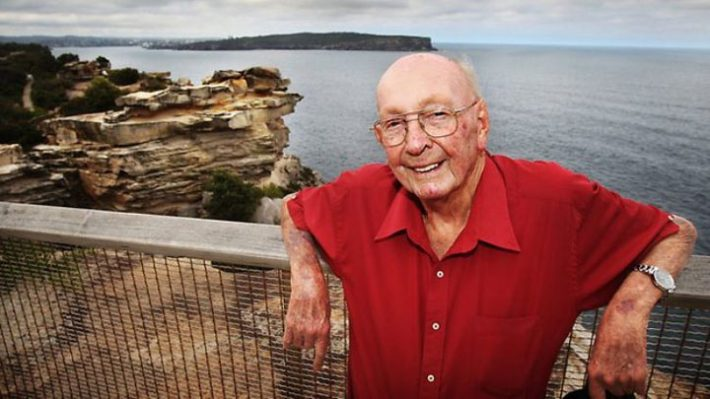
- Born: Donald Taylor Ritchie; 9 June 1926; Vaucluse, New South Wales, Australia
- Died: 13 May 2012 (aged 85); Darlinghurst, New South Wales, Australia
- Education: Scots College
- Occupations: Costing clerk, salesman
- Military career
- Branch: Royal Australian Navy
- Service years: 1944–1946
- Rank: Able seaman

Donald Taylor Ritchie OAM (9 June 1926 – 13 May 2012) was an Australian man who intervened in many suicide attempts. He officially rescued at least 160 people but his family says he helped save up to 500 people who had intended to attempt suicide at The Gap.

== Early life ==
Ritchie went to Vaucluse Public School and attended Scots College. He enlisted into the Royal Australian Navy on 30 June 1944 as a seaman aboard HMAS Hobart and witnessed the unconditional surrender of the Japanese Imperial Forces in Tokyo Bay on 2 September 1945, officially ending World War II in the Pacific.

After the war, he was a life insurance salesman.

== Intervention ==
Officially, he rescued 160 people from suicide as of 2009 over a 45-year period, although his family claims the number is closer to 500. Ritchie resided next to The Gap, a location in Sydney, Australia, known for multiple suicide attempts.

Upon seeing someone on the cliff in distress, Ritchie would cross the road from his property and engage them in conversation, often beginning with the words, "Can I help you in some way?" Afterwards Ritchie would invite them back to his home for a cup of tea and a chat. Some of the people he helped would return years later to thank him for his efforts in talking them out of their decision.

Ritchie explained his intervention in suicide attempts saying, "You can't just sit there and watch them."

== Awards ==
In 2006, he was awarded the Medal of the Order of Australia for his rescues, the official citation being for "service to the community through programs to prevent suicide". Ritchie and his wife Moya were also named "Citizens of the Year" for 2010 by Woollahra Council, the local government authority responsible for the Gap. He received Local Hero Award for Australia in 2011, the National Australia Day Council saying: "His kind words and invitations into his home in times of trouble have made an enormous difference... With such simple actions, Don has saved an extraordinary number of lives." On Friday the 14th of June 2013, Waverley Municipal Council dedicated the Don Ritchie Grove in the Gap Park, the memorial was inscribed with the quote, "Always remember the power of the simple smile, a helping hand, a listening ear, and a kind word."

- Don Ritchie (9. 06. 1926 - 13 .05. 2012)”

== Death ==
Ritchie died on 13 May 2012, at the age of 85. He is survived by his wife Moya and their three daughters.

== See also ==
- Suicide prevention
- Chen Si
- Kevin Briggs
- Yukio Shige
