= Yukio Shige =

Japanese retired police officer and nonprofit organisation head

Yukio Shige (茂幸雄, Shige Yukio) is a retired Japanese police officer and head of an NPO that works to prevent suicides at the Tōjinbō cliffs in Fukui Prefecture in Japan. His work and that of the NPO is believed to have saved over 750 lives. He is known as the "chotto matte" ("Wait a moment") man, for the words he says to people considering suicide.

== Police career ==
Shige worked as a police officer for the Fukui Prefectural Police for 42 years, retiring at the age of 60. His final posting was in Tōjinbō in Sakai. He was appalled by the many corpses he had to remove from the ocean. On one of his last patrols before retirement in 2003, he met an elderly Tokyo couple who owned a pub. They had major debt problems and were suicidal. They planned to throw themselves into the sea at sunset. He convinced them not to, and called a patrol car to take them to the local welfare bureau. The local authorities simply gave the couple enough money to get to the next town. He received a letter from them, sent shortly before their suicide in Nagaoka, Niigata, five days after he had encountered them. He was offended by the coldness of the authorities, and after his retirement began to patrol the cliffs to try and prevent suicides.

== Suicide prevention NPO ==
On April 27, 2004, Shige founded Kokoro ni Hibiku Bunshu Henshukyoku (Publishing bureau for collection of writings that reach the heart), which has continued to work to prevent suicides around Tōjinbō. In 2014 it saved its 500th life.

In 2008 Shige reported a spike in suicide attempts after job losses among casual employees due to the 2008 financial crisis, known as the "Lehman shock" in Japan. In Japan, it is not uncommon for employees to live in a company dormitory, so if workers lose their jobs they also lose their housing.

The NPO owns six apartments where people can stay if they lack accommodation.

During the 2016 Pokémon Go fad, the number of local visitors increased, reducing the number of suicidal visitors to the Tojinbo cliffs.

In 2017 the group's 16 members were considering using drones to monitor the cliffs and watch for suicidal people. As of May 2017 the group had prevented 586 people from killing themselves.

== Popular culture ==
In 2015 it was reported that Shige's work would be featured in a documentary. In 2017, Shige and his team of volunteers at NPO were featured in a YouTube documentary by Field of Vision entitled "The Gatekeeper."

Another documentary was released in 2018, made by the French director Blaise Perrin. It is titled La Ronde ("The Round").

The story of Yukio Shige also inspired a French novel, Le Cœur régulier (published in 2010), which was then adapted to cinema under the same name (but renamed "Kokoro" for the US audience).

== See also ==
- Chen Si
- Don Ritchie
- Kevin Briggs
- Suicide in Japan
