= The Bridge (2006 documentary film) =

- Directed by: Eric Steel
- Written by: Eric Steel
- Produced by: Eric Steel
- Cinematography: Peter McCandless
- Edited by: Sabine Krayenbühl
- Music by: Alex Heffes
- Distributed by: IFC Films
- Release dates: April 2006 (San Francisco International Film Festival); October 27, 2006 (United States); February 16, 2007 (United Kingdom)
- Running time: 95 minutes
- Countries: United Kingdom; United States
- Language: English
- Budget: $25,000
- Box office: $205,724

The Bridge is a 2006 documentary film by Eric Steel spanning one year of filming at the Golden Gate Bridge which crosses the Golden Gate entrance to San Francisco Bay, connecting the city of San Francisco, California, to the Marin Headlands of Marin County, in 2004. The film shows a number of suicides, and features interviews with family and friends of some of the identified people who had thrown themselves from the bridge that year and one person who had jumped previously and survived.

The film was inspired by a 2003 article titled "Jumpers", written by Tad Friend for The New Yorker magazine. The film crew shot almost 10,000 hours of footage, recording 23 of the known 24 suicides off the bridge in 2004.

== Background ==
The Golden Gate Bridge, which first opened in May 1937, was the most popular suicide site in the world during the documentary's filming, with approximately 1,200 deaths by 2003. Its death toll has since been surpassed only by the Nanjing Yangtze River Bridge in China.

The four-second fall from the Golden Gate Bridge sends a person plunging 245 feet (75 m) at 75 miles per hour (121 km/h) to hit the waters of the San Francisco Bay "with the force of a speeding truck meeting a concrete building." Jumping off the bridge holds a 98 percent fatality rate; some die instantly from internal injuries, while others drown or die of hypothermia.

In his article for The New Yorker, Tad Friend wrote, "Survivors often regret their decision in midair, if not before", supported by survivor Ken Baldwin explaining, "I instantly realized that everything in my life that I'd thought was unfixable was totally fixable—except for having just jumped."

In the 1970s, the city's newspapers sparked "countdowns" as the death toll closed in on 500 recorded fatalities. Television crews covered the scene as bridge officials managed to stop 14 prospective jumpers, among them a man with a sign reading "500" pinned to his T-shirt. The media frenzy was even more intense in 1995 as the total drew close to 1,000. The body of the 1,000th victim, a 25-year-old who was seen jumping, remains unrecovered.

Steel said he was shocked that, despite the Golden Gate Bridge's notoriety and history, nothing had been done to prevent people from attempting suicide there. "Most bridges where, or high places, if it's high enough that it would be a fatal fall, have put up suicide barriers precisely for this reason." Suicide deterrent barriers have since been installed on the bridge. Construction of these barriers began in 2018.

== Production and filming ==
Steel steered clear of publicity about the project to avoid a situation where someone would "get it into his or her head to go to the bridge and immortalize him or herself on film." The camera crew consisted of 10 to 12 people who filmed the bridge day and night throughout 2004, using telephoto and wide-angle cameras.

In the first few months of filming, the crew captured only splashes in the water and only knew someone had jumped when the Coast Guard arrived. The first jumper caught with the telephoto lens was not behaving as filmmakers expected—crying and weeping—but, rather, was jogging, talking on his cellphone and laughing; he then suddenly put his things away and leaped to his death. During filming, on average, one person jumped off the Golden Gate Bridge every 15 days.

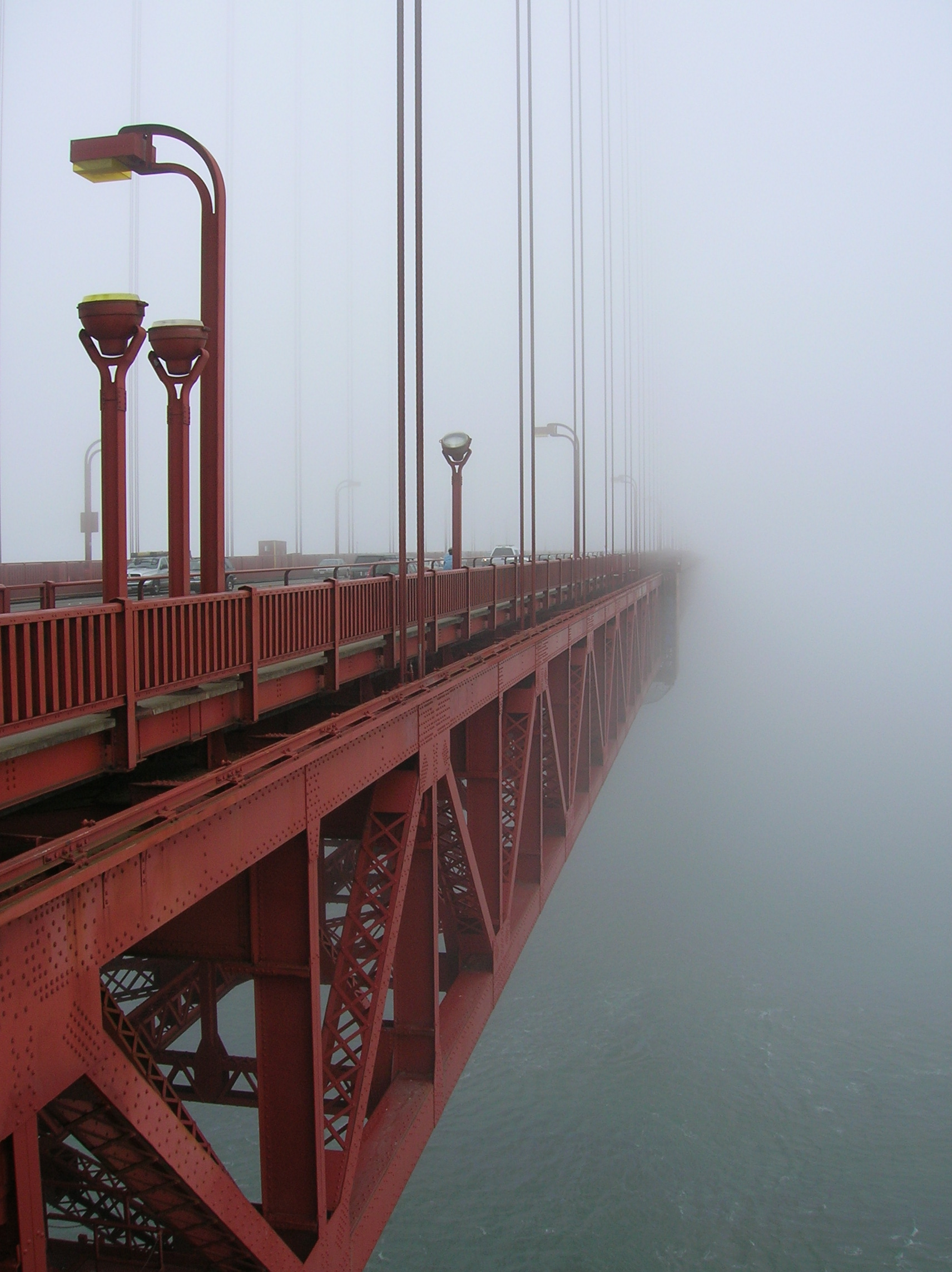
"The rail is so low, a 7-year-old can climb over it", director Eric Steel said.

The film also shows many people being saved from jumping. In one case a woman traversed the upper railing to the lower railing only to be pulled by her collar back to safety by an unrelated photographer. Filmmakers tried in each case to intercede when they could, succeeding in preventing six jumps. The crew members were trained in suicide prevention prior to filming, and had their phones programmed to call the bridge authority if they suspected someone was about to jump. "All of us came to the same conclusion that we were human beings first and filmmakers second", Steel said. However, in most cases there was either no warning or no time to prevent the jump.

The documentary also features an interview with Kevin Hines, who survived his suicide attempt at the bridge in 2000. As he fell toward the water, he decided that he wanted to live after all and positioned himself so he hit the water feet first, like a cat. He suffered serious injuries to his spine, but a sea lion helped push him up out of the water to avoid drowning. He later attributed the sea lion's presence as a sign from God.

Steel interviewed relatives and friends of the suicide victims, but did not inform them that he had footage of their loved ones' deaths. He claimed that, "All the family members now, at this point, have seen the film, [and are] glad that they had participated in it." He filmed 120 hours of interviews. Jumper Gene Sprague's life is shown throughout the film, ending with his jump into the water, shown as the last jump of the film from two opposite points. While the film crew was filming on May 11, 2004, Sprague appeared at the Golden Gate Bridge and walked back and forth over the bridge for 93 minutes. Eventually, he climbed the railing, sat for a few seconds, then stood with his back to the water and fell motionless into the water below. According to Steel, Sprague "walked across the bridge from the south to the north side and then from north to south, which are typically tourists. I did not think he would jump, but it must have been something about him that caught my attention."

== Controversies ==
The documentary caused significant controversy when bridge officials charged Steel with misleading them about his intentions. In his permit application to the Golden Gate National Recreation Area, a government agency that does not have any jurisdiction over the bridge but that does manage nearby park areas, Steel wrote he intended "to capture the powerful, spectacular intersection of monument and nature that takes place every day at the Golden Gate Bridge."

Steel says he lied on his permit application because he believed he would be instantly rejected if the true scope of his project was known. He also wanted to keep the nature of the project secret in order to prevent anyone from jumping to have their deaths recorded in the documentary: "To me, the worst-case scenario was if word got out that we were filming around the clock."

Celia Kupersmith, CEO and general manager of the Golden Gate Bridge Highway and Transportation District, said there was an increase in suicide attempts at the bridge when the documentary began appearing at film festivals and attracting publicity. District spokeswoman Mary Currie called the film an "invasion of privacy."

Kyle Gamboa, a high school student from Fair Oaks, California, skipped school in September 2013 to jump off the bridge, yelling "Yahoo!" as he leaped to his death. The New York Times reported he had watched the trailer for The Bridge repeatedly. His suicide note read, "I'm happy. I thought this was a good place to end."

In 2015, the New Zealand Film and Video Labeling Body requested Netflix to remove the documentary from its streaming service for being classified as "objectionable". Netflix complied with their request and removed the documentary from their library. New Zealand has the highest rate of youth suicides in the OECD.

== Release and reception ==
The Bridge was a box office success; from an estimated budget of $25,000, the film grossed $179,780 domestically and $25,944 overseas for a worldwide total of $205,724.

=== Critical reception ===
The film received a 68% rating from 59 reviews on Rotten Tomatoes, where the critical consensus states: "Tactlessly morbid or remarkably sensitive? Deeply disturbing or viscerally fascinating? Critics are divided on Eric Steel's unique documentary on the Golden Gate Bridge, wonder of the modern world and notorious suicide destination." On Metacritic, the film has a 58/100 rating, signifying "mixed or average reviews".

Critic Stephen Holden of The New York Times said the film "juxtaposes transcendent beauty and personal tragedy". He praised its simple documentary approach, noting it was "remarkably free of religious cant and of cozy New Age bromides", calling it "one of the most moving and brutally honest films about suicide ever made".

Josh Rosenblatt of The Austin Chronicle gave the film three out of five stars and wrote: "The results are striking: an emotional and aesthetic whirlpool of horror, fascination, beauty, and resignation that would probably drown lesser movies but that gives The Bridge an eerie power."

Other critics condemned the film for its subject matter. The Times called it "gripping viewing but you feel like a voyeur of somebody else's pain. After a while you may feel that you're watching a particularly scenic snuff film". Andrew Pulver of The Guardian gave it one out of five stars, saying it "could be the most morally loathsome film ever made".

== See also ==
- List of suicide sites
- Suicide by jumping
