= Coping planning =

Support of distressed persons

Coping planning is an approach to supporting people who are distressed. It is part of a biopsychosocial approach to mental health and well-being that comprises healthy environments, responsive parenting, belonging, healthy activities, coping, psychological resilience and treatment of illness. Coping planning normalises distress as a universal human experience. It draws on a health-focused approach to coping, to improve emotion regulation and decrease the memory of unpleasant emotions. Coping planning interventions are effective when people are supported in the process of forming coping plans.

== Approach ==
Coping planning aims to meet the needs of people who ask for help with distress, including suicidal ideation. By addressing why someone asks for help, the focus stays on what the person needs rather than on what the helper wants to do. It provides an alternative to the widely used, but non-evidence-based risk-assessment approach to suicide prevention. Needs assessment and support focuses on the individual needs of each person. They are rated as low (coping independently), moderate (may need additional low-intensity professional support), or high (needs immediate high-intensity professional support).

== Applications ==
In addition to suicide prevention training for health professionals, coping planning has been used to train journalists, and to help a range of people cope better, including carers, university students, and with children to improve emotional regulation.

=== In suicide prevention ===
Coping planning is designed to contribute to suicide prevention in a number of ways. Firstly, it provides a framework to support people whenever they seek help, rather than waiting until they are considered high-risk for death by suicide. Secondly, it aims to focus on helping people to cope, rather than to stay safe from suicide, which, according to ironic process theory, makes it more likely that people will think about suicide. Healthy coping strategies improve overall wellbeing and reduce distress. The approach is designed for use in both low (e.g., psychological first aiders or telephone helplines) and high intensity services (e.g., emergency departments or inpatient care units).

== See also ==
- Counseling psychology
