= Suicide awareness =

Effort to raise awareness of suicidal behaviors

Suicide awareness is a proactive effort to raise awareness around suicidal behaviors. It is focused on reducing social stigmas and ambiguity by bringing attention to suicide statistically and sociologically, and by encouraging positive dialogue and engagement to prevent suicide. Suicide awareness is linked to suicide prevention as both address suicide education and the dissemination of information to ultimately decrease the rate of suicide. Awareness is the first stage that can ease the need for prevention. Awareness signifies a fundamental consciousness of the threat, while prevention focuses on stopping the act. Suicide awareness is not a medical engagement but a combination of medical, social, emotional and financial counseling. Suicide awareness in adolescents focuses on the age group between 10–24 years, beginning with the onset of puberty.

== Stigma and ambiguity ==
Stigmas are negative impacts that society can often attribute to the suicidal condition and which can hinder and prevent positive engagement with those demonstrating suicidal behavior. It can be experienced as a self-stigma or cultural, public stigma. Self-stigma is the adverse effect of internalized prejudice, manifesting in reduced self-esteem, decreased self-efficacy, and a feeling of "why try" or self-deprecation.

Stigma can be experienced not only by those facing suicidal thoughts but also by those directly and indirectly affected, such as friends and family members. Public stigma is experienced by prejudice and discrimination through public misuse of stereotypes associated with suicide. Stigma can create a detrimental barrier for some seeking help. Research has consistently illustrated the physical link between suicide and mental illness. However, ignorance and outdated beliefs can sometimes lead to these disorders being mislabeled as a weakness or a lack of willpower. Stigma can prevent survivors of suicide attempts and those affected by suicide deaths from reaching out for support from professionals and advocates to make positive changes.

=== Historical stigma ===
Historically, suicide has not always been considered a societal taboo. It is critical to understand the historical context in order to raise awareness of suicide's impact on our current culture. Suicide was embraced as a philosophical escape by the followers of the Greek philosopher Epicurus when life's happiness seemed lost. It has been glorified in self-immolation as an act of martyrdom as in the case of Thích Quảng Đức who burned himself to death in protest of South Vietnam’s religious policy. Assisted suicide as a release from suffering can be traced back to ancient Roman society. In Jewish culture, there is a reverence for the mass suicide at Masada in the face of attack by the Roman Empire, showing how suicide has sometimes had a contradictory relationship with established religion. This indicates a tension between the presentation of suicide in this historical context, and its associations in our current society with personal anguish.

Today, suicide is generally perceived as an act of despair or hopelessness, or a criminal act of terrorism (suicide attack). This negative backdrop was seen in Colonial America, where suicides were considered criminal and brought to trial, even if mental illness had been present. In Roman Catholicism suicide is seen as a sinful act, with religious burial prohibited until 1983, when the Catholic Church altered the canon law to allow funerals and burials within the church of those who died by suicide. Today, many current societies and religious traditions condemn suicide, especially in Western culture. Public consideration of suicide in our culture is further complicated by society's struggle to rationalize such cult events as the Heaven's Gate mass suicide. In light of these mixed historical messages, it can be confusing for youth presented with an academic and historical profile for suicide. The ambiguity of accepted suicide and suicidal behavior definitions impedes progress with its utilization of variable terminology.

=== Public and cultural stigma ===
Today, even though suicide is considered a public health issue by advocates, the general public often still consider it a private shame; a final desperate solution for the emotionally weak. It is stigmatized in the public perception by being associated with weakness, a "cry for attention," shame, and depression, without understanding the contributing factors. There can be a visceral and emotional reaction to suicide rather than an attempt to understand it. This reaction is based on stereotypes (overgeneralizations about a group: weak or crazy), prejudices (agreement with stereotypical beliefs and related emotional reactions: Sue attempted suicide; 'I'm afraid of her'), and discrimination (unfair behavior towards the suicidal individual or group: avoidance; 'suicidal people should be locked up').

Erving Goffman defined courtesy stigma as the discrimination, prejudice and stereotypes experienced by friends and family as suicide survivors. Public stigma is felt by medical professionals whose clients die by suicide and whose treatment is then questioned by colleagues and in lawsuits, often contributing to their being less inclined to work with suicidal patients. Property can also be stigmatized by suicide: property sellers in certain jurisdictions in the United States, in California for example, are required by law to reveal if a suicide or murder occurred on the premises in the past three years, putting suicide in the same category as homicide. These issues compound and perpetuate the public stigma of suicide, exacerbating the inclination for suicidal individuals, and their family and friends, to bury their experiences, creating a barrier to care.

=== Emotional stigma ===
Emotionally, the negative stigma of suicide is a powerful force creating isolation and exclusion for those in suicidal crisis. The use of stereotypes, discrimination, and prejudices can strip the dignity of those experiencing suicidal thoughts. It also has the potential to inhibit compassion from others and to diminish hope. Fear of being socially rejected and labeled suicidal can prevent communication and support. Distress and reduced life satisfaction are directly affected by subjective feelings of being devalued and marginalized, which develops into an internalized stigma. This leads to self-stigmatized emotions, self-deprecation and self-actualization of negative stereotypes, causing further withdrawal, reduction in quality of life and inhibiting access to care.

This emotional stigma also affects suicide survivors–those suffering the loss of a loved one–stirring up guilt, self-blame, isolation, depression and post-traumatic stress. Subjective experiences of feeling shunned or blamed for an incident can cause those close to the victim to bury the truth of what transpired.

== Awareness factors ==
Suicide awareness expresses the need for open constructive dialogue as an initial step towards preventing incidents of adolescent suicide. Once the stigmas have been overcome, there is an increased possibility that education, medical care and support can provide a critical framework for those at risk. Lack of information, lack of awareness of professional services, judgment and insensitivity from religious groups, and financial strain have all been identified as barriers to support for those youth in suicidal crisis. The critical framework is a necessary component to implementing suicide awareness and suicide prevention, and breaking down these barriers.

=== Protective factors ===
Protective factors are characteristics or conditions that may have a positive effect on youth and reduce the possibility of suicide attempts. These factors have not been studied in as much depth as risk factors, so there is less research. They include:

- Receiving effective mental health care.
- Positive social connections and support with family and peers that provides coping skills.
- Participation in community and social groups (e.g. religious groups) that foster resilience.
- Optimism enables youth to engage and acquire adaptive skills in reinterpreting adverse experiences to find meaning and benefit.
- Life satisfaction, spiritual wellbeing and belief that a person can survive beyond their pain is protective against suicide.
- Resiliency based on adaptive coping skills can reduce suicide risk, and research suggests these skills can be taught.
- Finding hope can be a key protective factor and a catalyst for the recovery process.

In-depth training is paramount for those involved in any service that looks to the awareness and needs of those touched by suicide.

=== Social media ===
In the past suicide awareness and prevention have relied only on research from clinical observation. In bringing insights, intimate experience, and real-world wisdom of suicide attempt survivors to the table, professionals, educators, and other survivors can learn firsthand from their "lived experience."

Media and journalism, when reporting on suicide, have moved forward in their discussion of suicide. The Recommendations for Reporting on Suicide discovered the powerful impact that media coverage, newspapers and journalists can have on perpetuating the stigma of suicide, and that it can lead to greater risk of occurrence. The specific rules that media representatives should follow are:

- Don't sensationalize the suicide.
- Don't talk about the contents of the suicide note, if there is one.
- Don't describe the suicide method.
- Report on suicide as a public health issue.
- Don't speculate why the person might have done it.
- Don't quote or interview police or first responders about the causes of suicide.
- Describe suicide as "died by suicide" or "completed" or "killed themselves," rather than "committed suicide."
- Don’t glamorize suicide.

This is to prevent certain types of messaging around suicide that could increase the chances of at-risk youth considering or attempting suicide. This initiative brought awareness to the importance of sensitivity when reporting on suicide in a constructive, destigmatized method of messaging.

=== Social agency ===
Education in a non-threatening environment is critical to a growth in awareness among adolescents. Health education is closely related to health awareness. Pilot programs for awareness, and coping and resiliency training should be put into place for all adolescent school-aged children to combat life stressors and to encourage healthy communication.
