= Chen Si =

Chinese humanitarian and suicide preventionist (born 1968)

Chen Si (simplified Chinese: 陈思; traditional Chinese: 陳思; pinyin: Chén Sī; born 1968) is a Chinese man who has stopped at least 469 people from committing suicide off the Nanjing Yangtze River Bridge in Nanjing, China.

== Early life ==
Chen Si was born in Suqian in the province of Jiangsu. After dealing with poverty as a child, he dropped out of high school and left for Nanjing. After opening an independent fruit stand in the 1990s, he saw his fortunes improve.

== Interventions ==
He first intervened in someone's suicide attempt in 2000, and saved the woman's life. Since 19 December 2003, Chen Si has spent every weekend on the Nanjing Yangtze River Bridge, a notorious spot from which to commit suicide. Chen patrols the bridge on foot and on his motorbike, looking for people who might be contemplating suicide. To Chen, these are people "who look depressed, those whose psychological pressure is great" and whose "way of walking is very passive with no spirit, or no direction." He then approaches them and tries to talk to them; sometimes they are already over the railing, and he has to grab them and pull them back over.

In his talks with these people, Chen seeks to learn about their troubles and then find a solution. For example, Chen helped Shi Xiqing, a man who tried to commit suicide because of the $15,000 bill for his daughter's leukemia treatment, by phoning him every week and talking to his creditors.

== Media response ==
Chen and his activities have received ongoing attention from the media, both in China and abroad. Louisa Lim of NPR called him an "unlikely guardian angel." A German TV program also reported about Chen Si preventing suicides.

== Feature documentary ==
Filmmakers Jordan Horowitz and Frank Ferendo released a documentary film about Chen in 2015 called Angel of Nanjing. The documentary won over 13 awards at prestigious festivals, including seven for Best Documentary.

== See also ==
- Don Ritchie
- Kevin Briggs
- Yukio Shige
