= Jerome Motto =

American psychiatrist (1921–2015)

Jerome Motto (October 16, 1921 – January 4, 2015) was an American psychiatrist who conducted the first suicide prevention intervention that reduced deaths by suicide, as proven through a randomized controlled trial. The study involved mailing short letters that expressed the researchers' interest in the recipients without pressuring them to take any action.

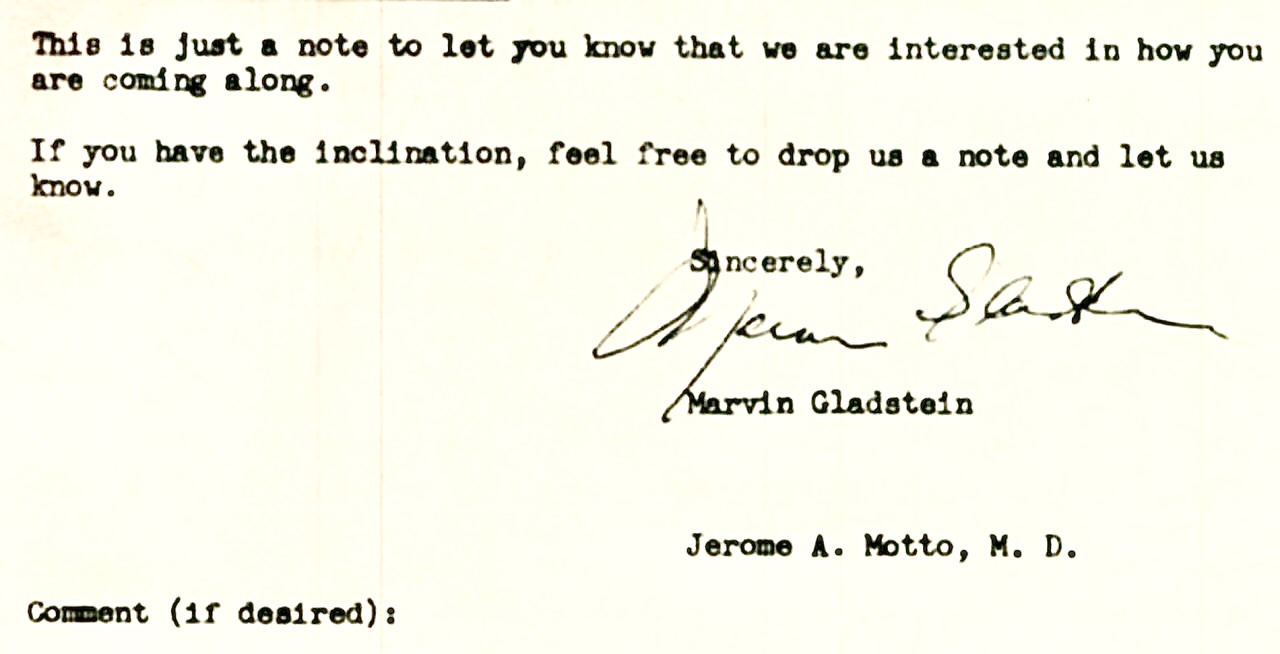
A caring letter sent by Motto to his patient

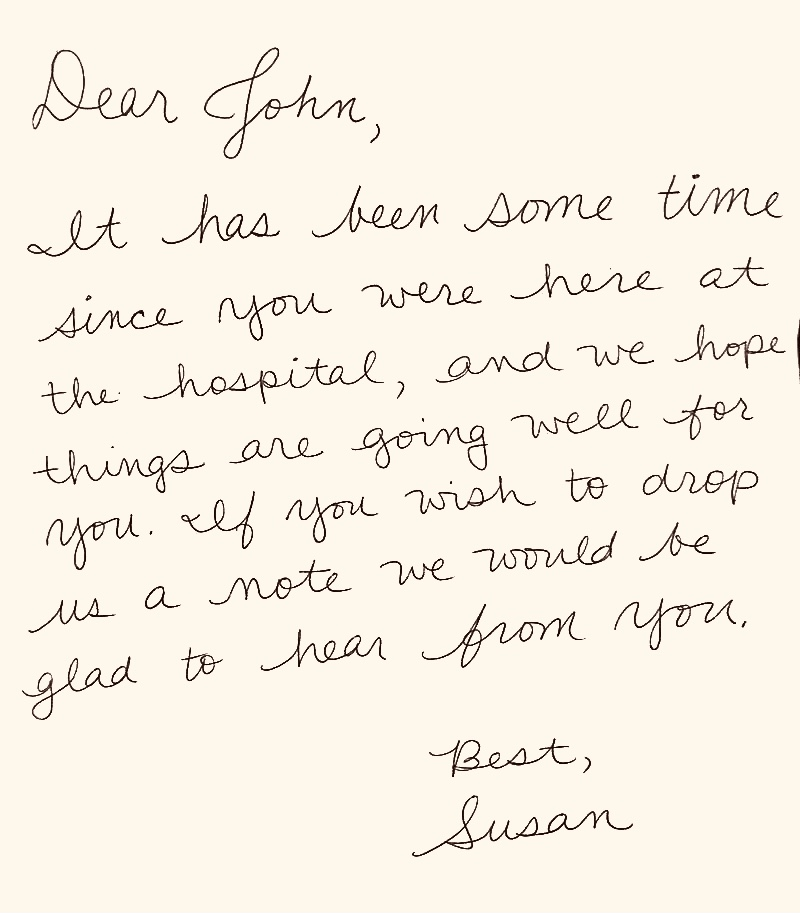
A caring letter written by hand

Motto's approach is sometimes called the "Caring Letters" model of suicide prevention. The technique involves letters sent from a researcher who had spoken at length with the recipient during a suicidal crisis. The typewritten form letters were brief – sometimes as short as two sentences – personally signed by the researcher, and expressed interest in the recipient without making any demands. They were initially sent monthly, eventually decreasing in frequency to quarterly letters; if the recipient wrote back, then an additional personal letter was mailed. The approach was partly inspired by Motto's experience of receiving letters during World War II from a young woman he had met before being deployed. Although the exact mechanisms have been debated, researchers generally think that they communicate a genuine interest and social connection that the recipients find helpful.

Caring letters are inexpensive and either the only, or one of very few, approaches to suicide prevention that has been scientifically proven to work during the first years after a suicide attempt that resulted in hospitalization.

Jerome Motto died on January 4, 2015, at Mills Peninsula Hospital in Burlingame, California.

== Publications ==
- Motto, J. A. (1976). "Suicide prevention for high-risk persons who refuse treatment". Suicide and Life-Threatening Behavior. 6 (4): 223–230. ISSN 0363-0234. PMID 1023455.
