= Eric Steel =

American filmmaker and producer

Eric Carl Steel (born 1963 or 1964) is an American filmmaker and producer, best known for his controversial 2006 documentary The Bridge.

== Career ==
=== The Bridge ===
Steel's directorial debut was the 2006 documentary The Bridge. After reading about suicides at the Golden Gate Bridge, one of the world's most often used venues for suicide, he had the bridge filmed from multiple locations throughout 2004, to obtain footage of actual suicides. In obtaining permits to film the bridge, Steel did not reveal to bridge officials that his goal was to film people committing suicide. Instead he stated that his purpose was to make a film capturing "the powerful, spectacular intersection of monument and nature that takes place every day at the Golden Gate Bridge". A number of suicides were captured on film. The resulting footage was combined with interviews with family and friends of the victims, along with other witnesses.

== Personal life ==
Steel was born in 1963 or 1964 to Bette-Ann Gwathmey, and was a stepson of Charles Gwathmey. He attended Yale University. Steel married Frank Christopher Ledda in 2015, whom he met at Whistler, British Columbia.

== Filmography ==
=== As producer ===
- Bringing Out the Dead (1999)
- Angela's Ashes (1999)
- Shaft (2000)
- Julie & Julia (2009)

=== As director ===
- The Bridge (2006)
- Kiss the Water (2013)
- Minyan (2020)
