= Kevin Hines =

American suicide prevention speaker (born 1981)

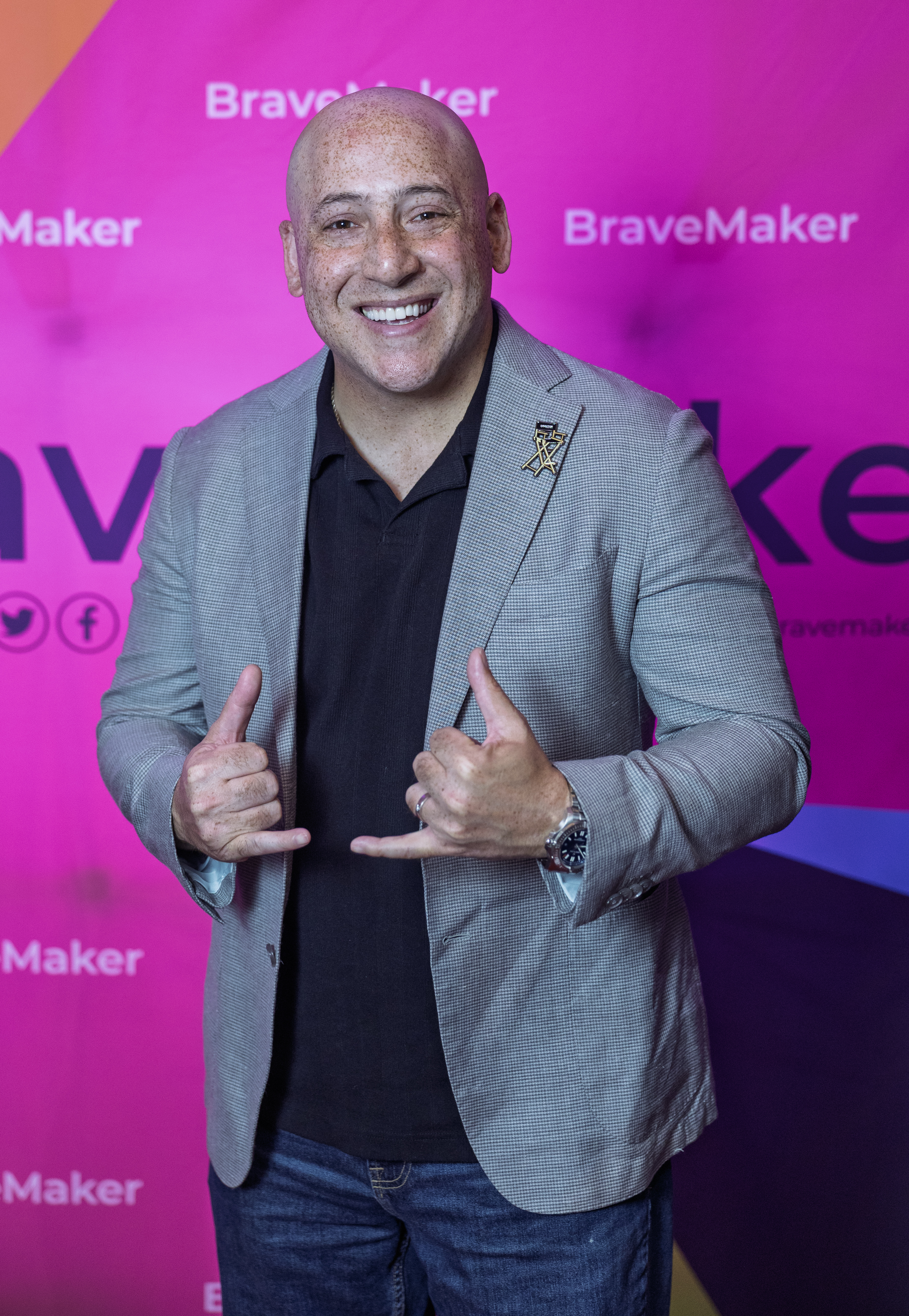
- Hines at the BraveMaker Film Festival in 2026
- Born: John Kevin Hines; August 30, 1981 (age 45); San Francisco, California, U.S.
- Occupations: Motivational speaker, advocate for suicide prevention
- Years active: 2000–present
- Known for: Surviving a suicide attempt by jumping off the Golden Gate Bridge

John Kevin Hines (born August 30, 1981) is an American suicide prevention speaker who attempted suicide by jumping from the Golden Gate Bridge in San Francisco, California, in 2000 at the age of 19. His story gained major media coverage and he has since become a motivational speaker and advocate for suicide prevention.

Hines has been featured on CNN, HuffPost, ABC News, Larry King Now, and The Today Show. He has spoken at schools, colleges, and universities to share his story. He co-founded the Kevin and Margaret Hines Foundation (KMHF), a 501(c)(3) organization based in Atlanta, Georgia, that provides funding and education for suicide prevention in the United States and elsewhere.

== Early life ==
When Hines was nine months old, he was adopted by Pat and Debbie Hines in the San Francisco area. At the age of ten, he was put on Tegretol to help control his epileptic seizures. After being taken off the drug at the age of 16, he began experiencing symptoms of bipolar disorder. Hines was also upset by the suicide of his drama teacher. In September 2000, he wrote a suicide note.

== Suicide attempt ==
On Monday, September 25, 2000, Hines traveled by bus to the Golden Gate Bridge. ABC News reported Hines began hearing voices in his head telling him to die. Hines threw himself over the rail, headfirst. After leaping, Hines instantly felt regret. He turned himself around to land in the water legs first, in an attempt to minimize injury. Two of his vertebrae were shattered, and Hines says his spine was nearly severed. Hines says that after he surfaced, a sea lion helped to keep him afloat until he was rescued by the Coast Guard.

Hines tells his story to at-risk groups around the United States and urges people to get treatment for mental illness to help them realize that suicide is not the answer. As of 2018, he was working as a mental-health advocate.

== Public and media appearances ==
Hines has been featured by CNN, HuffPost, ABC News, Larry King Now, The Today Show, BuzzFeed, PBS, 9 news Australia, The New York Post, Time, Business Insider, Newsweek, Forbes, Fox News, and other media outlets.

Hines also co-wrote and starred in the documentary Film, Suicide: The Ripple Effect, which was awarded Best Story at the Nice International Film Festival in Nice, France, in 2018.

== Activism ==
Hines's mission, through his Kevin and Margaret Hines Foundation, is to provide mental health education and suicide prevention information through worldwide public speaking engagements and research initiatives. He has a YouTube channel that focuses on mental health. He campaigned for the installation of a safety net around the Golden Gate Bridge to catch people who jump. When Hines saw the first parts of the net, he wept and said, "This is one of the most special days of my life". The net was completed in 2023 and according to the Golden Gate Bridge Highway and Transportation District has already contributed to reducing suicides.

== Awards and nominations ==
- American Foundation for Suicide Prevention Lifesaver of the Year Award
- Mental Health America: The Clifford Whittingham Beers Award
- Young Minds Advocacy: Mental Health Champion
- NoStigmas: Hero Award
- National Council Community Behavioral Healthcare: Lifetime Achievement Award
- San Francisco Police Department: Commendation Award
