= Suicide prevention =

Efforts to reduce the risk of suicide

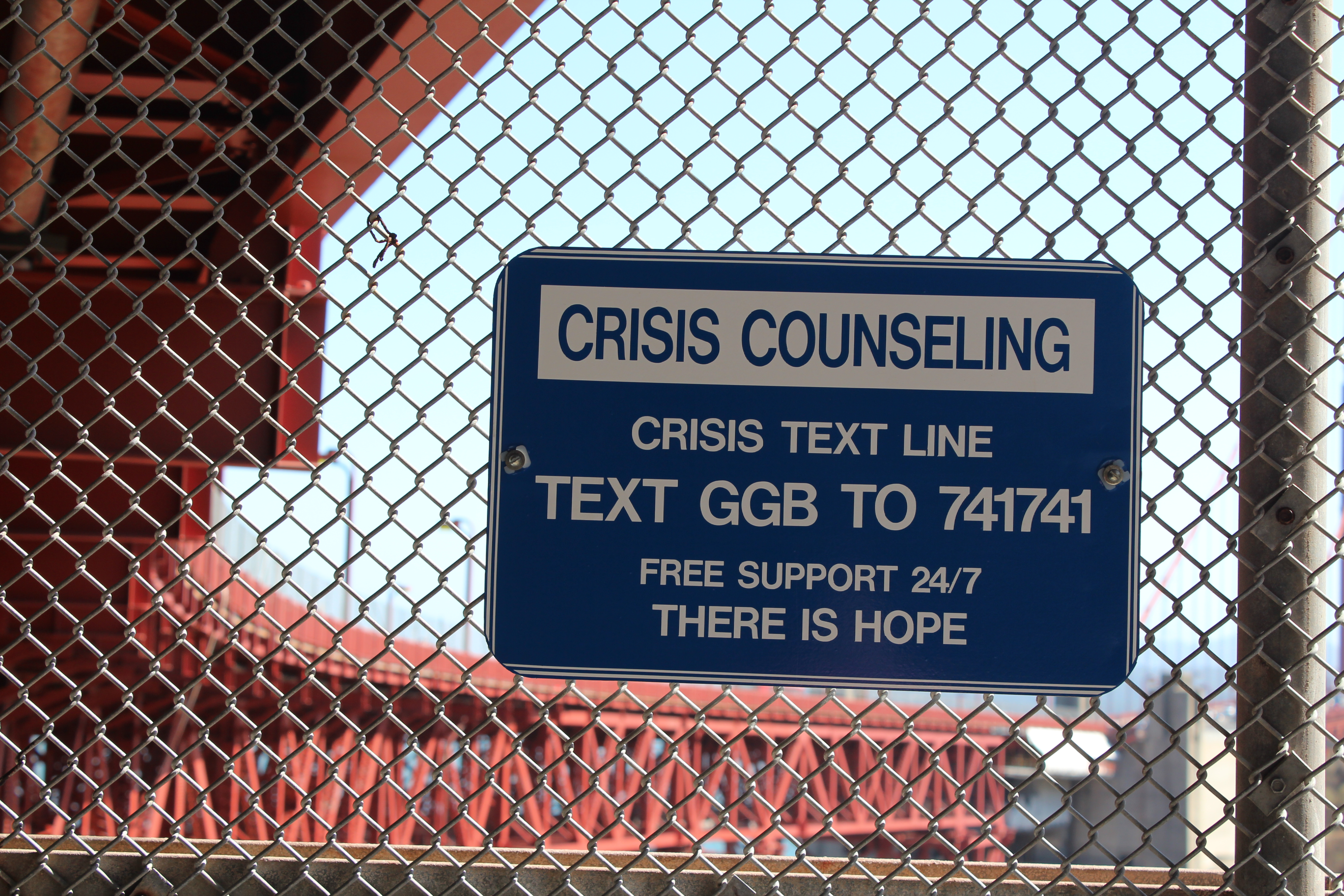
As a suicide prevention initiative, this sign on the Golden Gate Bridge promotes a special telephone that connects to a crisis hotline, as well as a 24/7 crisis text line.

Suicide prevention is a collection of efforts to reduce the risk of suicide. Suicide is often preventable, and the efforts to prevent it may occur at the individual, relationship, community, and society level. Suicide is a major public health problem that can have long-lasting effects on individuals, families, and communities. Preventing suicide requires strategies at all levels of society. This includes prevention and protective strategies for individuals, families, and communities. Suicide can be prevented by learning the indicators, promoting prevention and resilience, and committing to social change.

Beyond direct interventions to stop an impending suicide, methods may include:

- Treating mental illness
- Improving coping strategies of people who are at risk
- Reducing risk factors for suicide, such as substance misuse, poverty and social vulnerability
- Giving people hope for a more positive life after current problems are resolved
- Calling a suicide hotline

General efforts include measures within the realms of medicine, mental health, and public health. Because protective factors such as social support and social engagement — as well as environmental risk factors such as access to lethal means — play a role in suicide, suicide is not solely a medical or mental health issue.

According to the World Health Organization (WHO), suicide accounts for 1.1% of all deaths worldwide. Data collated by WHO also indicates that for every adult who died by suicide, there were an additional 20 people who made attempts.

Suicide prevention involves using a range of strategies designed to reduce the risk of suicide and support individuals in crisis. According to the National Institute of Mental Health (NIMH), key approaches include increasing access to mental health care, creating supportive environments, and raising awareness about warning signs such as withdrawal, mood changes, and talking about death or feeling hopeless. Community-based programs, crisis hotlines like the 988 Suicide & Crisis Lifeline, and school-based interventions have been shown to make a difference. Research also suggests that reducing access to lethal means can significantly lower suicide rates.

== Detection and assessment of a risk of suicide ==
=== Warning signs ===
Warning signs of suicide can allow individuals to direct people who may be considering suicide to get help.

Behaviors that may be warning signs include:

1. Talking about wanting to die or wanting to kill themselves
2. Suicidal ideation: thinking, talking, or writing about suicide, planning for suicide
3. Substance abuse
4. Feelings of purposelessness
5. Anxiety, agitation, being unable to sleep, or sleeping all the time
6. Feelings of being trapped
7. Feelings of hopelessness
8. Social withdrawal
9. Displaying extreme mood swings, suddenly changing from sad to very calm or happy
10. Recklessness or impulsiveness, taking risks that could lead to death, such as driving extremely fast
11. Mood changes, including depression
12. Feelings of uselessness
13. Settling outstanding affairs, giving away prized or valuable possessions, or making amends when they are otherwise not expected to die (as an example, this behavior would be typical in a terminal cancer patient but not a healthy young adult)
14. Strong feelings of pain, either emotional or physical
15. Considering oneself burdensome
16. Increased use of drugs, including alcohol

=== Direct talk for assessment ===
An effective way to assess suicidal thoughts is to talk with the person directly, to ask about depression, and assess suicide plans as to how and when it might be attempted. Contrary to popular misconceptions, talking with people about suicide does not plant the idea in their heads. However, such discussions and questions should be asked with care, concern and compassion. The tactic is to reduce sadness and provide assurance that other people care. The WHO advises to not say everything will be all right nor make the problem seem trivial, nor give false assurances about serious issues. The discussions should be gradual and specifically executed when the person is comfortable about discussing their feelings. ICARE (Identify the thought, Connect with it, Assess evidence for it, Restructure the thought in positive light, Express or provide room for expressing feelings from the restructured thought) is a model of approach used here.

=== Risk factors ===
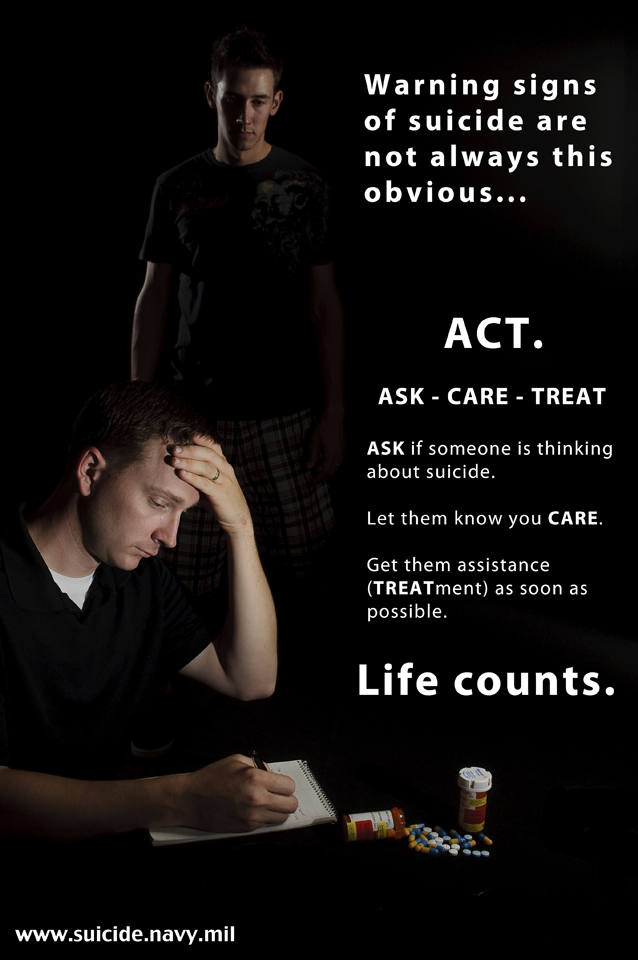
A photo illustration produced by the Defense Media Agency on suicide prevention

All people can be at risk of suicide. Risk factors that contribute to someone feeling suicidal or making a suicide attempt may include:

- Depression, other mental disorders, or substance abuse disorder
- Certain medical conditions
- Chronic pain
- A prior suicide attempt
- Childhood trauma
- Betrayal and abandonment
- Financial troubles or poverty
- Family history of a mental disorder or substance abuse
- Family history of suicide
- Family violence, including physical or sexual abuse
- Psychiatric Abuse
- Benzodiazepines
- Having guns or other firearms in the home with ammunition
- Having recently been released from prison, jail or mental asylum
- Self-harm
- Being exposed to others' suicidal behavior, such as that of family members, peers, or celebrities
- Food insecurity
- There may be an association between long-term PM2.5 exposure and depression, and a possible association between short-term PM10 exposure and suicide.
- Having a lower GPA at age 16

=== Strategies for detection and assessment ===
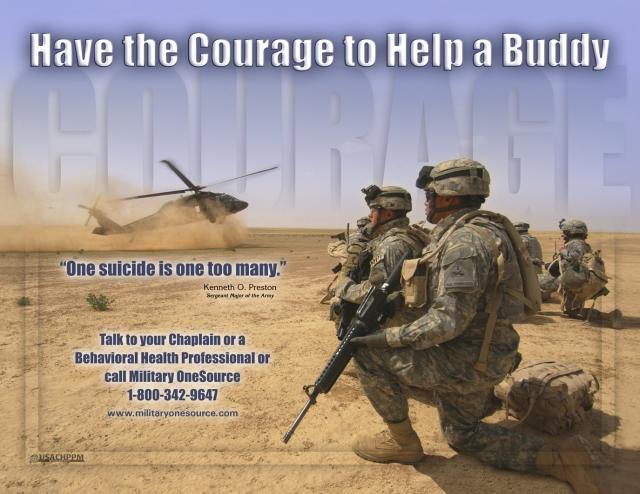
A United States Army suicide prevention poster

The traditional approach has been to identify the risk factors that increase suicide or self-harm, though meta-analysis studies suggest that suicide risk assessment might not be useful and recommend immediate hospitalization of the person with suicidal feelings as the healthy choice. In 2001, the U.S. Department of Health and Human Services, published the National Strategy for Suicide Prevention, establishing a framework for suicide prevention in the U.S. The document, and its 2012 revision, calls for a public health approach to suicide prevention, focusing on identifying patterns of suicide and suicidal ideation throughout a group or population (as opposed to exploring the history and health conditions that could lead to suicide in a single individual). The ability to recognize warning signs of suicide allows individuals who may be concerned about someone they know to direct them to help.

Suicide gesture and suicidal desire (a vague wish for death without any actual intent to kill oneself) are potentially self-injurious behaviors that a person may use to attain some other ends, like to seek help, punish others, or to receive attention. This behavior has the potential to aid an individual's capability for suicide and can be considered as a suicide warning, when the person shows intent through verbal and behavioral signs.

=== Screening ===
The U.S. Surgeon General has suggested that screening to detect those at risk of suicide may be one of the most effective means of preventing suicide in children and adolescents. There are various screening tools in the form of self-report questionnaires to help identify those at risk such as the Beck Hopelessness Scale and Is Path Warm?. A number of these self-report questionnaires have been tested and found to be effective for use among adolescents and young adults. There is however a high rate of false-positive identification and those deemed to be at risk should ideally have a follow-up clinical interview. The predictive quality of these screening questionnaires has not been conclusively validated so it is not possible to determine if those identified at risk of suicide will actually die by suicide. Asking about or screening for suicide does not create or increase the risk.

In approximately 75 percent of suicides, the individuals had seen a physician within the year before their death, including 45 to 66 percent within the prior month. Approximately 33 to 41 percent of those who died by suicide had contact with mental health services in the prior year, including 20 percent within the prior month. These studies suggest an increased need for effective screening. Many suicide risk assessment measures are not sufficiently validated, and do not include all three core suicidality attributes (i.e., suicidal affect, behavior, and cognition). A study published by the University of New South Wales has concluded that asking about suicidal thoughts cannot be used as a reliable predictor of suicide risk.

=== Underlying condition ===
The conservative estimate is that 10% of individuals with psychiatric disorders may have an undiagnosed medical condition causing their symptoms, with some estimates stating that upwards of 50% may have an undiagnosed medical condition which, if not causing, is exacerbating their psychiatric symptoms. Illegal drugs and prescribed medications may also produce psychiatric symptoms. Effective diagnosis and, if necessary, medical testing, which may include neuroimaging to diagnose and treat any such medical conditions or medication side effects, may reduce the risk of suicidal ideation as a result of psychiatric symptoms. Most often including depression, which are present in up to 90–95% of cases. The classification of a case as psychiatric frequently implies more rigid treatments.

== Methods of intervention ==
=== Restriction of lethal means ===
Though substance overdose is the most common method of attempted suicide in the U.S., guns are the most lethal (most likely to result in death).

A 2023 study concluded that more restrictive state gun policies reduced homicide and suicide gun deaths. From 1991 to 2016—when most states implemented more restrictive gun laws—gun deaths fell sharply.

Restriction of dangerous means — reducing the odds that a person attempting suicide will use highly lethal means — is an important component of suicide prevention. This practice is also called "means restriction". It has been demonstrated that restricting lethal means can help reduce suicide rates, as delaying action until the desire to die has passed. In general, strong evidence supports the effectiveness of means restriction in preventing suicides. There is also strong evidence that restricted access at so-called suicide hotspots, such as bridges and cliffs, reduces suicides, whereas other interventions such as placing signs or increasing surveillance at these sites appears less effective.

One of the most famous historical examples of means reduction is that of coal gas in the United Kingdom. Until the 1950s, the most common means of suicide in the UK was poisoning by gas inhalation. In 1958, natural gas (virtually free of carbon monoxide) was introduced, and over the next decade, comprised over 50% of gas used. As carbon monoxide in gas decreased, suicides also decreased. The decrease was driven entirely by dramatic decreases in the number of suicides by carbon monoxide poisoning. A 2020 Cochrane review on means restrictions for jumping found tentative evidence of reductions in frequency.

In the United States, firearm access is associated with increased suicide completion. About 85% of suicide attempts with a gun result in death, while most other widely used suicide attempt methods result in death less than 5% of the time. Matthew Miller, M.D., Sc.D. conducted research comparing the number of suicides in states with the highest rates of gun ownership, to the number of suicides in states with the lowest rates of gun ownership. He found that men were 3.7 times more likely to die by firearm suicide and women were 7.9 times more likely to die by firearm suicide living in states with high rates of gun ownership. There was no difference in non-firearm suicides. Although restrictions on access to firearms have reduced firearm suicide rates in other countries, such restrictions are difficult in the United States because the Second Amendment to the United States Constitution limits restrictions on weapons.

For those who decide to end their lives impulsively, a 24-hour waiting period for firearm access could substantially reduce suicide success rates. Contrary to the popular notion that suicidal people will simply find another way to kill themselves, many people who survive suicide attempts go on to lead long lives. "In 2023, more than 42,967 people died from gun related injuries. Over half of those deaths were suicides" in the United States.

=== Spiritual counseling ===
The majority of known religions consider that suicide is a sin (or an equivalent fault). Their priests are available to guide in this problem and their circumstances.

=== Psychological counseling ===
There are multiple talking therapies that reduce suicidal thoughts and behaviors.

In the group therapies, suicides can participate with other people (usually other patients with whom the patient of suicidal tendence would talk without major problems). The rest of the patients can have the same psychological problem or any other. A psychologist would direct the chat.

Psychotherapies that have been shown most successful, or evidence based, are dialectical behavior therapy (DBT), which has shown to be helpful in reducing suicide attempts and reducing hospitalizations for suicidal ideation, and cognitive behavioral therapy for suicide prevention (CBT-SP), a form of DBT that is adapted for adolescents at high risk for repeated suicide attempts, and has shown to improve problem-solving and coping abilities.

The brief intervention and contact technique developed by the World Health Organization has also shown benefit.

=== Crisis hotlines and associations that provide help ===
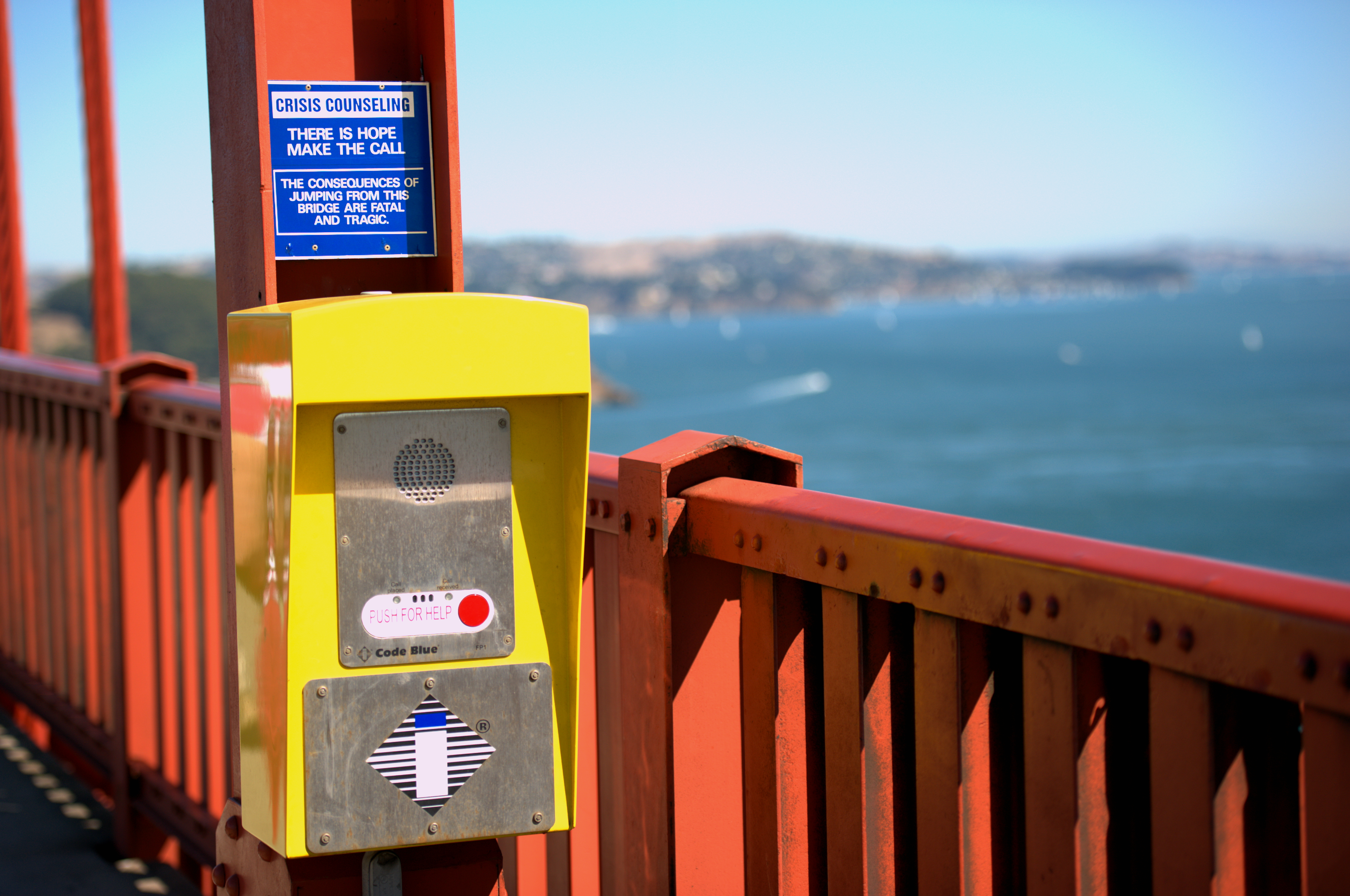
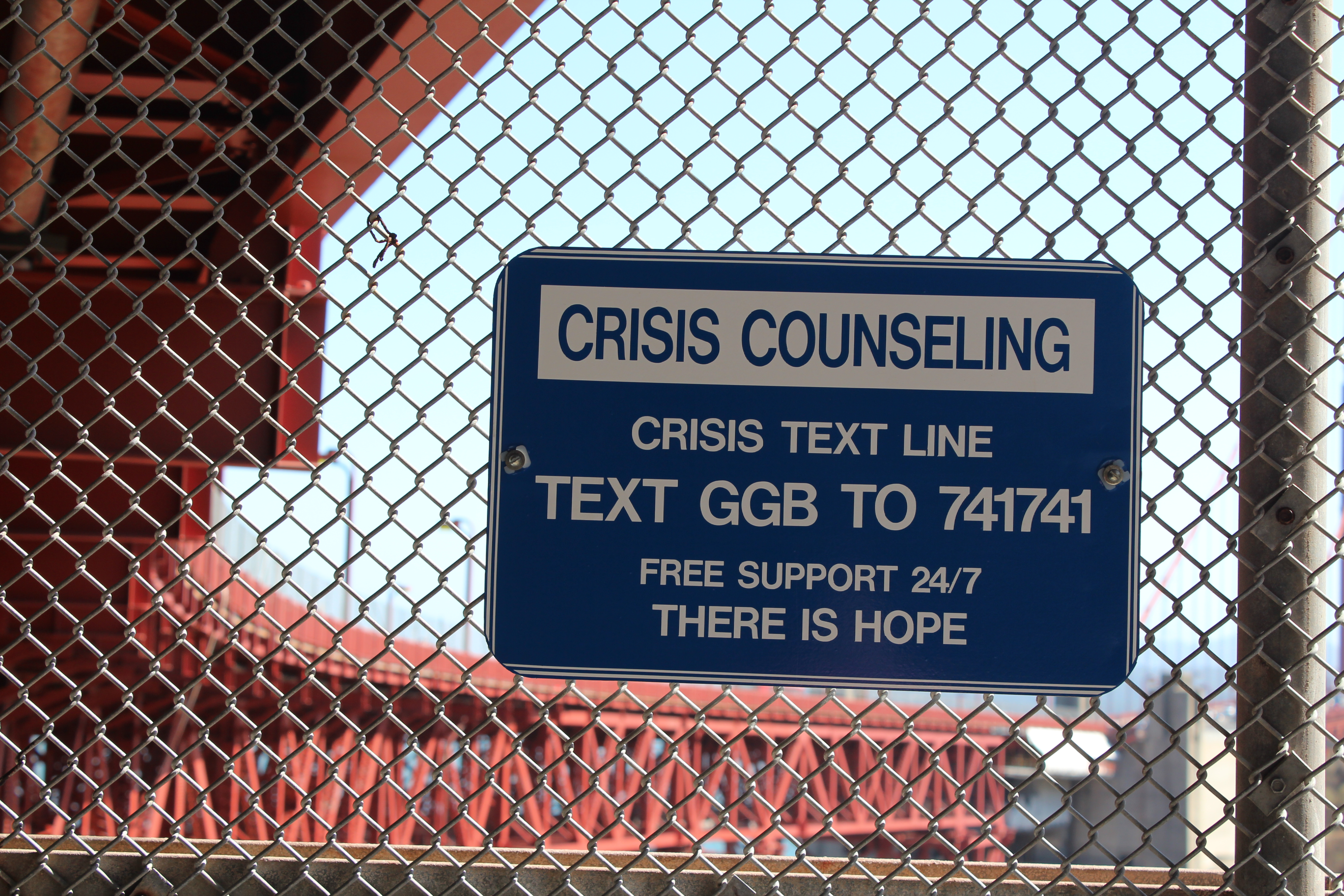
As a suicide prevention initiative, signs on the Golden Gate Bridge promote special telephones that connect to a crisis hotline, as well as a 24/7 crisis text line.

Crisis hotlines connect a person in distress to either a volunteer or staff member of an association that provides comfort and help. This may occur via telephone, online chat, or in person. Even though crisis hotlines are common, they have not been well studied. One study found a decrease in psychological pain, hopelessness, and desire to die from the beginning of the call through the next few weeks; however, the desire to die did not decrease long term.

=== Direct conversation for intervention ===
It cannot be despised that a reliable person talks directly with the person with suicidal tendences.

Some guides about conversation with suicidal patients have been distributed between people with certain probabilities to find that situation.

=== Caring letters ===
The "Caring Letters" model of suicide prevention involved mailing short letters that expressed the researchers' interest in the recipients without pressuring them to take any action. The intervention reduced deaths by suicide, as proven through a randomized controlled trial.

The technique involves letters sent from a researcher who had spoken at length with the recipient during a suicidal crisis. The typewritten form letters were brief – sometimes as short as two sentences – personally signed by the researcher, and expressed interest in the recipient without making any demands. They were initially sent monthly, eventually decreasing in frequency to quarterly letters; if the recipient wrote back, then an additional personal letter was mailed. The approach was partly inspired by Jerome Motto's experience of receiving letters during World War II from a young woman he had met before being deployed. Motto was the psychiatrist who first devised the experiment. Although the exact mechanisms have been debated, researchers generally think that the letters communicate a genuine interest and social connection that the recipients find helpful.

Caring letters are inexpensive and either the only, or one of very few, approaches to suicide prevention that has been scientifically proven to work during the first years after a suicide attempt that resulted in hospitalization.

=== Coping planning ===
Coping planning is an intervention that is based in the strengths of patient for solving the problems or at least reducing and damping their impact. It aims to meet the needs of people who ask for help, including those experiencing suicidal ideation. By addressing why someone asks for help, the risk assessment and management stays on what the person needs, and the needs assessment focuses on the individual needs of each person. The coping planning approach to suicide prevention draws on the health-focused theory of coping. Coping is normalized as a normal and universal human response to unpleasant emotions, and interventions are considered a change continuum of low intensity (e.g., self-soothing) to high intensity support (e.g. professional help). By planning for coping, it supports people who are distressed and provides a sense of belongingness and resilience in treatment of illness. The proactive coping planning approach overcomes implications of ironic process theory. The biopsychosocial strategy of training people in healthy coping improves emotional regulation and decreases memories of unpleasant emotions. A good coping planning strategically reduces the inattentional blindness for a person while developing resilience and regulation strengths.

=== Improval of the physical condition ===
According to researches, a proper diet, correct sleeping and physical exercise have a positive influence in the mood and the activity of the person.

==== In diet ====
About 50% of people who die of suicide have a mood disorder such as major depression. Sleep and diet may play a role in depression (major depressive disorder), and interventions in these areas may be an effective add-on to conventional methods.

According to Healthdirect, the national health advice service in Australia, risk of depression may be reduced with a healthy diet "high in fruits, vegetables, nuts, and legumes; moderate amounts of poultry, eggs, and dairy products; and only occasional red meat". Consuming oily fish (e.g., salmon, perch, tuna, mackerel, sardines and herring) may also help as they contain omega-3 fats. Consuming too much refined carbohydrates (e.g., snack foods) may increase the risk of depression symptoms. The mechanism on how diet improves or worsens mental health is still not fully understood. Blood glucose levels alterations, inflammation, or effects on the gut microbiome have been suggested. More information about food (e.g. oily fish with omega-3 fats, a class of PUFA), drink (e.g. water), healthy, balanced diet and mental health can be found on Healthdirect's website.

Vitamin B_{2}, B_{6} and B_{12} deficiency may cause depression in females.

Vitamin B_{12}, for humans, is the only vitamin that must be sourced from animal-derived foods or from supplements. Only some archaea and bacteria can synthesize vitamin B_{12}. Foods containing vitamin B_{12} include meat, clams, liver, fish, poultry, eggs, and dairy products. Many breakfast cereals are fortified with the vitamin.

Sources of Vitamin B_{2} (riboflavin):

- meat
- fish and fowl
- eggs
- dairy products
- green vegetables
- mushrooms
- almonds

Sources of Vitamin B_{6}
Source	B_{6} amount (mg per 100 grams, rounded values)
Pistachio	1.7
Whey protein concentrate	1.2
Beef liver, pan-fried	1.0
Tuna, skipjack, cooked	1.0
Beef steak, grilled	0.9
Salmon, Atlantic, cooked	0.9
Chicken breast, grilled	0.7
Pork chop, cooked	0.6
Turkey, ground, cooked	0.6
Banana	0.4
Mushroom, Shiitake, raw	0.3
Potato, baked, with skin	0.3
Sweet potato baked	0.3
Bell pepper, red	0.3
Peanuts	0.3
Avocado	0.25
Spinach	0.2
Ginger	0.16
Chickpeas	0.1
Tofu, firm	0.1
Corn grits	0.1
Milk, whole	0.1 (one cup)
Yogurt	0.1 (one cup)
Almonds	0.1
Bread, whole wheat/white	0.2/0.1
Rice, cooked, brown/white	0.15/0.02
Beans, baked	0.1
Beans, green	0.1
Chicken egg	0.1

=== Access of health professionals ===
Contact with health professionals is important in the fight against suicide, because it makes possible to detect suicidal intentions and attempts.

=== Medication ===
Common treatments may include antidepressants, antianxiety, antipsychotics, stimulants, mood stabilizers, and all kinds of SSRI medications. Alongside medications, a health team often includes therapy and other beneficial resources to support good outcomes for individuals and their communities.

Some antidepressant medications may increase suicidal ideation in some patients under certain conditions. Medical professionals advise supervision and communication during the usage of these medications. In case of a psychiatrist prescribes any of the medications, the problem would be taken to the field of psychiatry, with its own contexts and plannings, that are usually more rigid than those of other fields.

It is also important that, in a proportion of cases of use of drugs to prevent suicide, a "paradoxical reaction" can happen, consisting of an increase in suicidal intention, mainly on the following occasions: the beginning of the period of taking the medication, any change of dose to adjust it, and the end of its intake period (its abandonment or discontinuation). Therefore, a bigger caution is recommended at those times.

==== Lithium ====
Lithium is proven to reduce the risk of suicide in mood disorders by 87% in randomized double-blind placebo-controlled trials. Lithium has been shown to reduce the risk of suicide in people with major depression or bipolar disorder to close to the same level as that of the general population. It is thought to exert this effect by treating the underlying mood disorder and through a reduction in impulsivity and aggressiveness. In addition to its effect on suicide, lithium use lowers the risk of death from any cause in people with mood disorders. The increased presence of trace amounts of lithium in drinking water is correlated with lower overall suicide rates, especially among men.

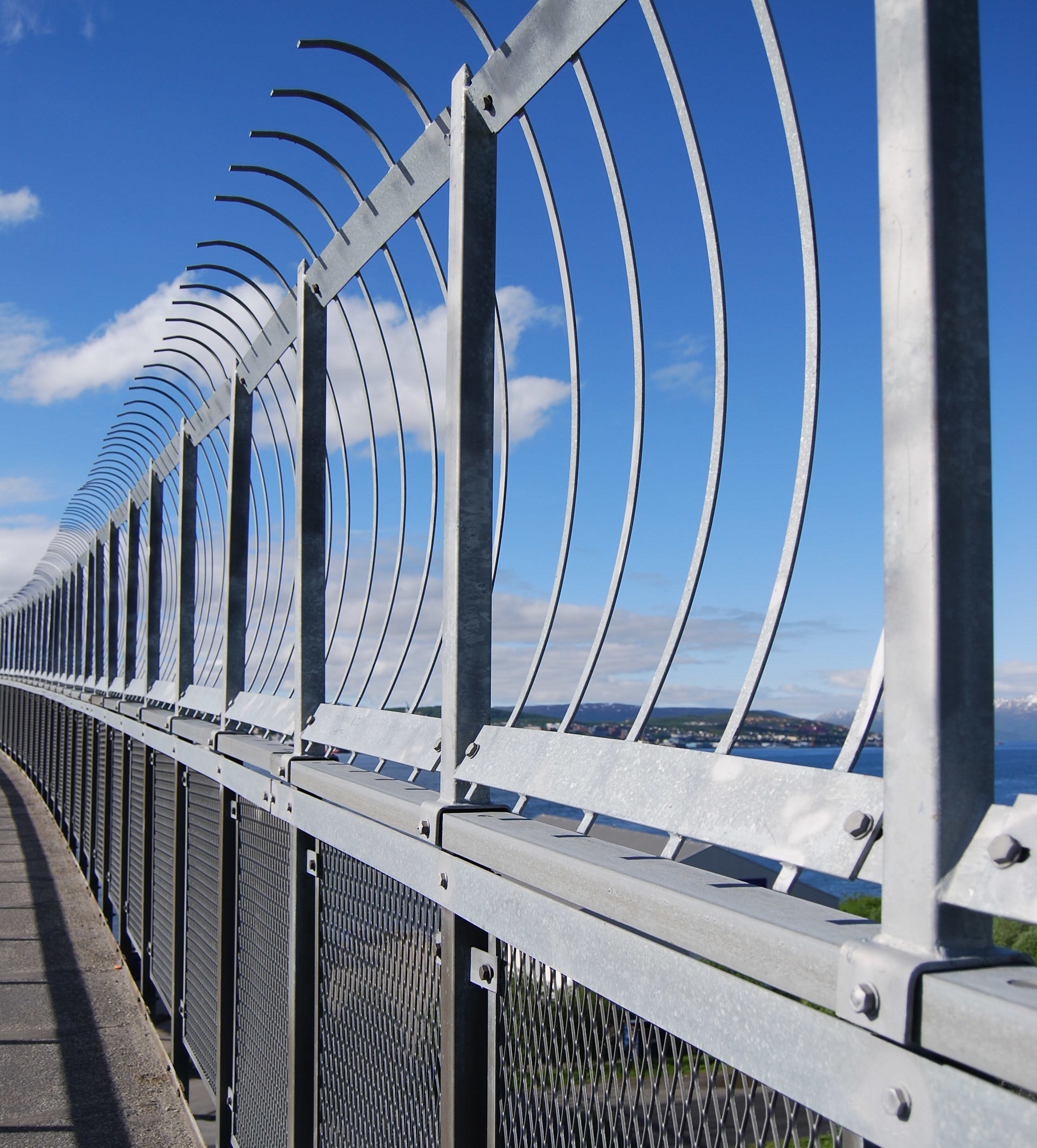
Suicide prevention fence in Tromsø Bridge

=== Barriers and physical protections ===
Physical protection systems, such as barriers and anti-suicide nets, are sometimes installed in bridges, buildings and other dangerous points, to prevent suicides in them. The decision can be influenced by the frequent use for suicide attempts of those dangerous points, and the possibility of hurting someone else in those attempts (something very feasible if jumping from skyscrapers and similar situations). Sometimes, the problem is not a possible use of those points for suicide, but a simple lack of security in them that makes people to be involuntarily exposed to the danger of accident.

=== Preventive programs to reduce the cause ===
Some plans try to avoid suicide by avoiding previous problems that could produce it. For example: violence in a relationship, in the family, school bullying, workplace mobbing, and any other. The World Health Organization recommends "specific skills should be available in the education system to prevent bullying and violence in and around the school".

=== Information campaigns ===
Prevention of suicide also implies informing to the general public, or only to a sector, about the signs of suicide, to be able to detect them, and about the existing means of help. Informative campaigns must be correctly made to work as planned. In a review of communication campaigns against suicide, only two studies of three considered that the effect of those campaigns was positive.

Whether or not mentions of suicide increase suicidal thoughts or thoughts of self harm is dependant on the context it is mentioned in and how it is presented.

=== Media guidelines ===
Recommendations around media reporting of suicide include not sensationalizing the event or attributing it to a single cause. It is also recommended that media messages include suicide prevention messages such as stories of hope and links to further resources. Particular care is recommended when the person who died is famous. Including specific details of the method or the location is not recommended.

There is little evidence, however, regarding the benefit of providing resources for those looking for help, and the evidence for media guidelines generally is mixed at best.

TV shows and news media may also be able to help prevent suicide by linking suicide with negative outcomes such as pain for the person who has attempted suicide and their survivors, conveying that the majority of people choose something other than suicide to solve their problems, avoiding mentioning suicide epidemics, and avoiding presenting authorities or sympathetic, ordinary people as spokespersons for the reasonableness of suicide.

=== General strategies for society ===
In the United States, the 2012 National Strategy for Suicide Prevention promotes various specific suicide prevention efforts including:

- Developing groups led by professionally trained individuals for broad-based support for suicide prevention.
- Promoting community-based suicide prevention programs.
- Screening and reducing at-risk behavior through psychological resilience programs that promotes optimism and connectedness.
- Education about suicide, including risk factors, warning signs, stigma related issues and the availability of help through social campaigns.
- Increasing the proficiency of health and welfare services at responding to people in need. e.g., sponsored training for helping professionals, increased access to community linkages, employing crisis counseling organizations.
- Reducing domestic violence and substance abuse through legal and empowerment means are long-term strategies.
- Reducing access to convenient means of suicide and methods of self-harm. e.g., toxic substances, poisons, handguns.
- Reducing the quantity of dosages supplied in packages of non-prescription medicines e.g., aspirin.
- School-based competency promoting and skill enhancing programs.
- Interventions and usage of ethical surveillance systems targeted at high-risk groups.
- Improving reporting and portrayals of negative behavior, suicidal behavior, mental illness and substance abuse in the entertainment and news media.
- Research on protective factors & development of effective clinical and professional practices.

==== Specific strategies in society ====
Suicide prevention strategies focus on reducing the risk factors and intervening strategically to reduce the level of risk. Risk and protective factors unique to the individual can be assessed by a qualified mental health professional.

Some of the specific strategies used to address are:

- Crisis intervention
- Structured counseling and psychotherapy
- Hospitalization for those with low adherence to collaboration for help and those who require monitoring and secondary symptom treatment
- Supportive therapy like substance abuse treatment, psychotropic medication, family psychoeducation, access to emergency phone call care with emergency rooms, suicide prevention hotlines, etc.
- Restricting access to lethality of suicide means through policies and laws
- Creating and using crisis cards, an easy-to-read uncluttered card that describes a list of activities one should follow in crisis until the positive behavior responses settles in the personality
- Person-centered life skills training, e.g., problem solving
- Registering with support groups like Alcoholics Anonymous, suicide bereavement support group, a religious group with flow rituals, etc.
- Therapeutic recreational therapy that improves mood
- Motivating self-care activities, like physical exercise, a regular sleep schedule, and meditative relaxation

=== After a suicide ===
Postvention is for people affected by an individual's suicide. This intervention facilitates grieving, guides to reduce guilt, guides to reduce anxiety and depression, and helps to decrease the effects of trauma. Bereavement is ruled out and promoted for catharsis and supporting their adaptive capacities before intervening depression and any psychiatric disorders. Postvention is also provided to minimize the risk of imitative or copycat suicides, but there is a lack of evidence based standard protocol. The general goal of the mental health practitioner is to decrease the likelihood of others identifying with the suicidal behavior of the deceased as a coping strategy in dealing with adversity.

== Legislation ==
Suicide legislation by country Suicide and assisted suicide illegal Suicide legal, assisted suicide illegal Suicide and possibly assisted suicide legal

Suicide is a crime in some parts of the world. However, while suicide has been decriminalized in many countries, the act is almost universally stigmatized and discouraged. In some contexts, suicide could be utilized as an extreme expression of liberty, as is exemplified by its usage as an expression of devout dissent towards perceived tyranny or injustice which occurred occasionally in cultures such as ancient Rome, medieval Japan, or today's Tibet Autonomous Region.

While a person who has died by suicide is beyond the reach of the law, there can still be legal consequences regarding treatment of the corpse or the fate of the person's property or family members. The associated matters of assisting a suicide and attempting suicide have also been dealt with by the laws of some jurisdictions. Some countries criminalise suicide attempts.

== Support organizations ==
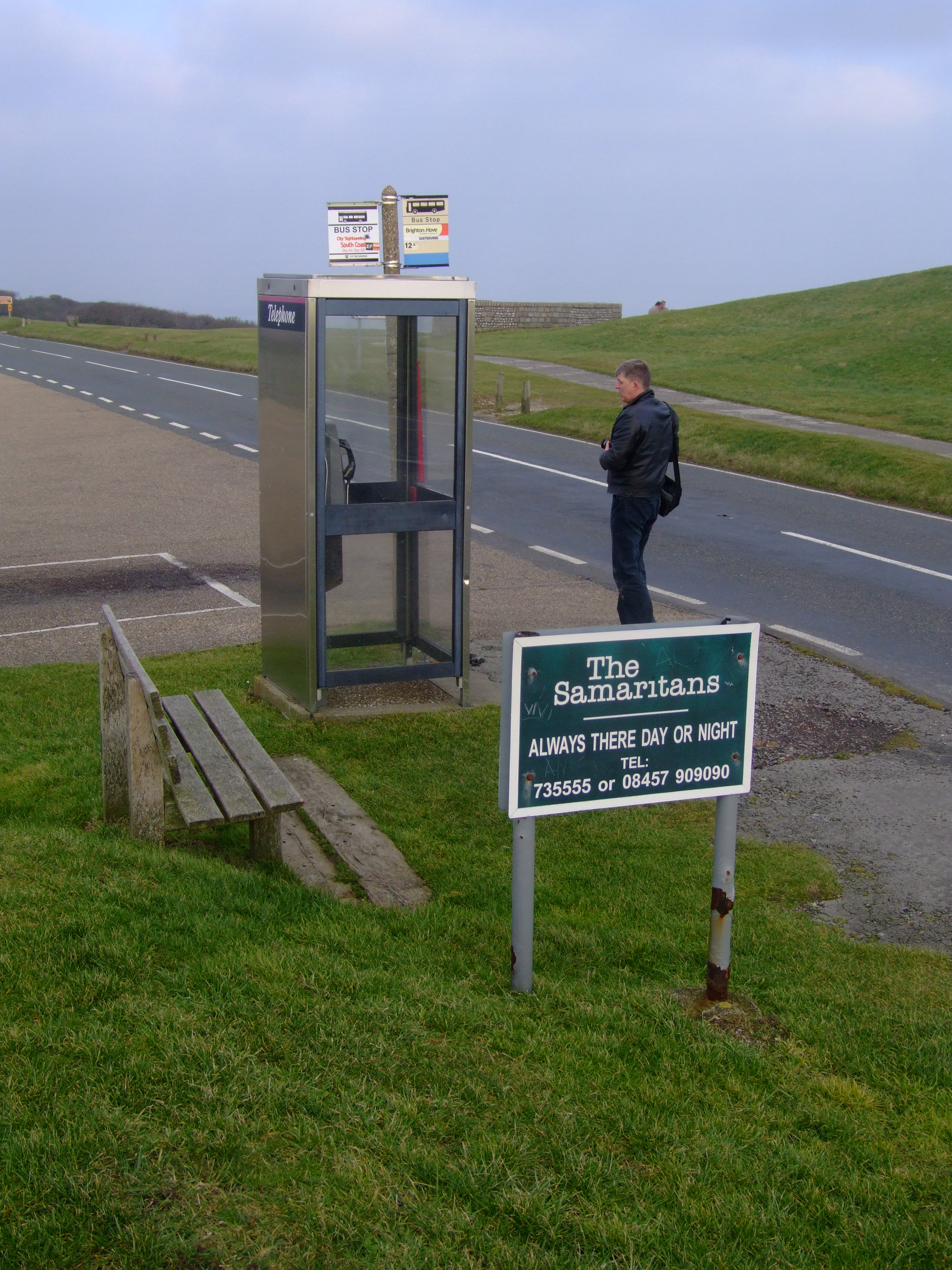
Sign promoting Samaritans near a payphone near Beachy Head, a major suicide spot in the United Kingdom

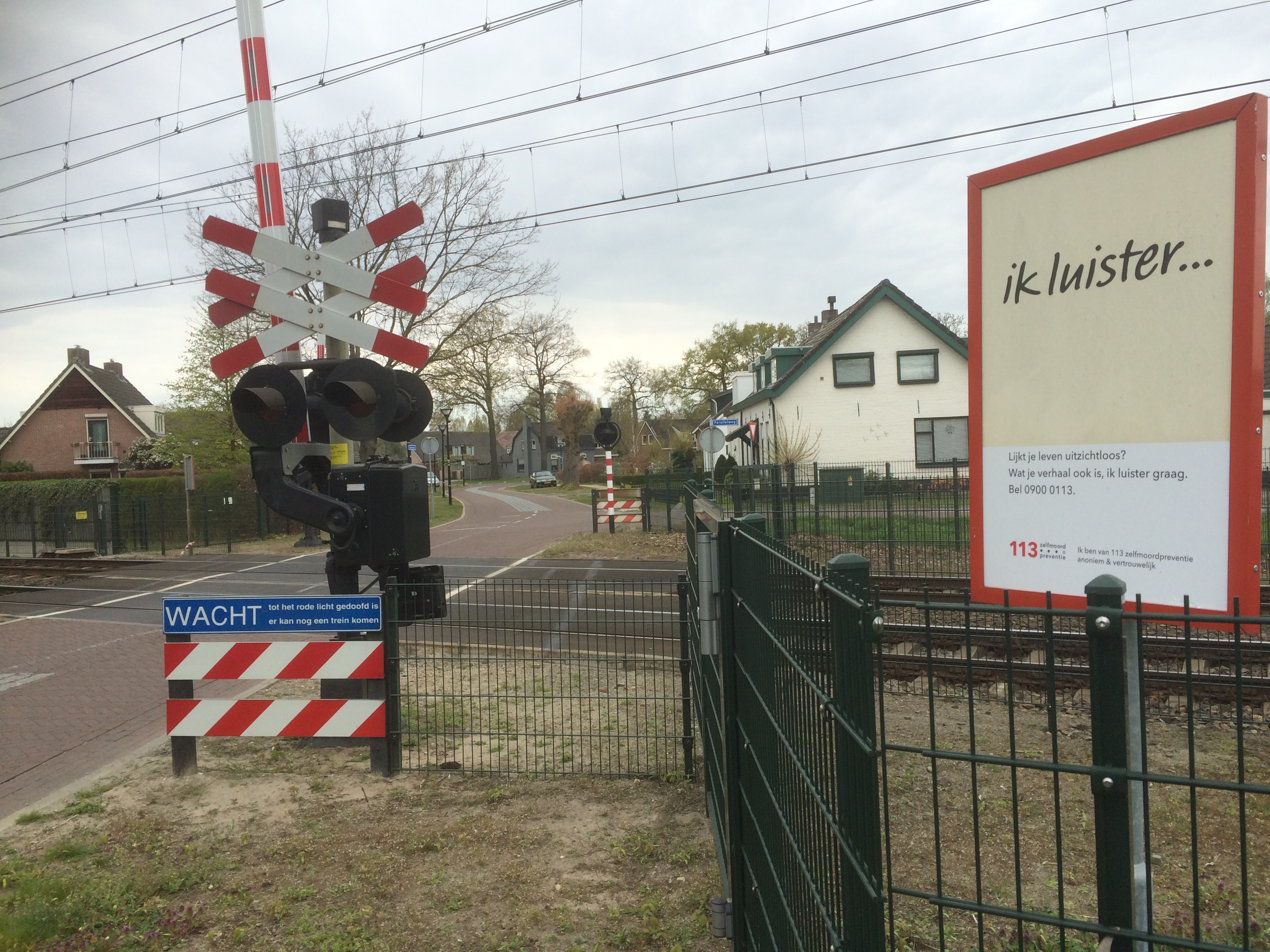
A sign at a railroad crossing in the Netherlands promoting a suicide crisis line (113)

Many non-profit organizations exist, such as the American Foundation for Suicide Prevention in the United States, which serve as crisis hotlines; it has benefited from at least one crowd-sourced campaign. The first documented program aimed at preventing suicide was initiated in 1906 in both New York, the National Save-A-Life League, and in London, the Suicide Prevention Department of the Salvation Army.

Suicide prevention interventions fall into two broad categories: prevention targeted at the level of the individual and prevention targeted at the level of the population. To identify, review, and disseminate information about best practices to address specific objectives of the National Strategy Best Practices Registry (BPR) was initiated. The Best Practices Registry of Suicide Prevention Resource Center is a registry of various suicide intervention programs maintained by the American Association of Suicide Prevention. The programs are divided, with those in Section I listing evidence-based programs: interventions which have been subjected to in depth review and for which evidence has demonstrated positive outcomes. Section III programs have been subjected to review.

=== Examples of support organizations ===
- American Foundation for Suicide Prevention
- Befrienders Worldwide
- Campaign Against Living Miserably
- Crisis Text Line
- International Association for Suicide Prevention
- The Jed Foundation
- National Suicide Prevention Lifeline
- Samaritans
- Suicide Prevention Action Network USA
- Trans Lifeline
- The Trevor Project

== Economics ==
In the United States it is estimated that a suicide results in costs of about $1.3 million. The loss of productivity from the deceased individual accounts for 97 percent of these costs. The remaining 3 percent of the costs were from medical expenses. Money spent on intervention programs is estimated to result in a decrease in economic losses that are 2.5-fold greater than the amount spent.

== See also ==
- Advocacy of suicide
- Caring letters
- Coping planning
- Crisis intervention
- Euthanasia
- List of suicide crisis lines
- Mental health first aid
- Psychological first aid
- Suicide awareness
- Suicide prevention contract
- World Suicide Prevention Day
