= Desirée Plata =

Environmental engineering professor at MIT

Desirée Plata is an American environmental engineer known for her work in the fields of sustainability and energy in both research and industrial settings. Currently an associate professor at MIT, she is also the co-founder of a methane conversion startup and Nth-Cycle, in addition to informally advising other sustainability related companies.

== Early life and education ==
As a child, while spending time at her grandmother's house in Gray, Maine, Plata noticed that in numerous neighborhood households, people were sick with neurological disorders and cancer. She later discovered that her intuition was correct: A waste disposal facility nearby had contaminated the drinking water in the area, leading to a cancer cluster. The situation affected Plata's grandmother and aunt, who was diagnosed with cancer while Plata was a PhD student at MIT. This event instilled in Plata the dedication to her work of developing ways to use science and engineering to prevent environmental and safety issues.

Desiree attended Gould Academy for high school, graduating in 1999, and then got her Bachelor of Science degree in chemistry at Union College, New York in 2003. After college, Plata enrolled in doctoral studies as a part of the joint MIT-Woods Hole Oceanographic Institution program. As a part of this program, Plata studied oil spills, co-authoring a paper that helped spur a law changing the way that oil is transported off the coast of Massachusetts. She also researched how industrial emissions created during the production of carbon nanotubes could give insights into how those materials form. This work led to a much more sustainable way to create these carbon nanotubes, which are used in many sustainability applications.

== Career ==
After getting her PhD, Plata worked as a visiting professor for MIT for two years, and then joined the faculty of Duke University and Yale University. While working at Yale, Plata co-founded a company called Nth Cycle with Megan O'Connor, a PhD student whom she worked with at Duke. The purpose of this company is to use electric currents to extract cobalt and nickel from lithium-ion batteries and other electronic waste. This method of metal extraction is much less energy intensive and safer than traditional methods, cutting energy emissions by more than 92% compared to traditional energy-intensive smelting operations. This is very much aligned with Plata's belief in considering sustainability in the design of every process. Her company was started in 2017 and began commercial operations in September 2022.

Plata eventually returned to MIT to work as an associate professor in civil and environmental engineering in 2018. Plata's research at MIT now focuses primarily on methane, and specifically exploring ways to convert methane into the less harmful greenhouse gas of carbon dioxide and other fuels in places like dairy farms and coal plants. Plata and her team at MIT recently discovered a way to use zeolite, a type of clay commonly used in cat litter, to absorb methane and turn it into carbon dioxide. The idea is that if we could take all of the methane out of the air produced from coal globally, this has the equivalent effect of taking all of the combustion engine vehicles off of the road, even after accounting for the small amount of CO_{2} that would be produced during Plata's process of methane conversion. Plata and colleagues have also employed the Ashby material selection framework to evaluate nanomaterial production methods. Plata is also the co-director of the MIT Climate and Sustainability Consortium

== Awards and honors ==
- National Academy of Sciences Kavli Frontiers of Science Fellow (2011, 2013)
- Odebrecht-Braskem Sustainable Innovation Award (2015)
- NSF CAREER Award (2016)
- Caltech Resnick Sustainability Fellow (2017)
- Department of Energy Innovation Crossroads (2018)
- MIT's Junior Bose Teaching Award (2019)
- National Academy of Engineers Frontiers of Engineering Fellow (2012, 2020)
- MIT's Harold E. Edgerton Faculty Achievement Award
