= Suicide by electrocution =

Suicide method

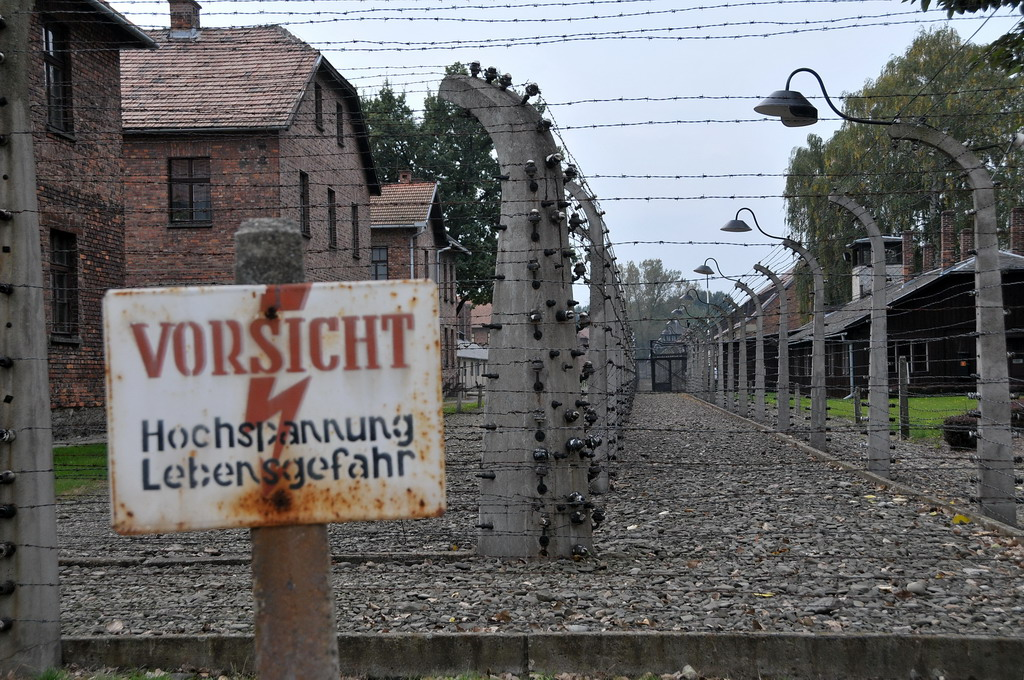
The electric fence around Auschwitz I, with warning sign from camp era, in 2009

Electrocution is an uncommon suicide method. While the victim often suffers burns and internal injuries resulting from the electricity, death results from the disruption of the heart rhythm. The earliest use is recorded in 1901, possibly inspired by the use of the electric chair in executions over the previous decade. However, in the Nazi concentration camps, it became the most frequent means of suicide due to the high-voltage electric fences surrounding the camps; one camp official even openly encouraged it.

Like other violent methods, electrocution is predominantly employed by men. A significant proportion who choose this method have experience working with electrical appliances or infrastructure and use that in their suicides, since it requires some preparation. Suicides by electrocution are evenly split between those who use high-voltage utility current and those that use lower-voltage household current. Among the latter group are the women who employ this method, almost all of whom choose to die in a bathtub in which they deliberately drop a plugged-in appliance, most often a hair dryer. It is sometimes used in conjunction with other methods, particularly on metro or subway systems where trains use third rails for power (rail suicide).

== History ==
While deaths from electrical injury have long occurred from lightning strikes, that was their only cause until the use of electricity became technologically feasible and widespread after the Industrial Revolution. The first death from electrocution was recorded in Lyon, France, in 1879. Two years later an American physician proposed the idea of using electrocution in executions, and in 1890 the electric chair went into use for that purpose in the U.S. The use of electric current as a suicide method was raised in an 1896 inventor's proposal of a coffin that would pass current through the body of someone lying in a specially designed coffin once they rested their head on a switch. The device was intended to allow the suicide to be formally buried immediately afterwards.

Suicides by electrocution are reported as early as 1901, when a man in the Italian city of Turin climbed a ladder and grabbed two conduits in either hand, killing him instantly as he fell with "bluish flames" from his hands. The British newspaper that reported this event described it as "a new departure in suicide". The following year, in the U.S., an Omaha, Nebraska, electrician was reported as having taken his own life by electrocuting himself. It was reported that he entered the power plant where he worked early one morning, removed the insulation from two thousand-volt wires, and then touched them both with wires he held in his hands.

In 1907 a coroner's jury convened in Kingston upon Thames heard what was reported by one British newspaper as the first case of suicide by electrocution on record. The victim, William Brown, visiting a power plant where he occasionally did carpentry work, asked the foreman to show him the most dangerous parts of the electrical equipment. These turned out to be the terminals of a switch on one of the alternators, which Brown was told would send 2,000 volts through the body of anyone touching both of them while the circuit was active. Brown asked if that would result in a near instantaneous death; the foreman assured him that it would. A few minutes later, the foreman's work was interrupted by shouts from the vicinity of the switch. Seeing Brown resting his head against the switch as well as clutching the two terminals, he switched off the current but Brown was already dead. A note confirming his suicidal intent was found on the body.

The use of electricity in a suicide is reported in a 1926 issue of Science and Invention, edited by Hugo Gernsback. An electrician and his girlfriend in Trieste, Italy, went into a local powerhouse and wrapped a cable around themselves, after which the electrician attached a stone to one end and threw it over a live cable to bring it in contact with the current. A citywide blackout ensued, leading to the discovery of the bodies in the powerhouse. It was described as the first suicide by electrocution in Italy. Four years later an Austrian butcher sought for a killing took his own life the same way when he was unable to further elude police.

=== In Nazi concentration camps ===
In the early 1940s, the Nazi Germany regime began placing political prisoners from countries conquered early in World War II into concentration camps. Inhumane living conditions and harsh, often capricious, discipline made death frequent among the imprisoned. (Note: "Prisoners died in such great numbers that death was regarded as a tragic norm of camp life." wrote Stanisław Kłodziński, a survivor researching suicide in the camps, in 1976. "Death surprised nobody, since it happened every day ... In a situation when death appeared to be a question only of time, many prisoners shortened the period of awaiting their sentence and execution by committing suicide.") Later camps such as Auschwitz had gas chambers added to exterminate many, primarily Jews, that the Nazis found undesirable and unfit for labour. Other camps, like Treblinka, were devoted solely to that purpose. Many prisoners, seeing minimal prospect for survival, turned to suicide to have some control over their fate. A later history that reviewed accounts by survivors in addition to camp medical records kept at Auschwitz by the Nazis suggests the true number of suicides in the camps was far higher than previously believed. It is difficult to determine exact numbers since many killings and suicides were often reported as the other manner of death.

Since knives and other sharp objects were confiscated upon intake to the camps for security reasons, prisoners seeking to take their own lives found other methods. The most common was to deliberately touch the 5,000-volt electrified fence around the camp perimeter, referred to as "flinging oneself into the wires" (Polish: rzucenie się na druty). This usually caused instant death and led the body to burn. Most commonly those suicides chose dawn or dusk; some took place during the camp's daily assembly where thousands of prisoners and staff could see. Suicides were observed to either run directly at the fence or walk slowly, "as if with ostentation and ecstasy." (Note: These suicides were among those most frequently reported by guards as prisoners shot while attempting to escape, a major factor in the unreliability of official counts.)

Bodies of prisoners on the electric fence at the Mauthausen camp in Austria

The bodies of completed suicides were often left in place. One Auschwitz survivor described the fences as "covered with bodies ... they would burn as it was described that there was never a time in the camp when there weren't a dozen people who had gone out and committed suicide on these fences and their bodies were burnt brown and crisp and the smell was throughout the camp."

Eight instances of mass or group suicide were recorded in the camps, many using electrocution. In the earliest, a group of Soviet prisoners of war, after being denied food following evening roll call, ran en masse into the nearby fence. Survivors of Birkenau, the women's camp at the Auschwitz complex, recalled one case of a Slovak woman who, no longer able to protect her teenage daughters, donned Soviet POW uniforms along with them one night in October 1942 and walked towards the fence. She told a guard that she could no longer abide her daughters' suffering. The older one went willingly into the fence; after pushing the younger daughter to her death the woman knelt in front and clasped the wire.

The Nazis themselves were aware of suicide by this method from the early days of the camps, and did not discourage it. Upon the arrival of the first large group of prisoners at Auschwitz in June 1940, deputy commandant Karl Fritzsch addressed the 728 prisoners, mostly Polish resistance fighters and intellectuals swept up in the AB-Aktion, disillusioning them about their chances for long-term survival at the camp. "The only way out is through the chimney," he advised them. "If someone doesn't like it, they can go straight to the wires."

== Low rate ==
Many writers on the subject have said that electrocution is rarely used as a suicide method, and several studies have supported this. The longest, a review of 41 years of autopsies from eight districts in Bulgaria, which during that time had the highest overall rate of death from electrical injury in Europe, found only 59 electrocution suicides out of over 60,000 autopsies performed. A later review of data from a different period in a smaller portion of the country put the annual rate of suicide by electrocution at 0.09 per 100,000 people. The medical examiner's office in Wayne County, Michigan, found that over 5,000 suicides it investigated during a 20-year period, only three involved electrocution; a 1980 Florida study of 220 electrocution deaths found only two suicides. Between 1996 and 2005, only 25 suicides in Sydney, Australia's largest city, were due to electrocution. A study of electrocution deaths in the state of South Australia over a 30-year period found that 28 of 96 were suicides. Another study of electrocution deaths in Northern Ireland over 22 years found that the nine such suicides over that period made their annual statistical rate 0.025 per 100,000 people.

Suicide similarly accounts for a small portion of deaths from electrocution. The study in Northern Ireland contrasted the nine suicides with 50 accidental electrocutions, making them 15% of the total. The 41-year Bulgarian study put suicides at 6% of all electrical fatalities; the later Bulgarian review concurred, finding a 7% rate.

Given the easy access to electricity at potential lethal voltages in almost every house in the developed world since the late 20th century, and the high likelihood of completing a suicide with it, one commentator has wondered why the rate of suicide by electrocution is so much lower than hanging, which is also likely and believed to be highly amenable to completion. James Lucas, author of the Northern Ireland study, speculates that perhaps many people have a past experience with being shocked that was too painful to replicate even for suicidal purposes. He also notes the association with the electric chair and electrocution as a means of execution. Rates of suicide by electrocution in the U.S., where that is still used in some states to carry out death sentences, are lower than those in other countries where it has never been used, he points out. "The situation is somewhat analogous to the increase in suicidal hangings in Britain since the abolition of capital punishment." An Australian writer later speculated that countries with higher rates of electrocution suicide may be experiencing a substitution effect of limited access to firearms.

== Demographics ==
The studies that looked at suicides by electrocution over time have all found most were men, consistent with electrical injury and death generally. Women have accounted for 10–20% of the total. (Note: In 2015, an Indian married couple electrocuted themselves together.) In the early and mid-20th century it was often assumed that most male suicides electrocuting themselves were electricians, electrical engineers or had some other professional experience working with electrical infrastructure. The Sydney study found 35% of suicides worked as electricians. Later analysis showed an occupational connection in 20% of all cases; most of the remainder, however, had some informal interest in electrical work.

The Northern Ireland study also considered the psychological state of the nine suicides. In common with most suicides, all but one had a history of depression, though none had any comorbid psychoses. Two victims had previously attempted suicide, by other methods. Five had measurable blood alcohol content, suggesting they had been drinking prior to taking their lives, also frequent in male suicides, though in three it was low enough (less than 80 mg/100 ml) that it might have been a result of the decomposition process in the interval between the suicide and the autopsy.

The Bulgarian study found the mean age of its victims to be 45±6 years. They ranged in age from 14 to 75.

=== Timing ===
Accidental deaths from electrocution tend to peak in the summer, when recreational and occupational exposure to electricity peaks, people wear less clothing and increased humidity makes skin more conductive. Researchers have reached different conclusions as to whether suicides by that method follow any discernible temporal pattern. The South Australian study found its suicides evenly distributed throughout the year. However, the Bulgarian researchers found a peak in September after an increase over the summer, with the middle days of the week likewise showing a peak.

== Methods ==
Researchers have found a slight preference for the use of lower-voltage mains electricity, usually found in residential and business customers, over higher-voltage utility current used in transmission and infrastructure. This is consistent with most such suicides taking place at home, as did all nine suicides in the Northern Ireland study. Likewise, in Sydney, all 25 used household power. The Bulgarian study found a roughly even division between the two, but a less comprehensive study by the same researchers found that 43% of electrocution suicides used household current while 34% used high voltages.

Those who use high-voltage current most frequently make direct contact with an uninsulated cable, sometimes climbing a pole or pylon to do so. Suicides using household current often strip the insulation and wrap the exposed wires around their wrists in a manner reminiscent of executions using electrocution; some even use small metallic items taped to the chests to further enhance conductivity and stop the heart. A teenaged Malaysian boy even sat on a chair as he electrocuted himself, further replicating the electric chair.

Some low-voltage suicides build their own devices. A former electrician in Turkey wrapped bare wires around various body parts that were connected to an extension cord with a switch in between. In a case in Sri Lanka, a medical professional used defibrillator pads.

=== Use of bathtub ===
Women use electrocution to take their own lives at a much lower rate than men. But historically many women who have chosen this method preferred to immerse themselves in a bathtub and then drop a plugged-in appliance, usually a hair dryer, in it. (Note: In India bathtub suicides are uncommon since only very affluent households have bathtubs.) Electrocution fatalities in bathtubs have been greatly reduced by the use of residual-current devices in the U.S.

=== In conjunction with other methods ===
Electrocution is not often used for complex suicides, in which more than one method is employed. In one reported instance a man, after having slit his wrists, apparently became impatient with the progress he was making and decided to touch a live wire in his bathroom. After that failed, he drowned himself in a water drum. This combination of methods appeared unique. Two cases were reported in Hungary of suicides who hanged themselves from high-voltage transmission towers. In both cases electrocution was the cause of death; blunt force trauma from the hanging was a contributing cause in one.

While possibly unintended in most circumstances, electrocution plays a role in suicides on urban mass transit rail systems, commonly referred to as subway or metro suicides. Most such systems are powered by electricity, with trains drawing current from a necessarily uninsulated third rail carrying 600–750 volts, easily accessible to anyone willing to enter the track area. Suicides by intentional direct contact with the third rail without a moving train present are rare One 1974 study of attempted suicides found that those who chose electrocution alone in subway or metro settings were less likely than those that placed themselves in the train's path to have been exposed to violence and chosen violent methods of suicide for previous attempts.

A study of autopsies of suicides on India's Kolkata Metro found many showing signs of electrical injury as well as the severe blunt-force injuries resulting from contact with the train. In some cases the train had been able to stop before striking the victim, leaving them to die purely as a result of the current. An operator on the Toronto subway recalled seeing a suicide her train struck lying on the tracks in the station while holding the third rail.

Third rails are not the only electrical aspect of rail infrastructure to be used by suicides. In 2024 the charred body of an Indian man was recovered from the roof of a locomotive pulling into Jhansi station in Uttar Pradesh after he jumped off a nearby shed onto the train. On the way down he struck the high-voltage overhead line from which the train drew power, electrocuting himself.

== Forensics ==
Before any investigation begins into a possible suicide by electrocution, responders should check to make sure the victim's body is no longer electrically active. Some rescuers and others who have found bodies have suffered further injury when making contact. Some suicides have shown foresight in this regard, arranging circuits to break when a door to the room in question is opened, or using timers. In some cases the current and the manipulation required of the circuitry required to divert it has also caused fuses to blow.

In most electrocution situations, it is clear when the death was a suicide, though, it may be necessary to have an electrical professional inspect the wiring and circuits. This is done to eliminate any possibility the death was either accidental or one of the extremely rare instances of a homicide by electrocution, since those perpetrating such killings often attempt to make them look like suicides. Suicide notes may be found nearby as well. With bathtub electrocutions, it may be more difficult to distinguish an accident from a suicide at first due to the higher occurrence of the former.

In electrocution, regardless of the manner of death, the cause is usually the cardiac arrhythmia effected by the current. Alternating current is more likely to be fatal since it travels in both directions along the circuit, generally has a much higher amperage and often induces a contraction in the muscle in contact with the current, making it harder to disconnect if a hand is touching the circuit. Direct current, by contrast, usually results in a tetanoid spasm that releases contact.

== Notable suicides ==
- Willibald Borowietz, German general who, while being held at a U.S. POW camp in 1945, stuck his finger in a light socket while standing in a bathtub. At the time his death was reported publicly as a brain hemorrhage; Army records described it as electrocution.
- Paul Clayton, American folk singer who dropped an electric heater into his bathtub in 1967.
- Christopher John Lewis, New Zealander who in 1997 electrocuted himself in prison with wires connected to a nearby junction box while facing murder charges, a suicide confirmed years after his death when it also was revealed that in 1981 he had attempted to assassinate Queen Elizabeth II on a royal visit.

== See also ==
- Suicide prevention – Efforts to reduce the risk of suicide
