= Christopher John Lewis =

New Zealander who attempted to assassinate Queen Elizabeth II

- Born: 7 September 1964; Dunedin, New Zealand
- Died: 23 September 1997 (aged 33); Mount Eden Prison, Auckland, New Zealand
- Cause of death: Suicide by electrocution
- Known for: Attempted assassination of Queen Elizabeth II

Christopher John Lewis (7 September 1964 – 23 September 1997) was a New Zealand criminal who made an unsuccessful attempt to assassinate Queen Elizabeth II in 1981. He planned future attempts at assassinating other British royal family members but was kept away from them by the authorities in New Zealand.

In 1997, Lewis was charged with the murder of Tania Furlan and the kidnapping of her daughter. He killed himself in custody before he could be brought to trial.

== Early life ==
Lewis was born in Dunedin on 7 September 1964. He had a troubled life; his father was a cruel disciplinarian, and he was expelled from school after assaulting another child. He struggled at school and was unable to write or read until the age of eight. As a boy, he idolised Charles Manson. In his teens, he formed a would-be guerrilla army (the National Imperial Gurelia [sic] Army) with two friends. The group stole weapons, sent a threatening letter to the police, and robbed a post office of NZ$5,244.

== Assassination attempts ==
On 14 October 1981, 17-year-old Lewis had been tracking the New Zealand tour of the royal family, who were to visit Otago Museum in Dunedin. Lewis concealed a BSA .22 (5.6 mm) calibre bolt-action rifle wrapped up in an old pair of jeans, and travelled by bicycle to the Adams Building, where he took up a position in a toilet cubicle. He fired through the window at the Queen as she was exiting a car. The shot did not impact near the Queen or anyone else, but a loud crack was heard; local police told journalists that the noise had been caused by a sign falling down.

While Lewis did not have a proper vantage point nor a sufficiently powerful rifle for his purposes, a 1997 report by the New Zealand Security Intelligence Service notes that his intent was to kill the Queen. Eight days after firing the shot, Lewis was arrested and charged with public possession of a firearm, and public discharging of a firearm. As the charges were read to him, Lewis responded, "Only two charges, what? Shit ... Had the bullet hit her, would it be treason?" Lewis served three years in prison, with the last part in a psychiatric prison.

The New Zealand Police covered up the story, charging him with possession of a firearm, as they were concerned that it would create a negative image of New Zealand and endanger future royal visits. According to police files, Lewis was being asked about an unrelated robbery when he took police to the location where he had fired at the Queen and showed police the empty casings and the rifle. The facts of the attempt were classified until released in February 2018 in response to a request from Fairfax Media.

Lewis unsuccessfully attempted to escape from a psychiatric ward in 1983 when the Prince and Princess of Wales, Charles and Diana, toured New Zealand with their son William.

== Later life ==
Lewis was eventually released, and when the royal family visited in 1995 the government sent him to Great Barrier Island on a "taxpayer-funded vacation" to keep him away from them. He was later charged with the 1997 murder of a young mother, Tania Furlan, who was bludgeoned to death with a hammer, and the kidnapping of her child. He electrocuted himself in Mount Eden Prison, Auckland, while awaiting trial. A friend of Lewis, Travis Burns, later received a reward for implicating him in Furlan's murder.

== See also ==
- Marcus Sarjeant, man who fired six blank rounds at the Queen in June 1981
- David Kang, man who fired two blanks at Prince Charles in 1994
