= Cancer cluster =

Type of disease cluster

A cancer cluster is a disease cluster in which a high number of cancer cases occurs in a group of people in a particular geographic area over a limited period of time.

Historical examples of work-related cancer clusters are well documented in the medical literature. Notable examples include: scrotal cancer among chimney sweeps in 18th-century London; osteosarcoma among female watch dial painters in the 20th century; skin cancer in farmers; bladder cancer in dye workers exposed to aniline compounds; and leukemia and lymphoma in chemical workers exposed to benzene.

Cancer cluster suspicions usually arise when members of the general public report that their family members, friends, neighbors, or coworkers have been diagnosed with the same or related cancers. State or local health departments will investigate the possibility of a cancer cluster when a claim is filed. In order to justify investigating such claims, health departments conduct a preliminary review. Data will be collected and verified regarding: the types of cancer reported, numbers of cases, geographic area of the cases, and the patients clinical history. At this point, a committee of medical professionals will examine the data and determine whether or not an investigation (often lengthy and expensive) is justified.

In the U.S., state and local health departments respond to more than 1,000 inquiries about suspected cancer clusters each year. It is possible that a suspected cancer cluster may be due to chance alone; however, only clusters that have a disease rate that is statistically significantly greater than the disease rate of the general population are investigated. Given the number of inquiries it is likely that many of these are due to chance alone. It is a well-known problem in interpreting data that random cases of cancer can appear to form clumps that are misinterpreted as a cluster.

A cluster is less likely to be coincidental if the case consists of one type of cancer, a rare type of cancer, or a type of cancer that is not usually found in a certain age group. Between 5% and 15% of suspected cancer clusters are statistically significant.

== Examples ==
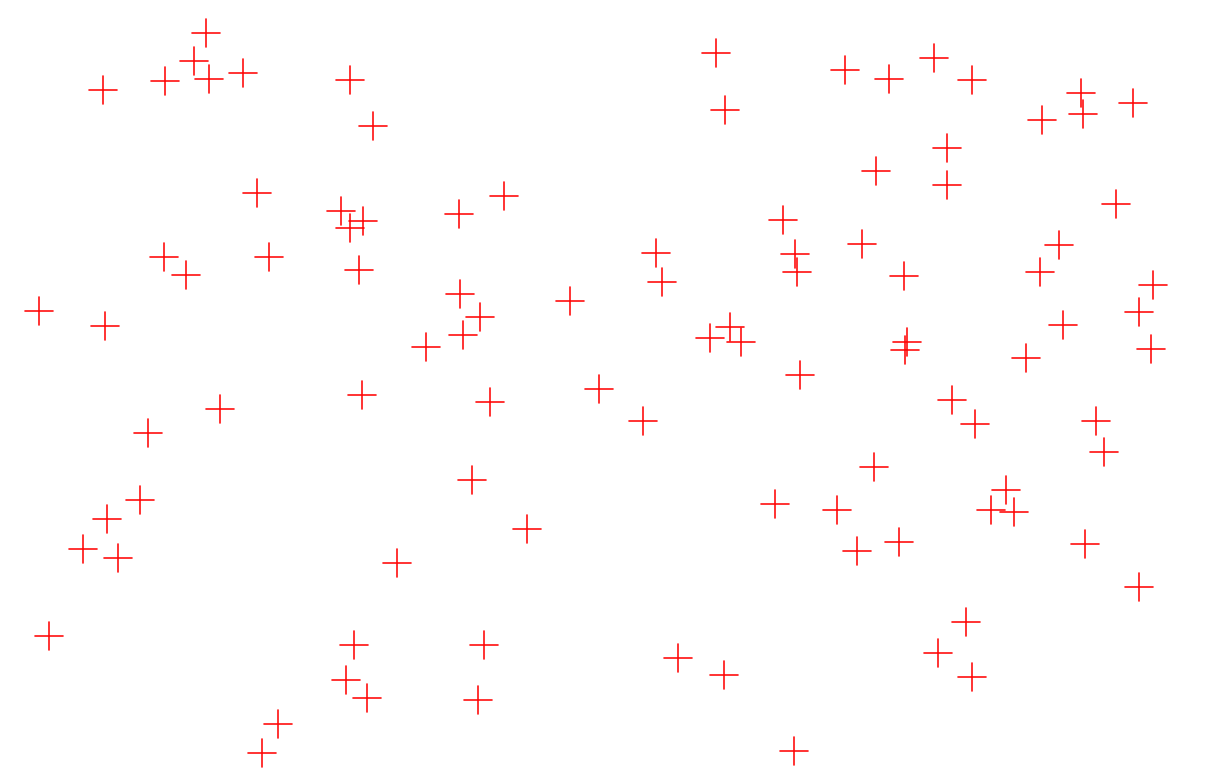
Statisticians examining data for cancer clusters must beware of random coincidences, which seem to form a pattern. In this randomly generated scatter graph, arcs and patterns appear to exist that have formed only by coincidence.

Some of the larger or more well known cancer clusters include:

- At least 700 cases of clear-cell carcinoma caused by the prenatal exposure to diethylstilbestrol in the US in the mid-1900s.
- The Camp Lejeune water contamination incident in which multiple chemicals were found in drinking water. The CDC found that marines stationed at the base had a 10% higher rate of cancer deaths than those stationed elsewhere.

== See also ==
- Biostatistics
- Cancer Alley
- Cancer epidemiology
- Cuzick–Edwards test
- Environmental racism
- Fooled by Randomness
- Toms River: A Story of Science and Salvation
