= Clustering (demographics) =

In demographics, clustering is the gathering of various populations based on ethnicity, economics, or religion.

In countries that hold equality important, clustering occurs between groups because of polarizing factors such as religion, wealth or ethnocentrism. Clustering is often considered an enriching part of free cultures in which one can visit a Chinatown or a French quarter for restaurant choices. Other sociologists assert that clustering of like minded individuals leads to political polarity and intolerance of contrary opinions, as the United States has allegedly been trending since the 1950s.

== See also ==
- Cuzick–Edwards test
- Chinatown
- French quarter
