= Cuzick–Edwards test =

Statistical significance test

In statistics, the Cuzick–Edwards test is a significance test whose aim is to detect the possible clustering of sub-populations within a clustered or non-uniformly-spread overall population. Possible applications of the test include examining the spatial clustering of childhood leukemia and lymphoma within the general population, given that the general population is spatially clustered.

The test is based on:

- using control locations within the general population as the basis of a second or "control" sub-population in addition to the original "case" sub-population;
- using "nearest-neighbour" analyses to form statistics based on either:
  - the number of other "cases" among the neighbours of each case;
  - the number "cases" which are nearer to each given case than the k-th nearest "control" for that case.

An example application of this test was to spatial clustering of leukaemias and lymphomas among young people in New Zealand.

== See also ==
- Clustering (demographics)
