= Complex suicide =

Suicide by more than one method

Complex suicide, distinguished from simple suicide (Note: A simple suicide denotes using one distinct method), is the act of intentionally causing one's death with more than one method, either simultaneously or sequentially. Suicide is a pervasive public health concern among the leading causes of death worldwide and remains geographically heterogeneous. Despite the relative ubiquity of simple suicides, complex suicides are rare, only estimated to account for between 1.5 and five percent of suicides. Though few studies have examined the prevalence or base rates of complex suicide, Demirci and associates (2009) notably found that 1.8% of cases from a pool of 878 constituted a complex suicide. Similarly, Racette and Sauvageau (2007) found that 2.1% of 893 cases in Quebec constituted a complex suicide.

Complex suicides are further distinguished from complicated suicides, which are characterized by the victim sustaining unintentional secondary trauma resulting from a single suicide method (e.g., falling injuries, drowning). Complicated suicides may also be more infrequent or less identified; Törő and Pollak (2009) found that of the 1217 suicides investigated by the Budapest Institute of Forensic Medicine, only six (0.5%) were identified as such, compared to 54 (4.4%) as complex. Due to the combined methods used by complex suicide victims, researchers have highlighted the problems related to distinguishing between this self-inflicted behavior and homicides due to resulting ambiguity.

Most research on complex suicide, of which there is little, is largely sourced from case studies and series published in forensic pathological literature by Eastern and Southern Europe and Western Asia authors.

== Characteristics ==
Complex suicide victims author a suicide note in 20-50% of cases, whilst a further 15-30% have had a history of suicide attempts, which Hösükler and associates (2022) note are jointly critical for separating the index phenomenon from said competing forensic explanations, namely homicide. Törő and Pollak (2009) noted that around 40% of their complex suicide victim had a blood alcohol concentration consistent with levels of intoxication. Similar to simple suicides, cases modally involve male, middle-aged victims, who had been diagnosed with a mental disorder (e.g., major depressive disorder).

== Classification ==
Two classifications have been popularly advanced in complex suicide literature: primary, or planned, and secondary, or unplanned. The present typology was first proposed by Macknowski and associates in 1974. In a Pallocci and associates (2024) found that planned (52.1%) complex suicides were more common than unplanned (40.2%) suicides in a sample of 261 cases.

=== Unplanned ===
Unplanned, or secondary, complex suicides are distinguished by the spontaneous use of a succeeding method upon the principal one being perceived to have failed to eliminate pain and ensure death. The feasibility of an unplanned attempt is based on the immediate availability of the method, which had not been procured. The most common types of methods underpinning these cases include sharp-force injuries (i.e., neck, arms, abdomen), asphyxia (i.e., hanging, suffocation), and falling from a height. Similarly, Törő and Pollak (2009) reported that common method used in unplanned complex suicides were self-stabbing, hanging, gunshot, and fall..

=== Planned ===
Planned, or primary, complex suicides are distinguished by the premeditated use of a succeeding method to ensure death even if the principal fails. The most common combinations of methods involved in planned cases include gunshot and hanging, plastic bag suffocation and gas inhalation, and intoxication and hanging. Törő and Pollak (2009) noted similar combinations in their sample, suggesting that sharp-force injuries are "rather rare" in the planned cases, unlike their unplanned counterparts.

== Case Examples ==
The following are a series of case examples which relate to complex suicides and the concepts elucidated above:

=== A Serbian planned case with six methods used ===
Petković and associates (2011) reported an unusual case of a 44-year-old husband and father who was found lying deceased in an isolated field next to his car. A suicide note was located inside the cabin of the vehicle along with receipts for items used in the suicide. The decedent was found having consumed hydrochloric and sulfuric acid, which resulted in sustaining chemical burns in the gastrointestinal tract. Toxicological analyses also confirmed the consumption of insecticide. The decedent had knife-wound lacerations on his wrists and neck, and stabbed himself in the face with a screwdriver, which was attributed as the cause of death. Hypothermia due to environmental exposure and hemorrhaging were considered as exacerbating factors.

=== An unplanned case involving cutting and hanging ===
Eroglu and associates (2017) reported a case of a 43-year-old, divorced male who was found in a cyanotic state at his residence before being transported to hospital. The patient first ingested pesticides two days before the present attempt. Despite first considering the use of prescription pills as a method, he, instead, attempted to cut his wrists and neck before committing to hanging. Upon attempting the second method, the cable ruptured. The patient had a history of depression and had been experiencing family conflict.

=== A planned case involving gunshot and vehicular crash ===
Straka and associates (2013) reported an unusual case of a 20-year-old male who was driving a passenger car on a straight road during evening hours. Suddenly, he passed into the opposite lane where his vehicle made contact with an oncoming truck, resulting in a collision. Upon recovery of the decedent's body, a handgun was located, in addition to self-inflicted gunshot wound on the side of his head, indicating a suicide attempt.

== External resources ==
- Crisis Centers and Resources - International Association for Suicide Prevention (IASP)

== See also ==
- List of suicide crisis lines
- Suicide
- Suicide methods
- List of countries by suicide rate
