= Physical disorder =

Disorder that has an available objective mechanical test

Physical disorder, as a medical term, is poorly defined, and typically used in contrast to a mental disorder or a genetic disorder. The term mental disorder is heavily used in psychiatric medicine, and is defined in some psychiatric medicine texts, most notably the Diagnostic and Statistical Manual of Mental Disorders (DSM). However, the more generic term of medical disorder is poorly defined, and is not mentioned in the World Health Organization's International Classification of Diseases, nor many common medical textbooks. Attempts have been made to adopt a more universal definition, but there is no widely agreed upon definition.

A physical disorder is not easily defined as the term "disorder" itself has not yet been defined by any authoritative medical body. The term "disorder" bears no special clinical relevance, and could be used interchangeably with disease. The use of the term "disorder" likely rests on historical precedent as well as the preference of the field. For example, it is common to find examples of diseases named "disorders" in psychiatry and genetics, such as autosomal dominant disorders, but uncommon in cardiology. In general, diseases called "disorders" have a relatively well understood, narrow pathophysiology, such as bipolar disorder, compared to something more generic, such as heart disease. Similarly, disorders are typically not acquired, or the result of environmental factors, such as lung disease.

A disease or illness described as a physical disorder likely impacts the musculoskeletal system and lacks an inciting injury. Examples may include webbed toes, peau deficit disorder, arthritis, or ataxia, though the latter two may also reasonably be called an immune disorder and a neurological disorder, respectively.
