= Advocacy of suicide =

Existential viewpoint

Advocacy of suicide is the public support of a pro-suicide stance. It has manifested across several cultures and subcultures throughout history.

== East Asian cultures ==
Confucianism holds that one should give up one's life, if necessary, either passively or actively, for the sake of upholding the cardinal moral values of ren (altruism) and yi (righteousness). Which is referred as "Death with Dignity" dying for a greater cause.

Seppuku was a Japanese practice of ritual suicide by disembowelment. The Japanese military during World War II encouraged and glorified kamikaze attacks, and Japanese society as a whole has been described as "suicide-tolerant" (see Suicide in Japan).

== Internet ==
Advocacy of suicide has also taken place over the Internet. A study by the British Medical Journal found that Web searches for information on suicide are likely to return sites that encourage, and even facilitate, suicide attempts. While pro-suicide resources were less frequent than neutral or anti-suicide sites, they were nonetheless easily accessible. There is some concern that such sites may push the suicidal person over the edge. Some people form suicide pacts with people they meet online. Becker writes, "Suicidal adolescent visitors risk losing their doubts and fears about committing suicide. Risk factors include peer pressure to commit suicide and appointments for joint suicides. Furthermore, some chat rooms celebrate chatters who committed suicide."

William Francis Melchert-Dinkel, 47 years old in May 2010, from Faribault, Minnesota, a licensed practical nurse from 1991 until February 2009, was convicted of encouraging people to die by suicide while he watched voyeuristically on a webcam. He told those contemplating suicide what methods worked best, that it was okay to die by suicide, that they would be better in heaven, and/or entered into suicide pacts with them. Dinkel was charged with two counts of assisting suicide, for allegedly encouraging the suicides of a person in Britain in 2005 and another person in Canada in 2008. He was convicted in 2011, and was released in 2015 after serving 178 days in jail.

There have been some legal bans on pro-suicide web sites, most notably in Australia, but some argue such bans merely increase awareness of such sites and encourage site owners to move their sites to different jurisdictions. One such example is the Sanctioned Suicide site, which has been restricted in Germany and Italy and has been blocked in Turkey.

== See also ==
- alt.suicide.holiday
- Sanctioned Suicide
- Altruistic suicide — a suicide that is done for the benefit of others
- Church of Euthanasia
- Human extinction
- Philosophy of suicide
- Right to die
- Suicide prevention
- Suicide is Painless
- Blue Whale Challenge
