= Suicide by poisoning =

Suicide method

Self-poisoning is one of the most frequent methods of suicide. Deliberate self-poisoning is one of the main methods of attempted suicide. Due to its non-violent nature, it is common to survive self-poisoning.

For example, in the United States, about 20% of suicides involve poisoning as a primary method, and nearly 70% of those who die by suicide ingest a substance before death. Self-poisoning suicides have increased in the U.S. since the 1990s, which coincides with the growing number of opioid prescriptions issued since then.

== Substances ==
In Asian countries and rural regions, most cases of suicide by poisoning involve pesticides, while in Western countries, suicides through self-poisoning are most often associated with the use of illicit or prescription drugs.

=== Pesticide ===
Share of suicide deaths from pesticide poisoning

As of 2006, worldwide, around 30% of suicides were from pesticide poisonings. It was the leading suicide method in developing countries, with about half of suicide deaths in India involving poisoning, and most of those involving pesticides. The use of this method varies markedly in different areas of the world, from 0.9% in Europe to about 50% in the Pacific region. In the US, pesticide poisoning is used in about 12 suicides per year. The overall case fatality rate for suicide attempts using pesticide is about 10–20%; the risk of death increases if the person is also drunk at the time.

Method restriction is an effective way to reduce suicide by pesticide poisoning. In Finland, limiting access to parathion in the 1960s resulted in a rapid decline in both poisoning-related suicides and total suicide deaths for several years, and a slower decline in subsequent years. In Sri Lanka, both suicide by pesticide and total suicides declined after first toxicity class I and later class II endosulfan were banned. Overall suicide deaths were cut by 70%, with 93,000 lives saved over 20 years as a result of banning these pesticides. In Korea, banning a single pesticide, paraquat, halved the number of suicides by pesticide poisoning and reduced the total number of suicides in that country.

=== Drug overdose ===
A drug overdose involves taking a dose of a drug that exceeds safe levels. In the UK (England and Wales) until 2013, a drug overdose was the most common suicide method in women. In 2019 the percentage was 16% in males. Self-poisoning accounts for the highest number of non-fatal suicide attempts. In the United States about 60% of suicide attempts and 14% of suicide deaths involve drug overdoses. The risk of death in suicide attempts involving overdose is about 2%.

Overdose attempts using painkillers are among the most common, due to their easy availability over-the-counter. Paracetamol (also called acetaminophen) is the most widely used analgesic worldwide and is commonly used in overdose attempts. Paracetamol poisoning is a common cause of acute liver failure. If not treated, the overdose produces a long and painful illness, with symptoms of nausea, vomiting, sweating, and abdominal pain appearing several hours after ingestion and continuing for several days. People who take overdoses of paracetamol do not fall asleep or lose consciousness, although most people who attempt suicide with paracetamol wrongly believe that they will be rendered unconscious by the drug. Method-specific restriction through reducing package size in the UK and Ireland has reduced suicide deaths by drug overdose.

=== Carbon monoxide ===
A particular type of poisoning involves the inhalation of high levels of carbon monoxide (CO). Death usually occurs through hypoxia. A nonfatal attempt can result in memory loss and other symptoms.

Carbon monoxide is a colorless and odorless gas, so its presence cannot be detected by sight or smell. It acts by binding preferentially to the hemoglobin in the bloodstream, displacing oxygen molecules and progressively deoxygenating the blood, eventually resulting in the failure of cellular respiration and death. Carbon monoxide is extremely dangerous to bystanders and people who may discover the body; right-to-die advocate Philip Nitschke has therefore recommended against this method.

Before air quality regulations and catalytic converters, suicide by carbon monoxide poisoning was often achieved by running a car's engine in an enclosed space such as a garage, or by redirecting a running car's exhaust back inside the cabin with a hose. Motor car exhaust may have contained up to 25% carbon monoxide. Catalytic converters found on all modern automobiles eliminate over 99% of carbon monoxide produced. As a further complication, the amount of unburned gasoline in emissions can make exhaust unbearable to breathe well before a person loses consciousness.

Charcoal-burning suicide induces death from carbon monoxide poisoning. Originally used in Hong Kong, it spread to Japan, where small charcoal-burning heaters (hibachi) or stoves (shichirin) have been used in a sealed room. By 2001, this method accounted for 25% of deaths from suicide in Japan. Nonfatal attempts can result in severe brain damage due to cerebral anoxia.

=== Household gas ===
Gas-oven suicide was a common method of suicide in the early to mid-20th centuries in some North American and European countries. Household gas was originally coal gas, also called illuminating gas, or town gas, which was composed of methane, hydrogen and carbon monoxide. Stoves of this era required one to manually ignite a pilot light with a match; without the combustion the gas cloud would spread unimpeded. Carbon monoxide poisoning was the proximate cause of death. Natural gas, introduced in the 1960s, is composed of methane, ethane and an odorant added for safety. The suicide rates by domestic gas fell from 1960 to 1980, as changes were made to the formula to make it less lethal.

=== Hydrogen sulfide ===
The gas, produced by mixing certain household ingredients, was used in a suicide wave in 2008 in Japan. The wave prompted staff at Tokyo's suicide prevention center to set up a special hotline during "Golden Week", as they received an increase in calls from people wanting to kill themselves during the annual May holiday.

As of 2010, this phenomenon has occurred in a number of US cities, prompting warnings to those arriving at the site of the suicide.

In 2020, H_{2}S ingestion was used as a suicide method by Japanese pro wrestler Hana Kimura.

In 2024, Lucy-Bleu Knight, stepdaughter of famed musician Slash, also used H_{2}S ingestion to commit suicide.

=== Sodium nitrite ===
Several academic publications in 2020 and 2021 discussed the toxicity of sodium nitrite, and an apparent recent increase in suicides using sodium nitrite which had been ordered online. The usage of sodium nitrite as a suicide method has been heavily discussed on suicide forums, primarily Sanctioned Suicide.

Sodium nitrite was also the focal-point of the McCarthy et al. v Amazon lawsuit alleging that Amazon knowingly assisted in the deaths of healthy children by selling them "suicide kits" as Amazon's "frequently bought together" feature recommended buying sodium nitrite, an antiemetic, and a suicide instruction book together. This lawsuit was dismissed in June 2023. On February 19, 2026, the Washington Supreme Court ruled unanimously that Amazon.com must face lawsuits brought by families with relatives who took their own lives by consuming sodium nitrite they bought on the online retailer's platform. It rejected a lower court's ruling that the families could not pursue negligence claims under a Washington state product liability law, because suicide was a superseding cause of their relatives' deaths. The online marketplace eBay has globally prohibited the sale of sodium nitrite since 2019. In 2023, legislation was introduced in the United States with the aim of deeming sodium nitrite products with a sodium nitrite concentration of greater than 10% by volume to be banned consumer products under the Consumer Product Safety Act. Kenneth Law, a Canadian distributor of sodium nitrite, was convicted of assisting suicide in 2026.

In cases of suspected suicide attempts involving sodium nitrite, it is critical that responding individuals administer immediate intravenous methylene blue. Methylene blue is the antidote to the methemoglobinemia caused by intentional ingestion of sodium nitrite as a suicide agent.

== Suicide pill ==
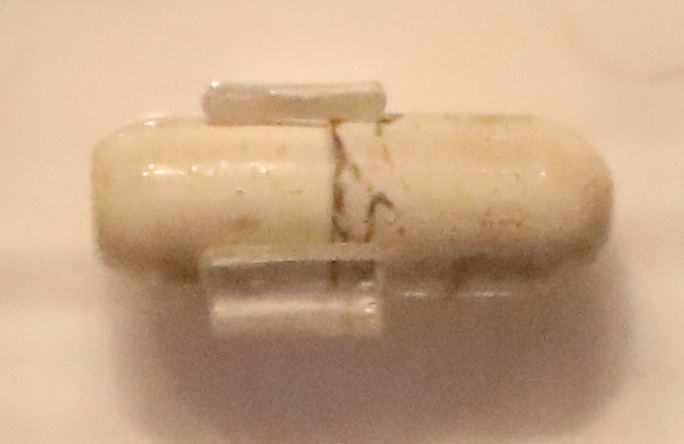
Special Operations Executive suicide pill from World War II

A suicide pill (also known as the cyanide pill, kill-pill, lethal pill, death-pill, cyanide capsule, or L-pill) is a pill, capsule, ampoule, or tablet containing a fatally poisonous substance that a person ingests deliberately to achieve death quickly through suicide. Military and espionage organizations have provided their agents in danger of being captured by the enemy with suicide pills and devices which can be used to avoid an imminent and far more unpleasant death (such as through torture), or to ensure that they cannot be interrogated and forced to disclose secret information. As a result, lethal pills have important psychological value to persons carrying out missions with a high risk of capture and interrogation.

The term "poison pill" is also used colloquially for a policy or legal action set up by an institution that has fatal or highly unpleasant consequences for that institution if a certain event occurs. Examples include the so-called "poison pill" clauses inserted in corporate charters as a takeover defence, and wrecking amendments added to legislative bills.
