= Social media and suicide =

Since the rise of social media, there have been numerous cases of individuals being influenced towards committing suicide or self-harm through their use of social media, and even of individuals arranging to broadcast suicide attempts, some successful, on social media. The study of the relationship between social media and suicide aims to determine the risks social media poses in terms of suicide, and to identify methods of mitigating such risks.

== Background ==
Suicide is one of the leading causes of death worldwide, and as of 2020, the second leading cause of death in the United States for those aged 15–34. According to the Center for Disease Control and Prevention, suicide was the third leading cause of death among adolescents in the US, from 1999 to 2006.

In 2020, people in the US had a suicide rate of 13.5 per 100,000. Suicide was a leading cause of death in the United States accounting for 48,183 deaths in 2021. Suicide rates increased by 30 percent from 2000 to 2018 and declined in 2019 and 2020.

Suicide remains a significant public health issue worldwide, despite prevention efforts and treatments. Suicide has been identified not only as an individual phenomenon but also as being influenced by social and environmental factors. There is growing evidence that online activity has influenced suicide-related behavior. The use of social media throughout the 21st century has grown exponentially. For this reason, there are a variety of sources that are accessible to the public in various forms, especially social media sites such as Facebook, Instagram, Twitter, YouTube, Snapchat, TikTok and many more. Although these platforms were intended to allow people to connect virtually, these platforms can lead to cyber-bullying, insecurity, and emotional distress, and sometimes may influence a person to attempt suicide.

Bullying, whether on social media or elsewhere, physical or not, significantly increases victims' risk of suicidal behavior. Since social media was introduced some people have taken their lives as a result of cyberbullying. Furthermore, suicide rates among teenagers have increased from 2010 to 2022 as social media has become something that people interact with more throughout their day-to-day lives.

Media algorithms tend to popularize videos and posts to inform the country of the rising trouble, which may create a popular appeal to the young and immature minds of teenagers. This is why, social media could provide higher risks with the promotion of different kinds of pro-suicidal sites, message boards, chat rooms, and forums. Moreover, the Internet not only reports suicide incidents but documents suicide methods (for example, suicide pacts, an agreement between two or more people to kill themselves at a particular time and often by the same lethal means). Therefore, the role the Internet plays, particularly social media, in suicide-related behavior is a topic of growing interest.

== Cyberbullying ==
There is substantial evidence that the Internet and social media can influence suicide-related behavior. Such evidence includes an increase in exposure to graphic content. A research study conducted by Sameer Hinduja and Justin Patchin found a correlation between cyberbullying and suicide. According to their findings, cyber-bullying increases suicidal thoughts by 14.5 percent and suicide attempts by 8.7 percent. Particularly alarming is the fact that children and young people under 25 who are victims of cyberbullying are more than twice as likely to self-harm and engage in suicidal behavior. Overall, teen suicide rates have increased within the past decade.This presents a significant public health concern, with over 40,000 suicides in the United States and nearly one million worldwide annually.

Adolescents involved in cyberbullying often downplay its seriousness by calling it a joke or blaming the victim. These moral disengagement strategies can normalize harmful behavior and reduce feelings of guilt. This normalization may increase emotional distress and contribute to risks like depression and suicidal thoughts.

Recent data from the Centers for Disease Control and Prevention reveals that 14.9 per cent of teenagers have experienced online bullying, while 13.6 per cent of teenagers have seriously attempted suicide. Both of these incidents are in increasing numbers in the United States. Furthermore, in numerous recent incidents, cyber-bullying led the victim to die by suicide; this phenomenon is now known as cyberbullicide. Many parents and children are unaware of the dangers and potential legal consequences of cyberbullying. As a response, anti-bullying regulations implemented by schools aim to prevent any form of bullying, including through technology, and protect students from online harassment. While some states have enacted laws against cyberbullying, there are currently no federal regulations addressing this issue.

== Social media's influence on suicide ==
The media may portray suicidal behavior or language which can potentially influence people to act on these suicidal ideation. This may include news reports of actual suicides that have occurred or television shows and films that reenact suicides.

A survey has found that suicide-risk individuals who went online for suicide-related purposes, compared with online users who did not, reported greater suicide-risk symptoms, were less likely to seek help and perceived less social support.

Some organizations have proposed guidelines about how the media should report suicide. There is evidence that compliance with the guidelines varies. Some research showed that it is unclear whether the guidelines have successfully reduced the number of suicides. On the contrary, other research studies stated that the guidelines have worked in some cases.

== Impact of pro-suicidal sites, message boards, chat rooms and forums ==
Social media platforms have transformed traditional methods of communication by allowing instantaneous and interactive sharing of information created and controlled by individuals, groups, organizations, and governments. As of the third quarter of 2022, Facebook had 266 million monthly active users, between Canada and the US. An immense quantity of information on the topic of suicide is available on the Internet and via social media. The information available on social media on the topic of suicide can influence suicidal behavior, both negatively and positively.

The social cognitive theory plays a vital role in suicide attempts influenced through social media. This theory is demonstrated when one is influenced by what they see through various processes that form into modeled behaviors. This can be shown when people post their suicide attempts online or promote suicidal behavior in general.

Contributors to these social media platforms may also exert peer pressure and encourage others to take their own lives, idolize those who have died by suicide, and facilitate suicide pacts. For example, on a Japanese message board in 2008, it was shared that people can kill themselves using hydrogen sulfide gas. Shortly afterwards, 220 people attempted suicide in this way, and 208 completed suicide. Biddle et al. conducted a systematic Web search of 12 suicide-associated terms (e.g., suicide, suicide methods, how to kill yourself, and best suicide methods) to analyze the search results, and found that pro-suicide sites and chat rooms that discussed general issues associated with suicide most often occurred within the first few hits of a search. In another study, 373 suicide-related websites were found using Internet search engines and examined. Among them, 31% were suicide-neutral, 29% were anti-suicide, and 11% were pro-suicide. Together, these studies have shown that obtaining pro-suicide information on the Internet, including detailed information on suicide methods, is very easy.

While social media has been prevalent in young adult suicide, some young adults find comfort and solace through these platforms. Young adults are making connections with people in like situations that are helping them feel less lonely. Although the public opinion is that message boards are harmful, the following studies show how they point to suicide prevention and have positive influences. A study using content analysis analyzed all of the postings on the AOL Suicide Bulletin Board over 11 months and concluded that most contributions contained positive, empathetic, and supportive postings. Then, a multi-method study was able to demonstrate that the users of such forums experience a great deal of social support and only a small amount of social strain. Lastly, in the survey participants were asked to assess the extent of their suicidal thoughts on a 7-level scale (0, absolutely no suicidal thoughts, to 7, very strong suicidal thoughts) for the time directly before their first forum visit and at the time of the survey. The study found a significant reduction after using the forum. The study however cannot conclude the forum is the only reason for the decrease. Together, these studies show how forums can reduce the number of suicides.

An example of how social media can play a role in suicide is that of a male adolescent who arrived at the emergency department with his parents after suspected medication ingestion in which he attempted to overdose. Beforehand, he had sent an ex-girlfriend a Snapchat picture of himself holding a bottle of acetaminophen, which was forwarded to the young male's parents. This picture was used by medical experts to establish the time of his ingestion; oral N-acetylcysteine was administered and he was brought to a pediatric care facility, where he had a stable recovery and psychiatric evaluation.

In 2013, the main cause of nine teen suicides was due to hateful anonymous messages on Ask.fm.

Although there are concerns that the Internet may be a dangerous platform, where suicidal people might find suicide methods or encouragement to kill themselves, research has shown that the internet is more likely to have a positive than a negative influence.

== Cyberbullying and suicide ==
Cyberbullying has received considerable attention as a possible cause of suicide. With the rise of social media, the risk of falling victim to blackmail has also increased. It has been deemed a major health concern for affected teens and a major health threat to those affected by the psychological trauma inflicted by perpetrators on social media. While there isn't one Federal Law that is specific to cyberbullying, 48 states have laws against cyberbullying or online harassment with 44 of those states having criminal sanctions within the laws. Many states have enhanced their harassment laws to include online harassment. Criminal harassment statutes often provide a basis for bringing charges in severe cases, and more serious criminal charges have been brought in cases where evidence indicates a resultant suicide or other tragic consequences. Civil remedies have been sought in many cases where criminal liability was difficult to prove.

In 2006, 13 year old Megan Meier hanged herself in her bedroom closet following a series of MySpace messages that came from a friend's mother and her 18 year old associate, who posed as a 16-year-old boy named "Josh Evans" and encouraged Megan to commit suicide. The mother, Lori Drew, faced federal conspiracy charges related to computer fraud and abuse (see United States v. Drew), but was later acquitted.

In 2012, Canadian high school student Amanda Todd hanged herself after being blackmailed by a stalker, and suffering from repeated cyberbullying and harassment at school. On September 7, Todd posted a 9-minute YouTube video titled My story: Struggling, bullying, suicide, self-harm, which showed her using a series of flashcards to tell of her experiences being bullied. The video went viral after her death on October 10, 2012, receiving over 1,600,000 views by October 13, 2012, with news websites from around the world linking to it.

In 2014, Conrad Roy killed himself after exchanging numerous text messages with Michelle Carter, his long-distance girlfriend, who repeatedly encouraged him to commit suicide. She was found guilty of involuntary manslaughter, and sentenced to 15 months in prison. Carter was released in January 2020.

Sadie Riggs, a Pennsylvania teen, killed herself in 2015 allegedly because of online bullying and harassment at school on her appearance. Sadie's aunt, Sarah Smith, contacted various social media companies, police, and Sadie's school in hopes to make the bullying stop. In desperation, Smith went as far as to break Sadie's phone, in her presence, in an attempt to stop the bullying. No charges were ever filed against any alleged suspect.

In May 2016, public scrutiny intensified following investigative reports in Russian media concerning online "death groups," most notably a community known as "F57" on the social network VKontakte (VK). These groups were linked to the emergence of the "Blue Whale Challenge," an internet phenomenon where anonymous coordinators allegedly used psychological manipulation to assign vulnerable teenagers a series of escalating self-harm tasks over a 50-day period, culminating in instructions to commit suicide. Prior to these investigative reports, administrators of these groups had weaponised the image and story of Renata Kambolina, a Russian student who committed suicide the previous November, to promote their communities; however, subsequent investigations confirmed she had no prior contact or involvement with the groups. The media coverage sparked a widespread moral panic across Russia. While subsequent investigations and experts questioned the direct causal link between these specific online groups and the broader rise in youth suicides, the controversy led to increased platform moderation, legislative efforts to increase punishments for inciting suicide online, and temporary access restrictions in international regions. Following criminal investigations into the network of online administrators, Russian law enforcement arrested several individuals accused of managing these groups. In 2016, 21-year-old Philipp Budeikin, an early administrator of the F57 group who operated on VK under the pseudonym "Philipp Lis" (Fox), was detained. Budeikin eventually pled guilty to charges of inciting teenagers to commit suicide. In July 2017, a Siberian court sentenced him to three years and four months in prison. Other administrators, including 26-year-old Ilya Sidorov, were also arrested and confessed to managing similar chat groups that targeted underage users.

In 2016, Chien Chih-cheng, a Taiwanese animal shelter director, committed suicide after appearing in a television program about animal euthanasia. Chien, an animal lover, was charged with euthanizing stray pets as a result of overcrowding in Taiwan's shelters. After appearing on the program, she was branded as an "executioner" and "female butcher", and she and the shelter she operated were subject to intense cyberbullying and abuse. She later died by injecting herself with the same substance she used to euthanize pets, leaving a note communicating that "all lives are equal".

In a 2018 Florida case, two preteens were arrested and charged with cyberstalking after they were accused of cyberbullying another female middle school student, 12 year old Gabriella Green. Online rumors were spread about her, and she hanged herself immediately after a call with one of the abusers, who told her that "If you're going to do it, just do it" and ended the call, according to police.

In October 2008, South Korean model and actor Kim Ji-hoo committed suicide by hanging at his home in Seoul after facing online harassment for being gay, with his personal blog flooded with hateful comments.

In 2019, Canadian Inuk pop singer Kelly Fraser, who was most popular for her Inuktitut language covers of pop songs, was found dead in her home near Winnipeg, Manitoba. Her death was ruled a suicide, which Fraser's family attributed to "childhood traumas, racism, and persistent cyberbullying."

Austrian doctor Lisa-Maria Kellermayr committed suicide in 2022 after a tweet she made criticizing opponents to COVID-19 measures caused her to become a target of death threats, intimidation and abuse.

== Media contagion effect ==
Suicide contagion can be viewed within the larger context of behavioral contagion, which has been described as a situation in which the same behavior spreads quickly and spontaneously through a group. Suicide contagion refers to the phenomenon of indirect exposure to suicide or suicidal behaviors influencing others to attempt to kill themselves. The persons most susceptible to suicide contagions are those under 25 years of age. Media coverage of suicides has been shown to significantly increase the rate of suicide, and the magnitude of the increase is related to the amount, duration, and prominence of coverage.

A study in 2011 by Dunlop et al. specifically examined possible contagion effects on suicidal behavior via the Internet and social media. Of 719 individuals aged 14 to 24 years, 79% reported being exposed to suicide-related content through family, friends, and traditional news media such as newspapers, and 59% found such content through Internet sources. This information may pose a hazard for vulnerable groups by influencing decisions to die by suicide. In particular, interactions via chat rooms or discussion forums may foster peer pressure to die by suicide, encourage users to idolize those who have died by suicide, or facilitate suicide pacts. Recently there has been a trend in creating memorial social media pages in honor of a deceased person. In New Zealand, a memorial page was made after a person died by suicide, this resulted in the suicide of eight other persons thereafter, which further shows the power of the media contagion effect. One South Korean study demonstrated that social media data can be used to predict national suicide numbers.

== Suicide notes ==
It has generally been found that those who post suicide notes online tend to not receive help.

Several notable cases support this argument:

- Kevin Whitrick and Abraham K. Biggs webcast both of their suicides. "I am going to leave this for whoever stumbles across my bookmarks later on."
- Paul Zolezzi indicated via a Facebook update his intent to commit suicide.
- In 2010, John Patrick Bedell left a Wikipedia user page and YouTube videos interpreted by some as a suicide note; the former was deleted by Wikipedia administrators.
- Joe Stack also posted a suicide note online.
- Chris McKinstry, an AI researcher, died by suicide after posting a note to both his blog and the Joel on Software off-topic forum explaining the reasons for his demise.
- A girl who attended a Louisville-area high school posted a video suicide note and then killed herself in 2014. The girl did not receive any help prior to her suicide, leading H. Eric Sparks, director of the American School Counselor Association, to say that troubled students should be directed to help hotlines or to trusted authorities to seek intervention as quickly as possible.
- Renata Kambolina, a Russian student who died by suicide in November 2015, uploaded photographic self-portraits to the social media platform VK captioned "nya.bye." She received no intervention or help prior to her trackside passing the next day. She had previously experienced a mental health crisis in 2014, during which she walked to a local bridge with the intention of jumping but chose to leave the scene safely. In the aftermath of her death, the online response included the unauthorized leak of graphic crime scene photographs and the generation of derisive internet memes. Some online factions romanticized the event, falsely framing her as a virtual icon and mimicking her final post, which was followed by a series of emulative suicides and suicide attempts among platform users, including Gleb Korablyov. Her identity and image were retroactively co-opted by administrators of online "death groups" to promote the "Blue Whale Challenge," a cyberbullying phenomenon that did not exist at the time of her death. Subsequent investigations confirmed she had no involvement with these communities, and the associated groups were not verified to be directly linked to any suicides until three weeks later. To oppose this exploitation, mental health advocates and online communities launched counter-movements such as the "Pink Whale Challenge" to promote mental wellness, highlight her humanity, and repurpose her likeness for suicide prevention and internet safety campaigns

== Suicide pacts ==
A suicide pact is an agreement between two or more people to die by suicide at a particular time and often by the same lethal means. Although suicide pacts are found to be rare however, there are traditional suicide pacts that have typically developed among individuals who know each other, such as a couple of friends. Additionally, a suicide pact that has been formed or developed in some way through the use of the Internet is known as a cyber suicide pact. A primary difference between cyber suicide pacts and traditional suicide pacts is that these pacts are usually formed among strangers. They mostly use online chat rooms and virtual bulletin boards and forums as an unmediated avenue to share their feelings with other like-minded individuals, which can be easier than talking about such thoughts and feelings in person.

The first documented use of the Internet to form a suicide pact was reported in Japan in 2000. It has now become a more common form of suicide in Japan, where the suicide rate increased from 34 suicides in 2003 to 91 suicides in 2005. Also, South Korea now has one of the world's highest suicide rates (24.7/100 000 in 2005), and evidence exists that cyber suicide pacts may account for almost one-third of suicides in that country. Suicide pacts are also in the United States. In April 2018, Macon Middle School, a middle school in North Carolina, became aware of a group on social media called "Edgy" or "Edgy Fan Page 101" in which this group came up with a suicide pact and had suicidal ideations. The middle school contacted the parents and informed them to look into their children's social media pages and talk with them about the dangers of a group like this.

Gerald Krein and William Francis Melchert-Dinkel were accused of arranging internet suicide pacts.

== Interventions ==
Suicide intervention on social media has saved many lives on Twitter, Instagram, and Facebook. All of the aforementioned companies have slightly different ways to report posts that may seem suicidal.

Jurisdictional hindrances have sometimes prevented governments from effectively restricting pro-suicide sites and sites that describe suicide methods. In 2008, police in the United Kingdom expressed concern that "Internet cults" and the desire for achieving prestige via online memorials may encourage suicides.

=== Facebook ===
Facebook, assisted by, among a handful of other experts, Dr. Dan Reidenburg of Suicide Awareness Voices of Education—"uses an algorithm to track down buzzwords and phrases that are commonly associated with suicide" and has intervened in over 3,500 cases, according to company reports. The algorithm reportedly tracks buzzwords and phrases associated with suicide and an alert is sent to Facebook's Safety Center.

"The technology itself isn't going to send somebody to their house. A person at Facebook would have to do that..."

–Dr. Dan Reidenburg

=== Twitter ===
- Demi Moore and her followers intervened to stop a suicide that had been announced on Twitter.
- Twitter followers of Chicago rapper CupcakKe alerted authorities after the rapper posted ominous phrases onto Twitter. She later thanked all of her followers after receiving help.
- Cardi B after posting a scandalous editorial photo. Is criticized on X by a user who claims she "lacks virtue, self-respect and dignity". Cardi B replied to the tweet in a now delete tweet asking if she should take her own life

=== Forums ===
- A South German was prevented from killing himself after Spanish internet users saw him announcing his decision.

== Discussion and support groups ==
The Defense Centers of Excellence have expressed interest in using social media for suicide prevention. Facebook groups have sometimes been set up for suicide prevention purposes, including one that attracted 47,000 members. Although many teens and preteens encounter suicide-related posts from peers on different social media apps, they also encounter suicide prevention hotlines and website links as well.

SAMHSA's Suicide Prevention Lifeline operates on Twitter, Facebook, and YouTube. The American Foundation For Suicide Prevention is trying to understand and prevent suicide through research, education, and advocacy.

== See also ==
- Blue Whale Challenge
- Death and the Internet
- Deaths linked to chatbots
- Death of Conrad Roy
- Instagram's impact on people
- Internet homicide
- Suicide of Gleb Korablyov
- Suicide of Ronnie McNutt
- Livestreamed suicide
- Virtual crime
- The Com
- alt.suicide.holiday
- Sanctioned Suicide
