= Colton Ryan =

American actor (born 1995)

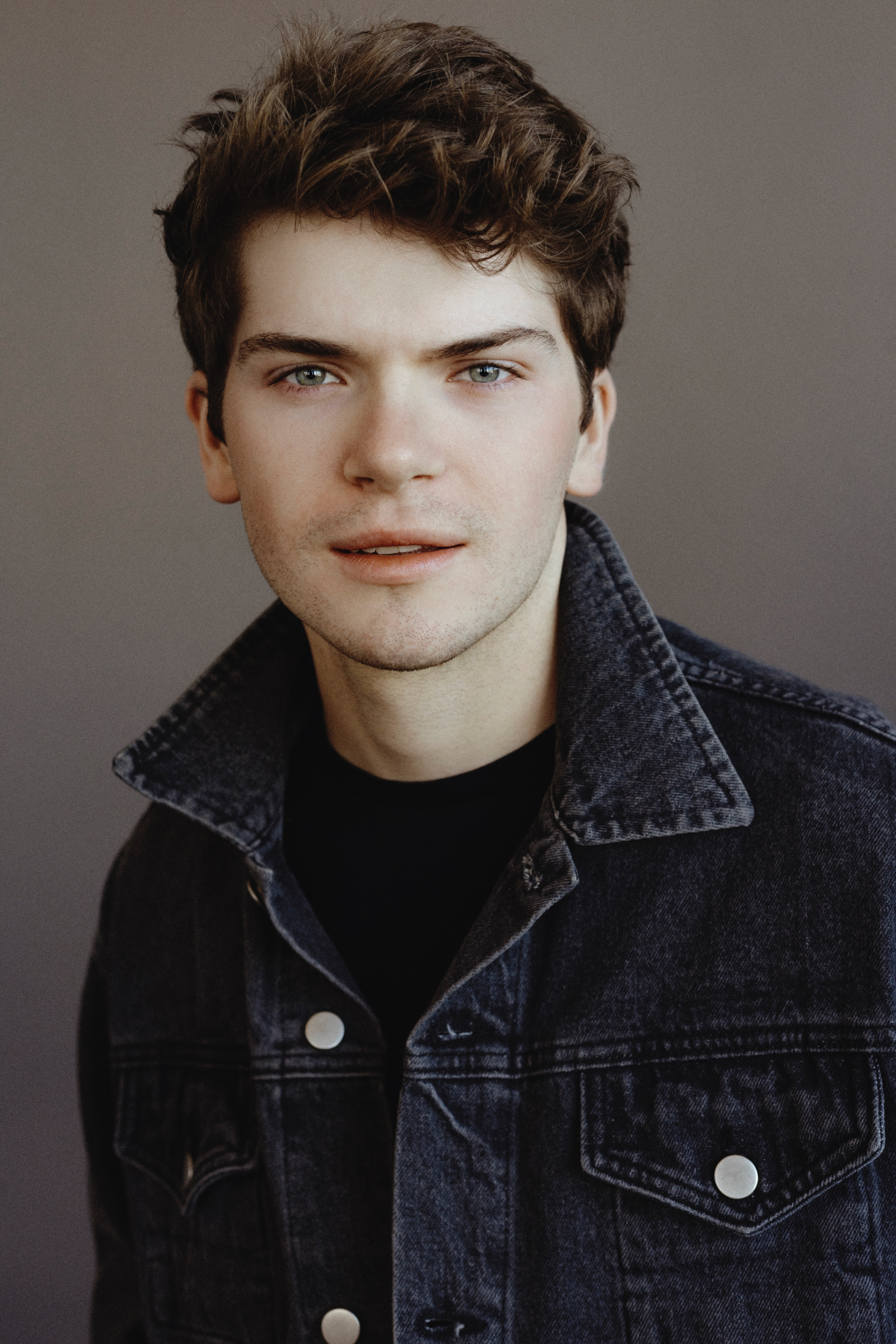
- Ryan in October 2017
- Born: June 10, 1995 (age 31); Lexington, Kentucky, U.S.
- Education: Baldwin Wallace University (BM)
- Occupations: Actor; singer
- Years active: 2015–present

Colton Ryan (born June 10, 1995) is an American actor and singer. He is known for his performance as Conrad Roy in Hulu's miniseries, The Girl from Plainville (2022), for which he garnered critical acclaim, and for playing Connor Murphy, a role which he understudied in the Broadway musical Dear Evan Hansen and reprised in the 2021 film adaptation. He is also known for playing the main role of Samuel on the Apple TV+ series Little Voice and originating the roles of Gene Laine in Girl from the North Country and Jim Doyle in New York, New York, the latter of which earning him a nomination for the Tony Award for Best Leading Actor in a Musical.

== Early life ==
Ryan was born and raised in Lexington, Kentucky. He attended the School for the Creative and Performing Arts (SCAPA) for grades four through twelve, where he majored in vocal music and minored in theatre. He also is a Governor's School for the Arts 2011 alumnus for musical theatre. His acting career took off in 2015 while attending Baldwin Wallace University, when he played Dickon in the Idaho Shakespeare Festival production of The Secret Garden.

== Career ==
He made his Broadway debut in 2016 as the standby for Evan Hansen, Connor Murphy and Jared Kleinman in Dear Evan Hansen. He remained with the show until 2017, when he graduated with his Bachelor of Fine Arts degree from Baldwin Wallace University. That same year, he made his television debut in a guest role on Law & Order: Special Victims Unit and then played the recurring role of J.J. Elkins on the Showtime series Homeland the following year.

In 2019, he originated the role of White Rabbit / Alfred Hallam / March Hare in the Off-Broadway production of Alice by Heart and made his film acting debut in The Social Ones and Adam. In 2020, he starred in the Bob Dylan musical Girl from the North Country as Gene Laine, a role in which he originated in the 2018 Off-Broadway production, but the production was shut down that May due to the COVID-19 pandemic.

In 2020, he starred in the main role of Samuel on the Apple TV+ series Little Voice and as Bruce in the Amazon Studios film Uncle Frank. It was also announced that year that he would reprise the role of Connor Murphy in Stephen Chbosky's film adaptation of Dear Evan Hansen, which premiered as the Opening Night Gala Presentation of the 2021 Toronto International Film Festival, and was followed by a theatrical release on September 24, 2021.

In 2021, he was cast opposite Elle Fanning in the Hulu drama series The Girl from Plainville, based on the death of Conrad Roy. His work in the series received critical acclaim, with TV Guide listing it as one of the 20 best TV performances of 2022.

Ryan was nominated for the Tony Award for Best Leading Actor in a Musical in 2023, for his performance as Jimmy Doyle in New York, New York.

== Acting credits ==
=== Theatre ===
| Year(s) | Title | Role | Location | Notes | Ref. |
|---|---|---|---|---|---|
| 2015 | The Secret Garden | Dickon | Idaho Shakespeare Festival | Regional | |
| 2016 | My Fair Lady | Freddy Eynsford-Hill | Great Lakes Theater | Regional | |
| 2016 | West Side Story | Tony | John Patrick Theatre | Regional | |
| 2016–2017 | Dear Evan Hansen | s/b Evan Hansen s/b Connor Murphy s/b Jared Kleinman | Music Box Theater | Broadway | |
| 2018 | Girl From the North Country | Gene Laine | The Public Theater | Off-Broadway | |
| 2019 | Alice by Heart | White Rabbit / Alfred Hallam / March Hare | MCC Theater | Off-Broadway | |
| 2019 | West Side Story | Tony | Lexington Opera House | Regional | |
| 2020 | Girl From the North Country | Gene Laine | Belasco Theatre | Broadway | |
| 2022 | The Pirates of Penzance | Frederic | American Airlines Theatre | Broadway | |
| 2023 | New York, New York | Jimmy Doyle | St. James Theatre | Broadway | |
| 2024 | Glory Days | Will | Symphony Space | Off-Broadway | |

=== Film ===
| Year | Title | Role | Notes | Ref. |
|---|---|---|---|---|
| 2019 | The Social Ones | Dan Summers | | |
| 2019 | Adam | Brad | | |
| 2020 | Uncle Frank | Bruce | | |
| 2021 | Dear Evan Hansen | Connor Murphy | | |
| 2026 | The Debut | Zachary | | |

=== Television ===
| Year | Title | Role | Notes | Ref. |
|---|---|---|---|---|
| 2017 | Law & Order: Special Victims Unit | Andrew Drake | Episode: "No Good Reason" | |
| 2018 | Homeland | J.J. Elkins | 3 episodes | |
| 2018 | The Americans | Vince | Episode: "The Great Patriotic War" | |
| 2020 | Little Voice | Samuel | Main role | |
| 2022 | The Girl from Plainville | Conrad Roy | Main role | |
| 2023 | Poker Face | Jed | Episode: "The Night Shift" | |
| 2025 | Devil in Disguise: John Wayne Gacy | Billy Kindred | Episode: "Billy" | |
| 2025–2026 | Chad Powers | Gerry Dougan | 5 episodes | |
| TBA | Discretion | Boone | Upcoming series | |

== Awards and nominations ==
| Year | Association | Category | Project | Result | Ref. |
|---|---|---|---|---|---|
| 2019 | Theatre World Award | Outstanding Debut Performance | Girl from the North Country | Won | |
| 2023 | Tony Award | Best Leading Actor in a Musical | New York, New York | Nominated | |
