= Discretion (TV series) =

American television series

- Genre: Legal thriller
- Created by: Chandler Baker
- Based on: Discretion by Chandler Baker
- Starring: Elle Fanning; Nicole Kidman; Stephan James; Josh Lucas; Colton Ryan
- Country of origin: United States
- Original language: English

Production
- Executive producers: Susannah Grant; Chandler Baker; Elle Fanning; Dakota Fanning; Brittany Kahan Ward; Nicole Kidman; Per Saari; Joe Hipps; Jordan Cerf; Matt Shakman
- Production companies: A24; Lewellen Pictures; Blossom Films; Cut To; Linden Entertainment

Original release
- Network: Paramount+

Discretion is an upcoming American legal thriller created by Chandler Baker, from her short story of the same name. It stars Elle Fanning and Nicole Kidman who are both executive producers.

== Premise ==
A lawyer discovers a web of NDAs masking a dark truth at a prestigious law firm.

== Cast and characters ==
=== Main ===
- Elle Fanning as Lenny
- Nicole Kidman as Sharon
- Stephan James as Logan
- Josh Lucas as Greg
- Colton Ryan as Boone

=== Recurring ===
- Zazie Beetz
- Ben Foster
- Stella Baker
- John Hoogenakker

== Production ==
=== Development ===
In September 2025, it was announced Elle Fanning and Nicole Kidman would star in the series and serve as executive producers, with Chandler Baker adapting from a short story she wrote and A24 set to produce. In October 2025, the series landed at Paramount+ with a straight-to-series order. Matt Shakman serve as an executive producer and director the first four episodes.

=== Casting ===
Upon the series announcement, Elle Fanning and Nicole Kidman were set to star. In July 2026, Josh Lucas joined the cast of the series. In August 2026, Stephan James and Colton Ryan joined the cast. In September 2026, Zazie Beetz, Ben Foster, Stella Baker, and John Hoogenakker joined the cast in recurring roles.

=== Filming ===
Principal photography began in August 2026, in New Jersey.

== Release ==
The series is expected to premiere in 2027.
