= Sanctioned Suicide =

Internet forum for suicide discussion

- Logo

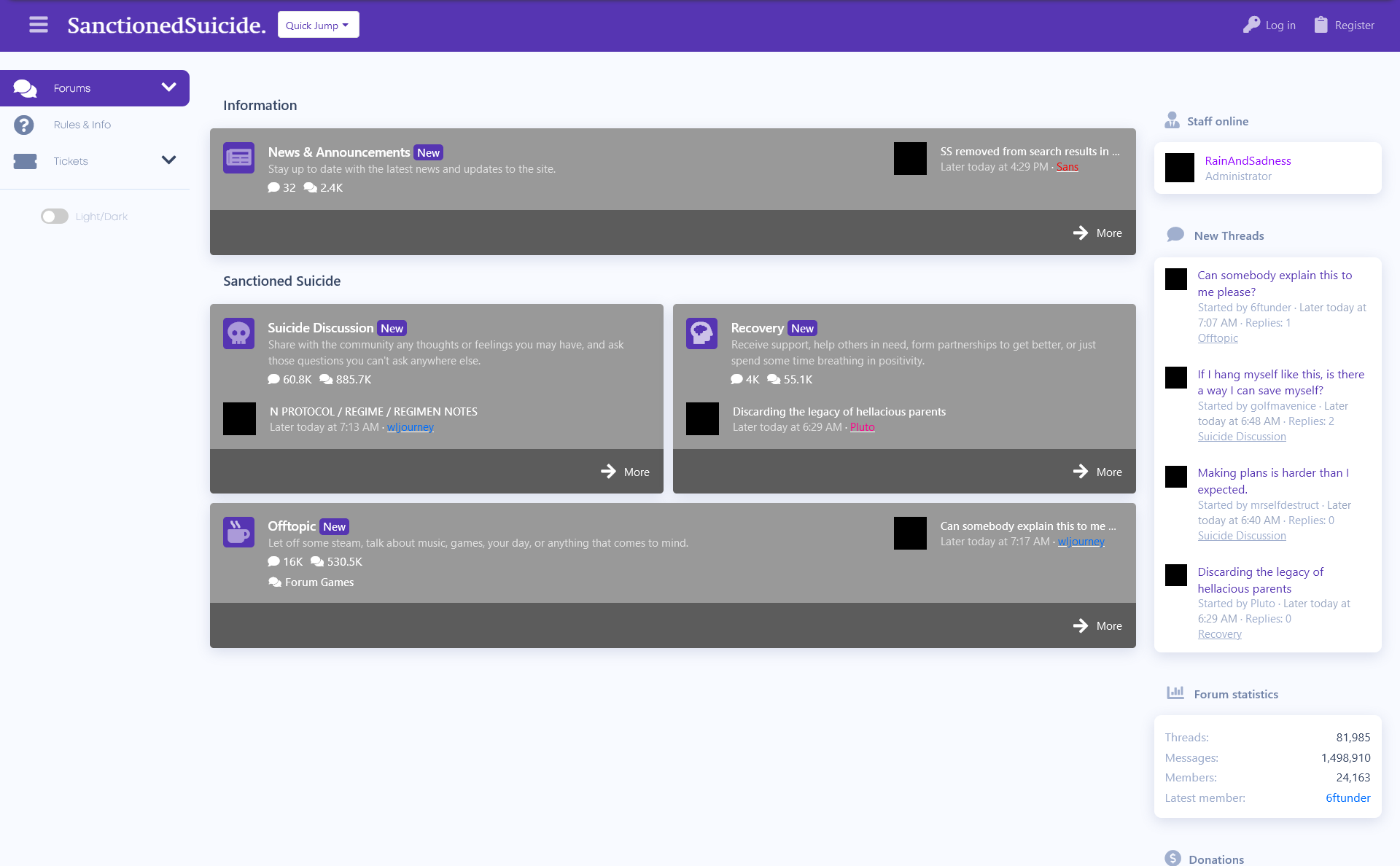
- Screenshot Screenshot of Sanctioned Suicide on May 11, 2022, with various scenes of nature greyed out
- Website type: Internet forum
- Available in: English
- Owner: RainAndSadness
- Founders: Diego Joaquín Galante; Lamarcus Small
- Website: https://sanctioned-suicide.net
- Registration: Optional (Note: While parts of the site can be viewed without an account, registration is required to post new threads, reply, react, message, use the search function and access the private subforum.)
- Users: 65,586
- Launched: March 18, 2018; 8 years ago

Sanctioned Suicide (SS, or SaSu) is an internet forum known for its open discussion and encouragement of suicide and suicide methods. The forum was founded on March 18, 2018, by Diego Joaquín Galante and Lamarcus Small, who go by the online pseudonyms Serge and Marquis. Galante and Small created the website after the subreddit r/SanctionedSuicide was banned by Reddit; both the website and the subreddit have been described as the successors to the Usenet newsgroup alt.suicide.holiday. As of November 2024, the forum has over 50,000 members and was reported to receive nearly 10 million page views in September 2023. Although the forum describes itself as a "pro-choice" suicide forum, it has been widely called "pro-suicide".

Sanctioned Suicide has generated widespread scrutiny from news outlets and government officials for the encouragement of suicide by members on the site, as well as the site's promotion of the use of sodium nitrite as a method of suicide, a previously obscure method. One New York Times report found 45 adults and children who died in connection to the site, and a later report found dozens more. At least 160 deaths are associated with the site in the United Kingdom. Access to the forum has been restricted in Italy and Germany. Since November 2023, Turkey also blocked access to the site.

== History and background ==
The r/SanctionedSuicide subreddit and Sanctioned Suicide have been described as the successors of the Usenet newsgroup alt.suicide.holiday. On March 14, 2018, r/SanctionedSuicide was banned for breaking Reddit's rules on the promotion of violence, prompting Galante and Small to create the site on March 18, 2018. In January 2021, Sanctioned Suicide's original .com domain name was banned by the domain name registrar Epik, allegedly for the presence of minors on the site. Following the ban, the site moved to a different domain name. In November 2025, the site again changed domain names.

=== The New York Times investigation ===
Journalists Megan Twohey and Gabriel Dance of The New York Times reportedly discovered the full names of the site founders during the October 2021 data breach of Epik. Following the breach, Twohey and Dance obtained photos of Galante and Small that matched previous appearances of their pseudonymous identities Serge and Marquis. When contacted by The New York Times, Small stated that he had no involvement with the website, suggested his brother may run the site, and denied his mother's name reportedly listed on police records. Galante acknowledged using the pseudonym Serge on the forum but denied founding or operating it, contradicting records on the site which described him as a co-founder and administrator of the website. After the two co-founders were named by The New York Times, Galante and Small announced their resignations as administrators, writing that they handed the forum over to a member going by the username RainAndSadness.

In an interview with the Poynter Institute, Twohey stated that the decision to name the website and the suicide methods promoted by the site were "two of the biggest ethical issues that we had ever dealt with". Following discussions with medical experts, law enforcement, and families, The New York Times team chose to name the website and the preservative once in the report, so as not to potentially raise the website's profile.

=== Galante and Small ===
Diego Joaquín Galante and Lamarcus Small describe themselves as incels and run a number of incel and manosphere related forums where members' discussions have been characterized as condoning, downplaying, or advocating violence against women. A September 2022 report from the Center for Countering Digital Hate described one of the forums as the largest forum dedicated to incel ideology. In response to a 2019 BuzzFeed News report which disclosed their connection to the incel forums, Small stated that the site's moderation was handled independently of the incel sites. Sanctioned Suicide has been noted as the only forum run by Galante and Small that does not restrict access by women. The New York Times investigation also reported that Small framed the site as part of a fight against censorship after the site received scrutiny for several deaths associated with the forum. An October 2023 BBC News investigation identified Small and confronted him at his home.

== Site overview ==
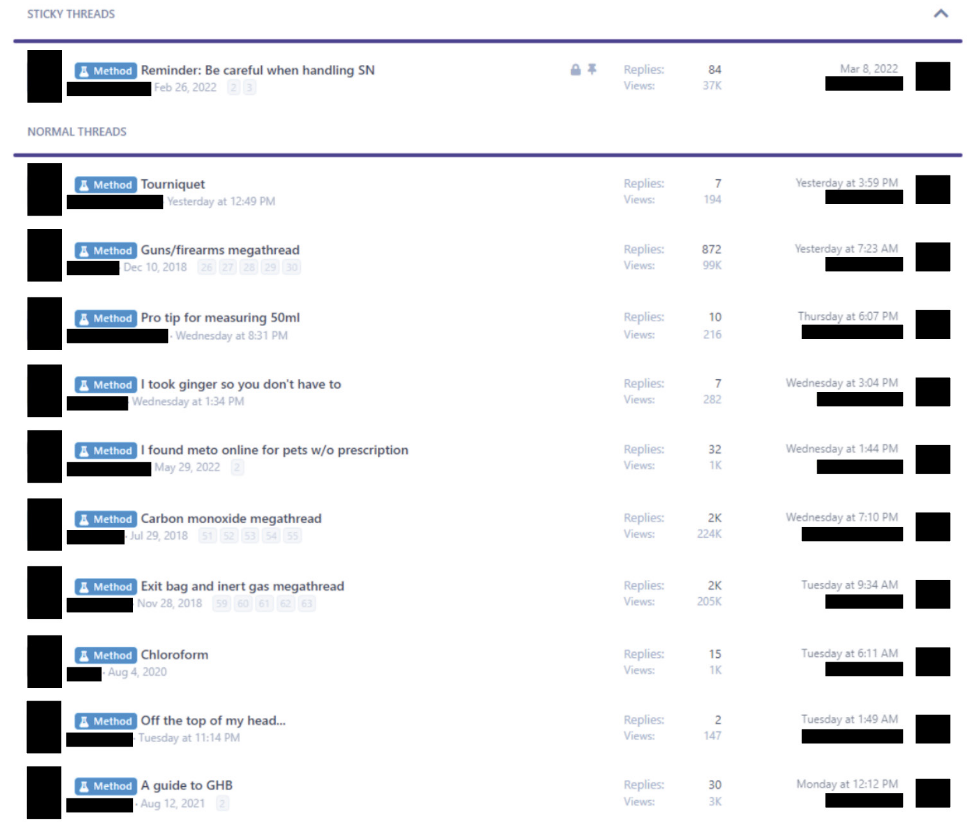
Screenshot of the Suicide Discussion forum

The site is divided into three forums: Recovery, Suicide Discussion, and Offtopic. The recovery forum hosts recovery-related support discussions, the suicide discussion forum hosts discussions on suicide methods, and the offtopic forum hosts discussions on hobbies and other general interests. The suicide discussion forum is substantially more popular than the other two forums, including both detailed discussions of suicide methods and encouragement to commit suicide, which users refer to by the euphemism "catching the bus". The site also hosts live chats and private messaging. As of November 2024, the forum has over 50,000 members and was reported to receive nearly 10 million page views in September 2023.

An April 2023 study published by the Association for Computing Machinery found that most new users were active only in the first few weeks after making their accounts and their first posts were more likely to be about suicide and methods. According to an informal survey conducted on the site, half of the forum's userbase were 25 or younger. The forum has been widely described as pro-suicide, although the site frames itself as "pro-choice" and denies that it actively encourages suicide. While the site includes links to suicide hotlines and other mental health resources, Small noted that registrants who only sought the recovery forum would be unlikely to be approved. An investigation by the Australian ABC News noted that members have responded to attempts to direct people to hotlines or other supports with antagonism and accusations of being "pro-life".

== Deaths ==
A December 2021 New York Times investigation identified 45 members who died by suicide in connection to the website, with a later report finding dozens more. At least 160 people have died in connection to the site in the United Kingdom. The New York Times investigation also identified more than 500 threads where users announced their suicide plans and did not continue to post. Among those identified by The New York Times was a 22-year-old woman from Glasgow who died by suicide after meeting Craig McInally on the site who had previously sexually assaulted and assisted in the suicides of several other women through the forum. In December 2022, he pled guilty to culpable and reckless conduct with a sexual element and is reportedly the first person in the UK convicted in connection to the site.

A PBS overview of the New York Times investigation specifically focuses on a male minor who was encouraged on the site to take his own life via the meat preservative sodium nitrite. His parents found him deceased on his bed. Prior to his death, the boy stated on the forum his worry about never recovering from an undiagnosed stomach ailment which was causing him pain after eating. While speaking about the boy, journalist Gabriel Dance stated "this Web site doesn't really help people with interventions, as much as it helps them carry out any kind of plans they have to kill themselves".

The New York Times also identified an Australian who died by suicide after members of Sanctioned Suicide taunted him and suggested he should film his death. An investigation by the Australian ABC News on the same death reported that his family believes the forum was the deciding factor in his death. Multiple parents of children who died by suicide after spending time on the site have publicly called on the forum to shut down, including a Facebook group with over 1,000 members. The moderators of the forum have since restricted the accounts of dead users to prevent family members or law enforcement from accessing them.

From 2020 until his arrest in 2023, Canadian Kenneth Law operated multiple businesses selling lethal products to suicidal people. Law was an active member of Sanctioned Suicide and promoted his online shops on the forum. CBC News estimates that Law's products led to the deaths of at least 147 people worldwide. Law plead guilty to 14 counts of aiding suicide in May 2026 as part of a plea deal.

== Response ==
=== Australia ===
In April 2019, the original .com domain name of Sanctioned Suicide was blocked by the Australian Federal Police under Section 313 of the Telecommunications Act 1997. Informal requests from the Australian eSafety commissioner Julie Inman Grant to Google and Microsoft Bing to delist the website from search results were declined, citing the need to balance safety with the open access of lawful information. Although both search engines have adjusted the site's ranking in its search results, the companies have stated that they will not delist the site absent a legal requirement. A November 2022 Australian ABC News investigation found that between 2017 and October 2020, there had been 20 suicide deaths from the meat preservative sodium nitrite in Australia, an increase from zero deaths across the previous 16 years. In response, the Australian Therapeutic Goods Administration reclassified the substance in 2022, further restricting its sale. Following the publication of the ABC investigation, which led some internet service providers (ISPs) to block the site, Sanctioned Suicide blocked access to the site in Australia, stating "anti-liberty countries will just be blocked".

=== United States ===
In December 2021, seven bipartisan members of the U.S. House of Representatives wrote to Attorney General Merrick Garland to clarify what action could be taken against the site under U.S. law. Following a statement from the House Committee on Energy and Commerce, Bing responded by lowering the ranking of the site in its search results; however, both Google and Bing declined requests to remove the site from search results absent a legal requirement. While many U.S. states have laws against assisting suicide, federal law provides immunity from liability for web operators for most user-generated content. April Foreman, a psychologist on the executive board of the American Association of Suicidology, argued that rather than block the site, better systems of support for people with suicidal ideation need to be created.

=== United Kingdom ===
Following the October 2023 BBC News investigation, several British ISPs, including Sky Broadband, TalkTalk, BT and Virgin Media, announced that the site would be blocked on default safety controls. In November 2023, after being contacted by the British digital regulatory agency Ofcom, administrators for the site partially restricted access to the site in the UK but lifted the block after a few days. Ofcom began an investigation into the site in March 2025—the first under expanded powers given to it by the Online Safety Act to take action against illegal sites. In July 2025, the site again restricted access to UK users citing legal risks, but advised users to bypass the block with a VPN. In November 2025, the site changed domain names and the site was available for a short period before being blocked again. Ofcom concluded their investigation in April 2026 and issued a ₤950,000 fine to the site for failing to restrict access to the site in the UK. The site did not pay the fine, and the regulator concluded that it was unable to take any further legal action against the site.

=== Other countries ===
In March 2020, the site was blocked from online search results in Germany. Prosecutors in Italy blocked access to the site in June 2021 following the deaths of two Italian teenagers by suicide. In response to The New York Times investigation, Uruguayan law enforcement launched an investigation against Galante, who resides in Uruguay. However, sources from the prosecutor's office stated that "it is very difficult to establish a crime" (Note: Spanish: "es muy difícil que haya un delito") since Uruguayan law requires personal involvement.

== See also ==
- Assisted suicide – Suicide undertaken with aid from another person
- Internet safety
- Philosophy of suicide – Philosophical aspects and arguments about suicide
- Right to die – Moral and legal concept
- Suicide and the Internet
- Suicide prevention – Efforts to reduce the risk of suicide
- Voluntary euthanasia – Practice of medically requesting another end one's own life to spare terminal suffering
