= The Girl from Plainville =

2022 American biographical crime drama television miniseries

- Genre: Biographical drama; Crime
- Created by: Liz Hannah & Patrick Macmanus
- Based on: The article by Jesse Barron
- Starring: Elle Fanning; Chloë Sevigny; Cara Buono; Kai Lennox; Colton Ryan; Norbert Leo Butz
- Music by: Leopold Ross; Nick Chuba
- Country of origin: United States
- Original language: English
- No. of episodes: 8

Production
- Executive producers: Liz Hannah; Patrick Macmanus; Elle Fanning; Brittany Kahan Ward; Lisa Cholodenko
- Producers: Neal Ahern; Russ Hammonds
- Cinematography: Frederick Elmes; Elisha Christian; Kat Westergaard
- Editors: Kate Hickey; Libby Cuenin; Ryan Denmark
- Running time: 40–49 minutes
- Production companies: Happy Friday Productions; Lewellen Pictures; Echo Lake Entertainment; Littleton Road Productions; Universal Content Productions

Original release
- Network: Hulu
- Release: March 29 – May 3, 2022

The Girl from Plainville is an American biographical crime drama television miniseries created by Liz Hannah and Patrick Macmanus. The series stars Elle Fanning, Chloë Sevigny, and Colton Ryan. It premiered on Hulu on March 29, 2022. A portion of the series showed at SXSW on March 12, 2022. The series is a dramatization of the events leading to the death of Conrad Roy and his girlfriend Michelle Carter's conviction for involuntary manslaughter. The series received mostly positive reviews, with praise towards the performances of Fanning, Ryan, and Sevigny.

== Premise ==
The Girl from Plainville explores the events in Massachusetts leading to the death of Conrad Roy by suicide in 2014 and his girlfriend Michelle Carter's conviction in 2017 for the involuntary manslaughter of him.

The narrative follows a non-linear structure with two parallel storylines, one concerning Conrad and Michelle's relationship from their initial meeting in Florida in 2012 up until his death, and one concerning the events following his death. Conrad and Michelle's text messages to each other are frequently re-enacted as if they were having a live conversation. There are also a number of fantasy sequences, told from Michelle's point of view.

== Cast and characters ==
=== Main ===
- Elle Fanning as Michelle Carter
- Chloë Sevigny as Lynn Roy
- Cara Buono as Gail Carter
- Kai Lennox as David Carter
- Colton Ryan as Conrad "Coco" Roy III
- Norbert Leo Butz as Conrad "Co" Roy II

=== Recurring ===
- Kelly AuCoin as Scott Gordon
- Scott William Winters as Eric Dawicki
- Kristin Griffith as Janice Roy
- Ella Rubin as Natalie Gibson
- Jeff Wahlberg as Rob Mahoney
- Kylie Liya Page as Cassie Wilkins
- Peter Gerety as Conrad Roy Sr.
- Chinasa Ogbuagu as Teresa Adams
- Aya Cash as Katie Rayburn
- Michael Mosley as Joseph Cataldo
- J. C. MacKenzie as Judge Moniz

=== Guest ===
- Pearl Amanda Dickson as Susie Pierce
- Guy Boyd as Dr. Peter Breggin
- Megan Lawless as Riley Anderson
- Ella Kennedy Davis as Sydney Roy, one of Coco's younger sisters

== Episodes ==
No.	Title	Directed by	Written by	Original release date
1	"Star-Crossed Lovers and Things Like That"	Lisa Cholodenko	Liz Hannah & Patrick Macmanus	March 29, 2022
2	"Turtle"	Zetna Fuentes	Ahmadu Garba	March 29, 2022
3	"Never Have I Ever"	Lisa Cholodenko	Ashley Michel Hoban	March 29, 2022
4	"Can't Fight This Feeling Anymore"	Pippa Bianco	Sara Pearson	April 5, 2022
5	"Mirrorball"	Pippa Bianco	Sarah Cho	April 12, 2022
6	"Talking Is Healing"	Liz Hannah	Bashir Gavriel	April 19, 2022
7	"Teenage Dirtbag"	Liz Hannah	Liz Hannah	April 26, 2022
8	"Blank Spaces"	Daniel Minahan	Liz Hannah & Patrick Macmanus	May 3, 2022

== Production ==
=== Development ===
On August 15, 2019, it was announced that Universal Content Productions was developing a television series inspired by the case, with documentarian Erin Lee Carr and journalist Jesse Barron serving as consulting producers. On August 7, 2020, it was reported that series was given a straight-to-series order and the series would be titled The Girl From Plainville which would be on Hulu. The series is created by Liz Hannah and Patrick Macmanus who are also expected to executive produce alongside Elle Fanning and Brittany Kahan Ward. Universal Content Productions, Echo Lake Entertainment, and Littleton Road Productions are the production companies involved with producing the series. On April 14, 2021, it was announced that Lisa Cholodenko is set to direct the first two episodes of the series. On September 2, 2021, it was reported that Hannah, Zetna Fuentes, and Pippa Bianco were added as directors for the limited series. The series was released on March 29, 2022.

The series was released on StarzPlay in the United Kingdom, Austria, Belgium, Denmark, Finland, France, Germany, Iceland, Ireland, Italy, Luxembourg, the Netherlands, Norway, Spain, Sweden, Switzerland, Japan, and Latin America, including Brazil and Mexico.

Filming for the series began on August 17, 2021, and concluded on December 10, 2021, in Savannah, Georgia.

=== Casting ===
Upon the series order announcement, it was reported that Elle Fanning was cast to star. On May 6, 2021, it was announced that Colton Ryan joined that cast on a starring role. In August 2021, it was reported that Chloë Sevigny, Norbert Leo Butz, Cara Buono, and Kai Lennox were cast as series regulars. On October 1, 2021, it was announced that Peter Gerety, Michael Mosley, Ella Kennedy Davis, Pearl Amanda Dickson, Kylie Liya Page, and Jeff Wahlberg joined the cast in recurring roles.

== Reception ==
=== Critical response ===
The Girl from Plainville received mostly positive reviews from critics. The review aggregator website Rotten Tomatoes reported a 93% approval rating based on 29 critic reviews, with an average rating of 7.2/10. The website's critics consensus reads, "Grounded by a disturbingly powerful performance by Elle Fanning, The Girl from Plainville dramatizes a sordid true story with tasteful restraint." On Metacritic, the limited series has a score of 76 out of 100, based on 18 reviews, indicating "generally favorable reviews".

Saloni Gajjar The A.V. Club gave the limited series a B− and said, "it succeeds in bringing a humane element to a puzzling crime without sensationalizing it. And for the most part, this is because of rousing performances by Fanning, Ryan, and Chloë Sevigny..."

Lucy Mangan of The Guardian gave the series three out of five stars, praising Fanning's and Sevigny's performances but criticizing the script: "...it doesn't feel as though there is enough depth, insight or value added here to justify the endeavour."

=== Awards and nominations ===
Year	Award	Category	Nominee	Result	Ref.
2022	Hollywood Critics Association TV Awards	Best Actress in a Streaming Limited or Anthology Series or Movie	Elle Fanning	Nominated	
2022	Hollywood Critics Association TV Awards	Best Supporting Actress in a Streaming Limited or Anthology Series or Movie	Chloë Sevigny	Nominated	
2022	Hollywood Critics Association TV Awards	Best Directing in a Streaming Limited or Anthology Series or Movie	Liz Hannah (for "Talking Is Healing")	Nominated	
2022	Hollywood Critics Association TV Awards	Best Writing in a Streaming Limited or Anthology Series or Movie	Liz Hannah and Patrick MacManus (for "Star-Crossed Lovers and Things Like That")	Nominated	
2022	Television Critics Association Awards	Outstanding Achievement in Movies, Miniseries and Specials	The Girl from Plainville	Nominated	
2023	Critics' Choice Television Awards	Best Limited Series	The Girl from Plainville	Nominated	
2023	Satellite Awards	Best Actress in a Miniseries, Limited Series, or Motion Picture Made for Television	Elle Fanning	Nominated	
