= Suicide of Gleb Korablyov =

2019 death of a student in Moscow, Russia

Gleb Korablyov
- Глеб Кораблёв
- Korablyov during a still from a live broadcast shortly before his suicide
- Born: Gleb Vyacheslavovich Korablyov; 13 September 2001
- Died: 17 October 2019 (aged 18); Moscow, Russia
- Cause of death: Suicide by gunshot wound to the head
- Burial place: Kotlyakovskoye Cemetery
- Education: Moscow Aviation Institute
- Occupation: Student

On 17 October 2019, Gleb Korablyov, an 18-year-old Russian student at Moscow Aviation Institute, fatally shot himself during a live broadcast on the social network VKontakte.

A video recording of the broadcast went viral after it was posted under the title "1444" on a YouTube channel titled GORE that same day; it spread widely online as a shock video and gained notoriety among Spanish-speaking users. The video remained on the platform for approximately three days (according to other reports, 16 hours) before moderators removed it. This video spawned derisive internet memes and an urban legend on social media, primarily because it is believed to be associated with a curse.

== Background ==
Gleb Vyacheslavovich Korablyov (Russian: Глеб Вячеславович Кораблёв; alternately rendered Korablev) was born on September 13, 2001; he attended Lyceum No. 654 in Moscow, and after graduating from the lyceum, he enrolled at Moscow Aviation Institute.

== Suicide and traction online ==
On 17 October 2019, Korablyov initiated a live stream on his VKontakte (VK) page while seated on a couch with a Saiga semi-automatic rifle. He spent the final moments of the broadcast addressing the camera, requesting that an acquaintance named Nikita delay notifying his parents. He concluded the broadcast by stating:

Как там говорится? А, точно. Ня, пока!

[How does the saying go? Oh, right. Nya, bye!]

Media analysts and investigators reported that the phrase "Ня, пока" ("nya, bye") was a replication of the final status update published by Ussuriysk student Renata Kambolina during her November 2015 suicide. Kambolina's post had inadvertently become romanticized on VK and was subsequently co-opted by administrators of the "Blue Whale Challenge" to develop the subculture's mythology, despite her suicide occurring prior to the emergence of the phenomenon and its associated "death groups," making any prior involvement a chronological impossibility. Investigations into Korablyov's death confirmed no direct involvement with a group coordinator, indicating he acted as a VK user influenced by the emergence of the subculture and the prior, unrelated romanticization of Kambolina's imagery.

Several sources claim that the original recording is two hours long, though the widely circulated clip showed only his final words and the act of suicide itself. It was reported that the video was originally uploaded to Facebook, downloaded from there, and then uploaded to YouTube. The video was posted under the title "1444" on the GORE YouTube channel and garnered over 151,000 views, remaining on the platform for about 3 days before moderators removed it and blocked the channel. Several versions of the video were uploaded to other YouTube channels and social media platforms under various titles, many of which included "video 1444" or "1444" in one of the versions to bypass removal filters. This avoids using words like "suicide" in the title or description, which prevented YouTube's moderators from detecting it immediately. According to another explanation for the video's title in a now-deleted Reddit thread, it was claimed that the original metadata for the video on a little-known Russian gore website — where it first appeared — contained the timestamp 14:44 in the file name.

On the same day, the video was posted on the Telegram channel and VK group "Bad News 18+." Later, other Russian Telegram channels also posted it. On October 20, 2019, the video gained further traction thanks to discussions on social media. Rumors circulated among Spanish-speaking internet users that the video had allegedly been "cursed by its original creator on the dark web," and that "the curse could be lifted from the viewer only by leaving a comment on the video with the date it was viewed". According to the "El Universal", a similar phenomenon occurred in the 2002 movie The Ring.

=== Possible reasons for suicide ===
The exact reason for his actions is unknown. The most commonly cited unofficial explanation is depression or a serious heart condition, which, according to some reports, was incurable.

== Aftermath ==
=== Urban legend and cursed status ===
The popular Spanish blogger TheGrefg commented on X (Formerly Twitter) about the release of this video.

This video has spawned numerous internet memes and an urban legend on social media, primarily because it is believed to be associated with a curse. According to rumors, the video compels viewers to take their own lives within 24 hours. Those who decide to watch it are given a special warning: if they watch the video, they will be cursed, which, it is claimed, can only be lifted by stating the date they watched it in the comments.

On 20 October 2019, the ReignBot channel, which focuses on online investigations, released a report on this video and its "cursed" status. As of October 2026, the video had garnered over 1.5 million views. On the same day, 20 October 2019, Argentine YouTube commentator and musician Magnus Mefisto also created a video about this video; as of November, 2019, his video had over 8 million views.

This viral phenomenon gained widespread attention in the Spanish-speaking segment of the internet and was covered by many YouTubers, including popular creators such as El Rincón de Giorgio and DrossRotzank. In his video, DrossRotzank summarized the information available at the time from forums and social media; according to him, the footage was filmed in Russia — a conclusion he drew based on the last words heard on the recording before the suicide, as well as the model of the weapon and the T-shirt worn by the individual. His video did not contain scenes from the viral livestream recording, but was nonetheless blocked by YouTube. Subsequently, DrossRotzank mocked and criticized the platform's owners in harsh terms, accusing YouTube of penalizing channels and removing videos for covering this story.

=== Opinions ===
American folklorist Trevor Blank, who studies the cycles of digital culture, classified the 1444 curse as a "secondary attachment" — a narrative of a curse that arises around already traumatic content as a way for viewers to collectively process the shock.

In a 2020 interview with the publication “Takie Dela” Russian artist and human rights activist Katrin Nenasheva, citing Korablev’s livestream as an example, referred to such videos as “reality” rather than “shock content.” She pointed out that suicide is a statistical, systemic problem that society is unwilling and unable to discuss.

=== Don't Google ===
Since early December 2019, the video has been a popular topic for "Don't Google" posts on TikTok, in which users were encouraged to search for the livestream recording online. According to Google Trends, search queries for the terms "video 1444" and "1444" peaked on October 19–20, 2019. In December, these search queries saw a sharp increase in popularity due to the spread of "Don't Google" posts on TikTok.

=== YouTube's response ===
After the video went viral, YouTube officially stated to several media outlets that the content violated the Community Guidelines regarding graphic violence and mutilation, and was therefore removed. The platform also imposed temporary restrictions on searches for "video 1444" — autocomplete and standard search became unavailable. Platform representatives encouraged users to refrain from circulating the video and from exposing others to its content. Nevertheless, copies of the video continued to appear on Reddit, 4chan, VKontakte, and the imageboard Dvach, where content moderation is slower or nonexistent.

This scenario mirrors earlier cases involving the removal of similar graphic material — the 2020 livestream of Ronnie McNutt's suicide and the 2007 "3 Guys 1 Hammer" video of a murder committed by the Dnepropetrovsk maniacs. Once a file has been copied across multiple platforms, its complete removal becomes virtually impossible; only the degree of searchability changes.

== See also ==
- Suicide in Russia
- Livestreamed suicide
