= Alt.suicide.holiday =

Usenet newsgroup

alt.suicide.holiday (a.s.h, ASH or ash) is a Usenet newsgroup. Its original purpose was to discuss the relationship between suicide rates and holiday seasons. However, it later evolved into a broad discussion forum where suicidal people could openly share their struggles or research suicide methods. Some participants are not suicidal, but instead post to provide psychological support or advice on how to kill oneself to suicidal or depressed posters. The newsgroup is unmoderated and is subject to occasional bouts of trolling and a harsh and sometimes hostile atmosphere. In mid-2002, the trolling heightened significantly and ended up driving away many regular users. According to its FAQ, its purpose is neither to encourage nor discourage suicide and it strongly maintains a pro-choice view on the matter.

== Effects ==
Research from 2007 shows that suicide websites could be more efficient in providing emotional help for people contemplating suicide than suicide hotlines. The primary reasons are the asynchronous nature of discussion in newsgroups giving enough time for thoughtful responses and group-based discussion that suicidal people find reassuring. The high degree of anonymity is another advantage of newsgroups like a.s.h, allowing people to openly talk about their feelings without fear of consequences.

In 2008, the UK Byron Review analyzed the effects of websites on children, and found that "research looking at pro-suicide sites has had mixed results. Some studies report high degrees of emotional and social support by these sites, particularly on sites where the methods of suicide were not discussed. More studies like this are needed to begin to understand the impact of such sites on those who spontaneously choose to access them."

== Coverage in the news ==
The newsgroup has been a target of news reports alleging a direct relationship between "avoidable" suicides and the suicide-facilitating nature of the newsgroup and website.

In 2003, a.s.h was the topic of a series of Wired articles under the pretext of examining the group's role in the deaths of several depressed individuals. The accuracy and integrity of the articles was widely disputed by ashers and internet media critics; e.g., Ken Hagler's Radio Weblog: No One Asked Why He Wanted to Die.

A.s.h played some role in the death of Suzy Gonzales, who killed herself in 2003 after sharing her thoughts on a.s.h. In the US, the death of Suzy Gonzales led to an attempt to introduce a controversial H.R. 940: Suzanne Gonzales Suicide Prevention Act of 2007, which did not pass. The current version of the bill is HR 1183: Suzanne Gonzales Suicide Prevention Act of 2011.

The community received further media attention due to the case of William Francis Melchert-Dinkel, who was charged by Rice County District Judge Thomas Neuville with encouraging the suicides of a person in Britain in 2005 and another person in Canada in 2008 through a.s.h.

== See also ==
- Sanctioned Suicide
- Seasonal effects on suicide rates
- Social media and suicide
- Suicide methods
