= Kenneth Law =

Canadian criminal (born 1965)

- Born: 1965 (age 60–61); British Hong Kong
- Other name: Greenberg
- Education: University of Toronto; University of Waterloo; York University
- Years active: 2020–2023
- Conviction: Aiding suicide (14 counts)

Details
- Victims: 14 (convicted), 93 (admitted), 147+ (suspected)

Kenneth M. Law (born 1965) is a Canadian man who sold lethal products to suicidal people from 2020 until his arrest in 2023. Law sold packages linked to 14 deaths in Ontario, 79 deaths in the UK, and more elsewhere. His products reached 41 countries and, according to a CBC News investigation, killed at least 147 worldwide. He also actively participated in forums promoting suicide and encouraged others to kill themselves with his product.

He was initially charged with two counts of assisting suicide, with charges expanded and upgraded to 14 counts of first-degree murder relating to deaths in Ontario. These charges were ultimately downgraded and Law pled guilty to 14 counts of assisting suicide in May 2026. When he is sentenced, deaths in the UK will be taken into account.

Law sold equipment used for suicide with accompanying instructions, and sodium nitrite, a food additive that is toxic in high concentrations.

== Early life and career ==
Kenneth M. Law was born in 1965 (Note: Law was both 57 and 58 in the calendar year of 2023.) and spent his early childhood in British Hong Kong before moving to Canada at the age of six. He has an industrial engineering degree from the University of Toronto, a master's degree in management science from the University of Waterloo, and a master's degree in business administration from York University. He claimed in a 2005 blog post to have worked in aerospace, finance and marketing. By 2009, he was either a managing director of an automotive company or a director at the Ontario Ministry of Agriculture.

In 2009, he was interviewed by Canadian Business. He was described as a former watch collector from Thornhill who invented a wheelchair device for his elderly mother. The device, called the escMode Wheel Accessory, makes stairs compatible with wheelchairs. He was looking into protecting the intellectual property and constructing a prototype model, estimating that it would cost C$100,000. He entered his design into the Great Canadian Innovation Competition and hoped that his invention would become ubiquitous worldwide.

Law told The Times that his mother suffered a stroke and was bed-ridden for seven years, relying on a feeding tube, and stated on a separate occasion that she died in 2010 after several more strokes. His religious father discouraged euthanasia. Law said that this inspired him to create an "avenue of escape" for people in similar circumstances, though The Times was unable to fact-check his story.

In 2016, wanting a "lifestyle change", he found employment as a cook at the Fairmont Royal York Hotel, where he was filmed partaking in a labour union turf dispute. Toronto Life reported that Law performed poorly, frequently argued with his coworkers and had few friends there. He once complained of age discrimination. The hotel's kitchen shut down early on in the COVID-19 pandemic in Canada, leaving Law unemployed. Owing over C$134,000, he filed for bankruptcy.

== Online businesses ==
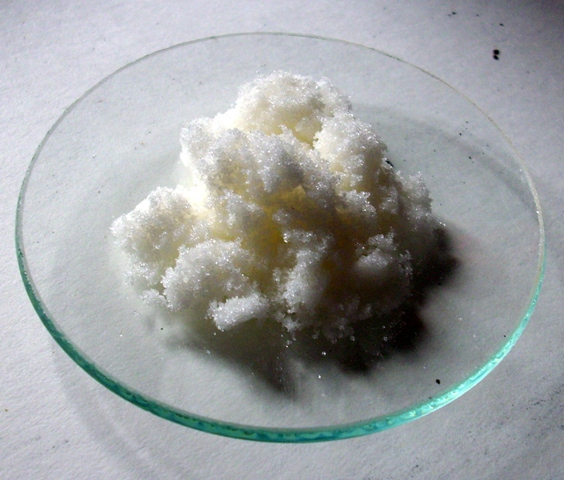
A sample of sodium nitrite

The chemical that Law sold, sodium nitrite, is often used as a food additive in concentrations of about 5%. It is toxic in high concentrations, and relatively unrestricted in Canada compared to other jurisdictions. Law sourced his 99.999% pure supply from China and stored it in his house. Exit International founder Philip Nitschke claims to have directly introduced Law to the substance at a workshop.

Law operated four companies that sold lethal products, including masks, hoods, pressure regulators, and sodium nitrite. He began selling pressure regulators in 2020 as a means to kill oneself, and expanded to sodium nitrite in 2021. Law's sites contained his real name and contact information, and used tracking numbers for products. Law disguised his sites as food-prep shops by offering other items such as hot sauce, and by posting a fried chicken recipe to a site.

Brand names associated with Law

- Imtime Cuisine
- AmbuCA
- Academic/ACademic
- Escape Mode/escMode
- ICemac

Law promoted his products on the website Sanctioned Suicide and wrote a pro-suicide blog under the name "Greenberg", claiming to be a retired doctor from New York. Under this alias, Law claimed to have once considered suicide, and wrote that people should not feel obliged to "drink the elixir of life to the last drop".

Law sent 1,209 packages to 41 countries through his companies, netting about C$297,000. Law claims that he only broke even. CBC News estimates that Law's products were used in at least 147 suicides worldwide, with victims as young as 14. His products have been used for suicide as late as 2026, after his apprehension.

=== Investigation and arrest ===
Kenneth Law's arrest
- Exclusive photo of Law being arrested in Mississauga obtained by Global News
- Law's arrest

Law sold sodium nitrite to British man Thomas Parfett, who died by suicide with the substance in 2021. In 2022, Parfett's father contacted investigative reporter James Beal of The Times after he made no progress with British police. Within months, Beal partnered with fellow journalist Will Roe to investigate an online suicide business which listed Law as its operator.

In a sting operation, Beal pretended to be suicidal and approached Law as a customer. On a recorded phone call, Law admitted to selling lethal products for the purposes of suicide. In an in-person follow-up meeting, Law vowed to continue selling his products and mocked the idea that he was in legal jeopardy. In April 2023, Beal published an article linking Law to seven specific deaths, sparking enormous media attention. Later, Law told The Globe and Mail that he had "no control" over what his customers did with sodium nitrite and was thus not criminally responsible.

The Peel Regional Police (PRP) had been probing a suspicious death involving sodium nitrite since March 31. On April 26, Beal emailed the force about the suicides, spurring it to urgently review cases of sodium nitrite poisoning. The PRP began intercepting Law's packages by April 27 and arrested him at his Mississauga residence on May 2. That month, 11 Ontario police agencies united to create a task force investigating Law's activities. Police agencies in the US, UK, Italy, Australia, and New Zealand also began investigating him, but he was only prosecuted in Ontario.

British prosecutors did not charge Law as they believed it would be difficult to extradite him. According to a National Crime Agency spokesperson, only the British investigation was thorough enough (compared to investigations in other countries) for its evidence to be included in Law's prosecution in Ontario. Families of Law's British victims expressed anger at the decision, as they had hoped to see Law tried in the UK.

== Legal proceedings ==
=== Criminal case ===
Law's criminal case unfolded in the Superior Court of Justice in Newmarket, Ontario. Legal experts describe the Law case as unprecedented in Canadian legal history; this was the first time Canadian prosecutors charged selling a legal substance as murder. Some legal experts compared this to the Jack Kevorkian case in the United States.

Law was initially charged with two counts of counselling or aiding suicide in relation to two Peel Region deaths. In August 2023, Law was charged with 12 more counts of counselling or aiding suicide for other Ontario deaths. He was additionally charged with 14 counts of second-degree murder in December, which were upgraded to first-degree murder the following month. In April 2025, Law lodged a complaint with the Human Rights Tribunal of Ontario alleging mistreatment and neglect in prison; he subsequently abandoned the complaint.

Law's trial was originally to take place during September and October 2025. In September 2024, the Crown requested that the Supreme Court of Canada rule on whether assisting suicide can be charged as murder after the Ontario Court of Appeals ruled, in an unrelated case, that only providing the means for suicide does not constitute murder. This appeal delayed Law's trial to January 2026, then April 2026. Ultimately, the Supreme Court left the Ontario Court of Appeals ruling standing, and declined to rule on whether assisting suicide can count as murder. This made it impossible to move forward with a murder prosecution. Multiple families of Law's victims expressed dismay at the decision to drop the murder charges.

On May 29, 2026, under a plea deal, Law pleaded guilty to 14 counts of assisting suicide and the Crown agreed to withdraw the murder charges. Law also admitted responsibility for 79 suicides in the UK. When he is sentenced, the British deaths will be taken into account. At a September sentencing hearing, 74 people gave victim impact statements. A second one is scheduled for November. Law could be sentenced as late as 2027.

=== Civil case ===
In September 2024, the family of Jeshennia Bedoya Lopez, an Ontario woman who died by suicide with Law's products, sued Law. They argued that Law had "[lured]" Lopez to her death when she was vulnerable, and also alleged that several of Lopez's health care providers did not provide her with adequate care. They sought a total of C$2 million in damages.

== Social impact ==
After Law's May 2023 arrest, Google Trends registered a spike in interest in sodium nitrite and sodium nitrate, presumably confused for the former, in Canada. A smaller spike in searches for these two terms occurred in August, when Law was additionally charged. Channel 4 commissioned a two-part documentary about Law, Poisoned: Killer in the Post, which aired in July 2025. The Passionate Eye also released a documentary in October 2026, The Poison Seller, which argues that law enforcement missed multiple opportunities to apprehend Law.

Law has been described as a "merchant of death" and serial killer by the press, though he maintains that his aims were humanitarian. A criminologist likened him to cult leaders and "angel of death" murderers. A relative of one of Law's British victims described Law as "one of the most prolific mass killers in British modern history".

The families of Law's victims have called for public inquiries. The British government rejected the idea in March 2026, as did Ontario that May. The federal government of Canada declined to comment on the proposal prior to Law's conviction.

== See also ==
- William Melchert-Dinkel, an American nurse who encouraged suicides online
