= Death of Conrad Roy =

2014 manslaughter in Fairhaven, Massachusetts, U.S.

- Conrad Roy

- Location of Fairhaven in Bristol County in Massachusetts
- Location: 41.64002°N 70.8883°W; Kmart parking lot in Fairhaven, Massachusetts, U.S.
- Date: July 12, 2014; 12 years ago
- Attack type: Coerced suicide, homicide, manslaughter
- Weapon: Carbon monoxide poisoning
- Victims: Conrad Henri Roy III, aged 18
- Perpetrator: Michelle Diana Carter
- Motive: Attention seeking (Carter)
- Verdict: Guilty
- Convictions: Involuntary manslaughter
- Sentence: 15 months in prison (paroled after 11 months) plus 15 months probation

Conrad Henri Roy III (September 12, 1995 – July 12, 2014) was an American marine salvage captain who died by suicide at age 18. His girlfriend, 17-year-old Michelle Carter, had encouraged him in text messages to commit suicide after he continuously expressed to her his deeply held desire to die.

The case was the subject of an investigation and involuntary manslaughter trial in Massachusetts, colloquially known as the "texting suicide case." It involved scores of text messages, emails, and phone calls recorded between Carter and Roy in the leadup to his death, in which Carter repeatedly texted Roy to kill himself. Roy had seen numerous mental health professionals and had been prescribed psychiatric medication.

After a bench trial, presiding judge Lawrence Moniz found Carter guilty of involuntary manslaughter, concluding that she wanted Roy dead and that her words coerced him to kill himself. Moniz's decision rested chiefly on Carter's final phone call in which she ordered a terrified Roy to go back inside his truck as it filled with carbon monoxide. Initially sentenced to 2½ years in prison, Carter had her penalty later reduced to 15 months, of which she served 11 months and 12 days. The case raised questions pertaining to the nature and limits of criminal responsibility.

== Roy's mental health and relationship with Carter ==
Conrad Roy was born on September 12, 1995, in Mattapoisett, Massachusetts. He worked with his father, grandfather, and uncle for several years in his family's marine salvage business, Tucker-Roy Marine Towing and Salvage, Inc., in the New England area.

In the spring of 2014, Roy earned his captain's license from the Northeast Maritime Institute by completing three months of night classes. In June 2014, he graduated on the Honor Roll (highest grades) from Old Rochester Regional High School (ORR) in Mattapoisett. Roy was a high school athlete who played baseball, rowed crew, and ran track. He graduated with a 3.88 GPA and was accepted to Fitchburg State University to study business, which he never attended.

Michelle Carter was born on August 11, 1996, in Massachusetts to Gail and David Carter. She went to King Philip Regional High School, in Wrentham. In 2014, Carter was prescribed citalopram, also known as Celexa, to treat anxiety and depression.

Carter and Roy met in Florida in 2012 while each had been visiting relatives. After this initial encounter, they saw each other in person again only a handful of times over the course of two years, despite having lived only about 35 miles (56 km) away from each other. Instead, they mostly exchanged text messages and emails.

According to court documents, Roy had allegedly been physically hit by his father and verbally abused by his grandfather. Roy attempted suicide in October 2012, after the divorce of his parents. After learning that he was planning to kill himself, Carter repeatedly discouraged Roy in 2012 and 2014, and encouraged him to "get professional help." However, her attitude changed in July 2014, when she started thinking that it would be a good thing "to help him die." In June, Roy texted Carter suggesting they act like Romeo and Juliet, which implied that they both agreed to killing themselves.

Roy struggled with social anxiety and depression for which he had seen several therapists and counselors, including a cognitive behavioral therapist in the weeks prior to his death. Roy had been hospitalized for an acetaminophen overdose at age 17; he was talking to a girl he had met in a group, and she called the police. Like Carter, Roy had also been taking the antidepressant citalopram. In the United States, citalopram carries a boxed warning stating it may increase suicidal thinking and behavior in those under age 24. In 2016, the judge had refused the defense's request for funds to hire an expert on Celexa, describing it as "speculative". Videos that Roy made of himself talking to a camera formed an important part of the case.

== Roy's death ==
On Saturday, July 12, 2014, following digital exchanges with Carter, Roy died by suicide by poisoning himself with carbon monoxide fumes in his truck in a Kmart parking lot in Fairhaven, Massachusetts. Roy's funeral was held a week later on July 19, at St. Anthony's Church in Mattapoisett. The Captain Conrad H. Roy III Scholarship Fund at the Northeast Maritime Institute in Fairhaven, Massachusetts, was established in his memory.

== Commonwealth v. Michelle Carter ==
Commonwealth v. Michelle Carter
- Court: New Bedford Juvenile Court
- Full case name: The Commonwealth of Massachusetts v. Michelle Diana Carter
- Submitted: February 4, 2015
- Decided: June 16, 2017
- Verdict: Guilty of involuntary manslaughter

Case history
- Subsequent action: Defendant was sentenced to 2½ years in prison (sentence later reduced to 15 months).

Case opinions
- Decision by: Lawrence Moniz

Michelle Carter was indicted on February 4, 2015, and arraigned the following day in New Bedford Juvenile Court in Taunton, Massachusetts, on charges of involuntary manslaughter. The grand jury found enough to charge her with "wantonly and recklessly" assisting the suicide. She was 17 at the time and the court indicted her as a "youthful offender" rather than a "juvenile," meaning she could be sentenced as an adult.

In June 2015, a district court judge denied a defense motion to remove the Bristol County District Attorney's office from the prosecution. The defense argued that DA Thomas M. Quinn III should be removed because he is first cousin to Roy's grandmother Janice Roy and therefore Conrad's first cousin twice removed. However, Quinn had already handed the case over to Deputy DA William McCauley.

On July 1, 2016, an appeal of the grand jury indictment, to the Massachusetts Supreme Judicial Court was also denied, allowing the case to go forward. Justice Robert J. Cordy, writing for the unanimous court, found there was probable cause to sustain the manslaughter indictment.

On June 5, 2017, the day before the trial was scheduled to begin, Carter waived her right to a jury trial. Therefore, the case was heard by Judge Lawrence Moniz in the Bristol County Juvenile Court of Massachusetts, in Taunton. Carter was represented by Joseph P. Cataldo and Cory Madera. As there was limited legal precedent for prosecuting the encouragement of suicide, Cataldo initially asked a Taunton Juvenile Court judge for summary dismissal, arguing that Carter's texts were protected under the First Amendment and that the text history showed that Roy had been contemplating suicide without Carter's input. The judge declined this motion.

On June 16, 2017, Moniz found Carter guilty of involuntary manslaughter. He stated prior to his ruling that it was Carter's phone calls with Roy when he was in his truck gassing himself (as described by Carter's texts to friends), rather than the preceding text messages, that caused him to go through with killing himself. Moniz found that Roy had broken the "chain of self-causation" towards his suicide when he exited the truck. Carter urged Roy to return to his truck, and it was her wanton and reckless encouragement that caused his death.

After the guilty verdict, Roy's father stated publicly that the family was pleased with the verdict but that they wanted privacy. Roy's mother, Lynn, appeared on the CBS 48 Hours show, saying she didn't believe Carter had a conscience and that she knew exactly what she was doing.

Carter remained free on bail pending her sentencing. On August 3, 2017, Moniz sentenced Carter to serve a two-and-a-half-year term, with 15 months to be served in the Bristol County House of Corrections, the balance of the term suspended, and five years of probation. Soon after the sentencing, Carter's lawyers asked Moniz to issue a stay of the sentence until all of Carter's Massachusetts court appeals were exhausted. Moniz granted the stay with condition that Carter avoid the Roy family.

On February 6, 2019, the Massachusetts Supreme Judicial Court ruled that Carter acted with criminal intent when she encouraged Roy's suicide, so her involuntary manslaughter conviction was upheld and Carter's 15-month prison sentence would be enforced. The rest of the 2½-year sentence was suspended, followed by five years of probation.

Under order from a Massachusetts judge, Carter began serving her sentence on February 11, 2019. Carter had a parole hearing for early release and her request was denied on September 20, 2019.

Carter's lawyers appealed the case to the Supreme Court of the United States in July 2019 based upon First Amendment and Fifth Amendment grounds. Carter's defense lawyers argued that Roy had a history of suicide attempts and the decision to end his life was his own, that Carter was "bewildered" over the case against her, and that, "taking all the texts in context, she tried to talk him out of it." They argued in initial hearings that the defendant had broken no law, had a First Amendment right to free speech, and was a juvenile. The Supreme Court declined to hear the case in January 2020, leaving in place her conviction.

On January 23, 2020, Carter was released from prison more than three months early due to good conduct. Massachusetts state law allows inmates to reduce their sentences by 10 days per month for exemplary behavior. Carter served 11 months and 12 days of her 15-month sentence.

== Legal repercussions ==
=== Possible effects ===
Some expected the case to set a legal precedent, regarding, as Ray Sanchez and Natisha Lance of CNN put it, "whether it's a crime to tell someone to commit suicide." Sanchez and Lance also stated that "The ruling [...] may spur lawmakers to codify the behavior highlighted in the case as criminal." The judge had noted that Carter had willed Roy's death, that she did not order him out of the truck and that her actions "put him in that toxic environment" which "constituted reckless conduct" and "that the conduct caused the death of Mr. Roy."

While U.S. law does not allow the lower-court decision to bind other courts, legal professionals believe it could have a social effect by raising other courts' attention to new, digital methods of committing crimes. The case also attempts to redefine the social spectrum in which attitudes and behaviors would qualify as criminal that were not considered criminal before.

=== Civil suit ===
In August 2017, Lynn Roy filed a $4.2 million wrongful death lawsuit for the death of her son against Carter, a suit which Lynn Roy's attorney later reported as "resolved" without comment, and which was dismissed "with prejudice and without costs." This docket record appearance is consistent with an out-of-court settlement. Settlement agreements often contain provisions that limit public comment by the parties.

== In media ==
On June 16, 2017, 48 Hours aired "Death by Text," an in-depth investigation of the events surrounding Roy's death.

On September 23, 2018, Lifetime released a telefilm titled Conrad & Michelle: If Words Could Kill which stars Austin P. McKenzie as Conrad Roy and Bella Thorne as Michelle Carter.

A Dateline NBC episode regarding the case, titled "Reckless," aired on NBC on February 8, 2019. In addition to covering the court proceedings of Carter's conviction, Dateline correspondent Andrea Canning interviewed both the prosecution and defense attorneys, along with Conrad Roy's family members.

On July 9, 2019, HBO released a two-part documentary on the case called I Love You, Now Die: The Commonwealth Vs. Michelle Carter, which explored the complicated relationship between Carter and Roy, drawing on some of the thousands of texts they exchanged over two years to chronicle their courtship and its tragic consequences. The film premiered at South by Southwest 2019, and was directed and produced by Erin Lee Carr. The same week as the documentary release, Carter's lawyers submitted a petition to the Supreme Court to consider her encouragement to commit suicide as protected free speech. Constitutional law scholar Eugene Volokh was reported as saying he did not expect the justices to take the case. The court declined to take up the case in January 2020.

On August 15, 2019, it was announced that Universal Cable Productions was developing a television series inspired by the case. On August 7, 2020, Variety reported that Elle Fanning would be starring as Michelle Carter and the series would be titled The Girl from Plainville which would be on Hulu. Fanning, Liz Hannah, Patrick Macmanus and Brittany Kahan Ward are executive producers of the series and Unbelievable director Lisa Cholodenko was announced to direct the first two episodes.

On May 7, 2021, the band SKYND, known for their true crime-inspired music, released a single titled "Michelle Carter" based on the events of the case. SKYND commented on the case to Wall of Sound, saying, "She could have helped him but instead she repeated herself over and over again telling Conrad to kill himself."

== See also ==
- Assisted suicide
- Complicity
- Social media and suicide
- Suicide of Amanda Todd
- Suicide of Megan Meier
- Suicide of Tyler Clementi
- Suicide pact
- The Girl from Plainville
- United States v. Drew
- Virtual crime
- William Francis Melchert-Dinkel
