= Suicide of Renata Kambolina =

2015 death of a student in Ussuriysk, Russia

Renata Kambolina
- Рената Камболина
- Kambolina's last photo before her death, 2015
- Born: December 18, 1998; Ussuriysk, Russia
- Died: November 23, 2015 (aged 16); Ussuriysk, Russia
- Cause of death: Suicide by impact with a train
- Burial place: Morskoye Kladbishche; Vladivostok, Russia
- Other name: Rina Palenkova (Рина Паленкова)
- Education: Far Eastern Technical College of Ussuriysk
- Occupation: Student
- Partner: Alexey Ekimov/Aleks Freedom (2015)
- Musical career
- Genre: Rock
- Instruments: Drums
- Years active: 2013–2015
- Formerly of: Needless

On November 23, 2015, Renata Kambolina, a 16-year-old Russian student from Ussuriysk, died by suicide. Her final social media post, shared under her pseudonym Rina Palenkova, inadvertently drew widespread attention on VKontakte only after unauthorized leaks of crime scene photographs surfaced on the platform, leading users to discover her profile once her death became known. In the period following the incident, public response was starkly divided. While some users expressed shock and empathy, others romanticised the tragedy by constructing a fabricated narrative that cast her as a virtual icon, while concurrently generating derisive internet memes that parodied her final post. This online distortion was followed by a series of emulative suicides and suicide attempts among platform users who mirrored her final words, visual photo framing, or both.

Kambolina's death occurred prior to the emergence of the centralized "Blue Whale Challenge" cyberbullying phenomenon and its associated 'death groups', meaning any prior involvement was a chronological impossibility. However, creators of these groups later retroactively weaponised her likeness and parting phrase to promote their online death groups as an internet cult. While initial media reports erroneously alleged that Kambolina had been a victim of these communities and the challenge itself, subsequent investigations confirmed she had no prior involvement with them, and that group creators had merely exploited her story to target vulnerable teenagers. This exploitation polarized the public response, which split between shock sites that mythologized the event and sympathetic online communities that created digital tributes intended to humanize her legacy. In response to the mythos, counter-movements like the "Pink Whale Challenge" emerged, repurposing her likeness into suicide prevention campaigns focused on mental wellness and internet safety.

== Background ==
Renata Igorevna Kambolina (Russian: Рената Игоревна Камболина) was born on December 18, 1998, in Ussuriysk. Described by peers as possessing a distinct creative personality, she initially attended Secondary School No. 13 in Ussuriysk. In 2015, after receiving a certificate of basic general education from School No. 28, she enrolled at the Far Eastern Technical College of Ussuriysk to specialize in computer networks.

Throughout her primary and secondary education, Kambolina developed an interest in alternative rock and youth subcultures, which influenced her fashion choices and online posts. Her personal profile on the social media network VKontakte (VK) featured a music playlist containing hundreds of tracks. Her selections included alternative rock, grunge, and heavy metal, with frequent tracks from artists such as Nirvana, Arctic Monkeys, The Beatles, Linkin Park, and System of a Down. To hide her real identity on these networks, she made an online pseudonym by combining a short version of her first name with a family name from her stepfather, creating the moniker 'Rina Palenkova' (Russian: Рина Паленкова). Under this name, she posted in alternative media groups, shared her drawings, and managed her page. This interest in music led her to learn percussion instruments. She enrolled in the "School of Rock Music" program in Ussuriysk during the 2013–2014 school year. Within this program, she started a local amateur rock band with a group of friends, serving as the band's drummer. The band members chose the name Needless as a nod to the Japanese science fiction manga and anime series created by Kami Imai. Following her passing, the remaining members briefly continued the project under different names, temporarily renaming it Black Nerves in 2017 before reverting to Needless in 2019, until the band officially disbanded later that year.

Kambolina was in a relationship with Alexey Ekimov, who was known on VK under the pseudonym Aleks Freedom. According to statements later provided to investigators and media outlets by her mother, as well as close acquaintances, the relationship was marked by periodic conflicts and personal disagreements that directly impacted her emotional well-being. In 2014, following a severe interpersonal dispute, Kambolina experienced a mental health crisis during which she walked to a local bridge in Vladivostok with the intention of jumping. She ultimately chose to step back from the ledge and safely left the scene, an event that investigators later noted as a significant prior indicator of her underlying psychological vulnerability. Despite this event, she remained in contact with Ekimov. Their subsequent break-up and final arguments in late 2015 were later cited by her mother and local investigators as the key personal factors contributing to the acute emotional distress she experienced in the days before her death.

== Suicide and traction online ==
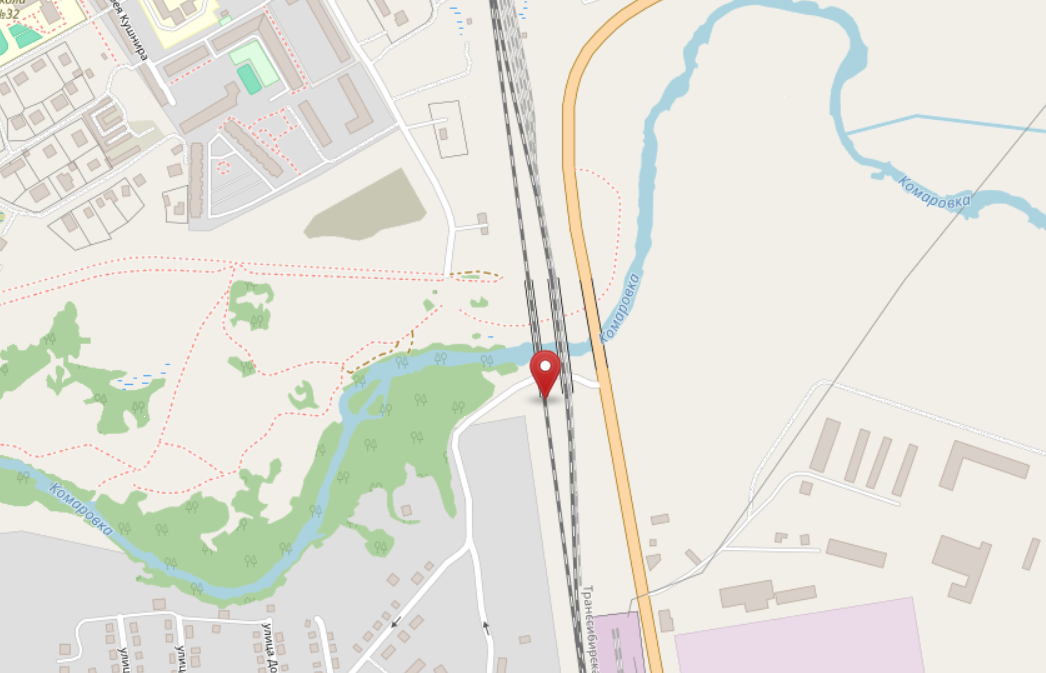
Location of Kambolina's suicide on the map

On November 23, 2015, at approximately 10:30 local time, Kambolina arrived at a railway crossing located at the 9179-kilometre mark of the Trans-Siberian Railway, at a site near the bridge over the Komarovka River and adjacent to the Sakhzavod station. As a freight train approached, she stepped onto the tracks. Upon sighting her, the train driver immediately engaged the emergency braking system; however, the momentum of the train prevented it from stopping in time to avoid the collision, resulting in her immediate death.

Kambolina's funeral took place on November 27, 2015, at a local funeral home in her hometown of Ussuriysk. The service was small, attended mostly by her family, classmates from her technical college, and friends from the local rock music school where she played drums. Her body was then taken to the Morskoye Kladbishche (Marine Cemetery) in the coastal city of Vladivostok for burial, where her grave sits on a hillside overlooking the sea.

On November 22, 2015, twenty-four hours prior to her suicide, Kambolina had uploaded photographic self-portraits to VK, accompanied by the caption 'ня.пока.' ('nya.bye.'). The post initially failed to attract public attention, inadvertently gaining widespread traction only after an unauthorized leak of crime scene photographs surfaced on VK, which prompted users to track down her profile page once news of her death broke.

Following this, the internal response on VK was starkly divided; some users expressed grief and shock, while other users generated derisive memes that parodied her final post. Anonymous platform users circulated hyperlinks to the personal profiles of Kambolina and her relatives, driving a localized wave of suicide romanticisation. This digital interest led individuals from multiple regions to contact her acquaintances, offering financial solicitation in exchange for unreleased personal photographs or private biographical details. This intrusion extended into physical spaces, with local residents visiting her gravesite to document video footage of the location.

== Investigation ==
The Investigative Committee of the Russian Federation initiated a criminal investigation into Kambolina's death. Following the initial inquiry, Kambolina's mother was charged under Article 110 of the Criminal Code of Russia for incitement to suicide. On May 21, 2016, the case files were transferred from Vladivostok to Moscow for additional review. According to the presiding investigator, federal authorities requested the criminal case for verification following significant public outcry surrounding the incident. In late 2016, the Investigative Committee closed the investigation into Kambolina's death, concluding that she had voluntarily died by suicide. According to statements by Kambolina's mother, the separate investigation regarding the unauthorized leak of crime scene photographs to VK was also closed. According to statements from Kambolina's acquaintances, interpersonal difficulties in her relationship with her boyfriend, Alexey, were cited as a potential contributing factor to the suicide.

Kambolina's mother subsequently filed a civil lawsuit against the Far Eastern Technical College, where her daughter had been enrolled, alleging that the institution failed to properly fulfill its duty of care. The plaintiff argued that the college neglected to inform parents regarding student truancy and that the teaching staff should have identified suicidal tendencies and notified the family. The Far Eastern Technical College contested the claim in court, asserting that evidence gathered during the criminal investigation indicated Kambolina was experiencing a chronic suicidal state. Representatives for the institution stated that Kambolina appeared calm and unconflicted during school hours, exhibiting no visible signs of distress to the faculty. Furthermore, the college argued that Kambolina navigated a strained relationship with her mother and was in a volatile relationship with her boyfriend, Alexei, noting that she did not discuss her familial situation with external parties. The defense added that while the college offered various extracurricular student activities, Kambolina had expressed no interest in participating and had been on medical leave since the initial days of the academic term. The court ultimately determined that the plaintiff's arguments were unfounded, including separate claims alleging that Russian Railways personnel, specifically a railway track controller, bore liability for failing to intervene or prevent the incident.

== Aftermath ==
=== Post-mortem internet culture ===
In the period following the incident, public response was starkly divided. While some users expressed shock and empathy, others romanticised the tragedy by constructing a fabricated narrative that cast her as a virtual icon, while concurrently generating derisive internet memes that parodied her final post. This online distortion was followed by a series of emulative suicides and suicide attempts among platform users who mirrored her final words, visual photo framing, or both. Media coverage later linked additional suicide cases to the emergence of online "death groups" following Kambolina's death, where her tragedy was discussed frequently amongst the members of those groups.

In May 2016, Russian journalist Galina Mursalieva published an investigative report on online "death groups" in the newspaper Novaya Gazeta. The article focused on specific communities on VK, such as "F57," and alleged that these groups had incited 130 teenagers to commit suicide. Kambolina's death occurred prior to the emergence of those groups, meaning any prior involvement was a chronological impossibility. While the report alleged that Kambolina had been a subscriber to an F57-affiliated group, subsequent investigations confirmed she had no involvement with the community prior to her death; instead, creators of these groups later retroactively weaponised her likeness and parting phrase to promote their online death groups as an internet cult, exploiting her tragedy to attract users seeking alternative 'truths' through self-harm. However, the report faced widespread criticism from independent journalists and experts for asserting a causal relationship without corroborating evidence. Subsequent official investigations concluded that none of the cited suicides were directly caused by the activities of these groups.

The administrators of these VK communities, including Phillip Budeikin and an individual operating under the pseudonym "Sea of Whales," subsequently developed an alternate reality internet phenomenon known as the "Blue Whale Challenge". The phenomenon was structured as a 50-day game where administrators assigned tasks to participants. These tasks escalated from relatively less harmful actions to mandatory acts of self-harm, culminating in an instruction to commit suicide. While the spread of these reports generated a severe moral panic across Russia, sensationalised media coverage frequently conflated the timeline. It was erroneously alleged that Kambolina was a victim of the Blue Whale Challenge; however, later investigations verified that she had no involvement with the game, and that its creators had merely weaponised her story for web traffic and promotional purposes.

In the years following the incident, public reaction to her death divided into distinct digital subcultures. While shock sites and predatory communities mythologized the event, sympathetic internet users across post-Soviet countries generated tribute media, including fan art and digital memorials, intended to humanize her legacy and detach her biographical memory from the mythos and the Blue Whale Challenge. Concurrently, mental health initiatives and counter-movements, such as the "Pink Whale Challenge", emerged online to repurpose her likeness into suicide prevention campaigns. These initiatives focus on positive mental wellness tasks and internet safety advocacy to mitigate the copycat effect among vulnerable youths.

=== Mother's response ===
Following the tragedy, Kambolina's mother granted multiple media interviews and participated in several television broadcasts. In a statement to REN TV, she addressed the factors underlying her daughter's posthumous online visibility. She attributed this public attention primarily to photographs captured at the scene of the incident that were subsequently disseminated across VK.

In the period following her loss, Kambolina's mother established a presence on various social networking platforms to coordinate with other bereaved parents, focusing efforts on identifying and exposing online groups linked to self-harm. She reported that internet users created numerous unauthorized pages utilizing her daughter's name and likeness, noting that individuals generated internet memes from her photographs to mock her memory. Kambolina's mother expressed an explicit desire to confront the online entities promoting content related to her daughter's death and requested a cessation of the exploitative use of her daughter's image.

=== Subsequent incidents ===
- In December 2015, just three weeks following Kambolina's death, 12-year-old Angelina Davydova and 16-year-old Diana Kuznetsova fell to their deaths in Ryazan as a result of their involvement with the Blue Whale subculture. They were the earliest copycat suicides of Kambolina directly linked to the subculture by investigators, marking the first recorded instances of this suicide contagion spreading through VK. Their families looked into their online history and found they were active members of 'Wake Me Up at 4:20,' an online group that grew to hold over a quarter of a million subscribers. Their digital trails showed a deep obsession with Kambolina, whose trackside selfie had recently gone viral across the platform. In their final posts, the two girls explicitly mimicked the final words originating from Kambolina, writing 'nya.bye' ('ня.пока.') to copy the exact sign-off circulating across VK. Alongside these photos and copied phrases, the girls left behind recurring drawings of butterflies and blue whales, symbols that users in these depressed online spaces had begun using to signal their involvement, which ultimately laid the foundation for the formalized Blue Whale Challenge
- In September 2016, a 15-year-old girl committed suicide in a village located within the Voronezh Oblast. Prior to the incident, she transmitted farewell messages to acquaintances utilizing Kambolina's phrase "nya.bye".
- In February 2017, the Blue Whale subculture received significant international media attention following the joint suicides of 15-year-old Yulia Konstantinova and 16-year-old Veronika Volkova, who fell to their deaths in Ust-Ilimsk, Siberia, after falling victim to the Blue Whale subculture. Unlike earlier hidden cases, their actions were broadcast publicly to their social media timelines, sparking widespread media attention. Konstantinova explicitly bypassed the mainstream community's generic deification of Kambolina, instead connecting with her personal traits, music preferences, and alternative fashion choices. Although she independently discovered that Kambolina was unconnected to the game, Konstantinova died in compliance with the final task, preventing her from publicly speaking out in defense of Kambolina's memory. This objective was later undertaken by mental health advocates affiliated with the "Pink Whale Challenge" counter-movement, including a surviving Blue Whale subculture victim who shared Konstantinova's connection to Kambolina's traits and joined this supportive initiative. To signal her final countdown task to her online handlers, Konstantinova utilizsed Kambolina's phrase ("ня.пока.") across her profile page right before uploading a graphic of a blue whale alongside the word "End," while Volkova posted a matching message reading "Sense is lost… End." Subsequent data analysis of their recovered electronic devices confirmed extensive communication logs with Russian network administrators, leading directly to emergency legislative acts banning Blue Whale communities across Eastern Europe.
- In May 2017, a 16-year-old girl from Atlanta, Georgia, died by suicide after falling victim to the Blue Whale subculture, which manipulated her into mirroring Kambolina's imagery. She sketched Kambolina's trackside face and carefully traced out her Cyrillic nickname, beneath it. Because she could not read Russian, she copied the text directly from the photograph pushed by online handlers, unaware that Kambolina was a real person unconnected to the challenge. Her brother discovered this artwork alongside photographs documenting her participation in the online tasks, including a photo of her dangled legs fulfilling a rooftop milestone, and a final home post of train tracks captioned "goodbye". This final message referenced Kambolina's passing, but used the English word "goodbye" rather than the literal translation "nya. bye." Following her death, her brother used her diary to trace the Cyrillic text online, uncovering Kambolina's independent history and learning how her private tragedy had been co-opted. American investigators concluded that while a centralized Russian network was not actively targeting Western youth, online actors were intentionally copying the blueprint. Her brother subsequently spoke out publicly to warn families about how the subculture weaponised Kambolina's memory to lure vulnerable youth into the challenge.
- On May 12, 2019, a young man died by suicide in Moldova. Subsequent investigations revealed that on May 10, two days prior to his death, he had purchased a bus ticket from Chișinău. On the following day, he transmitted a photograph of his location to his sister and published multiple farewell messages online, one of which utilized Kambolina's phrase "nya.bye".
- On October 17, 2019, 18-year-old Moscow student Gleb Korablyov died by suicide by shooting himself during a live stream on his VK page that subsequently circulated online under the title '1444'. Sitting on a couch with a semi-automatic shotgun carbine, Korablyov concluded the broadcast by stating, 'Как там говорится? О, точно. Ня, пока!', which translates to 'How does the saying go? Oh, exactly. Nya, bye!', right before the fatal act. a replication of Kambolina's final status update. Investigations into Korablyov's death confirmed no direct involvement with a Blue Whale 'death group' coordinator, indicating he acted as a VK user influenced by the emergence of the subculture and the prior, unrelated romanticization of Kambolina's imagery.
- On November 2, 2023, two girls died by suicide in Volgograd at a residential building. Immediately prior to the incident, they conducted a live video stream and took multiple photographs; one of these images was uploaded utilizing Kambolina's phrase "nya.bye", but with the addition of an exclamation mark, similar to Korablyov.
- On April 14, 2025, a 19-year-old man died by suicide in the city of Lesnoy. Before the incident, he published a final message referencing the "nya.bye" phrase from Kambolina's original post, explicitly stating that he intended the reference as a tribute to that specific post.

== See also ==
- Suicide in Russia
