= Johan Robeck =

Swedish-German Catholic philosopher known for his theological defence of suicide

Johan Robeck (Note: Robeck's first name may be variously spelled as "Johann," "Jean," "Johannis," or "Johannes.") (1672–1735) (Note: Robeck's date of death is variously reported as 1729, 1735, or 1739.) was a Swedish-German Catholic theologian and philosopher who wrote an essay in defense of suicide, and later drowned himself in the river Weser.

== Life ==
Robeck was born in Kalmar, Sweden, and raised in the reformed religion. He studied in Uppsala, before going to Hildesheim in Germany, where he converted to Catholicism in 1704. He joined the Jesuits and lived in Rinteln, Westphalia.

He wrote an essay justifying suicide from a theological point of view, titled Exercitatio philosophica de morte voluntaria (A philosophical exercise concerning voluntary death), (Note: Exercitatio philosophica de εύλόγῳ ἐξαγωγῇ sive morte voluntaria philosophorum et bonorum virorum, etiam Judaeorum et Christianorum.) which was published posthumously (Marburg, 1736) by Johann Nicolaus Funck. His book started a debate among Europeans of his time, which included Rousseau and Voltaire, especially after he himself committed suicide by drowning in the river Weser near Bremen, Germany.

According to Robeck's argument, anyone may destroy a gift, the giver having given up any rights in it; therefore, as life is a gift from God, suicide cannot offend against God.

== In Voltaire's Candide ==
Robeck's suicide is referenced in the old woman's story at the end of chapter XII in Voltaire's 1759 novel Candide: "...I have met only twelve who have voluntarily put an end to their misery — three negroes, four Englishmen, four Swiss, and a German professor called Robeck."

== Sources ==
- Timothy J. Demy, Gary Stewart (1998). Suicide: a Christian response : crucial considerations for choosing life. Kregel Publications. ISBN 0-8254-2355-4.
- Róisín Healy (2006). "Suicide in Early Modern and Modern Europe". The Historical Journal. 49 (3). Cambridge University Press; National University of Ireland, Galway: 903–919. doi:10.1017/S0018246X06005577. hdl:10379/4115. S2CID 27734440.
