= Katrin Nenasheva =

Russian contemporary artist and activist

- Екатерина Ненашева
- Born: 11 May 1994; Krasnodar, Russia
- Education: Maxim Gorky Literature Institute
- Known for: Social and human rights activist

Katrin Nenasheva (Russian: Екатерина Алексеевна Ненашева; born 11 May 1994 in Krasnodar) is a contemporary Russian artist, art activist, director, human rights activist, and representative of Moscow actionism. She is known for her multi-day performances on pressing social issues.

== Biography ==
She was born in Krasnodar, Krasnodar Krai. In 2017, she graduated from the Maxim Gorky Literature Institute (poetry seminar), and that same year, completed the "Contemporary Art" course at the Free Workshops School of Contemporary Art at the Moscow Museum of Modern Art.

In her works, she explores the boundaries between art and everyday life, modern communications, and the life of closed communities. Nenasheva's actions are embedded in the urban environment and have a long duration (21 days, 23 days, 30 days).

Among her major works are Don't Be Afraid (2015)), "Punishment" (2016), Between Here and There (2017) Archived December 29, 2019 (action and closed screenings based on a banned exhibition, 2018).

Initiator of the traveling anti-war exhibition series "NOT PEACE" (2015–2016), which took place in Russia, Belarus, Lithuania, and Ukraine.

She was a participant in the activist art festival "MediaUdar. Moscow" (2015 and 2016).

Since October 2016, Katrin has been implementing a long-term project, "Between Here and There", aimed at destigmatizing people with mental disabilities in the public consciousness and establishing communication between inmates in psychiatric institutions and the outside world.

Nenasheva has been detained repeatedly during protests. For example, during her most recent "Between Here and There" protest in 2017, the artist was detained on Red Square by police officers with the statement, "Under no circumstances should you be in a public place in virtual reality. This is the real world". She was taken to the nearest police station, after which she was taken for examination to a psychiatric hospital.

In 2018, Nenasheva and a friend were tortured in the Donetsk People's Republic by police and military personnel.
