= William Melchert-Dinkel =

American nurse and criminal (born 1962)

William Francis Melchert-Dinkel
- Born: William Francis Dinkel; July 20, 1962 (age 64)
- Other names: "Li Dao"; "Cami D"; "Falcongirl"
- Occupations: Nurse; Truck driver
- Status: Released
- Motive: Sexual fetishism
- Convictions: Assisting suicide, attempted assisting suicide
- Criminal charge: Assisting suicide (2 counts)
- Penalty: 178 days imprisonment, 10 years probation

Details
- Victims: Confirmed: Nadia Kajouji, aged 18; Mark Drybrough, aged 32
- Date: July 27, 2005 (Drybrough); March 9, 2008 (Kajouji)
- Span of crimes: 2005–2010
- Location: Worldwide
- Target: People suffering with depression
- Killed: ≥5 (self-claimed); 2 (convicted)
- Date apprehended: April 23, 2010

William Francis Melchert-Dinkel (born July 20, 1962) is an American former licensed practical nurse who was convicted in 2011 of convincing people online to die by suicide. He told those contemplating suicide what methods worked best, that it was an acceptable choice to take their own life, that they would be better off in heaven, and/or falsely entered into suicide pacts with them. Melchert-Dinkel is a married father of two.

Melchert-Dinkel was originally convicted of two counts of assisting suicide for encouraging the July 27, 2005, suicide of 32-year-old Mark Drybrough, a British IT technician, and the March 9, 2008, suicide of 18-year-old Nadia Kajouji, a Canadian college student, via Internet chat rooms. Those convictions were later overturned by the Minnesota Supreme Court when it found that part of the state law used to convict him was unconstitutional. On remand, Melchert-Dinkel was convicted on one count of assisting suicide, and one count of attempted assisting suicide. He served 178 days in jail and was on probation for 10 years.

== Early life ==
William Dinkel graduated from East High School in Duluth, Minnesota in 1980, later graduated from Wadena Technical Institute and, in 1989, married Joyce Melchert.

== Crimes ==
William Francis Melchert-Dinkel allegedly met his victims in Internet suicide chat rooms, where he posed as a depressed woman in her 20s using aliases such as "Li Dao", "Cami D" or "falcongirl". According to his affidavit, Melchert-Dinkel spoke to dozens of people over the course of four or five years, encouraging them to kill themselves, typically by hanging. He said he was successful in at least five instances.

=== Mark Drybrough; England ===
Melchert-Dinkel was convicted in relation to the suicide of Mark Drybrough, a 32-year-old British IT technician who, in the wake of suffering from a nervous breakdown and depression, hanged himself in his home in Coventry, Warwickshire, England, in July 2005. He had been chatting for two months with someone using the aliases Falcongirl and Li Dao. Melchert-Dinkel was charged with counseling Drybrough on how to kill himself.

=== Nadia Kajouji; Canada ===
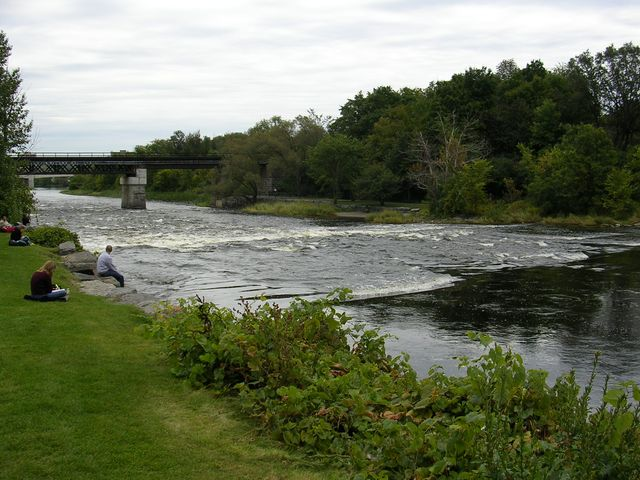
The Rideau River, opposite Carleton University.

Melchert-Dinkel was also convicted in relation to the suicide of 18-year-old Nadia Kajouji, who became depressed after leaving home to begin studies at Carleton University in Ottawa, Ontario, Canada. She jumped from a bridge and was found drowned in the Rideau River in April 2008. Kajouji had conversed online with someone posing as a young woman–now known to be Melchert-Dinkel–who suggested that she hang herself, gave her detailed instructions how to do it, and told her to capture her final moments with a webcam so (s)he and others could watch as part of a joint suicide pact. Police in St. Paul, Minnesota, said they confirmed that she "had been conversing with Melchert-Dinkel online just prior to her disappearance", including on the day of her suicide.

== Investigations ==
In November 2006, Celia Blay, a retired British schoolteacher living in Maiden Bradley, Wiltshire, England received word from a teenaged friend in South America that she had entered a suicide pact with a young nurse. Blay investigated Melchert-Dinkel's "Li Dao" identity, and discovered that he had previously agreed to earlier suicide pacts. She successfully convinced the girl to break the pact four hours before the planned suicide. Throughout the following year, Blay posted warnings about "Li Dao" on other chat websites. She also discovered Melchert-Dinkel's "Falcongirl" and "Cami D" identities, and talked to users who entered other pacts in which he arranged to have attempted victims die in front of their webcams. After months of collecting evidence about Melchert-Dinkel's activities, Blay approached the local police. They opted not to investigate.

In January 2008—around the time Melchert-Dinkel was corresponding with Kajouji—Blay and a friend, Kat Lowe, set up a sting to catch "Cami D" in the act of attempting a suicide pact. It was during this correspondence that Melchert-Dinkel described seeing a man from Birmingham, thought to be Drybrough, hang himself on his webcam. Lowe and Blay gained Melchert-Dinkel's trust and found information that traced him back to his IP address and residence in Minnesota. In a stroke of luck, they also saw Melchert-Dinkel through a webcam feed, posing as "Cami D". Blay submitted an affidavit on the matter to the Federal Bureau of Investigation, but received no response. However, the Saint Paul Police Department and the Minnesota Internet Crimes Against Children Task Force agreed to take the case.

== Charges ==
Melchert-Dinkel was convicted on March 15, 2011, in a criminal complaint filed in Rice County, Minnesota. He was charged with advising, encouraging, or assisting Kajouji and Drybrough in taking their own lives using Internet correspondence. He was ordered to not use the Internet while the case was underway.

While encouraging suicide is illegal, laws in North America and Britain had not previously been successfully used to prosecute anyone for promoting suicide over the Internet. He was found guilty of aiding a suicide under Minnesota law, which provides penalties for anyone who "intentionally advises, encourages, or assists another in taking the other's own life"; punishment can be up to 15 years in prison and a fine of up to $30,000. He was sentenced on May 4, 2011, to 360 days in jail.

On July 27, 2012, the Minnesota Court of Appeals affirmed the conviction. The Minnesota Supreme Court subsequently agreed to review the case. On March 19, 2014, the supreme court reversed the conviction and remanded the case back to Rice County District Court. The court held that merely advising or encouraging suicide was protected speech under the First Amendment to the United States Constitution. It went on to hold, however, that speech which actually assisted a suicide was not protected.

=== Retrial and second conviction ===
Since the trial court made factual findings only with respect to encouraging and advising, the supreme court reversed the conviction. It remanded the case, however, for the lower court to determine whether Melchert-Dinkel had actually assisted the suicides within the meaning of the statute. In the case of Nadia Kajouji, Melchert-Dinkel was charged with attempting to assist a suicide because Kajouji ultimately died by jumping off a bridge into a frozen river, rather than by hanging, as Melchert-Dinkel had allegedly suggested to her online.

Melchert-Dinkel was convicted of assisting the suicide of Mark Drybrough and attempting to assist the suicide of Nadia Kajouji. Rice County District Judge Thomas Neuville sentenced William Melchert-Dinkel to 3 years in prison, but suspended that sentence if Melchert-Dinkel serves 360 days in jail and abides by the terms of his probation for 10 years after his release. During his second sentencing hearing, Melchert-Dinkel stated, "I am sorry... for my actions and what I have done. I have repented."

Melchert-Dinkel was released in 2015 after serving 178 days in jail. Even after his release from prison in February 2015, his lawyer continued to appeal the conviction.
