= List of livestreamed suicides =

Livestreamed suicide is an internet phenomenon where an individual broadcasts their suicide in real time via social media or video platforms.

== List ==
=== 2007 ===
- March 21st — A 42-year-old man from Telford, England, Kevin Whitrick, committed suicide live in front of a webcam while in an online insult chatroom on Paltalk.

=== 2008 ===
- November 19th — 19-year-old Abraham Biggs took a lethal dose of drugs during a livestream on Justin.tv (now named Twitch) in Pembroke Pines, Florida, United States. Prior to the suicide, Biggs had announced his plans to end his life on the bodybuilding.com forums.

=== 2010 ===
- October 11th — A 21-year-old autistic man, Marcus Jannes, hanged himself in his apartment during a livestream in Sweden.
- November 9th — A 24-year-old man livestreamed his own hanging on Ustream in Sendai, Miyagi, Japan.

=== 2012 ===
- June 28th — Michael Marin, a 53-year-old lawyer, ate cyanide in court. Prior to his suicide, he was convicted of arson.

=== 2013 ===
- November 24th — A 14-year-old Japanese junior high school student, under the pseudonym Rorochan_1999 (Japanese: ろろちゃん), jumped from the 13th floor in Ōmihachiman, Shiga Prefecture, Japan, whilst live on FC2. She had previously stated her intent, on 2chan, that she "want[ed] to do a suicide stream."

=== 2016 ===
- May 10th — A 19-year-old who called herself Océane, threw herself under a train in Égly, France, during a Periscope livestream. During the stream, she said that she had been raped and abused by a former boyfriend before jumping in front of a suburban train at around 4:00 p.m.
- September 6th — A 30-year-old man, Charoen Chimphuk, committed suicide by hanging during a Facebook livestream in Bangkok, Thailand.
- October 10th — A 22-year-old Turkish man, Erdoğan Ceren, fatally shot himself in the stomach on a Facebook livestream in Osmaniye, Türkiye. Before his suicide, he addressed to viewers that his girlfriend had broken up with him.
- October 26th — 22-year-old Roengkhetkan Saharat fatally shot himself in the head on a Facebook livestream in Kamphaeng Phet, Thailand. Before the livestream, he faced a large amount of debt due to his gambling.
- December 30th — 12-year-old Katelyn Nicole Davis died by suicide during a livestream on Live.me (now stylized as LiveMe.com) in Cedartown, Georgia, United States. In a 40-minute live broadcast, the girl said that she had been sexually abused by a family member.

=== 2017 ===
- January 22nd — A 14-year-old girl, Nakia Venant, committed suicide by hanging on a Facebook livestream in Miami Gardens, Florida, United States.
- January 23rd — A 33-year-old actor, Frederick Jay Bowdy, fatally shot himself in a car while on a Facebook live in North Hollywood, Los Angeles, California. A few days before his suicide, he was arrested for sexual assault.
- April 25th — A 49-year-old man, James M. Jeffrey, fatally shot himself in the head during a Facebook livestream in Robertsdale, Alabama, United States. Prior to his suicide, he had been going through a breakup with his girlfriend.
- May 13th — A 33-year-old musician and audio engineer, Jared McLemore, died after intentionally setting himself on fire in a parking lot and running into a bar on a Facebook livestream in Memphis, Tennessee, United States.
- December 25th — A 39-year-old man, Gregory Tomkins, committed suicide on a webcam while logged onto an insult chatroom on Paltalk in Wallington, London.

=== 2018 ===
- March 14th — An 18-year-old, Shuaib Naz "Shuaiby" Aslam, fatally shot himself in the head with a shotgun while live on YouTube and Discord with his friends. Prior to his suicide, he had been going through depression.
- July 1st — A 16-year-old Japanese high school student, who went under the pseudonym Nakaikiaka (Japanese: なかいきあか), jumped onto the train tracks on a TwitCasting livestream at Kintetsu-Kōriyama Station, Yamatokōriyama, Nara Prefecture, Japan. She had previously expressed her sadness at her boyfriend forcing her to take birth control pills after her becoming pregnant.
- July 25th — A 43-year-old builder from Cardiff, Wales named Leon Jenkins livestreamed his suicide by hanging while in an online insult chatroom on Paltalk.

=== 2019 ===
- January 16th — 41-year-old Brian Velasco, the drummer for the Filipino rock band Razorback, died after jumping from the balcony of a condominium in Malate, Manila on a Facebook livestream. His girlfriend later stated that he had bipolar disorder and was under treatment for it.
- October 17th — An 18-year-old Moscow student, Gleb Korablyov, died by suicide by shooting himself during a live stream on his VKontakte page that subsequently circulated online under the title '1444'. Sitting on a couch with a semi-automatic shotgun carbine, Korablyov spent the final moments of the broadcast addressing the camera, requesting that an acquaintance named Nikita not notify his parents right away. He concluded the broadcast by stating, 'Как там говорится? О, точно. Ня, пока!', which translates to 'How does the saying go? Oh, exactly. Nya, bye!', right before the fatal act. Media analysts and investigators noted that this phrase was a direct verbal replication of the viral sign-off text published by Ussuriysk student Renata Kambolina a day before her own suicide in November 2015. Two and a half hours later, police officers arrived at the apartment and turned off the camera. The video was uploaded to YouTube on the 19th of October under the title "Video 1444", and stayed up for three days before being taken down. At the time of its takedown, it had ~150,000 views. The video was then subsequently reuploaded to various social media platforms, bearing the "1444" name, throughout late 2019.

=== 2020 ===
- August 31st — A 33-year-old US Army Reserve veteran, Ronald Merle McNutt, fatally shot himself in the chin with a rifle during a Facebook livestream in New Albany, Mississippi. Prior to his suicide, he had been struggling with P.T.S.D, depression, and a breakup with his girlfriend. After a brief argument with his girlfriend over the phone, McNutt looked to the camera and said: "Hey guys, I guess that's it", before shooting himself in the chin. McNutt’s death is widely considered to be one of the most famous examples of live-streamed suicide, with it becoming international news as the graphic video spread across the internet, often being hidden within innocuous content for shock value.

=== 2021 ===
- October 15th — A Chinese social media influencer known as Luo Xiao Mao Mao Zi committed suicide on a Douyin livestream by drinking pesticide. She mentioned that she has been struggling with depression.
- November 7th — A transgender man, Samuel Hervey, died by setting himself on fire in Bishkek, Kyrgyzstan. Harvey had planned the suicide for years, but was also influenced by the 764 group.

=== 2022 ===
- January 17th — A 13-year-old boy from Gig Harbor, Washington, United States, named Jay Taylor committed suicide by hanging on an Instagram livestream after members from the 764 group who met him on Discord coerced him to do it.
- March 25th — Two cousins from St. Louis, 12-year-old Paris Harvey and 14-year-old Kuaron Harvey were playing with a gun on an Instagram livestream, when Paris accidentally shot Kuaron, and seconds later, she shot herself. Paris' mother said "It was not a suicide. It was just a freak accident".

=== 2023 ===
- October 2nd — In the afternoon, two teenagers, 17-year-old Viktoria "Vika" Polyvach and 18-year-old Volodymyr "Vova" Polyvach started a livestream on TikTok (also re-streamed on Instagram) and committing suicide by jumping off a high-rise apartment building from the 24th floor in Kyiv, Ukraine. They have also posted several dozen videos on their Telegram channel.
- October 9th — A 23-year-old Italian Call of Duty cosplayer, Vincent Plicchi, known online as Inquisitor Ghost, died by suicide off-camera while on a TikTok livestream in Bologna, Italy. Prior to his death, he had been cyberbullied from people believing false allegations that accused him of grooming a minor.

=== 2024 ===
- February 25th — A 25-year-old United States Air Force serviceman, Aaron Bushnell, died after setting himself on fire outside the front gate of the Embassy of Israel in Washington D.C. on a Twitch livestream, protesting the U.S.’s support for Israel in the Gaza war.

=== 2026 ===
- May 18th — Two teenage gunmen, identified as Cain Clark and Caleb Vazquez, fatally shot three people outside the Islamic Center of San Diego before dying from self-inflicted gunshot wounds. They livestreamed the attack; during the stream, Clark shot Vazquez twice before turning the weapon on himself.
- August 5th — A 25-year-old Japanese influencer known as Mina Chan died of suicide by hanging herself during a TikTok livestream in Seoul, South Korea.
- August 18th — Muhammad Mael Jalani, perpetrator of the Ateneo de Zamboanga University shooting, fatally shot himself on a Facebook livestream in Zamboanga City, Philippines.
- October 20th — A 30-year-old German video game developer who went by the name of Manuel Alexander Otto died of an apparent suicide via self-immolation in his attic, followed by a fire in his apartment while streaming on Twitch in Breitbrunn am Chiemsee, Bavaria, Germany. He had also made the game Stick Run in August 2010 at 14 years old.

== See also ==
- Trash stream
- Livestreamed crime
- Copycat suicide
- Ricardo López (stalker)
- Live television suicide
