= Death of Brandon Vedas =

2003 drug overdose death

Brandon Vedas
- Born: Brandon Carl Vedas; April 21, 1981
- Died: January 12, 2003 (aged 21); Phoenix, Arizona, U.S.
- Cause of death: Drug overdose
- Occupations: Computer enthusiast; recreational drug user
- Known for: Overdose caught on webcam

Brandon Carl Vedas (April 21, 1981 – January 12, 2003), also known by his nickname ripper on IRC, was an American computer enthusiast, recreational drug user and member of the Shroomery.org community, who died of a multiple drug overdose while discussing what he was doing via chat and webcam. His death led to debate about the responsibilities and roles of online communities in life-threatening situations.

== Overview ==
The video chat session began when Vedas logged into the IRC channel and announced "i got a grip of drugs", inviting other users to access his webcam feed and watch him take them. While some of the substances were illicit, most of them had apparently been obtained through legitimate prescriptions for treatment of various illnesses from which Vedas was said to have suffered.

Vedas then began consuming psilocybe mushrooms, which had been stored in a prescription medication bottle. As the chat session progressed, one of the users in the channel, grphish, noted "that's a lot of klonopin" and this is thought to be when Vedas consumed 8 mg of clonazepam. Vedas continued by showing the webcam viewers what would be one of four bottles of methadone that he would consume over the course of the session, and, after noting this on the channel, proceeded to consume an entire bottle (reportedly 80 mg of methadone). After a brief respite, Vedas then consumed 110 mg of propranolol (Inderal), two Vicodin tablets, and 120 mg temazepam, which seem to have been taken in between descriptions given on the IRC channel.

During this process, Vedas maintained that this was "usual weekend behavior" for him and that he had consumed similar quantities of the same substances on previous occasions. "I told u I was hardcore" was one of the last things Vedas typed, and he was found dead by his mother the next day.

== See also ==
- Drug overdose
- Social media and suicide
- Suicide of Kevin Whitrick
- Suicide of Ronnie McNutt
