= Museum of Hoaxes =

Website

- Owner: Alex Boese
- Website: hoaxes.org
- Launched: 1997

The Museum of Hoaxes is a website created by Alex Boese in 1997 in San Diego, California, as a resource for reporting and discussing hoaxes and urban legends, both past and present.

In 2004, PC Magazine included the site as one of the "Top 100 Sites You Didn't Know You Couldn't Live Without", and Sci Fi Weekly named it "site of the week" for the week beginning 7 February 2007.

Boese has published two books on hoaxes: Museum of Hoaxes and Hippo Eats Dwarf: A Field Guide to Hoaxes and Other B.S. A third book by Boese, Elephants on Acid, focuses on unusual scientific experiments, with the follow-up Electrified Sheep published in 2011. His latest book Psychedelic Apes, about the weirdest theories in science and history, was published in 2019.

== Notable hoaxes covered ==
- 90 Day Jane
