= Bodybuilding.com =

American dietary supplements company

- Type: Subsidiary
- Industry: Ecommerce, Fitness Industry
- Founded: February 16, 1999; 27 years ago
- Founder: Ryan DeLuca
- Headquarters: Boise, Idaho, U.S.
- Key people: CEO Karl Walsh
- Products: Dietary supplements
- Number of employees: 450
- Parent: Retail Ecommerce Ventures
- Website: bodybuilding.com

Bodybuilding.com is an American online retailer of dietary supplements and bodybuilding supplements, based in Boise, Idaho. The site also once had a highly popular forum section which was shut down in September 2024.

In September 2015, the CEO and founder Ryan DeLuca stepped down from his role, announcing he would be succeeded on an interim basis by Liberty Media CFO Chris Shean. Chris Shean was subsequently replaced with the appointment of Karl Walsh in October 2021.

== History ==
Bodybuilding.com grew out of wholesale-creatine.com, an online storefront created by teenage web marketer and amateur bodybuilder Ryan DeLuca in 1997, to capitalize on the rising popularity of creatine supplements.

A majority stake in Bodybuilding.com was acquired in July 2006 by Milestone Partners for an undisclosed amount.

In 2007, an FDA agent purchased several supplements from Bodybuilding.com which were determined to contain anabolic steroids. In May 2012, the company was fined $7 million, and as part of the settlement, CEO DeLuca and his brother Jeremy were both fined $600,000 for selling misbranded drugs.

In January 2008, Liberty Media Corporation acquired a controlling stake in Bodybuilding.com for more than $100 million. DeLuca stayed on as the company's CEO.

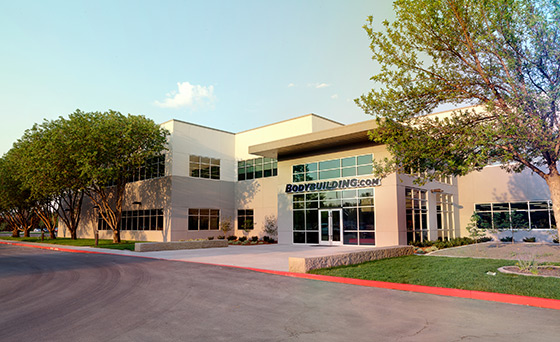
Bodybuilding.com's headquarters in Boise

As of 2014, it has 450 employees working at 3 locations, including distribution centers in North Las Vegas, Nevada; Shiremanstown, Pennsylvania; and Bedfordshire, U.K. The corporate headquarters is also located in Boise, along with the company's customer service call center.

In 2013, the company donated the equipment for Boise's first outdoor gym, located in Ann Morrison Park.

In September 2015, Ryan Deluca suddenly announced he would be stepping down from his position as CEO. In November, Liberty Interactive spun off Bodybuilding.com and its stake in Expedia into a new company, Liberty Expedia Holdings. After Bodybuilding.com laid off 90 people in December 2016, it reorganized to form 4 different companies/brands.

In February 2019, hackers accessed some part of Bodybuilding.com's corporate IT systems, and may have retrieved personal data of the site's users. Sometime in the next few months, the company discovered this, but did not publicize it right away, instead hiring a security company to assess what their vulnerability had been. It was found that at least one of Bodybuilding.com's 450 employees had been susceptible to a phishing email sent in July 2018. It was not determined if the hackers accessed user data. In April 2019, Bodybuilding.com publicized the breach, saying its consequences were unknown, and reset all the passwords of the site's users.

By 2025, many of Bodybuilding.com's devoted users felt that, in modern times, the company had deviated from the site's "grassroots culture" by simplifying its design to maximize corporate profit, and then not responding to users' negative reception to those changes. In one instance, the company shut down the site's highly-popular forum section (see below). The number of visitors to the site dropped prior to November 2025, when the company apologized to its users; they stated the site had become "less connected to the people who built this brand—you", and promised a redesign based on users' suggestions, which would launch in 2026.

== Forums ==
Bodybuilding.com once had the most popular Internet forums dedicated to fitness discussion. After its closure, Aftermath's Chris Person wrote that in the history of forums, it "was so gargantuan it barely needs mentioning". As of 2022, 18 million people used them, making them one of the last remaining, popular Web 1.0 forums. They were known for having a large amount of trolling; a politically diverse userbase (notable in comparison to other forums like right-wing 4chan); and expansive discussion of subjects unrelated to fitness, in the Misc. (miscellaneous) subforum. Users of the subforum were known as "Miscers".

In health-related posts, users often logged their workouts, signed up for bodybuilding challenges made by others, reviewed supplements, and gave others motivational support. Notable users included WWE wrestler Lars Sullivan; bodybuilder Zyzz (who died of cardiac arrest in 2011, possibly from anabolic steroid use); and Elliot Rodger, the perpetrator of the 2014 Isla Vista killings. In 2014, the forums popularized the word "nutting" as slang for ejaculation.

The forums were involved in many controversies. In 2008, a man named Abraham Biggs died of suicide after being bullied on the site. He livestreamed his suicide on Justin.tv, and posted a link to the stream on the forums beforehand. In 2011, user ThePoz discovered an exploit that allowed anyone to access private photographs of Facebook CEO Mark Zuckerberg on the Facebook site itself, then publicized the method on the forums. It also popularized the GOMAD diet (drinking one gallon of milk a day) and dry-scooping (consuming pre-workout powder stimulants without water), methods which are known to be dangerous.

=== 2008 days-in-a-week debate ===
The forums are notable for a thread titled "Full Body Workout Every Other Day?", created on May 17, 2008, in which two users had a long and intense debate over the number of days in a week. It started when user m1ndless posted: "If I go [to the gym] every other day I will be at the gym 4-5 times a week, is that over training? [...]" User steviekm3 responded: "That makes no sense. There are only 7 days in a week. If you go every other day that is 3.5 times a week." m1ndless, posting as "TheJosh" from this point on, responded: "Monday, Wednesday, Friday, Sunday. That is 4 days. How do you go 3.5 times? Do a half workout or something? lol". User Justin27 agreed with stevekm3: "7x in 2 weeks = 3.5 times a week, genius."

The debate continued for two days, mostly between TheJosh and Justin27. It narrowed down to a disagreement over if a week constitutes seven or eight days; Justin27 defined it as seven, from Sunday to Saturday, while TheJosh defined it as eight, from Sunday to the next Sunday. It then hinged on if Sunday was a "real day". English dictionaries universally define a week as having seven days, including Sunday.

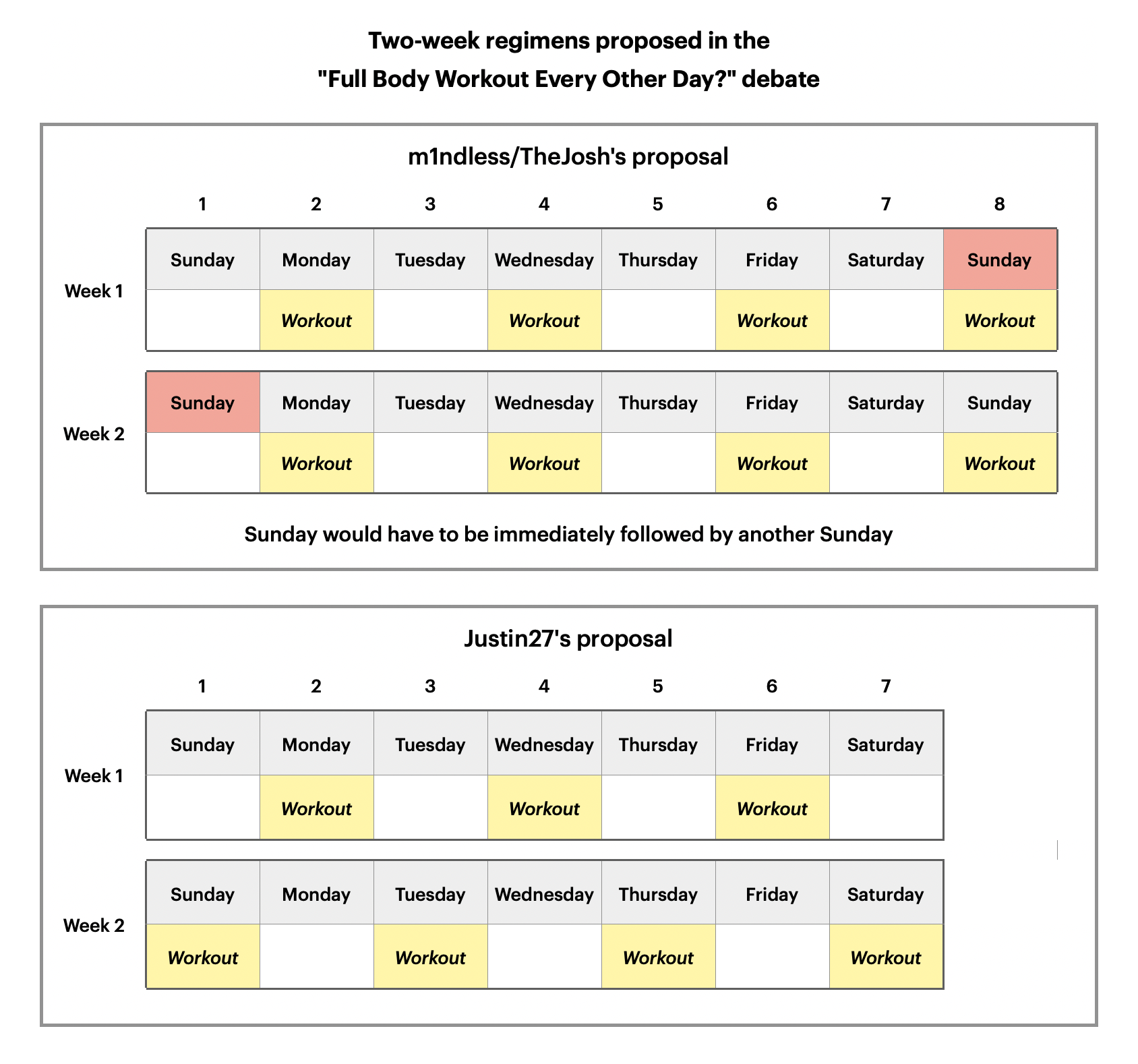

The two users' rhetoric intensified to where they were posting harsh insults, such as when Justin27 told TheJosh: "You are the dumbest boy alive. Jump off a bridge." After 120 posts across five web pages, the thread was locked by moderators, without the two coming to an agreement. TheJosh ended the debate by saying they had only been trolling, which SB Nation writer Jon Bois theorized was an attempt to maintain their dignity after being publicly embarrassed.

As of 2016, the thread had 3 million page views since its creation. It had gone viral after being posted on Reddit in 2015. However, the debate "had been raging in the minds of" Bodybuilding.com's users since 2008. It was the subject of a 2016 SB Nation documentary titled The Dumbest Boy Alive by Bois, who referred to it as the "perhaps the dumbest argument in the history of the Internet". Deadspin writer Albert Burneko claimed it was "the least essential discussion ever had", and Chris Person said it was "the stuff of legends".

In 2015, Vice magazine contacted U.S.-based mathematician Joanna Nelson for a resolution to the debate. She said that TheJosh would have to schedule their workouts in two-week chunks, as a week is seven days, supposedly from Monday to Sunday. The Britannica Dictionary writes that a week is usually defined as Sunday to Saturday in American English, and Monday to Sunday in British English. TheJosh's account stated they were from the U.S., while Justin27's location was not listed.

=== 2014 thread refuting user's murder and manslaughter accusations ===
On August 8, 2014, Australian woman Warriena Wright fatally fell from the balcony of her apartment in Surfers Paradise, Queensland. This happened in front of her date, Gable Tostee, and he was soon charged in court with murder and manslaughter. Tostee had been a prominent Miscer under the name "GT". On December 10, he began a thread on Misc. titled "Regarding the balcony tragedy" by posting a full testimony and defense of his actions on the night of Wright's death. He defended having made an audio recording of the falling on his phone, saying that Wright was acting aggressively and erratically beforehand, and he had been worried about what would happen next. He also gave reasons for calling his father and then buying pizza after she fell; prior to the thread, media outlets had theorized that these were signs of guilt. Furthermore, Tostee posted photos of Wright's apartment that he had taken that night. In 2016, a court found him not guilty of the charges against him. (Note: In 2022, staff at The Star Gold Coast resort in Queensland alleged they had caught Tostee fighting a woman in her hotel room while trying to forcibly undress her. He sported bite marks and bruises after the fight. Tostee claims he was not trying to undress her, and that she had been suffering a "dissociative incident" that caused the fight; he later alleged that local police told him they would not press charges against him for that reason.)

=== 2024 discontinuation ===
In September 2024, the forums were discontinued by Bodybuilding.com, and its webpages redirected to a company statement which mentioned: "No good growth came without change. We're building new ways to connect our global community". This was highly controversial among the site's long-time visitors. Many of its users migrated to successor forums, mainly Newmisc.com. As of May 2026, the forums are to be on track to return; when users visit the forums section of the website they're prompted with a splash screen stating such.

== See also ==
- List of Internet forums
