= Suicide of Daniel Jones =

American suicide victim (1958–1998)

Daniel Jones
- Born: Daniel Victor Jones; April 15, 1958; Long Beach, California, U.S.
- Died: April 30, 1998 (aged 40); Los Angeles, California, U.S.
- Cause of death: Suicide by gunshot
- Occupation: Maintenance worker

Daniel Victor Jones (April 15, 1958 – April 30, 1998) was an American man who died by suicide on a Los Angeles freeway in 1998. The incident was broadcast on live television by news helicopters. Jones took his own life as a form of protest towards health maintenance organizations after he had been diagnosed as HIV-positive several months earlier. Footage of his suicide was shown in the 2002 documentary film Bowling for Columbine.

== Biography ==
Daniel Victor Jones was born on April 15, 1958, and was from Long Beach, California. He worked as a maintenance worker at the Renaissance Hotel in Long Beach, a job he had been employed at since 1995. He lived in a small two-bedroom bungalow off an alleyway in Long Beach. He lived alone with his pet dog Gladdis, a seven-year-old Labrador-whippet mixed-breed.

By April 1998, Jones was suffering from both HIV and cancer. His neighbors and fellow workers were unaware that he had any health problems. Jones confided to a friend in early April that he had found a flesh-colored growth on his neck. The doctors at first were unsure of its cause but later confirmed that it was cancer. Jones believed he was being misled by his health insurer and also told his best friend that he was HIV-positive.

== Death ==
=== Standpoint ===
By the end of April 1998, Jones believed he was going to die and so decided to take his own life in a way that would draw publicity, saying in his taped live suicide note, "I'm not happy with what's happening to my situation and I'm going to draw attention to it whichever way I can. My paramount goal is for no one other than myself to get hurt."

=== Suicide ===
On Thursday, April 30, 1998, around 3:00 p.m., 40-year-old Jones parked his dark gray 1994 Toyota Pickup truck on the transition loop from the Harbor Freeway (I-110) to the Century Freeway (I-105) in Los Angeles (33°55′53.1″N 118°16′50.1″W). He sat in the front of his truck with his dog Gladdis. He began pointing a loaded shotgun at passing cars on the freeway, causing motorists to report him to the police. Jones himself then called 911, revealing he was emotionally distraught about health maintenance organizations (HMOs) and the circumstances surrounding his HIV. He said that he was in pain because of mistreatment by the HMO in whose care he had been placed. He complained that it would take him a month to schedule an appointment with a doctor and another month to get the results of a test. As was confirmed later, aside from being HIV-positive, Jones also suffered from cancer. During the call, he fired off several rounds from his shotgun, with one of them going through the roof of his truck. Authorities then closed the two freeways, preventing anyone from approaching him. Jones remained in his truck the entire time, as police and news helicopters monitored his movements. The Los Angeles County Sheriff's Department Special Weapons Team began to assemble and got into position around him. Jones then reached into a backpack he owned and took out clothing and a videotape. He then began throwing the items over the freeway wall. Afterwards, he got out of the truck and walked across the empty freeway.

Jones unfurled a large, square banner with white handlettering that read: "HMO's are in it for the money!! Live free, love safe or die." He had made the banner specifically for the occasion and displayed it for the news helicopters to see. As it was fairly windy on the interstate at the time, Jones weighted the banner down with a container to stop it blowing away. He continued to make obscene gestures and returned to his truck several times to pet his dog. As authorities prepared to negotiate with him, Jones suddenly returned to his truck and sat in the front seat. Intending to take his own life, he ignited a Molotov cocktail inside his truck. The vehicle suddenly burst into flames and was set ablaze. Jones got out of the vehicle however and ran across the freeway as he was engulfed in flames and smoke, with his hair, pants and socks all on fire. He tried to pat out the flames and managed to peel off his pants. He then continued to wander about looking dazed and disoriented. He walked to the edge of the freeway gesturing angrily. It appeared as if he was about to jump off the freeway; however, he changed his mind and backed away from the edge, before returning to his blazing truck. Moments later, at around 3:50 p.m., Jones retrieved his shotgun from the back of the truck and then walked back across the freeway. He placed the muzzle of the shotgun beneath his chin, pulled the trigger and shot himself. He then fell to the ground with the cameras still rolling and playing the event live to viewers watching at home. As it was a Thursday afternoon, it was witnessed by many children, whose after-school cartoons had been interrupted to broadcast the incident. Jones died 15 days after his 40th birthday.

=== Aftermath ===
The standoff between Jones and the police had lasted close to 50 minutes. Police were concerned that there was a bomb or multiple booby traps still inside the truck. Therefore, they hesitated to move in. The truck meanwhile continued to burn with Jones' dog still trapped inside it. Eventually, police approached the truck and searched the inside of it. They found the remnants of several Molotov cocktails, a number of shotgun shells and the charred remains of the dog, who had died in the fire.

During the standoff, Jones had thrown a videotape over the freeway wall. When recovered by the authorities, who viewed the video, it was discovered that it was a videotaped suicide note recorded by Jones on the previous day. In the video, he sat on his couch next to his dog and said, "I'm not going to fight the disease. It has affected my neurological system. I'm not going to end up crazy." A police source who viewed the video said that Jones complained he was in pain. The videotape explained Jones' motivations and laid blame for his suicide. He reportedly says in the video, "I'm a dead man," and signs off by declaring, "See ya!"

== Criticism of live broadcasting ==
Because Jones' suicide was witnessed by children, many criticized the Los Angeles television stations' practice of airing police pursuits live. The incident prompted a wave of criticism about live news broadcasts, proposing changes in the way they were handled in the future. A total of seven television stations broadcast Jones' suicide live. KABC-TV channel 7 immediately inserted a brief Special Report on the suicide during The Oprah Winfrey Show, while both KTLA channel 5 and KTTV channel 11 had interrupted children's programming to cover the suicide, while KNBC channel 4 had interrupted The Rosie O'Donnell Show. Both KNBC and KTLA had their cameras tightest on the coverage and so viewers were able to see the graphic suicide in close detail. KNBC issued an apology saying, "We did not anticipate this man's actions in time to cut away, and we deeply regret that any of our viewers saw this tragedy on our air." The station, as well as the Fox Broadcasting affiliate, offered viewers numbers they could call for counseling. KTLA also released a statement saying, "KTLA shares with its viewers their distress."

KCBS-TV channel 2 moved to a wide shot before Jones took his life because they were reportedly concerned over his erratic behavior. The channel brought a psychologist into the studio later that day to hold a live discussion regarding distressing live media coverage. They later released a statement saying, "This is the danger of live television, you've got to be on your toes, and you have to be ready to pull back immediately." KCAL-TV channel 9 reportedly received an estimated 120 calls during the broadcast prior to Jones even taking his life, requesting the station to cut away from the story before things got out of hand.

== In popular culture ==
The footage of Jones' suicide has been shown in many documentaries outlining the incident. It appeared in Michael Moore's 2002 documentary film Bowling for Columbine.

== See also ==
- R. Budd Dwyer
- Christine Chubbuck
- Killing of Brian Thompson
- Murders of Alison Parker and Adam Ward
- Suicide of Ronnie McNutt
- Self-immolation of Aaron Bushnell
