= Live television suicide =

Suicides broadcast on live television

Live television suicides are instances where an act of suicide is broadcast during a live programme. Such incidents are extremely rare in television broadcasting. Nevertheless, every such incident attracts widespread public attention and becomes the subject of fierce debate regarding journalistic ethics, the psychological impact on viewers and the risk of copycat behaviour.

In response to such incidents, the television industry has developed both technical preventive measures (such as signal delay) and professional conventions restricting the broadcast of graphic scenes of death.

In the modern era, the problem has shifted to the internet, to streaming platforms and social media, where users occasionally broadcast suicides in real time.

== History ==
The first known case of suicide during a live television broadcast is considered to be that of Christine Chubbuck on July 15, 1974. While on air, she said to the camera:

“In keeping with the WXLT practice of presenting the most immediate and complete reports of local blood-and-guts news, TV-40 presents what is believed to be a television first. In living color, an exclusive coverage of an attempted suicide.”

Chubbuck then took a .38-caliber revolver out of her purse and placed it against the base of her skull. She pulled the trigger, becoming the first person to commit suicide on live television. This recording still exists; the station owner's widow inherited the unviewed video and placed it with a major law firm, out of the public eye.

On April 30, 1998 – Daniel Victor Jones, a 40-year-old maintenance worker from Long Beach, California, died by suicide on a Los Angeles freeway during a live television broadcast by news helicopters. Jones, who was HIV-positive and had cancer, was protesting against health maintenance organizations (HMOs), which he blamed for delaying his medical care. During a 50-minute standoff with police, he set his truck on fire with a Molotov cocktail and then shot himself in the head with a shotgun; his dog perished in the fire. Seven television stations broadcast the incident live, interrupting children's programming and prompting widespread criticism of the stations' news-gathering practices.

In 2002, the Argentine 24-hour news channel Crónica came under fierce criticism after it broadcast a suicide attempt live. The broadcast, which took place in the TV station's lobby, continued uninterrupted for more than two hours and ended the moment the man shot himself in the head with a revolver. Viktor Hugo, 31 year-old, survived and was hospitalized in serious but stable condition. The incident sparked a wave of outrage: it was called an “ultimate reality show,” and the channel was accused of pandering to viewers’ basest instincts for the sake of ratings.

On September 28, 2012 Fox News aired a suicide live on the air: after a car chase, a man got out of his car and shot himself in the head. The broadcast was delayed by five seconds, but a “gross human error” allowed the incident to appear on viewers’ screens.

== Methods of censorship ==
In modern television control rooms, live broadcast censorship is a relatively simple technical process carried out using a signal delay system. Technical staff typically monitor two video feeds: the live feed and the delayed feed, which goes on the air with a delay of usually 5 to 10 seconds. If the producer notices unacceptable content in the live feed — such as profanity, nudity, or violence — he or she shouts the command “dump” or something similar. In some cases, another control room staff member may take on this role if the producer missed the incident, or the censor may work completely independently. Upon detecting a problem, the censor switches their attention to the delayed feed. When an unacceptable moment is about to appear on the air, they press the so-called “dump” button, which mutes the audio, blurs the image, or completely blackouts the feed. In live news reports, the producer sometimes does without the “dump” button, switching the broadcast from the scene of the incident back to the anchor in the studio with an urgent command such as “cut that.” The responsibility for pressing the “dump” button often falls on the producer or a designated staff member (“dump-button guy”), who must make decisions in a fraction of a second.

In the case of Fox News in 2012, when footage of a suicide was broadcast, the network was airing the feed with a five-second delay, but, according to the company, a “serious human error” allowed the incident to reach viewers’ screens.

== Notable cases ==
=== United States ===
- July 15, 1974 – American television journalist Christine Chubbuck committed suicide during a live television broadcast.
- January 22, 1987 – R. Budd Dwyer committed suicide during a press conference in his office in the Pennsylvania Finance Building.
- April 30, 1998 – Suicide of Daniel Jones was broadcast live on television from news helicopters.
- September 28, 2012 – Fox News accidentally aired JoDon Romero's suicide live on air: the carjacker shot himself during a police chase.

=== Netherlands ===
- November 29, 2017 – Slobodan Praljak, a former general of the Croatian armed forces drank poison in the courtroom of the International Criminal Tribunal for the former Yugoslavia in The Hague, immediately after the verdict was announced. The broadcast was carried live, and his death was captured on camera.

== See also ==
- Trash stream
- Livestreamed suicide
- Livestreamed crime
- Copycat suicide
