= Suicide of Christine Chubbuck =

First suicide on live television

Christine Chubbuck
- Chubbuck in 1974
- Born: August 24, 1944; East Cleveland, Ohio, U.S.
- Died: July 15, 1974 (aged 29); Sarasota, Florida, U.S.
- Cause of death: Suicide by gunshot
- Resting place: Cremated; ashes scattered into the Gulf of Mexico
- Education: Boston University (BA)
- Occupation: Television news reporter
- Known for: First person to die by suicide on live television
- Television: WVIZ, WQED, WTOG, WXLT-TV

Christine Chubbuck (Note: Mistakenly reported as "Hubbock" by some sources.) (August 24, 1944 – July 15, 1974) was an American television news reporter who worked for stations WTOG and WXLT-TV in Sarasota, Florida. She is best known for being the first person to die by suicide on a live television broadcast.

Chubbuck shot herself in the head on July 15, 1974, during WXLT-TV's Suncoast Digest, after claiming that the network was about to present "an exclusive coverage of an attempted suicide"; it was confirmed after her death that she had added the quote in her script for the broadcast, making the action likely premeditated.

== Early life and education ==
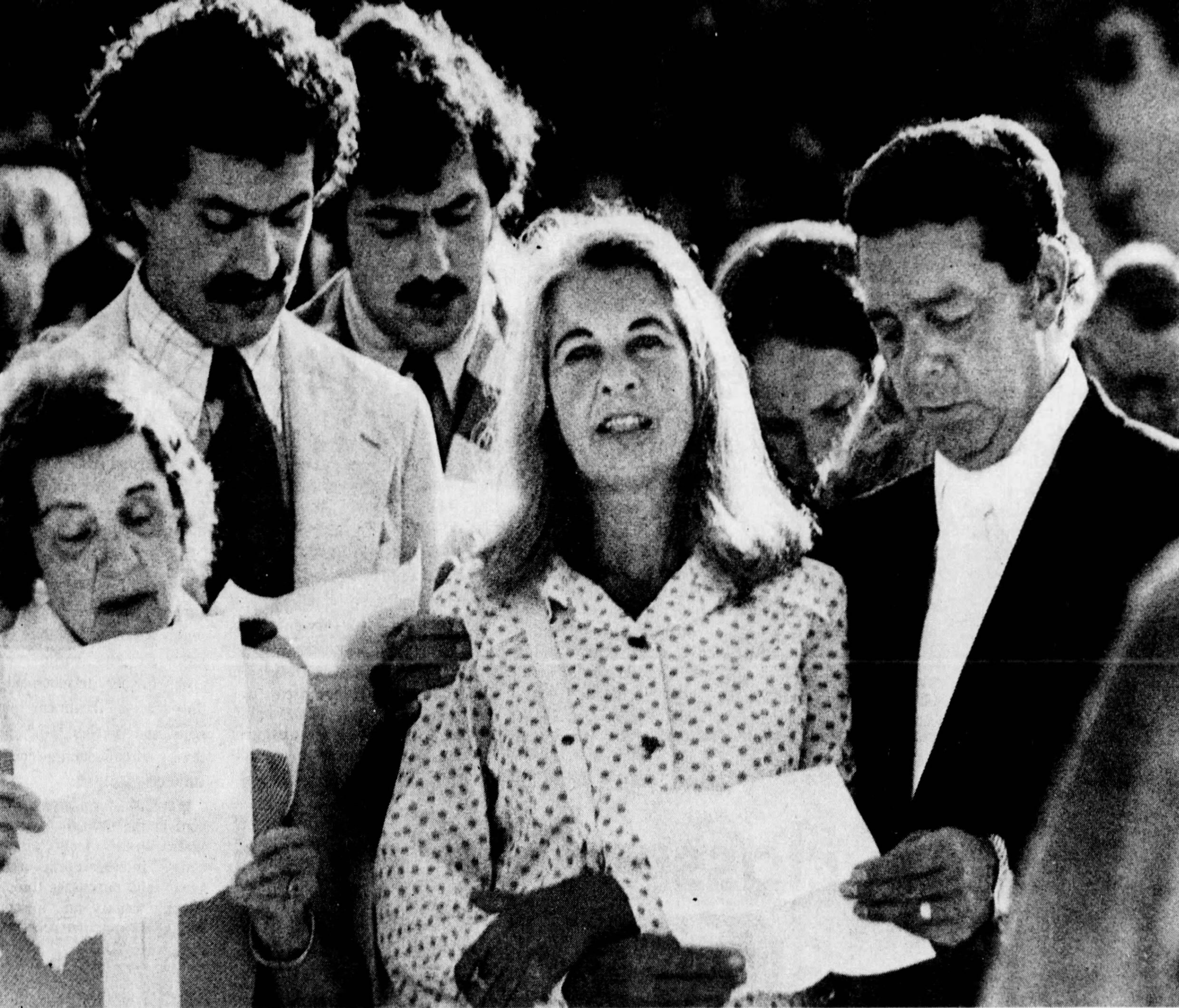
Chubbuck's family in 1974. From left to right: Stephen (Christine's grandmother), Tim, Greg, Margretha, George

Christine Chubbuck was born on August 24, 1944, in East Cleveland, Ohio, the daughter of George Fairbank Chubbuck and Margretha Augusta "Peg" (née Davis). She had two brothers, Greg and Tim. Chubbuck attended the Laurel School for Girls in Shaker Heights, a suburb of Cleveland. During her years at Laurel, she jokingly formed a "Dateless Wonder Club" with other "rejected" girls who did not have dates on Saturday nights.

Chubbuck attended Miami University in Oxford, Ohio, for one year, majoring in theater arts, then attended Endicott College in Beverly, Massachusetts, before earning a degree in broadcasting at Boston University in 1965. According to her brother Greg, Chubbuck dated a man in his 30s at age 21 but their father disapproved. She never entered another romantic relationship before her death.

== Television career ==
=== Early work ===
Chubbuck worked for WVIZ in Cleveland between 1966 and 1967 working with station publications, and attended a summer workshop in radio and television at New York University in 1967. That same year, she worked in Canton, Ohio, and, for three months, at WQED-TV in Pittsburgh, Pennsylvania, as an assistant producer for two local shows, Women's World and Keys to the City. In 1968, Chubbuck left WQED to spend four years as a hospital computer operator and two years with a cable television firm in Sarasota, Florida. Immediately before joining ABC affiliate WXLT-TV (now WWSB), she worked in the traffic department of WTOG in St. Petersburg.

Several years before her death, Chubbuck had moved into her family's summer cottage on Siesta Key. Sally Quinn of The Washington Post later reported that she had painted the bedroom and canopied bed to look like that of a young teenager. After Chubbuck's parents were divorced, her mother Peg and younger brother Greg came to live in the Florida home. When Greg left, her elder brother Tim moved in. Chubbuck had a close relationship with her family, describing her mother and Greg as her closest friends.

=== WXLT-TV ===
WXLT's owner, Bob Nelson, hired Chubbuck as a reporter, but later gave her a community affairs talk show, Suncoast Digest, which ran at 9:00 am. Production Manager Gordon J. Acker described Chubbuck's new show to a local paper: "It will feature local people and local activities. It will give attention, for instance, to the storefront organizations that are concerned with alcoholics, drug users, and other 'lost' segments of the community." Page five of the article showed a smiling Chubbuck posed with a WXLT camera.

Chubbuck took her position seriously, inviting local officials from Sarasota and Bradenton to discuss matters of interest to the growing beach community. After her death, the Sarasota Herald-Tribune reported that she had been nominated for a Forestry and Conservation Recognition Award by the Bradenton district office of the Florida Division of Forestry. Chubbuck was considered a "strong contender" by district forester Mike Keel. He had been scheduled to appear as a guest on Chubbuck's show the morning of her suicide, but canceled because of the birth of his son. On occasion, Chubbuck incorporated homemade puppets she had used to entertain children with intellectual disabilities during her volunteer work at Sarasota Memorial Hospital.

== Death ==
=== Depression ===
Chubbuck spoke to her family at length about her struggles with depression and suicidal tendencies, though she did not inform them of her intent to die by suicide on live television. She had attempted to overdose on drugs in 1970 and frequently made reference to that event. Chubbuck had been seeing a psychiatrist up until several weeks before her death. Her mother chose not to tell WXLT management about her daughter's suicidal tendencies because she feared Chubbuck would be fired.

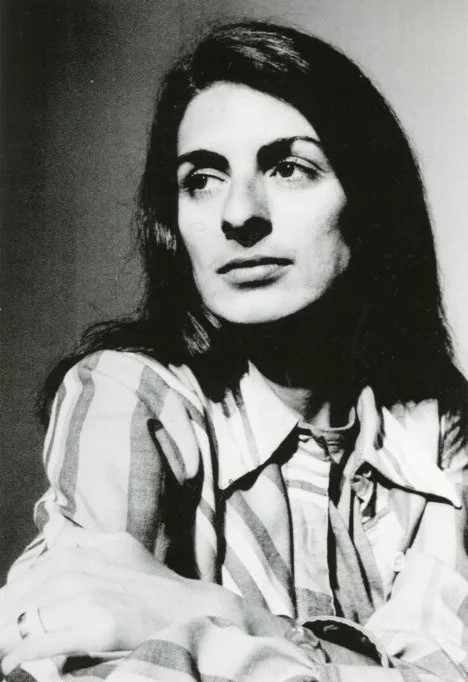
Chubbuck in 1974

Chubbuck's focus on her lack of intimate relationships is generally considered to be the driving force for her depression. Her mother later summarized that "her suicide was simply because her personal life was not enough." She lamented to co-workers that her 30th birthday was approaching, and she was still a virgin who had never been on more than two dates with a man. Her brother Greg later recalled a man that she had gone out with several times before moving to Sarasota, but agreed that his sister had trouble connecting socially in the beach resort town. He believed her constant self-deprecation for being "dateless" contributed to her ongoing depression.

According to Quinn, Chubbuck had an unrequited crush on co-worker George Peter Ryan. She baked him a cake for his birthday and sought his romantic attention, only to find out he was already involved with sports reporter Andrea Kirby. Kirby had been the co-worker closest to Chubbuck, but she was offered a new job in Baltimore, which had further depressed Chubbuck. Her lack of a romantic partner was considered a tangent of her desperate need to have close friends, though co-workers said she tended to be brusque and defensive whenever they made friendly gestures toward her. She was self-deprecating, criticizing herself constantly and rejecting any compliments others paid her. Chubbuck had her right ovary removed in an operation the year before her suicide, and had been told that if she did not become pregnant within two to three years, it was unlikely she would ever be able to conceive.

A week before her suicide, she told night news editor Rob Smith that she had bought a gun and joked about killing herself on air. Smith later stated that he did not respond to what he thought was Chubbuck's "sick" attempt at humor, and changed the subject. She had also hosted a party just days before the incident. Craig Sager, a WXLT sportscaster who later gained fame as a sideline reporter for Turner Sports, was among those who attended. "She was having a great time. It was like, 'Oh My God' this is such a different side to her," Sager recalled. "That was her going away party and it was her chance to say goodbye to everyone, but of course we didn't realize it at the time. It was just so shocking." Sager had been covering spring training for baseball when he learned of Chubbuck's suicide.

=== Suicide ===
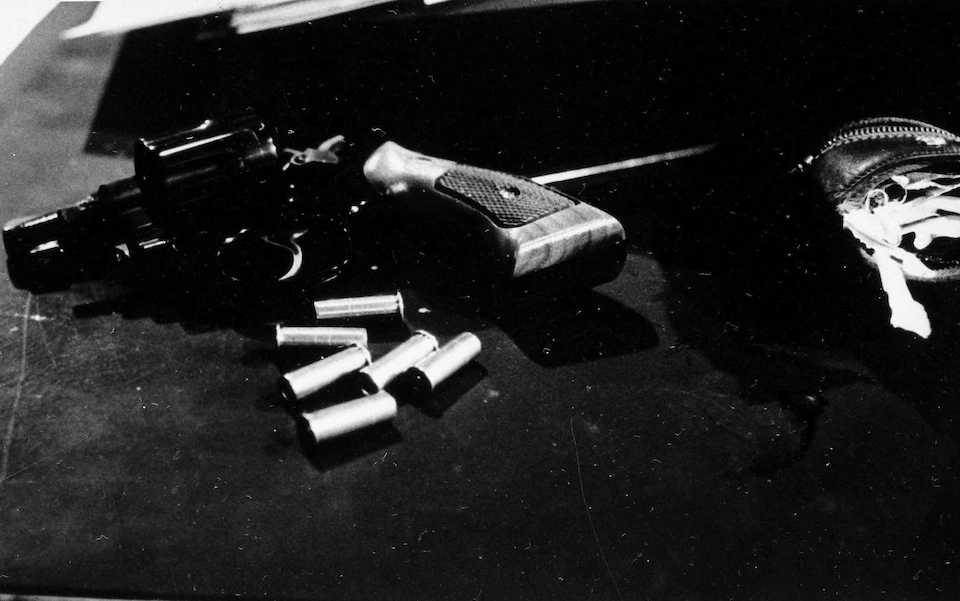
The revolver used by Chubbuck

On the morning of July 15, 1974, Chubbuck confused co-workers by claiming she had to read a newscast to open Suncoast Digest, something she had never done before. That morning's guest waited across the studio while Chubbuck sat at the news anchor's desk. During the first eight minutes of her program, Chubbuck covered three national news stories and then a shooting from the previous day at a local restaurant, Beef & Bottle, at the Sarasota-Bradenton Airport.

The film reel of the restaurant shooting had jammed and would not run, so Chubbuck shrugged it off and said on-camera:

In keeping with the WXLT practice of presenting the most immediate and complete reports of local blood-and-guts news, TV-40 presents what is believed to be a television first. In living color, an exclusive coverage of an attempted suicide.

She drew a .38-caliber Smith and Wesson revolver from a shopping bag from behind her desk and shot herself behind the right ear. After she fell forward violently, the technical director rapidly faded the broadcast to black.

She had written something like "TV-40 news personality Christine Chubbuck shot herself in a live broadcast this morning on a Channel 40 talk program. She was rushed to Sarasota Memorial Hospital, where she remains in critical condition."

— Mike Simmons, TV-40 news director, quoted from UPI

The station quickly ran a standard public service announcement and then a movie. Some television viewers called the police, while others called the station to inquire if the shooting was staged. After the shooting, news director Mike Simmons found the papers from which Chubbuck had been reading her newscast contained a complete script of her program, including not only the shooting but also a third-person account to be read by whichever staff member took over the broadcast after the incident. He said her script called for her condition to be listed as "critical".

Chubbuck was taken to Sarasota Memorial Hospital, where she was pronounced dead fourteen hours later. Upon receiving the news, a WXLT staffer released the information to other stations using Chubbuck's script. For a time, WXLT aired reruns of the TV series Gentle Ben in place of Suncoast Digest.

=== Aftermath ===
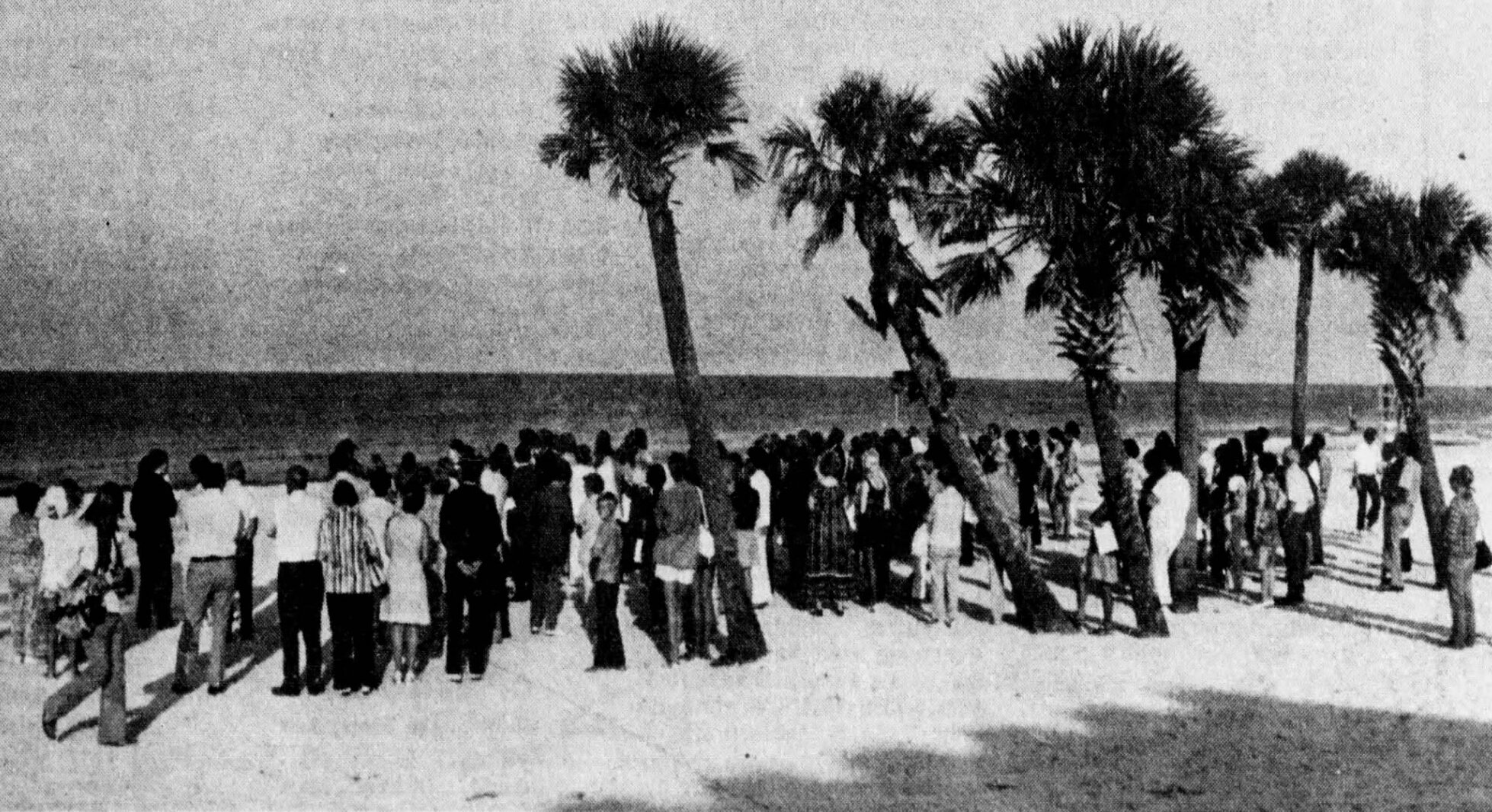
Crowd gathered at the memorial held for Chubbuck

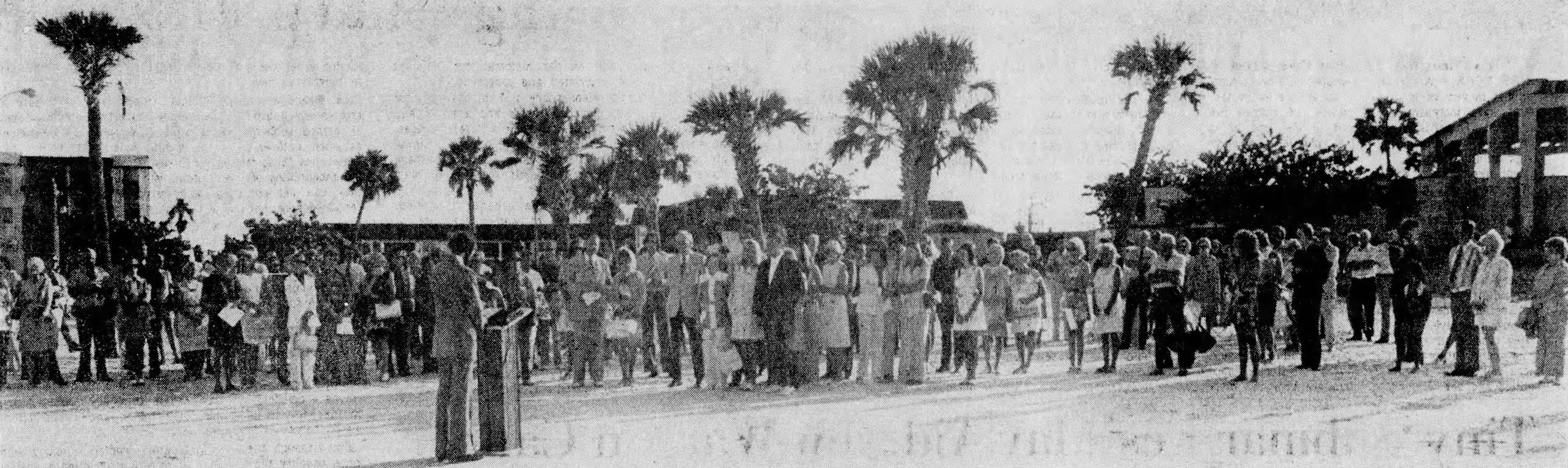
Rev. Thomas Beason delivering the eulogy

Chubbuck's body was cremated. The funeral ceremony was held on the beach, where her ashes were scattered into the Gulf of Mexico. Approximately 120 people attended, including local officials who had appeared on her show. Three songs by her favorite singer, Roberta Flack, were played. Presbyterian minister Thomas Beason delivered the eulogy, stating, "We suffer at our sense of loss. We are shocked at the suddenness of her absence. We are frightened by her rage. In her manner of death, we take note of her loneliness and our own as well." Suncoast Digest stayed on the air for several years with new hosts. Simmons, the station director, said Chubbuck's suicide was unrelated to the station. "The crux of the situation was that she was a 29-year-old girl who wanted to be married and who wasn't," he said in 1977.

The broadcast of Chubbuck's death has not been seen since its airing, and numerous theories on what happened to the recording have been advanced. One was that the station owner Robert Nelson kept it, and it was in the possession of his widow, Mollie. It was confirmed in June 2016 that the recording of Chubbuck's death exists and had indeed been in Nelson's possession, but was handed over to a "very large law firm" for safekeeping by Mollie. She has no plans to make it publicly available. In 2007, Greg Chubbuck spoke publicly about his sister for the first time since 1974 in an E! television special. In 2008, the suicide hoax blog 90 Day Jane cited Chubbuck's death as inspiration.

== In popular culture ==
A widespread urban legend claims that Chubbuck's suicide inspired Paddy Chayefsky's script for the 1976 film Network, in which news anchor Howard Beale (Peter Finch) announces that he will kill himself live on-air. Dave Itzkoff, author of Mad as Hell: The Making of Network and the Fateful Vision of the Angriest Man in Movies, pointed out that Chayefsky was already working on the screenplay before Chubbuck's suicide. The only mention of Chubbuck that Itzkoff could find in Chayefsky's notes and papers was in one of the later drafts of the screenplay, where a line that was later deleted has Beale saying he will commit suicide "right on the air ... like that girl in Florida". When shooting Kate Plays Christine, director Robert Greene stated that "everyone he met in Sarasota believed that there was a connection" between Chubbuck and Network. Greene told Itzkoff that "I don’t mind that it's wrong ... It's about how her story reverberates in all these other ways. That being not quite true seems completely appropriate."

In 2003, Christopher Sorrentino published "Condition", a short story based on Chubbuck's suicide, in the literary magazine Conjunctions. In 2016, two films about Chubbuck played at the 2016 Sundance Film Festival. The first, Christine, was directed by Antonio Campos, and starred Rebecca Hall as Christine Chubbuck and Michael C. Hall as George Peter Ryan. The second was the documentary Kate Plays Christine, which depicts actress Kate Lyn Sheil's preparation for the role of Chubbuck in a hypothetical film.

In 2024, Australian deathcore band Volatile Ways released "Televised Suicide", a song featuring a sample of Chubbuck's last words and lyrics based off her death.

In 2025, Canadian alt-rock band Elita also released "Televised Suicide", a song written about Chubbuck's suicide and depression. The opening lines to the song are a direct reference to her final words.

== See also ==
- Assassination of Inejirō Asanuma, assassination of a Japanese politician during a televised political debate in 1960
- Livestreamed suicide
- Murders of Alison Parker and Adam Ward, murders of a reporter and photojournalist during a live television broadcast in 2015
- R. Budd Dwyer, a Pennsylvania politician who fatally shot himself in front of TV news cameras in 1987
- Suicide of Daniel Jones, an American man who died by suicide on live television in front of news helicopters in 1998
