= Roma Anglichanin =

Roman Nikolayevich Sashcheko Раман Мікалаевіч Сашчэка
- Also known as: Roma Anglichanin
- Born: 27 April 1988; Mogilev, Byelorussian Soviet Socialist Republic, USSR
- Died: July 30, 2017 (aged 29) Saint-Petersburg, Russia
- Genres: hip-hop • electronic rock • drum and bass • dub • brostep • indie rock • synth pop • trap
- Occupations: rapper record producer songwriter
- Years active: 2011—2017
- Member of: LSP; Gryaz

Roman Nikolayevich Sashcheko (Note: Russian: Роман Николаевич Сащеко, Belarusian: Раман Мікалаевіч Сашчэка, professionally known as Roma Anglichanin Russian: Рома Англичанин) (27 April 1988 — 30 July 2017) was a Belarusian music producer, rapper, songwriter, and former member of the groups LSP and Gryaz.

== Biography ==
Roman Nikolayevich Sashcheko was born on 27 April 1988 in Mogilev. In 2011, together with Denis Astapov, he founded the group Gryaz ("Dirt" ). In 2012, he began collaborating with Oleg Savchenko, better known as Oleg LSP. The artists met through a mutual acquaintance who had helped mix Savchenko’s EP 'Videt tsvetnyye sny' ("To See Colorful Dreams"). After they began working together, LSP became a duo consisting of Roman and Oleg. Their first joint work was the song "Nomera," released on 24 May 2012. It was included in the duo’s unnumbered studio album YOP.

During their collaboration as a group, three more releases followed: Viselittsa (2014), Magic City (2015), and Tragic City (2017). In 2015, Roman produced the track "Devochka Pizdets" for rapper Oxxxymiron’s album Gorgorod.

In 2017, in LSP’s track "Monetka," Roman made his debut as a performer — previously, he had worked solely as the project’s sound engineer. In the same year, as part of the group Gryaz, he released the tracks "BBN" and "Ya nenavizhu lyudey," both featuring his own verse.

=== Death ===
Roma Anglichanin died on 30 July 2017. The cause of death was not disclosed. Sashcheko was buried in one of the cemeteries near Mogilev. On 2 October 2017, a music video for the song "Telo," dedicated to Roman, was released. Roman was portrayed in the video by video blogger Dmitry Larin.
