= Hippo eats dwarf =

Urban legend

Hippo Eats Dwarf is the title of a hoax news article which claims that a dwarf was accidentally eaten by a hippopotamus. The urban legend has been circulating via the internet since the mid-1990s. Many print newspapers have been fooled into publishing the story as fact.

== Story ==
The story goes that a freak accident occurred at a circus during an act involving a dwarf bouncing on a trampoline. The dwarf jumped sideways off the trampoline just at the moment a hippopotamus began to yawn. The dwarf landed in the hippo's yawning mouth and was abruptly, and accidentally, swallowed whole. The audience applauded until they realised this was not part of the show and the true horror set in.

Euan Ferguson writing in The Observer in 2003 said the story is a marvelous metaphor for the reality that "Life is not safe. You can't plan for disaster. The hippo can get you at any time."

== History ==
The hoax first appeared in 1988; it was reported in the National Lampoon magazine, allegedly sourced from the Las Vegas Sun. National Lampoon claim the dwarf was consumed in front of an audience of 7,000. According to Snopes, the hoax news story began circulating on the internet with a Usenet post in 1994. According to Alex Boese, the story cannot be found in back issues of the Sun, but he also incorrectly claims that it cannot be found in National Lampoon.

The original story was set in an Austrian circus, the hippo was named Hilda, and the dwarf was named Franz Dasch. In 1999, a new version of the story appeared in the Pattaya Mail in Thailand. The setting had changed to northern Thailand and the dwarf was called Od. The Pattaya Mail story was republished by several Australian papers including the Daily Telegraph, the Advertiser, and the Sunday Mail The story reached the UK in the Manchester Evening News.

== In popular culture ==
=== In comedy ===
Karl Pilkington, of The Ricky Gervais Show, once told the story in a segment called "Educating Ricky" in 2002 in which Karl believed the story to be true. This led to both Ricky Gervais and Stephen Merchant laughing hysterically.

Comedian Lewis Black references it in a joke during a stand-up appearance.

Comedy site Funny or Die published a comedic version of the story in 2009.

=== Book ===
A book entitled Hippo Eats Dwarf: A Field Guide to Hoaxes and Other B.S., written by Alex Boese, takes its name from the popular hoax. It was published in 2006.

=== Other ===
The website Museum of Hoaxes includes an entry on the hoax.
