= LSP (rapper) =

Олег Вадимович Савченко LSP Алег Вадзімавіч Саўчанка ЛСП
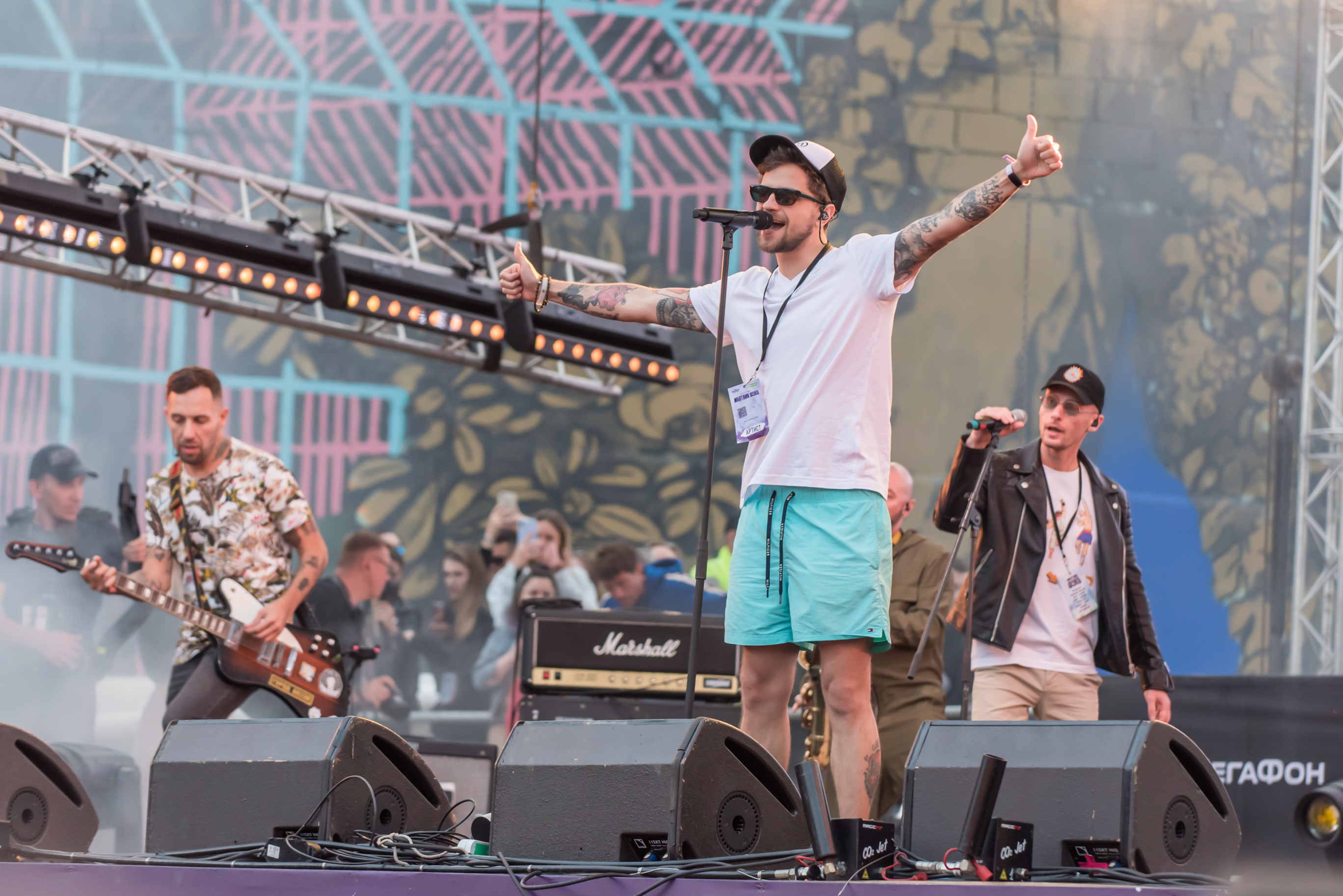
- LSP performed at the «Mayatnik Fuko» festival in St. Petersburg on 7 September 2019

Background information
- Also known as: Олеги 500 • 500 • Sava Lance • oLeG sKy
- Born: 10 July 1989 (age 37); Minsk, Belarus
- Genres: hip-hop • electronic rock • dram 'n' bass • dub • brostep. • indie rock • synthpop • trap • jazz • synth-punk
- Years active: 2007—present
- Label: Atlantic Records Russia Lotus Music
- Website: http://lspofficial.ru/

Oleg Vadimovich Savchenko (Note: Russian: Олег Вадимович Савченко, Belarusian: Але́г Вадзі́мавіч Са́ўчанка; known professionally as LSP (abbreviation of Lil' Stupid Pig; Russian: ЛСП)) (born 10 July 1989), is a Belarusian singer-songwriter and rapper who rose to prominence in the Russian-language hip-hop scene in the 2010s. Initially presented and marketed as a duo project together with Mogilev producer Roman Sashcheko (Russian: Роман Сащеко) better known as Roma Anglichanin (Russian: Рома Англичанин), LSP is principally associated with Oleg Savchenko's vocals and songwriting; Sashcheko acted as the project's primary producer, co-writer and co-author of much of the early material until his death in 2017.

LSP's music combines melodic rap, trap-influenced production and literate, often darkly ironic lyrics; his best known tracks include «Coin» (Russian: «Монетка», romanized: «Monetka») and «Numbers» (Russian: «Номера», romanized: «Nomera»), and notable albums include Tragic City (2017), Magic City (2015) and earlier releases such as the EP (Russian: Видеть цветные сны, romanized: Videt’ tsvetnye sny) (2011).

== Biography ==
Oleg Savchenko was born on 10 July 1989, in Minsk into a family of journalists. While living in Vitebsk, he began studying music as a child after his father hired a piano teacher for him. After a time he gave up formal lessons and started writing his first poems privately.

The first performer whose songs he says he consciously liked was Andrei Gubin. In 2004 he watched the Channel One Russia broadcast of Fabrika Zvyozd 4, in which Timati performed. Later, in 2011, Savchenko would comment on that moment as follows: “Can you imagine what that was like for me at 14?! Rap on Channel One! It meant it was time. It meant I had to f…ing go for it”. Having discovered Russian rap, he became a fan of Detsl and Bad Balance. He later became acquainted with Russian rock and the work of artists and groups such as Zemfira, Nike Borzov, Mumiy Troll and Korol i Shut. However, after some time he returned to rap, beginning to listen to American hip-hop, and from that listening he drew the conclusion that "sound is as important as meaning, and sometimes, perhaps, even more important."

He graduated from the Faculty of Philology at the Minsk State Linguistic University, specialising in the "linguist-teacher" programme. As Savchenko himself recalls, those years were not without financial difficulties, but his parents always supported both him personally and his musical endeavours.

=== 2007–2009: Early recordings and participation in hip-hop battles ===
In 2007, upon turning eighteen, Savchenko released a series of demo recordings, among them his solo mixtape 'Ya Vsyo Ponyal!' («I've Understood It All!») and the compilation album «Here We Come Again».

In 2007–2008, LSP participated in the sixth team battle on hip-hop.ru as a member of the ensemble «ShRec Pro», which advanced to the second round and included the rapper Maks Korzh; he also competed in the eighth official battle on hip-hop.ru, where Savchenko progressed as far as the fourth round.

In the same year, he began composing and recording songs destined for inclusion in the mini-album 'Videt Tsvetnye Sny' («To See Colorful Dreams»). The earliest compositions were tracks such as 'Mag' and 'Ulitsy' («Streets»). Upon encountering Kanye West's album '808s & Heartbreak', Savchenko, profoundly inspired by its innovative sound, committed to tape the initial rendition of the song 'Lambada'; the version ultimately featured on the album was subsequently re-recorded and abridged for concision.

On July 14, 2009, a collaborative mini-album with Deech and Maxie Flow, entitled 'Bez Apellyatsiy' («Without Appeals»), was released, comprising three original tracks, their corresponding instrumental versions, and a bonus track.
