= Drug overdose =

Use of an excessive amount of a drug

- Other names: Overdose, OD, hotshot, wasted, intoxication, gassed, medicinal poisoning
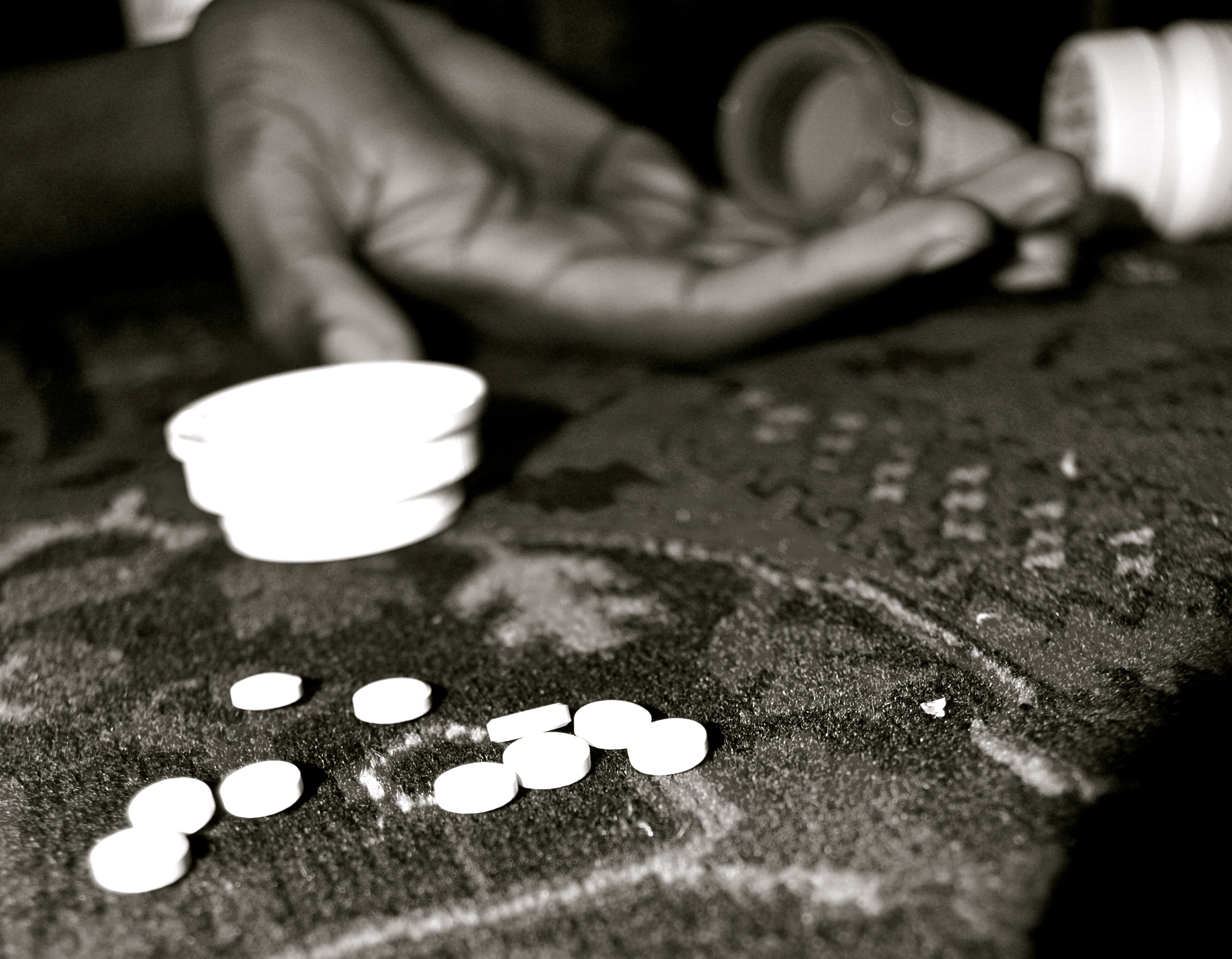
- A photograph depicting a person who had overdosed
- Specialty: Toxicology, emergency medicine
- Symptoms: Vary depending on the drug and the amount used Commonly: Hematemesis, Seizures, Pale skin
- Complications: Neurological damage; Heart failure; Liver failure; Stroke; Coma; Brain death
- Causes: Miscalculation; Misjudgement; Peer pressure; Addiction; Depression; Anxiety; Suicidal ideation; Physical pain; Stress
- Risk factors: Trauma; Physical abuse; Sexual abuse; Child abuse; Bullying; Intravenous drug use
- Differential diagnosis: Pulmonary aspiration; Foreign body aspiration; Heart attack; Epilepsy
- Treatment: Activated charcoal; Stomach pump; Antidotes

A drug overdose (overdose or OD) is the ingestion or application of a drug or other substance in quantities much greater than are recommended. Typically the term is applied for cases when a risk to health is a potential result. An overdose may result in a toxic state or death.

== Classification ==
The word "overdose" implies that there is a common safe dosage and usage for the drug; therefore, the term is commonly applied only to drugs, not poisons, even though many poisons as well are harmless at a low enough dosage. Drug overdose is sometimes used as a means to commit suicide, as the result of intentional or unintentional misuse of medication. Intentional misuse leading to overdose can include using prescribed or non-prescribed drugs in excessive quantities in an attempt to produce euphoria.

Usage of illicit drugs, in large quantities, or after a period of drug abstinence can also induce overdose. Cocaine and opioid users who inject intravenously can easily overdose accidentally, as the margin between a pleasurable drug sensation and an overdose is small. Unintentional misuse can include errors in dosage caused by failure to read or understand product labels. Accidental overdoses may also be the result of over-prescription, failure to recognize a drug's active ingredient or unwitting ingestion by children. A common unintentional overdose in young children involves multivitamins containing iron.

The term 'overdose' is often misused as a descriptor for adverse drug reactions or negative drug interactions due to mixing multiple drugs simultaneously.

== Signs and symptoms ==
Signs and symptoms of an overdose vary depending on the drug, its ingredients, the amount consumed, and exposure to toxins. The symptoms can often be divided into differing toxidromes. This can help one determine what class of drug or toxin is causing the difficulties.

Symptoms of opioid overdoses include slow breathing, heart rate and pulse. Opioid overdoses can also cause pinpoint pupils, and blue lips and nails due to low levels of oxygen in the blood. A person experiencing an opioid overdose might also have muscle spasms, seizures and decreased consciousness. A person experiencing an opiate overdose usually will not wake up, even if their name is called or they are shaken vigorously.

== Causes ==
The drugs or toxins that are most frequently involved in overdose and death (grouped by ICD-10):

- Acute alcohol intoxication (F10)
  - Ethyl alcohol (alcohol)
  - Methanol poisoning
  - Ethylene glycol poisoning
- Opioid overdose (F11)
- Among sedative-hypnotics (F13)
  - Barbiturate overdose (T42.3)
  - Benzodiazepine overdose (T42.4)
  - Uncategorized sedative-hypnotics (T42.6)
    - Ethchlorvynol (Placidyl)
    - GHB
    - Glutethimide (Doriden)
    - Methaqualone
    - Ketamine (T41.2)
- Among stimulants (F14-F15)
  - Cocaine overdose (T40.5)
  - Amphetamine overdose (T43.6)
  - Methamphetamine overdose (T43.6)
- Among tobacco (F17)
  - Nicotine poisoning (T65.2)
- Among poly drug use (F19)
  - Drug "cocktails" (speedballs)
- Medications
  - Aspirin poisoning (T39.0)
  - Paracetamol poisoning (Alone or mixed with oxycodone)
  - Paracetamol toxicity (T39.1)
  - Tricyclic antidepressant overdose (T43.0)
  - Vitamin poisoning
- Pesticide poisoning (T60)
  - Organophosphate poisoning
  - DDT
- Inhalants
- Lithium toxicity

=== Added flavoring ===
Masking undesired taste may impair judgement of the potency, which is a factor in overdosing. For example, lean is usually created as a drinkable mixture, the cough syrup is combined with soft drinks, especially fruit-flavored drinks such as Sprite, Mountain Dew or Fanta, and is typically served in a foam cup. A hard candy, usually a Jolly Rancher, may be added to give the mixture a sweeter flavor.

== Diagnosis ==
The substance that has been taken may often be determined by asking the person. However, if they will not, or cannot, due to an altered level of consciousness, provide this information, a search of the home or questioning of friends and family may be helpful.

Examination for toxidromes, drug testing, or laboratory test may be helpful. Other laboratory test such as glucose, urea and electrolytes, paracetamol levels and salicylate levels are typically done. Negative drug-drug interactions have sometimes been misdiagnosed as an acute drug overdose, occasionally leading to the assumption of suicide.

Toxidromes
Symptoms	Blood Pressure	Heart rate	Respiratory Rate	Temperature	Pupils	Bowel Sounds	Diaphoresis
Anticholinergic	~	up	~	up	dilated	down	down
Cholinergic	~	~	unchanged	unchanged	constricted	up	up
Opioid	down	down	down	down	constricted	down	down
Sympathomimetic	up	up	up	up	dilated	up	up
Sedative-hypnotic	down	down	down	down	~	down	down

== Prevention ==
The distribution of naloxone to injection drug users and other opioid drug users decreases the risk of death from overdose. The Centers for Disease Control and Prevention (CDC) estimates that U.S. programs for drug users and their caregivers prescribing take-home doses of naloxone and training on its utilization are estimated to have prevented 10,000 opioid overdose deaths. Healthcare institution-based naloxone prescription programs have also helped reduce rates of opioid overdose in the U.S. state of North Carolina, and have been replicated in the U.S. military. Nevertheless, scale-up of healthcare-based opioid overdose interventions is limited by providers' insufficient knowledge and negative attitudes towards prescribing take-home naloxone to prevent opioid overdose. Programs training police and fire personnel in opioid overdose response using naloxone have also shown promise in the U.S.

Supervised injection sites (also known as overdose prevention centers) have been used to help prevent drug overdoses by offering opioid reversal medications such as naloxone, medical assistance and treatment options. They also provide clean needles to help prevent the spread of diseases like HIV/AIDS and hepatitis.

== Management ==
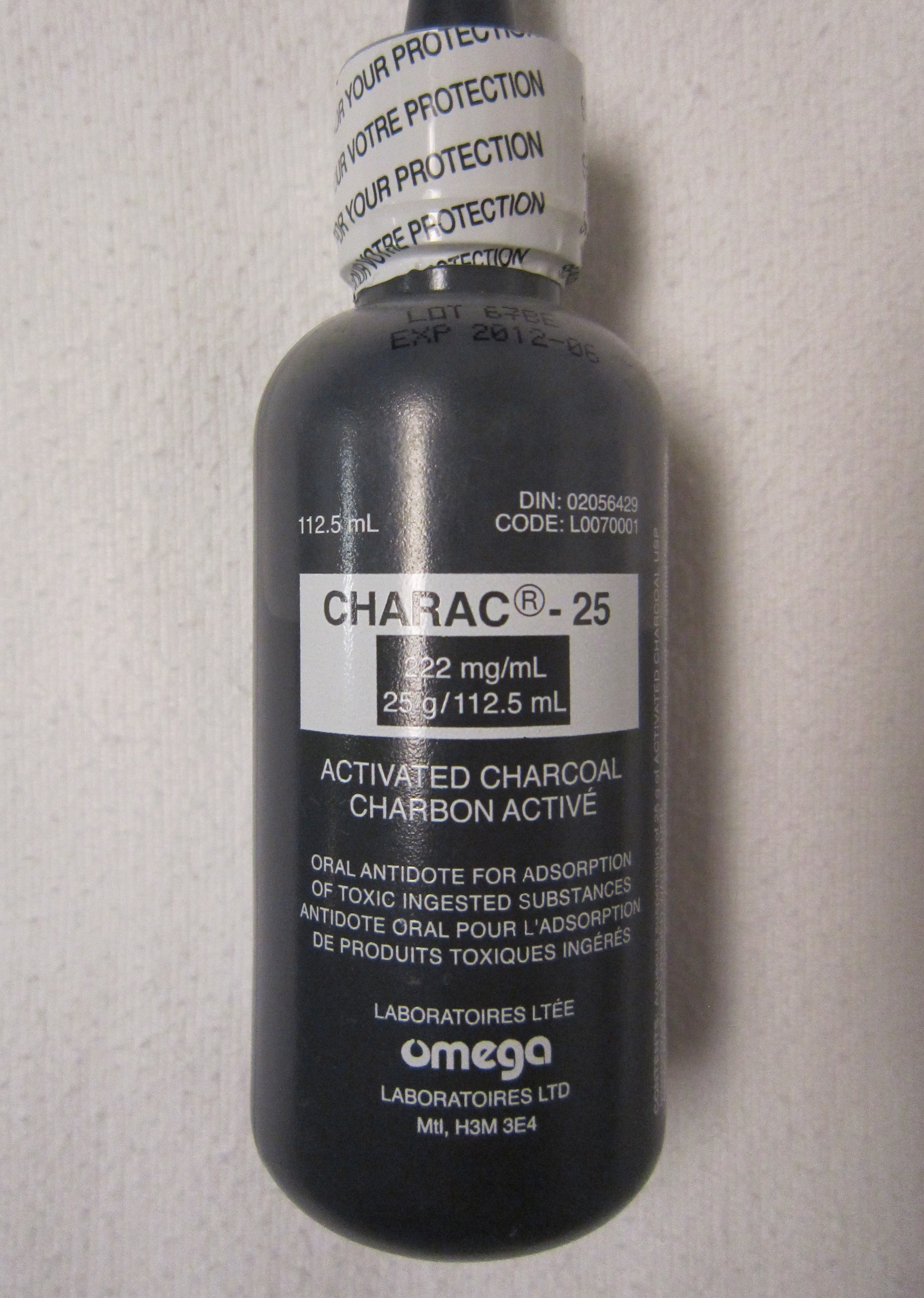
Activated charcoal is a commonly used agent for decontamination of the gastrointestinal tract in overdoses.

Stabilization of the person's airway, breathing, and circulation (ABCs) is the initial treatment of an overdose. Ventilation is considered when there is a low respiratory rate or when blood gases show the person to be hypoxic. Monitoring of the patient should continue before and throughout the treatment process, with particular attention to temperature, pulse, respiratory rate, blood pressure, urine output, electrocardiography (ECG) and O_{2} saturation. Poison control centers and medical toxicologists are available in many areas to provide guidance in overdoses both to physicians and to the general public.

=== Antidotes ===
Specific antidotes are available for certain overdoses. For example, naloxone is the antidote for opiates such as heroin or morphine. Similarly, benzodiazepine overdoses may be effectively reversed with flumazenil. As a nonspecific antidote, activated charcoal is frequently recommended if available within one hour of the ingestion and the ingestion is significant. Gastric lavage, syrup of ipecac, and whole bowel irrigation are rarely used.

== Epidemiology and statistics ==
Bar chart below: Overdose or drug-related death rate per 1 million population (unadjusted), 2022, by country or region.

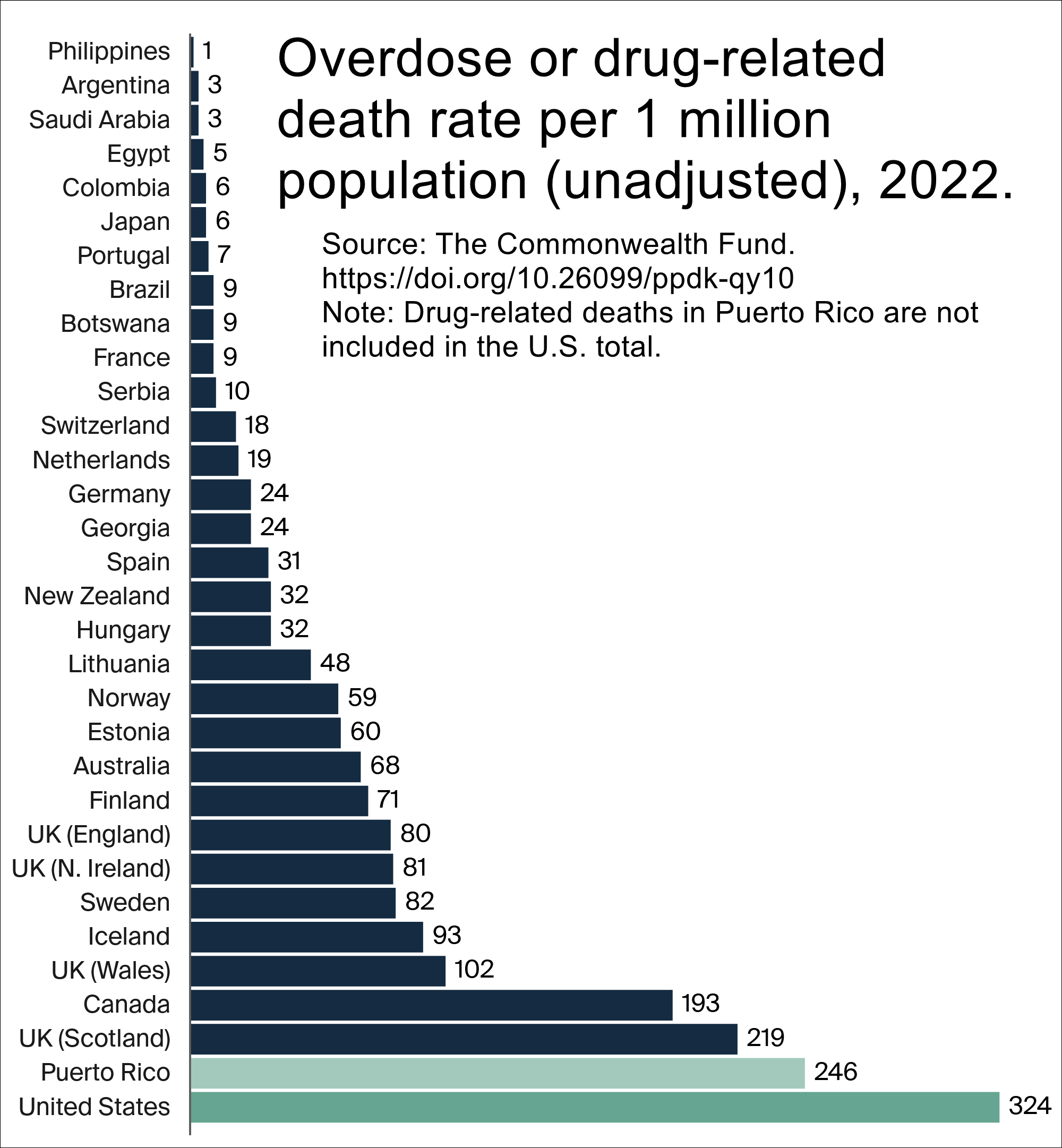

In the US around 77,600 people died in the 12-month period ending March 31, 2025, at a rate of 213 deaths per day. The peak was around 110,900 in 2022. The U.S. drug overdose death rate has gone from 2.5 per 100,000 people in 1968 to the peak rate of 33.2 per 100,000 in 2022.

1,015,060 US residents died from drug overdoses from 1968 to 2019. 22 people out of every 100,000 died from drug overdoses in 2019 in the US. From 1999 to Feb 2019 in the United States, more than 770,000 people have died from drug overdoses. 70,630 people died from drug overdoses in 2019.

The National Center for Health Statistics reports that 19,250 people died of accidental poisoning in the U.S. in the year 2004 (eight deaths per 100,000 population).

In 2008 testimony before a Senate subcommittee, Leonard J. Paulozzi, a medical epidemiologist at the Centers for Disease Control and Prevention said that in 2005 more than 22,000 American people died due to overdoses, and the number is growing rapidly. Paulozzi also testified that all available evidence suggests unintentional overdose deaths are related to the increasing use of prescription drugs, especially opioid painkillers. However, the vast majority of overdoses are also attributable to alcohol. It is very rare for a victim of an overdose to have consumed just one drug. Most overdoses occur when drugs are ingested in combination with alcohol.

Drug overdose was the leading cause of injury death in 2013. Among people 25 to 64 years old, drug overdose caused more deaths than motor vehicle traffic crashes. There were 43,982 drug overdose deaths in the United States in 2013. Of these, 22,767 (51.8%) were related to prescription drugs.

The 22,767 deaths relating to prescription drug overdose in 2013, 16,235 (71.3%) involved opioid painkillers, and 6,973 (30.6%) involved benzodiazepines. Drug misuse and abuse caused about 2.5 million emergency department (ED) visits in 2011. Of these, more than 1.4 million ED visits were related to prescription drugs. Among those ED visits, 501,207 visits were related to anti-anxiety and insomnia medications, and 420,040 visits were related to opioid analgesics.

New CDC data in 2024 demonstrates U.S. drug overdose deaths have significantly declined, marking the potential for the first year with fewer than 100,000 fatalities since 2020. The CDC data shows a nearly 17% drop in reported overdose deaths during the 12 months ending in June, totaling 93,087. This is a notable decrease from the 111,615 deaths recorded in the same period ending in June 2023. While the opioid crisis continues to take a heavy toll, fentanyl remains a major driver, contributing to the majority of these fatalities.

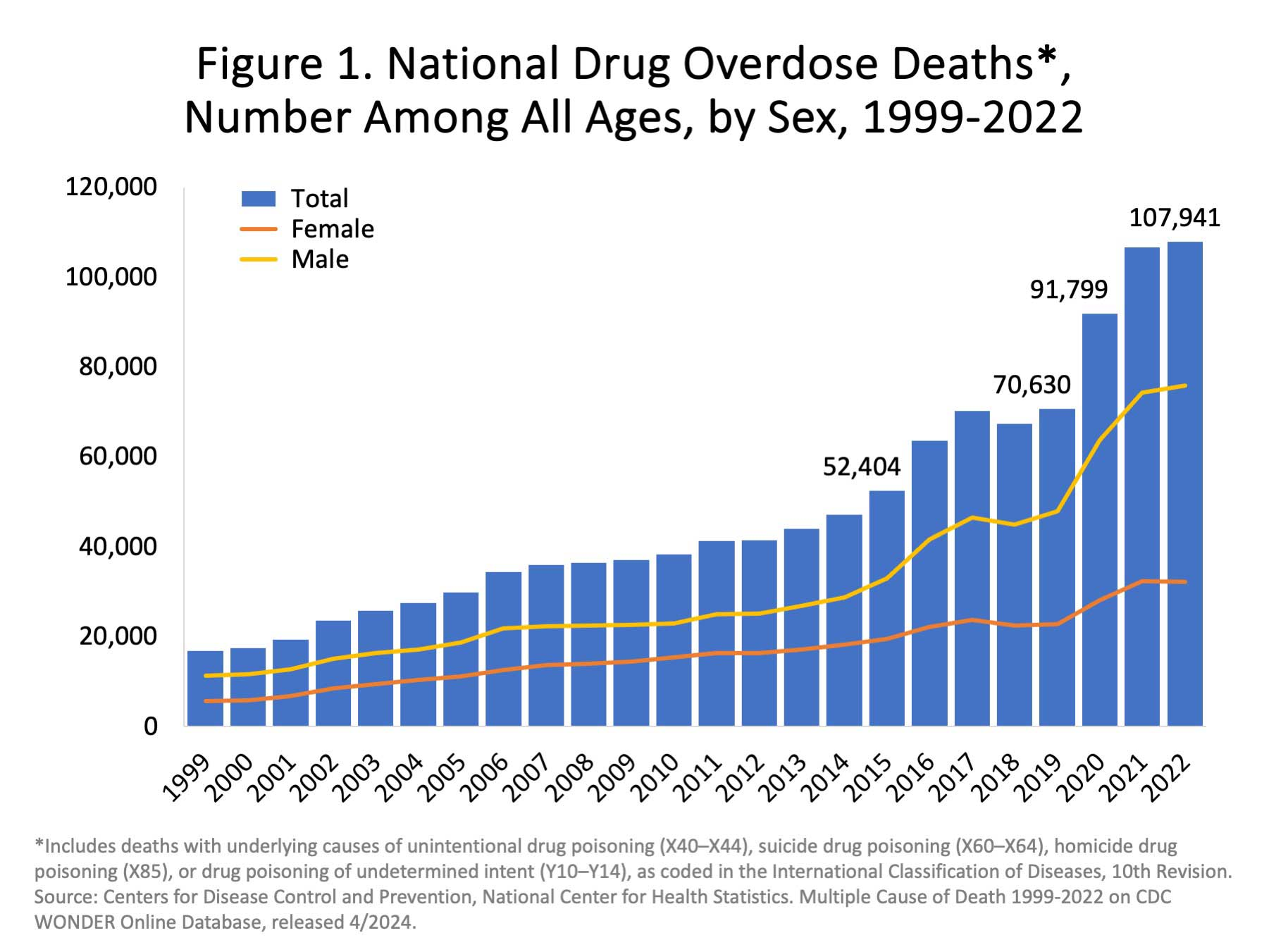
U.S. yearly overdose deaths from all drugs.

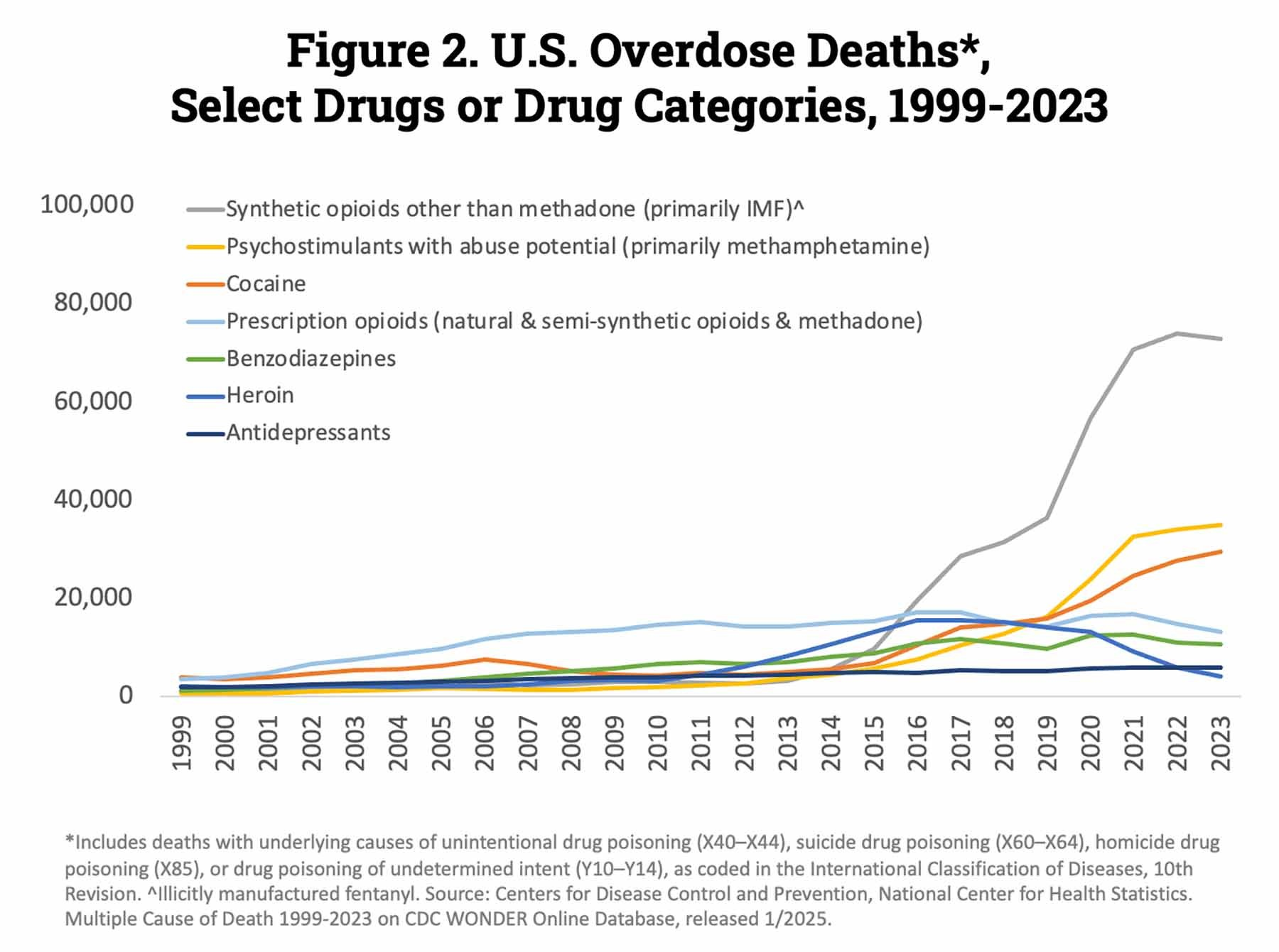
US yearly overdose deaths, and the drugs involved. Among the 70,200 deaths in 2017, the sharpest increase occurred among deaths related to fentanyl and fentanyl analogs (synthetic opioids) with 28,466 deaths.

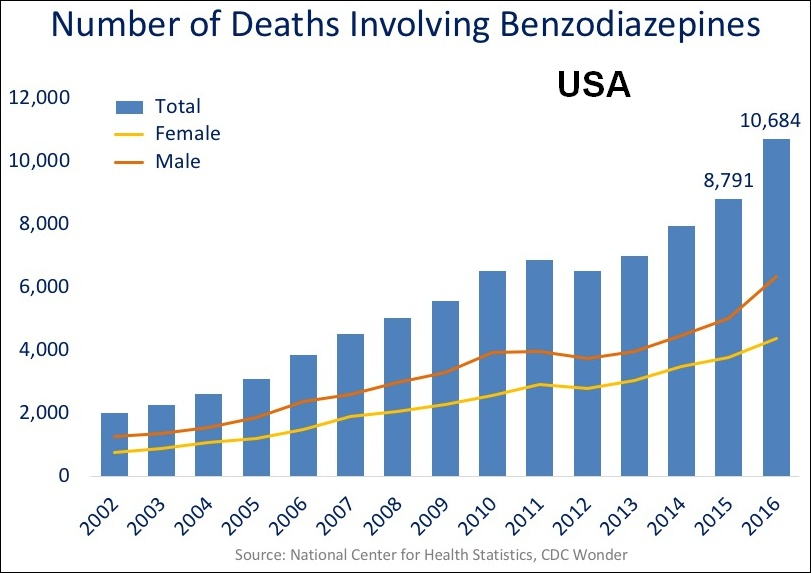
U.S. yearly overdose deaths involving benzodiazepines.

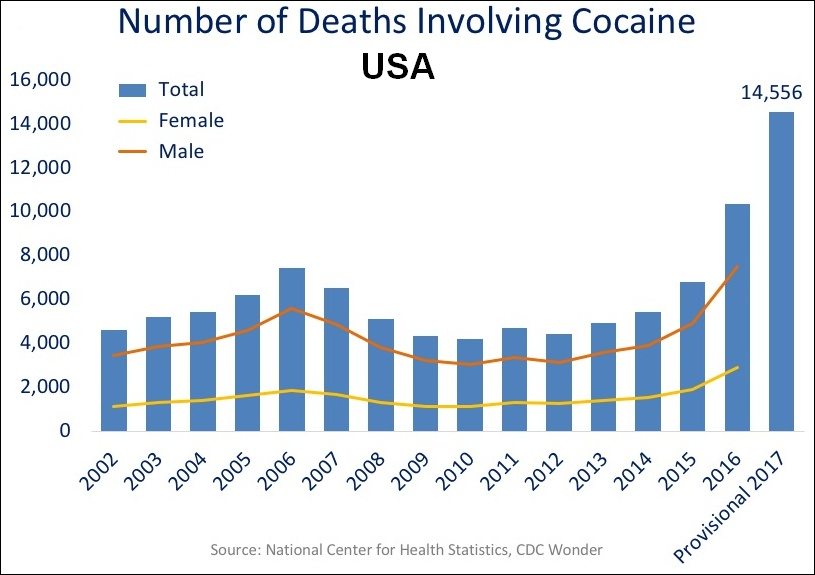
U.S. yearly overdose deaths involving cocaine.

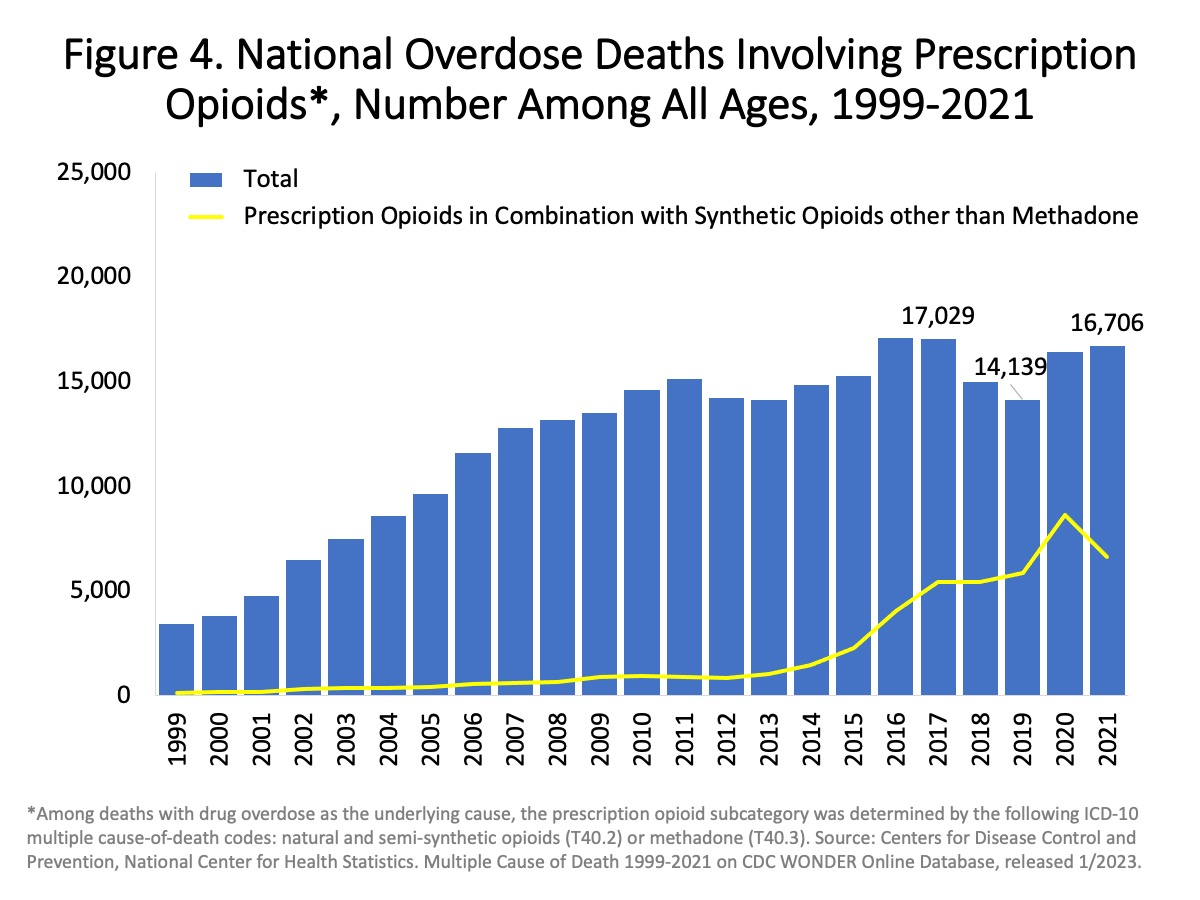
U.S. yearly deaths involving prescription opioids. Non-methadone synthetics is a category dominated by illegally acquired fentanyl, and has been excluded.

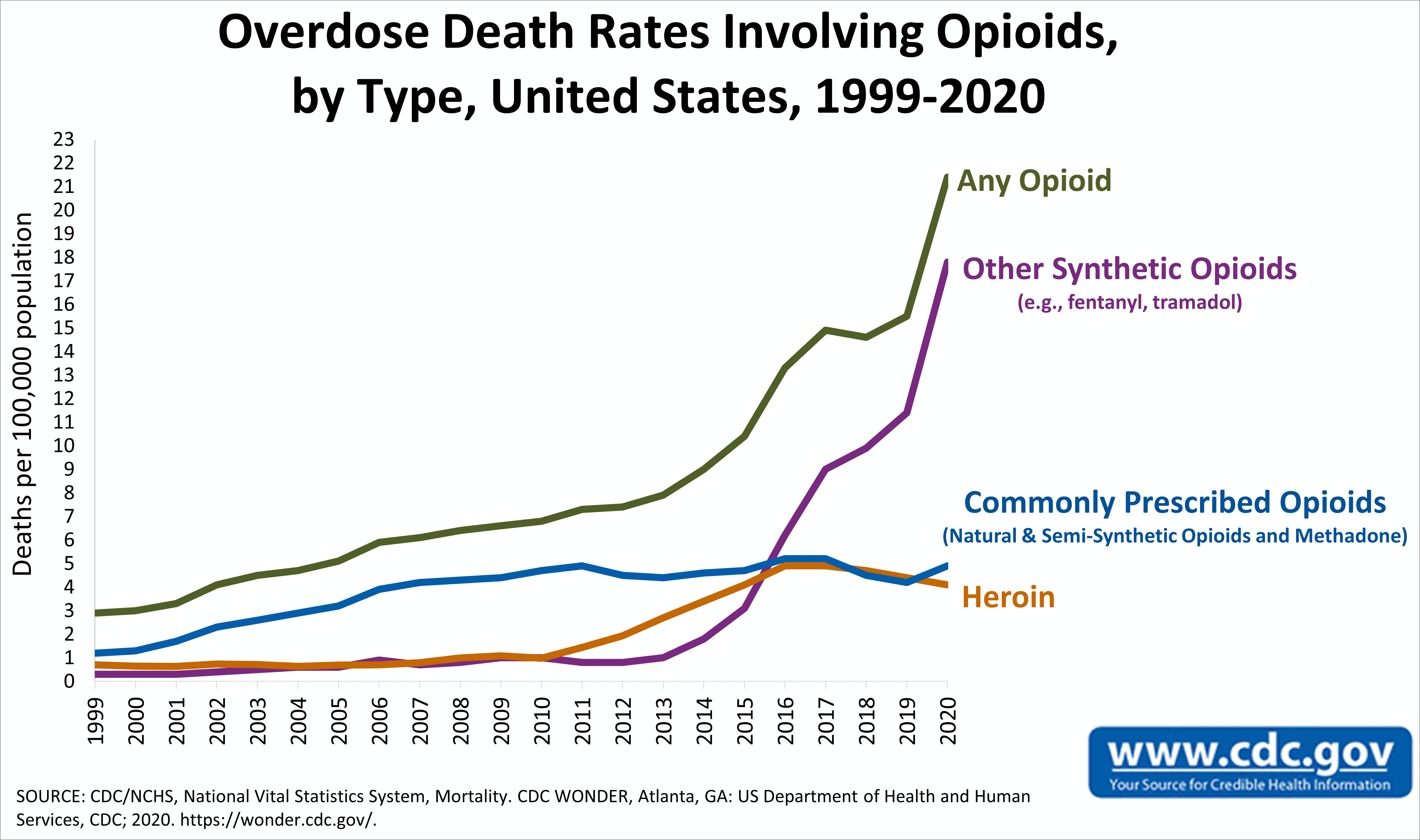
U.S. overdose deaths involving all opioids. Deaths per 100,000 population.

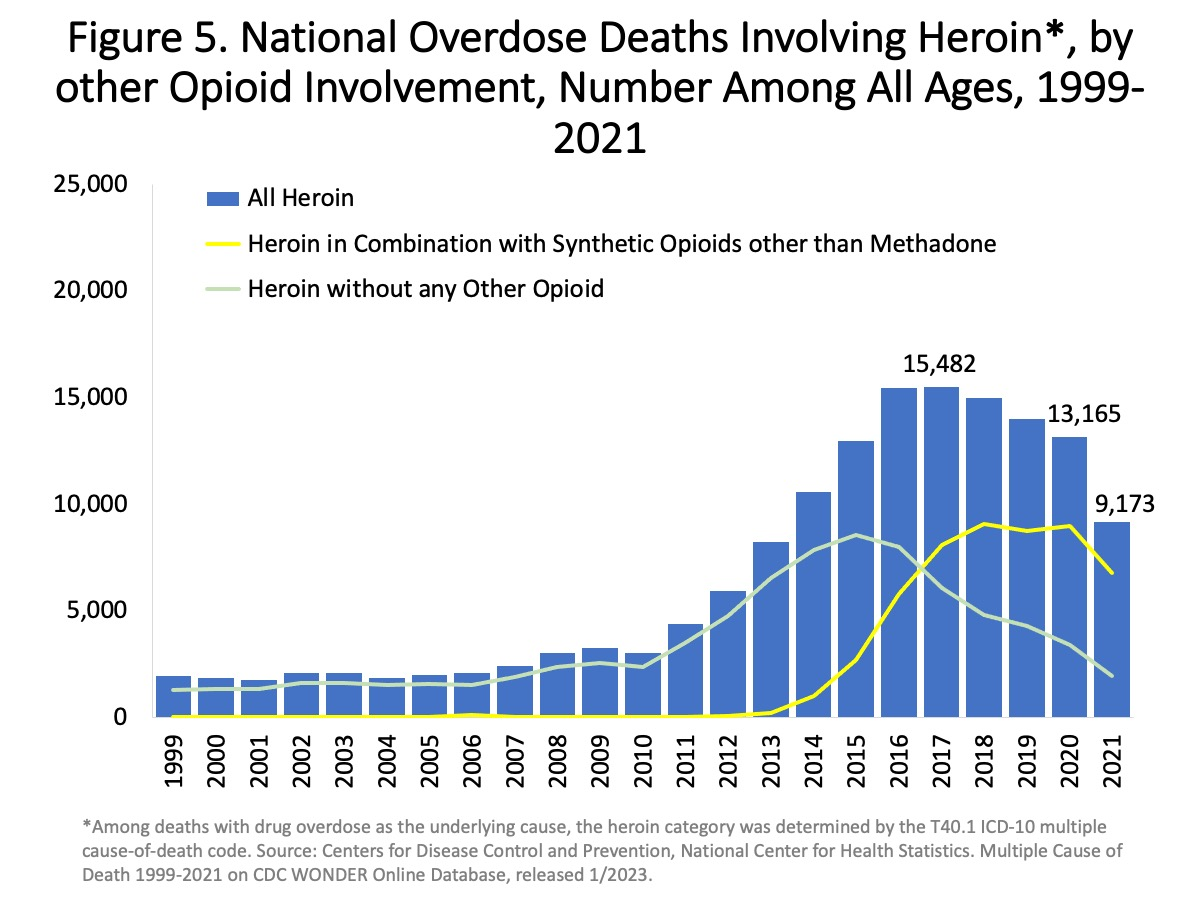
U.S. yearly overdose deaths involving heroin.

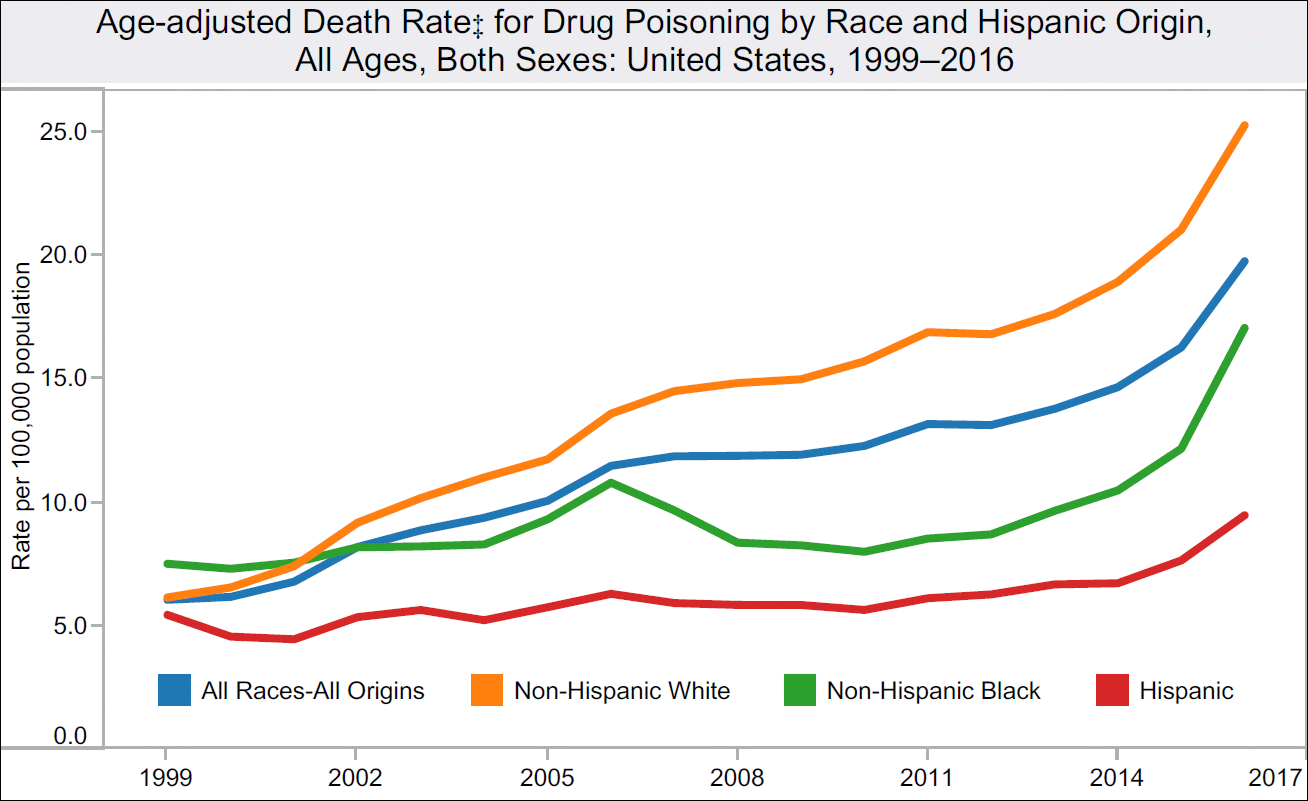
Timeline of US drug overdose death rates by race and ethnicity. Rate per 100,000 population.

== See also ==
- 27 Club – Notional club occupied by those who died at age 27
- Adulterants – Substance that has been secretly added
- Brandon Vedas – 2003 drug overdose death
- Drug checking – Harm reduction technique
- Drug interactions – Change in the action or side effects of a drug caused
- Hepatotoxicity – Liver damage caused by a drug or chemical
- List of deaths from drug overdose and intoxication
- List of investigational substance-related disorder drugs
- Reagent testing – Tests for authentication of psychoactive drugs, and detection of adulterants
- Responsible drug use – Use of drugs in a responsible manner
- Suicide methods § Drug overdose
- Water intoxication – Potentially fatal overhydration
