= Livestreamed suicide =

Suicide committed during a livestream

Livestreamed suicide is an internet phenomenon that occurs when a person deliberately broadcasts their suicide through a live stream via online platforms such as social media or video hosting sites in real time to an audience of viewers.

Livestreamed suicide broadcasts have become a new public health problem in many countries. Regular users are often the first to witness such suicides and react to them. The lack of instant moderation, the nature of distribution algorithms, and delays in moderation responses make live streams particularly vulnerable to prolonged exposure to harmful content, often traumatizing relatives and viewers.

== History ==
One well known case of a suicide livestream was broadcast in 2008, when 19-year-old Abraham K. Biggs from Florida wrote several times on an online bodybuilding forum that he was planning to kill himself. Finally, he posted a link to the live-streaming site Justin.tv, where a video was shown of him killing himself with an overdose of prescription drugs. According to ABC News, some bloggers who caught the live broadcast egged him on while he was in the act.

High-profile incidents began to emerge as early as the 2010s. In 2016, The Guardian reported that a young woman's suicide had been broadcast on Periscope in France, prompting an investigation by law enforcement agencies and public outcry.

A study on the use of social media to express suicidal thoughts/actions in Bangladesh reported 19 cases of suicide after announcements on social media, two of which were livestreamed. Between 2003 and 2016, at least 193 similar incidents were recorded in China. Most of them occurred on social media.

== Reasons ==
Such cases highlight the interconnected nature of real-time digital platforms, which allow stories about suicides to become popular and details to develop due to public participation and the spread of information. Live streaming can be seen by the author as a way to perceivably "get through", ask for help, or "leave a last message". The Centre for Suicide Prevention notes that a 35-year-old man from China broadcast his hanging live, likely to send a message to his loved ones, who may have wanted to see him in his last moments, and to explain his state of mind without words.

In 2017, The Washington Post reported on a 12-year-old girl who died by suicide in live broadcast, citing sexual abuse by a relative as the reason for her actions.

== Consequences ==
World Health Organization notes that there is evidence that media reports of suicide can either strengthen or weaken suicide prevention efforts. Widespread stories about deaths by suicide are often followed by an increase in suicides among the population, while stories about overcoming suicidal crises can lead to a decrease in suicides.

Studies note the Werther effect, an increase in copycat suicides following media or public coverage of suicide. In the modern context of social media, evidence suggests that there is a risk of imitation, especially if the content is dramatized or the methods are described in detail. Direct depictions of death increase the risk of acute trauma, flashbacks, and mental health deterioration in vulnerable groups.

== Notable cases ==
=== Russia ===
Suicide of Gleb Korablyov: On 17 October 2019 in Moscow, an 18-year-old student named Gleb Korablyov died by suicide while broadcasting the event on his VKontakte page. He raised a Saiga-12K carbine to his head, and shouted the phrase "Ня, пока!" (Nya, bye!) used online by another teenager, Renata Kambolina, who had similarly died by suicide. Two and a half hours later, police officers arrived at the apartment and turned off the camera. The video was uploaded to YouTube on the 19th of October under the title "Video 1444", and stayed up for three days before being taken down. At the time of its takedown, it had ~150,000 views. The video was then subsequently reuploaded to various social media platforms, bearing the "1444" name, throughout late 2019.

On 13 September 2021 in Zelenograd, during a live broadcast, a 17-year-old girl died by suicide while listening to the song "Numbers" by the singer LSP. Footage that appeared online shows the girl sitting on the edge of a balcony railing listening to the song, then falling down. On 19 September, her act was repeated by a 19-year-old man from Krasnodar, who also listened to this song before dying by suicide. After the incident, the singer members decided to remove the song from streaming platforms. When searching for the song, TikTok began redirecting users to a psychological help hotline and providing recommendations on how to cope during difficult times.

=== Ukraine ===
On the afternoon of 2 October 2023, a double suicide occurred in Kyiv. An 18-year-old, Volodymyr "Vova" Polyvach, and his 17-year-old foster sister, Viktoria "Vika" Polyvach, jumped from a 24th-floor balcony while livestreaming on TikTok. Before dying by suicide, they had posted dozens of videos on their Telegram channel.

=== United States ===
Suicide of Katelyn Nicole Davis: On 30 December 2016, 12-year-old Katelyn Nicole Davis hung herself on a tree during a livestream in Cedartown, Georgia. The video spread across social networks.

Suicide of Ronnie McNutt: On 31 August 2020, 33-year-old American Ronald Merle McNutt died by suicide during a Facebook Live broadcast. This incident became one of the most widely discussed cases of livestreamed suicide in the media. After this incident, public and researcher attention focused on the work of platform moderation and how videos are distributed further.

=== Japan ===
On 24 November 2013, a 14-year-old girl known as Rorochan_1999 took her own life during a livestream by jumping from the balcony of her apartment building. In 2020, the Japanese band Shinsei Kamattechan released the song “Ruru's Suicide Show on a Livestream”, inspired by the events of the livestream.

=== United Kingdom ===
Suicide of Kevin Whitrick: On 21 March 2007, Kevin Neil Witrick, a British electrical engineer, died by suicide by hanging himself while in an online chat room.

=== South Korea ===
On 5 August 2026, 26-year-old Japanese woman, Mina Chan, a fan of the Korean-pop boygroup ENHYPEN, died by suicide in her apartment in Seoul, South Korea while on a TikTok livestream after experiencing cyberbullying on X.

== See also ==
- Trash stream
- Livestreamed crime
- Copycat suicide
- Live television suicide
