= Nomera =

Song by Oleg Savchenko

from the album YOP
- Released: May 24, 2012
- Genre: Indie rock; drum and bass
- Length: 3:59
- Label: Studiya «Souz»
- Producer: Roma Anglichanin

Oleg Savchenko singles chronology
"Bolshe Deneg" (2014)	"Nomera" (2012)	"Siti" (2014)

"Nomera" (English: Numbers) is a song by the Belarusian musical group LSP, released on 24 May 2012. It is the first fully realized collaborative work between Oleg LSP (Russian: Олег ЛСП) and Roma Anglichanin (Russian: Рома Англичанин). The track was included in the album YOP (Russian: ЁП) (2014).

On 19 September 2021, the band's manager, Dmitry Magadov, announced that the song had been removed from all music platforms. The reason for this decision was a series of incidents involving the suicides of teenagers during live broadcasts in which the band's song was playing in the background.

== Blocking in Russia ==
=== "Nomera" ===
On 14 May 2018, a post appeared in LSP's official VKontakte community stating that the song "Nomera" had been blocked on VKontakte within the territory of the Russian Federation. "It has been deemed prohibited on the basis of a decision by the Federal Service for Surveillance on Consumer Rights Protection and Human Well-Being dated 28 April 2018, No. 45668."

Excerpt: "…The lyrics of the song contain a description of a method of committing suicide…".

Following its blocking on VKontakte in Russia, the track rose to third place in the Russian iTunes chart.

=== "Monetka" ===
In August 2018, the music video for "Monetka" was blocked on YouTube within the territory of the Russian Federation at the request of Roskomnadzor, for the same reasons as "Nomera".
