= Manuel Otto =

German game developer (1996–2026)

- Otto in 2016
- Born: Marc-Manuel Alexander Otto; 18 July 1996; Germany
- Died: 20 October 2026 (aged 30); Breitbrunn am Chiemsee, Bavaria, Germany
- Cause of death: Fire
- Occupation: Video game developer
- Notable work: Stick Run

Marc-Manuel Alexander Otto (18 July 1996 – 20 October 2026) was a German video game developer known for being the developer of the Flash game Stick Run, which was released on Facebook in 2010.

== Life and career ==
Otto, a self-taught developer, released the game Stick Run on Facebook in 2010 when he was a 14-year-old high school student. After a short time, the game achieved a high monthly number of players. He founded a company together with his father and had the name and logo of the game protected. In cooperation with a Russian publisher, Stick Run was ported to iOS and Android devices.

On 20 October 2026, Otto died in a fire in his attic apartment during a livestream, apparently by suicide. He was 30 years old.

== Stick Run ==
Stick Run
- Developer: Manuel Otto
- Publishers: Nekki (iOS, Android)
- Engine: Adobe Flash
- Platforms: Browser; iOS; Android
- Release: August 2010
- Genre: Endless runner
- Modes: Single-player, multiplayer

Stick Run is an endless runner Flash game that can accommodate up to four players. It was released on Facebook in August 2010 and Android/iOS in the summer of 2013 in cooperation with Russian publisher Nekki. It attained over 43 million total users worldwide, making it one of the most popular games available on Facebook.
