= Suicide of Kevin Whitrick =

2007 suicide of British electrical engineer in online chat room

Kevin Whitrick
- Born: Kevin Neil Whitrick; 17 August 1964; Shrewsbury, Shropshire, England
- Died: 21 March 2007 (aged 42); Wellington, Shropshire, England
- Cause of death: Suicide by hanging
- Occupation: Electrical engineer
- Spouse: Paula Whitrick (m. 1988; sep. 2005)
- Children: 2

Kevin Neil Whitrick (17 August 1964 – 21 March 2007) was a British electrical engineer who committed suicide by hanging himself while in an online chat room.

== Background ==
Whitrick had been married to his wife Paula since 1988, and they had two children. The marriage had broken down about two years prior to his death, and he was living separately from his family. In 2006, Whitrick was severely injured in a car accident and suffered long-term health consequences.

== Suicide ==
In March 2007, Whitrick was using the Paltalk video chat service, in a special "insult" chatroom with about 60 other users where people "have a go at each other". He stood on a chair, punched a hole in his ceiling and placed a rope around a joist, then tied the other end around his neck and stepped off the chair in order to asphyxiate himself. Some people thought this was a prank, until his face started turning blue. Some people in the chat room encouraged him by saying things like "just get on with it", while others tried desperately to find his address. A member in the room contacted the police, who arrived at the scene two minutes later. Whitrick was pronounced dead at 11:15 pm GMT.

== Aftermath ==
The death was widely reported in the media. Concerns were raised over the possibility that it could inspire further suicides, as well as the webcam footage becoming available in perpetuity on the internet. Detectives traced about 100 chatroom users to question them about their role in the suicide, though the Crown Prosecution Service did not pursue any criminal charges against them.

== See also ==
- Abraham Biggs
- Suicide of Ronnie McNutt
- Livestreamed suicide
