= 90 Day Jane =

2008 suicide blog hoax

90 Day Jane was a blog and hoax published in 2008 by an anonymous woman, known as Jane, who promised to die by suicide 90 days after launching the blog, with the tagline "I'm Going to Kill Myself in 90 Days". Her blog posts chronicled her life in the days leading up to her ostensibly planned suicide and asked its readers to help her pick a method for killing herself, citing Christine Chubbuck and R. Budd Dwyer as inspirations for her publicizing her suicide. The comments on the blog ranged from sympathetic to negative, with NPR's Laura Conaway writing that "some of them [are] showing the worst— really, the worst— in human beings." Suicide prevention advocates frowned upon 90 Day Jane, fearing that it would encourage others to emulate her behavior. In February 2008, she revealed that the blog was started as an art project meant for a small group of her friends and that she did not actually plan on taking her life; she took down the blog soon after.
