= Suicide of Ronnie McNutt =

2020 livestreamed suicide in Mississippi, U.S.

Ronnie McNutt
- McNutt during a live broadcast shortly before his suicide
- Born: Ronald Merle McNutt; May 23, 1987; Alcorn, Mississippi, U.S.
- Died: August 31, 2020 (aged 33); New Albany, Mississippi, U.S.
- Cause of death: Suicide by gunshot
- Resting place: Snowdown Church of Christ Cemetery
- Other name: Hinderless (username online)
- Occupations: Veteran of the United States Army Reserve; Toyota Plant Worker
- Known for: Suicide during Facebook livestream

Ronald Merle McNutt (May 23, 1987 – August 31, 2020) was an American US Army Reserve veteran from New Albany, Mississippi, who on August 31, 2020, committed suicide during a Facebook livestream. The clip of McNutt's suicide spread virally across social media sites, which led to discussions on suicide and the Internet and if social media platforms have a legal obligation to remove graphic and disturbing footage.

== Life and career ==
Born on May 23, 1987, in the community of Alcorn, Mississippi, McNutt was a resident of New Albany, Mississippi, and had served in the United States Army Reserve, including in Iraq. He worked at a Toyota plant. He had a variety of mental health problems, such as depression as well as post-traumatic stress disorder (PTSD), the latter of which was a direct consequence of his time served in the Iraq War in 2007 and 2008. Some reports also said that he lost his job during the COVID-19 pandemic, though Rolling Stone disputed this. McNutt was a Christian who regularly attended church.

== Suicide ==
On August 31, 2020, McNutt began a livestream on Facebook Live. His best friend, Joshua Steen, noticed the stream. He told Rolling Stone that McNutt "often used a livestreaming platform as his form of therapy", regularly conversing with viewers on various topics; but he noticed almost immediately that this particular livestream was "different" from the others, as McNutt "appeared to be heavily inebriated and despondent", and appeared to misfire a rifle into the air at one point. Steen claimed that he attempted to intervene numerous times – particularly when McNutt misfired the rifle – hoping that Facebook would cut off the stream and end the video feed, preventing people from seeing into McNutt's home while Steen sought police intervention. Facebook refused to cut the stream, claiming that the stream was not in any violation of its platform's guidelines, as McNutt had not yet killed himself.

As the stream went on, McNutt's cell phone rang frequently. The last call he received was from his girlfriend, which he answered, leading to a brief argument between the two. After she ended the call, McNutt took hold of the gun and addressed the audience for the final time, saying his last words: "Hey guys, I guess that's it." He then aimed the rifle under his chin and fatally shot himself. About a second before his suicide, the phone he had left on his desk began to ring again. The stream was captured by multiple viewers. The New Albany Police Department had been called to the scene during the livestream, but did not enter McNutt's apartment until after they heard the fatal gunshot; his phone was still ringing as officers searched the scene. Police Chief Chris Robertson reported that his officers had secured the perimeter and evacuated nearby residents before attempting to communicate with McNutt via speakerphone, to no avail. Robertson concluded that McNutt was "in such a mental state nobody could've gotten through to him".

McNutt made a final post on Facebook shortly before starting the livestream. It read, "Someone in your life needs to hear that they matter. That they are loved. That they have a future. Be the one to tell them." Two days after his suicide, McNutt was buried in Snowdown Church of Christ Cemetery in Prentiss County, Mississippi.

== Aftermath ==
=== Viral spread ===
Screencasts and downloads of the livestream were posted online, beginning its proliferation on the web. The video of McNutt's suicide was posted by users across social media platforms such as Facebook, YouTube, TikTok, and Instagram, often in the form of bait-and-switch content which would unexpectedly display the video alongside innocuous content. Variants of the video appeared in TikTok's "For you" page, so that users would scroll upon it without warning as the suicide automatically played, with the apparent intention of frightening or upsetting viewers as a form of trolling. The #ronniemcnutt hashtag had 15.6 million views on TikTok within the first few days after the suicide.

According to Heavy, Facebook also initially refused to prevent the spread of recorded video of McNutt's misfire and suicide, but later agreed to remove the videos from its platform. McNutt had not expressed any intent for the viral spread to occur; Steen said that he did not think McNutt started livestreaming with the intention of killing himself, adding: "When you go back and follow his digital trail there is this beautiful telling of his life on various social-media platforms. He had a history of getting on a streaming service and talking."

Though the platforms worked to remove the videos, new uploads of it would appear from separate accounts, while links to the video also began to appear in Reddit's true crime communities. As TikTok's moderation became aware of the video with its algorithms, uploaders evaded detection by placing the video after unrelated, innocuous imagery.

=== Public response ===
The incident was compared to the filmed suicides of television news reporter Christine Chubbuck and treasurer of Pennsylvania R. Budd Dwyer. A large margin of the response online was one of sympathy towards McNutt, with users using the case as an opportunity to discuss mental health and suicide prevention, as well as concern over the video's prevalence online. Some TikTok users announced boycotts of the platform until the suicide video was completely taken down, while other users began posting prayers and messages of respect and commemoration for McNutt in the comments sections of the video uploads.

Many parents reported that their children were highly distressed after encountering the video, with one girl becoming physically ill and needing to sleep with the lights on. Another parent argued that she fears that her children, who accidentally discovered the video on TikTok, may have post-traumatic stress disorder. Institute of Mums circulated further warnings for parents about seemingly benign video content hiding the McNutt video, stating, "Alarmingly, there are also reports of the video being sandwiched in the middle of cute and funny cat videos, which begin with viewer-friendly footage before quickly changing to the disturbing suicide." The then-Prime Minister of Australia Scott Morrison referred to the video as something that "no child should be exposed to", while cybersecurity expert Susan McLean publicly recommended that parents prevent minor children from accessing the TikTok app until the video was fully removed.

=== Liability ===
The case sparked a debate over what legal liability is owed by Internet platforms that fail to promptly remove graphic and disturbing footage from public view, with the blame generally being placed on Facebook for failing to cut off the livestream during the initial suicide attempt. Joshua Steen, and many of McNutt's other friends, say they had reported the livestream to Facebook "hundreds" of times prior to McNutt's death; Steen had also called Facebook multiple times, and had called the police, neither of which stopped the stream before McNutt killed himself. Steen declared, "if some woman posts a topless photo, their software will detect that, remove it, and ban their account. That's apparently more offensive than my friend killing himself." Theo Bertram, TikTok's European director of public policy, stated that "a coordinated raid from the dark web" was responsible for ongoing circulation of the video.

TikTok released a public statement saying, "Our systems have been automatically detecting and flagging these clips for violating our policies against content that displays, praises, glorifies, or promotes suicide. We appreciate our community members who've reported content and warned others against watching, engaging or sharing such videos on any platform, out of respect for the person and their family". Facebook, likewise, publicly stated, "We removed the original video from Facebook last month, on the day it was streamed, and have used automation technology to remove copies and uploads since that time. Our thoughts remain with Ronnie's family and friends during this difficult time".
