= List of Elle Fanning performances =

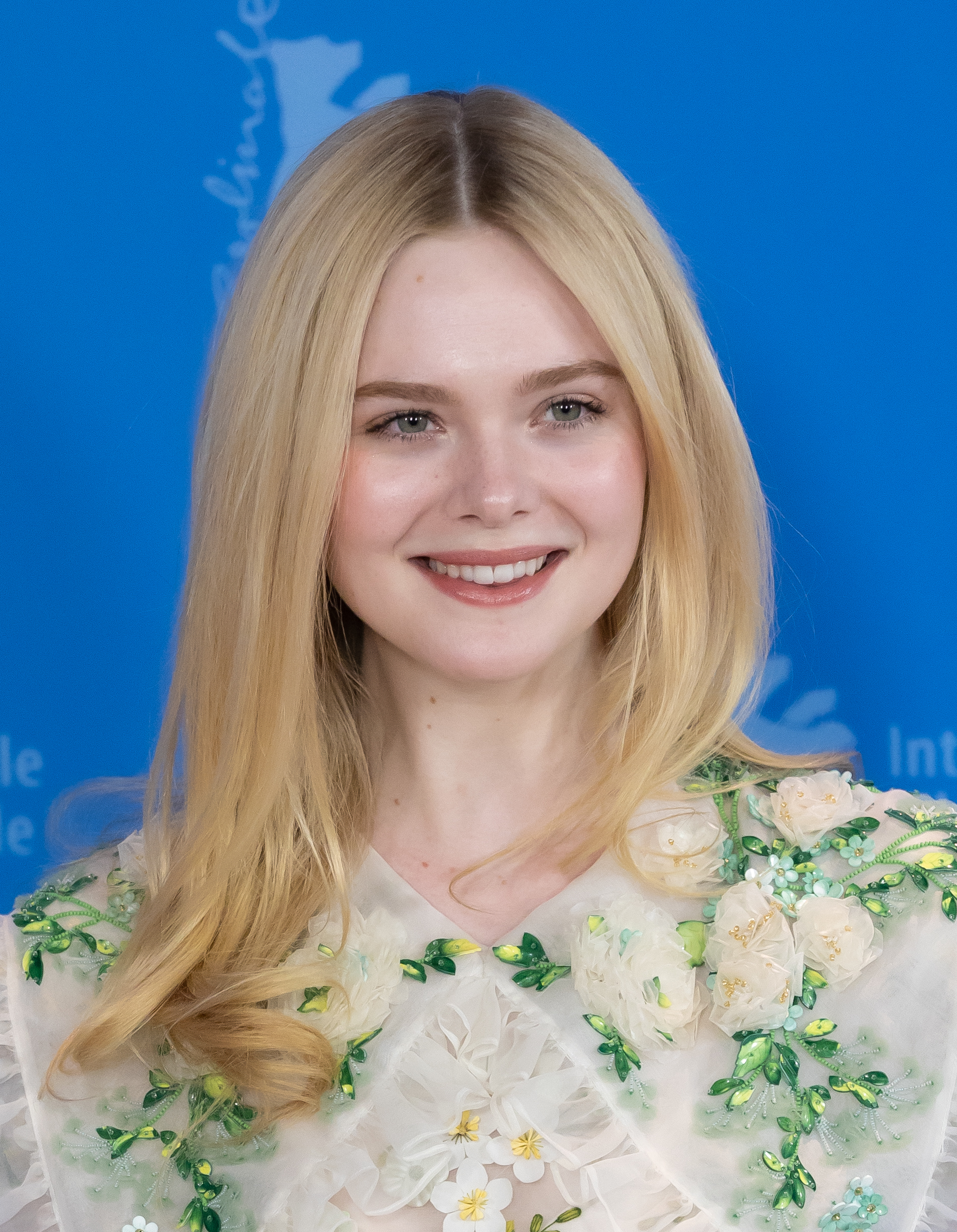
Fanning at the Berlinale in 2020

Elle Fanning is an American actress known for her roles on stage and screen. She started her career as a child actor in 2001 before transitioning to mature leading roles. She has acted across genres ranging from Hollywood blockbusters to Independent dramas.

Fanning made her film debut in the child custody drama I Am Sam (2001), before taking roles in the family comedy Daddy Day Care (2003), the family comedy-drama Because of Winn-Dixie (2005), the psychological drama Babel (2006), and the fantasy romance drama The Curious Case of Benjamin Button (2008). She was able to transition into leading roles acting in the Sofia Coppola drama Somewhere (2010), the J.J. Abrams science-fiction thriller Super 8 (2011) and the Sally Potter the coming-of-age drama Ginger & Rosa (2012). She then gained a wider audience portraying Princess Aurora in the Walt Disney Studio fantasy film Maleficent (2014) and its sequel Maleficent: Mistress of Evil (2019).

She has focused her career on independent films such as the historical drama Trumbo (2015), the psychological horror film The Neon Demon (2016), the coming-of-age dramedy 20th Century Women (2016), the science-fiction romance How to Talk to Girls at Parties (2017), the Southern Gothic thriller The Beguiled (2017), the gangster drama Live by Night (2019), the musical drama Teen Spirit (2018), the romantic comedy A Rainy Day in New York (2019), and the teen romance All the Bright Places (2020), the later of which she also served as a producer. She portrayed Mary Shelley in the period drama Mary Shelley (2017), and Sylvie Russo in the Bob Dylan biopic A Complete Unknown (2024).

On television, she portrayed Catherine the Great in the FX on Hulu satirical period dramedy The Great (2020–2023) and Michelle Carter in the Hulu crime miniseries The Girl from Plainville (2022). She also acted in the supernatural miniseries The Lost Room (2006). On stage, she made her Broadway playing a hippie in the Branden Jacobs-Jenkins family drama play Appropriate (2023) and portrayed the character Tomorrow in the video-game Death Stranding 2: On the Beach (2025).

== Acting credits ==
=== Film ===
Key
| † | Denotes films that have not yet been released |

| Year | Title | Role | Notes | Ref. |
|---|---|---|---|---|
| 2001 | I Am Sam | Young Lucy Dawson | | |
| 2003 | Daddy Day Care | Jamie | | |
| 2004 | The Door in the Floor | Ruth Cole | | |
| 2005 | Because of Winn-Dixie | Sweetie Pie Thomas | | |
| 2005 | My Neighbor Totoro | Mei Kusakabe | Voice; English dub | |
| 2005 | P.N.O.K. | Rebecca Bullard | Short film | |
| 2006 | Déjà Vu | Abbey | | |
| 2006 | Babel | Debbie Jones | | |
| 2006 | I Want Someone to Eat Cheese With | Penelope | | |
| 2006 | Charlotte's Web | Girl In The Panda Mask | (uncredited) | |
| 2007 | Day 73 with Sarah | Sarah | Short film | |
| 2007 | The Nines | Noelle | | |
| 2007 | Reservation Road | Emma Learner | | |
| 2008 | The Curious Case of Benjamin Button | Daisy Fuller (Age 7) | | |
| 2008 | Phoebe in Wonderland | Phoebe Lichten | | |
| 2009 | Astro Boy | Grace | Voice | |
| 2010 | The Nutcracker in 3D | Mary | | |
| 2010 | Somewhere | Cleo | | |
| 2011 | The Curve of Forgotten Things | Girl | Short film | |
| 2011 | Super 8 | Alice Dainard | | |
| 2011 | Twixt | V | | |
| 2011 | We Bought a Zoo | Lily Miska | | |
| 2012 | Ginger & Rosa | Ginger | | |
| 2012 | Leaning Toward Solace | Sara | Short film | |
| 2013 | Likeness | Mia | Short film | |
| 2014 | Young Ones | Mary Holms | | |
| 2014 | Low Down | Amy-Jo Albany | | |
| 2014 | Maleficent | Princess Aurora | | |
| 2014 | The Boxtrolls | Winnie | Voice | |
| 2015 | Trumbo | Nikola Trumbo | | |
| 2015 | 3 Generations | Ray | | |
| 2016 | The Neon Demon | Jesse | | |
| 2016 | 20th Century Women | Julie Hamlin | | |
| 2016 | Ballerina (Note: The film was released in the United States under the title Leap.) | Félicie Le Bras | Voice | |
| 2016 | Live by Night | Loretta Figgis | | |
| 2017 | The Vanishing of Sidney Hall | Melody Jameson | | |
| 2017 | How to Talk to Girls at Parties | Zan | | |
| 2017 | The Beguiled | Alicia | | |
| 2017 | Mary Shelley | Mary Shelley | | |
| 2018 | I Think We're Alone Now | Grace | | |
| 2018 | Galveston | Rocky | | |
| 2018 | Teen Spirit | Violet Valenski | | |
| 2019 | A Rainy Day in New York | Ashleigh Enright | | |
| 2019 | Maleficent: Mistress of Evil | Princess Aurora | | |
| 2020 | The Roads Not Taken | Molly | | |
| 2020 | All the Bright Places | Violet Markey | Also producer | |
| 2024 | A Complete Unknown | Sylvie Russo | | |
| 2025 | Sentimental Value | Rachel Kemp | | |
| 2025 | Predator: Badlands | Thia / Tessa | | |
| 2026 | Rosebush Pruning | Martha | | |
| 2026 | The Hunger Games: Sunrise on the Reaping | Effie Trinket | | |
| 2027 | The Nightingale † | Isabelle Rossignol | Post-production; also producer | |

=== Television ===
| Year | Title | Role | Notes |
|---|---|---|---|
| 2002 | Taken | Allie Keys (Age 3) | Episode: "Charlie and Lisa" |
| 2003 | Judging Amy | Rochelle Cobbs | Episode: "Maxine Interrupted" |
| 2003 | CSI: Miami | Molly Walker | Episode: "Death Grip" |
| 2004 | CSI: NY | Jenny Como | Episode: "Officer Blue" |
| 2006 | House, M.D. | Stella Dalton | Episode: "Need to Know" |
| 2006 | Law & Order: Special Victims Unit | Eden | Episode: "Cage" |
| 2006 | The Lost Room | Anna Miller | 3 episodes; mini series |
| 2006–2007 | Criminal Minds | Tracy Belle | 2 episodes |
| 2007 | Dirty Sexy Money | Kiki George | Episode: "Pilot" |
| 2014 | HitRecord on TV | Daughter | Episode: "RE: The Number One” |
| 2020 | The Disney Family Singalong | Herself | Television special |
| 2020–2023 | The Great | Catherine the Great | Lead role, 30 episodes; also executive producer |
| 2021 | No Activity | Madison | Voice; episode: "Magnolia" |
| 2021 | Robot Chicken | Sarah, Logan's Friend, Nerd's Wife | Voice; episode: "May Cause the Need for Speed" |
| 2022 | The Girl from Plainville | Michelle Carter | Lead role; also executive producer |
| 2024 | Mastermind: To Think Like a Killer | —N/a | Executive producer |
| 2025 | Death in Apartment 603: What Happened to Ellen Greenberg? | —N/a | Executive producer |
| 2026–present | Margo's Got Money Troubles | Margo Millet | Lead role; also executive producer |
| TBA | Discretion | Lenny | Lead role; also executive producer |

=== Theatre ===
| Year | Title | Role | Playwright | Venue | Ref. |
|---|---|---|---|---|---|
| 2023 | Appropriate | River Rayner | Branden Jacobs-Jenkins | Hayes Theater, Broadway | |

== Music videos ==
| Year | Title | Artist(s) | Role | Notes | Ref. |
|---|---|---|---|---|---|
| 2016 | "Good Morning" | Grouplove | | | |

== Video games ==
| Year | Title | Role | Notes | Ref. |
|---|---|---|---|---|
| 2025 | Death Stranding 2: On the Beach | Tomorrow | Motion Capture, Voice and likeness | |
