= List of awards and nominations received by Elle Fanning =

Elle Fanning awards and nominations
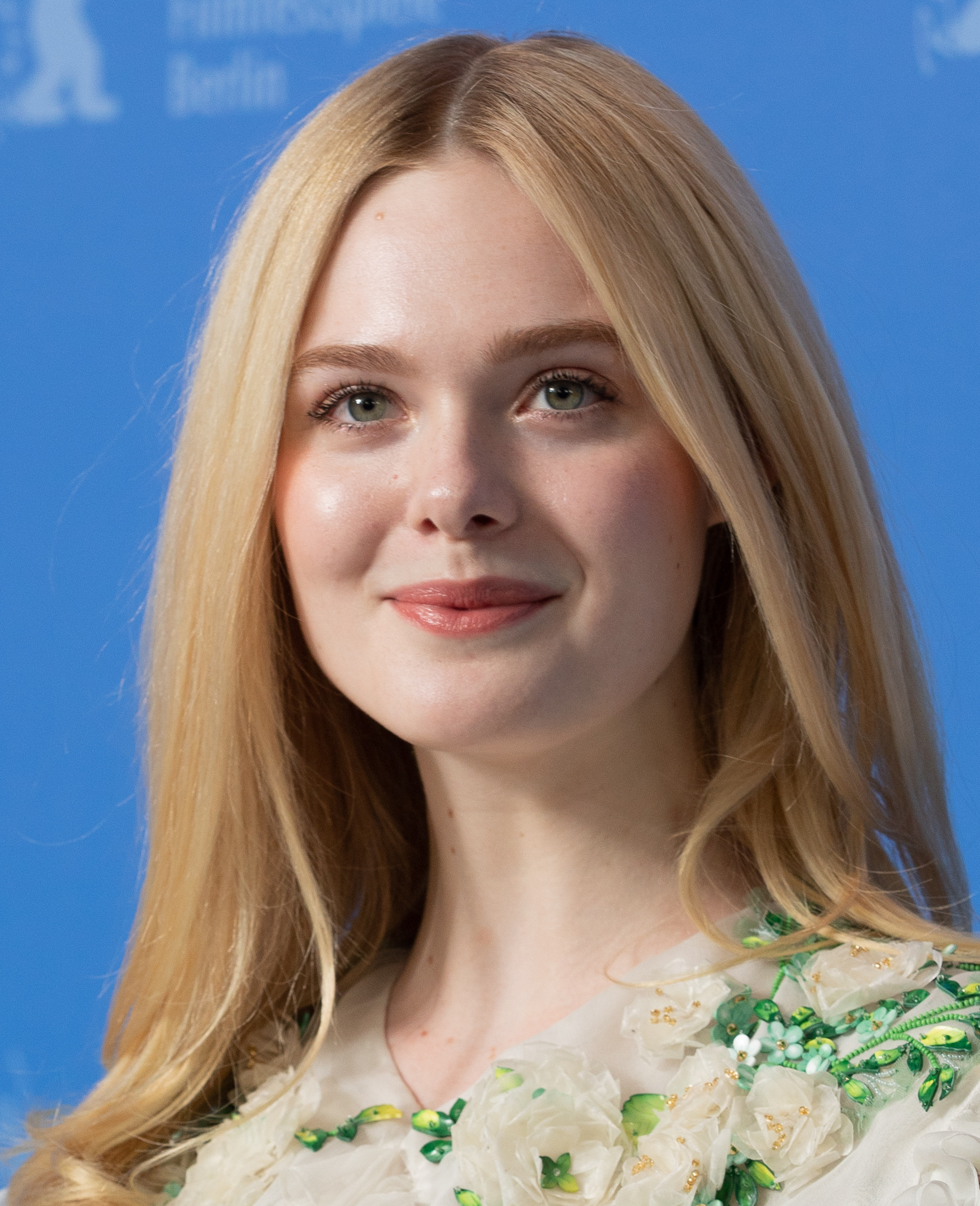
- Fanning at Berlinale in 2020
Awards and nominations
Award	Wins	Nominations
Academy Awards	0	1
Actor Awards	0	5
Critics' Choice	0	8
Emmy Awards	0	4
Golden Globes	0	4

Totals (Note: Certain award groups do not simply award one winner. They acknowledge several different recipients, have runners-up, and have third place. Since this is a specific recognition and is different from losing an award, runner-up mentions are considered wins in this award tally. For simplification and to avoid errors, each award in this list has been presumed to have had a prior nomination.)
- Wins: 19
- Nominations: 122

This article is a list of awards and nominations received by Elle Fanning.

Elle Fanning is an American actress known for work in film and television. She started as a child actor before transitioning to more mature roles. Over her career she has worked across genres ranging from Hollywood blockbusters to Independent dramas. She has received various accolades including nominations for an Academy Award, two Emmy Awards, four Golden Globe Awards, six Critics' Choice Awards and five Screen Actors Guild Awards.

Fanning made her film debut in the child custody drama I Am Sam (2001), which co-starred her older sister Dakota, she followed with supporting roles in the family comedy Daddy Day Care (2003), the family comedy-drama Because of Winn-Dixie (2005), the psychological drama Babel (2006), and the fantasy romance drama The Curious Case of Benjamin Button (2008). She then transitioned into leading roles where she received critical attention as well as nominations for the Critics' Choice Movie Award for Best Young Performer for the Sofia Coppola drama Somewhere (2010), the J. J. Abrams science-fiction thriller Super 8 (2011) and the Sally Potter the coming-of-age drama Ginger & Rosa (2012), which she was also nominated for a British Independent Film Award.

She also portrayed Princess Aurora in the Disney fantasy film Maleficent (2014) and its sequel Maleficent: Mistress of Evil (2019). For the former she was nominated for a Saturn Award, a Teen Choice Award, and a Kids' Choice Award. She then focused her career on independent films such as the historical drama Trumbo (2015), the psychological horror film The Neon Demon (2016), the coming-of-age dramedy 20th Century Women (2016), and reunited with Sofia Coppola in the Southern Gothic thriller The Beguiled (2017). She portrayed Sylvie Russo in the Bob Dylan biopic A Complete Unknown (2024) for which she won the National Board of Review Award for Best Supporting Actress.

On television, she portrayed Catherine the Great in the Hulu satirical period dramedy The Great (2020–2023) earning nominations for the Primetime Emmy Award for Outstanding Lead Actress in a Comedy Series, three Golden Globe Awards for Best Actress – Television Series Musical or Comedy, and a Screen Actors Guild Award for Outstanding Performance by a Female Actor in a Comedy Series. She also played Michelle Carter in the Hulu crime miniseries The Girl from Plainville (2022) earning nominations for a Hollywood Critics Association TV Award and a Satellite Award. On stage, she first appeared on Broadway playing a hippie in the Branden Jacobs-Jenkins family drama play Appropriate (2023).

== Major associations ==
=== Academy Awards ===
Year	Category	Nominated work	Result	Ref.
2026	Best Supporting Actress	Sentimental Value	Nominated	

=== Actor Awards ===
Year	Category	Nominated work	Result	Ref.
2015	Outstanding Cast Ensemble in a Motion Picture	Trumbo	Nominated	
2020	Outstanding Ensemble in a Comedy Series	The Great	Nominated	
2021	Outstanding Ensemble in a Comedy Series	The Great	Nominated	
2021	Outstanding Actress in a Comedy Series	The Great	Nominated	
2024	Outstanding Cast Ensemble in a Motion Picture	A Complete Unknown	Nominated	

=== Critics' Choice Awards ===
Year	Category	Nominated work	Result	Ref.
Critics' Choice Movie Awards
2010	Best Young Actor/Actress	Somewhere	Nominated	
2011	Best Young Actor/Actress	Super 8	Nominated	
2013	Best Young Actor/Actress	Ginger & Rosa	Nominated	
2015	Best Acting Ensemble	Trumbo	Nominated	
2016	Best Acting Ensemble	20th Century Women	Nominated	
2025	Best Supporting Actress	Sentimental Value	Nominated	
Critics' Choice Television Awards
2021	Best Actress in a Comedy Series	The Great	Nominated	
Critics' Choice Super Awards
2026	Best Actress in a Science Fiction/Fantasy Movie	Predator: Badlands	Nominated	

=== Emmy Awards ===
Year	Category	Nominated work	Result	Ref.
Primetime Emmy Awards
2022	Outstanding Lead Actress in a Comedy Series	The Great	Nominated	
2026	Outstanding Lead Actress in a Comedy Series	Margo's Got Money Troubles	Nominated	
2026	Outstanding Comedy Series	Margo's Got Money Troubles	Nominated	
News and Documentary Emmy Awards
2025	Outstanding Crime and Justice Documentary	Mastermind: To Think Like a Killer	Nominated	

=== Golden Globe Awards ===
Year	Category	Nominated work	Result	Ref.
2020	Best Actress – Television Series Musical or Comedy	The Great	Nominated	
2021	Best Actress – Television Series Musical or Comedy	The Great	Nominated	
2023	Best Actress – Television Series Musical or Comedy	The Great	Nominated	
2025	Best Supporting Actress – Motion Picture	Sentimental Value	Nominated	

== Miscellaneous accolades ==
Miscellaneous Awards
Year	Award	Category	Work	Result	Ref.
2004	Young Artist Award	Best Young Ensemble in a Feature Film	Daddy Day Care	Nominated	
2007	Young Artist Award	Best Supporting Young Actress	The Lost Room	Nominated	
2007	Young Artist Award	Best Young Actress Age Ten or Younger - Film	Babel	Nominated	
2009	Women Film Critics Circle Awards	Best Young Actress	Phoebe in Wonderland	Nominated	
2010	Online Film & Television Association	Best Youth Performance	Phoebe in Wonderland	Nominated	
2011	Young Hollywood Award	Actress of the Year Award	Somewhere	Won	
2011	International Cinephile Society	Best Supporting Actress	Somewhere	Runner-up	
2011	Online Film & Television Association	Best Youth Performance	Somewhere	Nominated	
2011	Young Artist Award	Best Leading Young Actress - Feature Film	The Nutcracker in 3D	Nominated	
2011	Hollywood Film Festival	Spotlight Award	Super 8	Won	
2011	Satellite Award	Best Actress in a Supporting Role	Super 8	Nominated	
2011	Scream Award	Breakout Performance: Female	Super 8	Nominated	
2011	Teen Choice Award	Choice Movie Actress: Sci-Fi/Fantasy	Super 8	Nominated	
2011	Teen Choice Award	Choice Movie Chemistry	Super 8	Nominated	
2011	Young Artist Award	Best Leading Young Actress - Feature Film	Super 8	Nominated	
2011	Young Artist Award	Best Young Ensemble Cast - Feature Film	Super 8	Nominated	
2011	MTV Movie Award	Best Breakthrough Performance	Super 8	Nominated	
2011	Saturn Award	Best Performance by a Younger Actor	Super 8	Nominated	
2011	Phoenix Film Critics Society Awards	Best Ensemble Acting	Super 8	Won	
2011	Phoenix Film Critics Society Awards	Best Performance by a Youth in a Lead or Supporting Role	Super 8	Nominated	
2011	Phoenix Film Critics Society Awards	Breakthrough on Camera	Super 8	Won	
2011	IGN Summer Movie Awards	Best Movie Actress	Super 8	Nominated	
2012	British Independent Film Award	Best Actress in a British Independent Film	Ginger & Rosa	Nominated	
2012	Valladolid International Film Festival	Best Actress	Ginger & Rosa	Won	
2012	Empire Awards	Best Female Newcomer	Super 8	Nominated	
2012	Online Film & Television Association	Best Youth Performance	Super 8	Nominated	
2013	Santa Barbara International Film Festival	Virtuoso Award	Ginger & Rosa	Won	
2013	Women Film Critics Circle Awards	Best Young Actress	Ginger & Rosa	Nominated	
2013	Women Film Critics Circle Awards	Women's Work/Best Ensemble	Ginger & Rosa	Won	
2014	Teen Choice Award	Choice Movie Actress: Action	Maleficent	Nominated	
2014	Young Hollywood Awards	Breakthrough Actress	—N/a	Nominated	
2014	Karlovy Vary International Film Festival	Best Actress	Low Down	Won	
2015	Saturn Award	Best Performance by a Younger Actor	Maleficent	Nominated	
2015	Kids' Choice Award	Favorite Movie Actress	Maleficent	Nominated	
2015	Young Artist Awards	Best Performance in a Feature Film - Leading Young Actress	Maleficent	Nominated	
2016
2016	Young Artist Award	Best Performance in a Feature Film - Leading Young Actress	Trumbo	Nominated	
2016	Detroit Film Critics Society	Best Supporting Actress	20th Century Women	Nominated	
2016	Detroit Film Critics Society	Best Ensemble	20th Century Women	Won	
2016	Florida Film Critics Circle	Best Ensemble	20th Century Women	Nominated	
2016	Georgia Film Critics Association	Best Ensemble	20th Century Women	Nominated	
2016	Washington DC Area Film Critics Association	Best Acting Ensemble	20th Century Women	Nominated	
2016	Women Film Critics Circle Awards	Women's Work/Best Ensemble	20th Century Women	Nominated	
2016	New Mexico Film Critics	Best Ensemble	20th Century Women	Nominated	
2017
2017	Bodil Awards	Best Actress	The Neon Demon	Nominated	
2017	Roberts Awards	Best Actress	The Neon Demon	Nominated	
2017	International Online Cinema Awards	Best Ensemble	20th Century Women	Nominated	
2017	International Online Cinema Awards	Best Ensemble Cast	The Beguiled	Won	
2018	Women Film Critics Circle Awards	Best Young Actress	Mary Shelley	Nominated	
2020	TCA Award	Individual Achievement in Comedy	The Great	Nominated	
2020	Online Film & Television Association	Best Actress in a Comedy Series	The Great	Nominated	
2021	Independent Spirit Awards	Best Female Performance in a New Scripted Series	The Great	Nominated	
2021	Satellite Awards	Best Actress in a Musical or Comedy Series	The Great	Won	
2021	Seoul Drama Awards	Best Actress	The Great	Won	
2021	Gotham Independent Films Awards	Breakthrough Series - Longform	The Great	Nominated	
2022	Gracie Allen Awards	Actress in a Leading Role - Comedy or Musical	The Great	Won	
2022	Online Film & Television Association	Best Actress in a Comedy Series	The Great	Nominated	
2022	Hollywood Critics Association Television Awards	Best Actress in a Streaming Limited or Anthology Series or Movie	The Girl from Plainville	Nominated	
2022	Hollywood Critics Association Television Awards	Best Actress in a Streaming Series, Comedy	The Great	Nominated	
2023	Satellite Awards	Best Actress in a Miniseries, Limited Series or Motion Picture Made for Television	The Girl from Plainville	Nominated	
2024
2024	Satellite Awards	Best Actress in a Series, Comedy or Musical	The Great	Nominated	
2024	Broadway.com Audience Awards	Favorite Featured Actress in a Play	Appropriate	Won	
2024	Broadway.com Audience Awards	Favorite Breakthrough Performance (Female)	Appropriate	Nominated	
2024	Las Vegas Film Critics Society	Best Supporting Actress	A Complete Unknown	Nominated	
2024	National Board of Review Awards	Best Supporting Actress	A Complete Unknown	Won	
2025
2025	Austin Film Critics Association	Double Threat Special Award	Predator: Badlands	Honored	
2025	New York Film Critics Online	Best Supporting Actress	Sentimental Value	Nominated	
2025	New York Film Critics Online	Best Ensemble Cast	Sentimental Value	Nominated	
2025	Washington D.C. Area Film Critics Association	Best Ensemble	Sentimental Value	Nominated	
2025	St. Louis Film Critics Association Awards	Best Supporting Actress	Sentimental Value	Nominated	
2025	San Francisco Bay Area Film Critics Circle Awards	Best Supporting Actress	Sentimental Value	Nominated	
2025	Las Vegas Film Critics Society	Best Supporting Actress	Sentimental Value	Nominated	
2025	Online Association of Female Film Critics	Best Supporting Female	Sentimental Value	Nominated	
2025	Online Association of Female Film Critics	Best Casting Ensemble	Sentimental Value	Nominated	
2025	Florida Film Critics Circle	Best Ensemble	Sentimental Value	Nominated	
2025	Georgia Film Critics Association	Best Ensemble	Sentimental Value	Nominated	
2025	North Texas Film Critics Association	Best Supporting Actress	Sentimental Value	Nominated	
2025	New Jersey Film Critics Circle	Best Supporting Actress	Sentimental Value	Nominated	
2025	New Jersey Film Critics Circle	Best Acting Ensemble	Sentimental Value	Nominated	
2025	Greater Western New York Film Critics Association	Best Ensemble	Sentimental Value	Nominated	
2025	Film Critics Association UK	Best Supporting Actress	Sentimental Value	Nominated	
2026			Sentimental Value		
2026	Minnesota Film Critics Association	Best Supporting Actress	Sentimental Value	Nominated	
2026	Minnesota Film Critics Association	Best Ensemble	Sentimental Value	Nominated	
2026	Palm Springs International Film Festival	International Star Award	Sentimental Value	Honored (Note: Shared with Renate Reinsve, Inga Ibsdotter Lilleaas and Stellan Skarsgård.)	
2026	Hawaii Film Critics Society	Best Supporting Actress	Sentimental Value	Nominated	
2026	Music City Film Critics Association	Best Ensemble	Sentimental Value	Nominated	
2026	Satellite Awards	Best Actress in a Supporting Role	Sentimental Value	Nominated	
2026	Astra Film Awards	Best Supporting Actress - Drama	Sentimental Value	Nominated	
2026	Astra Film Awards	Best Cast Ensemble	Sentimental Value	Nominated	
2026	Astra Film Awards	The Vanguard Award	Sentimental Value	Honored	
2026	AACTA International Awards	Best Supporting Actress in Film	Sentimental Value	Nominated	
2026	North Dakota Film Society	Best Supporting Actress	Sentimental Value	Nominated	
2026	North Dakota Film Society	Best Ensemble	Sentimental Value	Nominated	
2026	Houston Film Critics Society	Best Ensemble	Sentimental Value	Nominated	
2026	Midnight Critics Circle Awards	Best Supporting Actress	Sentimental Value	Nominated	
2026	Midnight Critics Circle Awards	Best Ensemble	Sentimental Value	Won	
2026	DiscussingFilm Critics Awards	Best Supporting Actress	Sentimental Value	Nominated	
2026	DiscussingFilm Critics Awards	Best Ensemble	Sentimental Value	Nominated	
2026	International Film Society Critics	Best Supporting Actress	Sentimental Value	Pending	
2026	International Film Society Critics	Best Ensemble	Sentimental Value	Pending	
2026	International Film Society Critics	Best Body of Work 2025	Sentimental Value	Pending	
2026	Utah Film Critics Association	Best Supporting Actress	Sentimental Value	Nominated	
2026	Utah Film Critics Association	Best Ensemble	Sentimental Value	Nominated	
2026	Utah Film Critics Association	Vice/Martin Award for Performance in a Science-Fiction, Fantasy, or Horror Film	Predator: Badlands	Nominated	
2026	Saturn Awards	Best Actress	Predator: Badlands	Won	
