= Rape trauma syndrome =

Psychological trauma experienced by a rape victim

Rape trauma syndrome (RTS) is the psychological trauma experienced by a rape survivor that includes disruptions to normal physical, emotional, cognitive, and interpersonal behavior. The theory was first described by nurse Ann Wolbert Burgess and sociologist Lynda Lytle Holmstrom in 1974.

RTS is a cluster of psychological and physical signs, symptoms and reactions common to most rape victims immediately following a rape, but which can also occur for months or years afterwards. While most research into RTS has focused on female victims, sexually abused males (whether by male or female perpetrators) also exhibit RTS symptoms. RTS paved the way for consideration of complex post-traumatic stress disorder, which can more accurately describe the consequences of protracted trauma than post-traumatic stress disorder alone. The symptoms of RTS and post-traumatic stress syndrome overlap. As might be expected, a person who has been raped will generally experience high levels of distress immediately afterward. These feelings may subside over time for some people; however, individually each syndrome can have long devastating effects on rape victims and some victims will continue to experience some form of psychological distress for months or years. Rape survivors are at high risk for developing substance use disorders, major depression, generalized anxiety disorder, and obsessive-compulsive disorder.

== Common stages ==
RTS identifies three stages of psychological trauma a rape survivor goes through: the acute stage, the outer adjustment stage, and the renormalization stage.

=== Acute stage ===
The acute stage occurs in the days or weeks after a rape. Durations vary as to the amount of time the victim may remain in the acute stage. The immediate symptoms may last a few days to a few weeks and may overlap with the outward adjustment stage. According to Scarse, there is no "typical" response amongst rape victims. However, the U.S. Rape Abuse and Incest National Network (RAINN) asserts that, in most cases, a rape victim's acute stage can be classified as one of three responses: expressed ("He or she may appear agitated or hysterical, [and] may suffer from crying spells or anxiety attacks"); controlled ("the survivor appears to be without emotion and acts as if 'nothing happened' and 'everything is fine'"); or shock/disbelief ("the survivor reacts with a strong sense of disorientation. They may have difficulty concentrating, making decisions, or doing everyday tasks. They may also have poor recall of the assault"). Not all rape survivors show their emotions outwardly. Some may appear calm and unaffected by the assault.

Behaviors present in the acute stage can include:

- Diminished alertness
- Numbness
- Dulled sensory, affective and memory functions
- Disorganized thought content
- Vomiting
- Nausea
- Paralyzing anxiety
- Pronounced internal tremor
- Obsession to wash or clean themselves
- Hysteria, confusion and crying
- Bewilderment
- Acute sensitivity to the reaction of other people

=== Outward adjustment stage ===
Survivors in this stage seem to have resumed their normal lifestyle. However, they simultaneously suffer profound internal turmoil, which may manifest in a variety of ways as the survivor copes with the long-term trauma of a rape. In a 1976 paper, Burgess and Holmstrom note that all but 1 of their 92 subjects exhibited maladaptive coping mechanisms after a rape. The outward adjustment stage may last from several months to many years after a rape.

RAINN identifies five main coping strategies during the outward adjustment phase:

- minimization (pretending 'everything is fine')
- dramatization (cannot stop talking about the assault)
- suppression (refuses to discuss the rape)
- explanation (analyzes what happened)
- flight (moves to a new home or city, alters appearance)

Other coping mechanisms that may appear during the outward adjustment phase include:

- poor health in general.
- continuing anxiety
- sense of helplessness
- Carelessness of themselves or others around them (they could not protect themselves against the attack so they lose self care)
- hypervigilance
- inability to maintain previously close relationships
- experiencing a general response of nervousness known as the "startle response"
- persistent fear and or depression at much higher rates than the general population
- mood swings from relatively happy to depression or anger
- extreme anger and hostility (they are very hateful towards the ones that are closest to them).
- sleep disturbances such as vivid dreams and recurring nightmares
- insomnia, wakefulness, night terrors
- flashbacks
- dissociation (feeling like one is not attached to one's body)
- panic attacks
- reliance on coping mechanisms, some of which may be beneficial (e.g., philosophy and family support), and others that may ultimately be counterproductive (e.g., self harm, drug, or alcohol abuse)

==== Lifestyle ====
Survivors in this stage can have their lifestyle affected in some of the following ways:

- Their sense of personal security or safety is damaged.
- They feel hesitant to enter new relationships.
- Questioning their sexual identity or sexual orientation (more typical of men raped by other men or women raped by other women.).
- Sexual relationships become disturbed. Many survivors have reported that they were unable to re-establish normal sexual relations and often shied away from sexual contact for some time after the rape. Some report inhibited sexual response and flashbacks to the rape during intercourse. Conversely, some rape survivors become hyper-sexual or promiscuous following sexual attacks, sometimes as a way to reassert a measure of control over their sexual relations.

Some rape survivors may see the world as a more threatening place to live in, so they will place restrictions on their lives, interrupting their normal activity. For example, they may discontinue previously active involvements in societies, groups or clubs, or a parent who was a survivor of rape may place restrictions on the freedom of their children.

==== Physiological responses ====
Whether or not they were injured during a sexual assault, survivors exhibit higher rates of poor health in the months and years after an assault, including acute somatoform disorders (physical symptoms with no identifiable cause). Physiological reactions such as tension headaches, fatigue, general feelings of soreness or localized pain in the chest, throat, arms or legs. Specific symptoms may occur that relate to the area of the body assaulted. Survivors of oral rape may have a variety of mouth and throat complaints, while survivors of vaginal or anal rape have physical reactions related to these areas.

==== Nature of the assault ====
- The nature of the act, the relationship with the offender, the type and amount of force used, and the circumstances of the assault all influence the impact of an assault on the survivor.
- When the assault is committed by a stranger, fear seems to be the most difficult emotion to manage for many people. (Feelings of vulnerability arise.)
- More commonly, assaults are committed by someone the survivor knows and trusts. May be heightened feelings of self-blame and guilt.

=== Underground stage ===
- Survivors attempt to return to their lives as if nothing happened.
- May block thoughts of the assault from their minds and may not want to talk about the incident or any of the related issues. (They do not want to think about it.)
- Survivors may have difficulty in concentrating and some depression.
- Dissociation and trying to get back to their lives before the assault.
- The underground stage may last for years — the survivor may seem as though they are "over it", when in fact the emotional issues are not resolved.

=== Reorganization stage ===
- May return to emotional turmoil
- The return of emotional pain can extremely frighten people in this stage.
- Fears and phobias may develop. They may be related specifically to the assailant or the circumstances or the attack or they may be much more generalized.
- Appetite disturbances such as nausea and vomiting. Rape survivors are also prone to developing anorexia nervosa and/or bulimia.
- Nightmares, night terrors feel like they plague the victim.
- Violent fantasies of revenge may also arise.

==== Phobias ====
A common psychological defense that is seen in rape survivors is the development of fears and phobias specific to the circumstances of the rape, for example:

- A fear of being in crowds.
- A fear of being left alone anywhere.
- A fear of men or women. (androphobia or gynophobia)
- A fear of going out at all, agoraphobia.
- A fear of being touched, hapnophobia.
- Specific fears related to certain characteristics of the assailant, e.g. side-burns, straight hair, the smell of alcohol or cigarettes, type of clothing or car.
- Some survivors develop very suspicious, paranoid feelings about strangers.
- Some feel a pervasive fear of most or all other people.

=== Renormalization stage ===
In this stage, the survivor begins to recognize their adjustment phase. Recognizing the impact of the rape for survivors who were in denial, and recognizing the secondary damage of any counterproductive coping tactics (e.g., recognizing that one's drug abuse began to help cope with the aftermath of a rape) is particularly important. Male survivors typically do not seek psychotherapy for a long time after the sexual assault—according to Lacey and Roberts, less than half of male survivors sought therapy within six months and the average interval between assault and therapy was 2.5 years; King and Woollett's study of over 100 male rape survivors found that the mean interval between assault and therapy was 16.4 years.

During renormalization, survivors integrate the sexual assault into their lives so that the rape is no longer the central focus of their lives; negative feelings such as guilt and shame become resolved, and survivors no longer blame themselves for the attack.

== Legal issues ==
Prosecutors sometimes use RTS evidence to disabuse jurors of prejudicial misconceptions arising from a victim's ostensibly unusual post-rape behavior. The RTS testimony helps educate the jury about the psychological consequences surrounding rape and functions to dispel rape myths by explaining counterintuitive post-rape behavior.

Especially in cases in which prosecutors have introduced RTS testimony, defendants have also sometimes proffered RTS evidence, a practice that has been criticized as undermining core values embodied in rape shield laws, since it can involve subjecting victims to compelled psychological evaluations and searching cross-examination regarding past sexual history. Since social scientists have difficulty distinguishing symptoms attributable to rape-related PTSD from those induced by previous traumatic events, rape defendants sometimes argue that an alternative traumatic event, such as a previous rape, could be the source of the victim's symptoms.

== Criticism ==
A criticism of rape trauma syndrome as currently conceptualized is that it delegitimizes a person's reaction to rape by describing their coping mechanisms, including their rational attempts to struggle through, survive the pain of sexual assault, and to adapt to a violent world, as symptoms of disorder. People who installed locks and purchased security devices, took self-defense classes, carried mace, changed residence, and expressed anger at the criminal justice system, for example, were characterized as exhibiting pathological symptoms and "adjustment difficulties". According to this criticism, RTS removes a person's pain and anger from their social and political context, attributing a person's anguish, humiliation, anger, and despair after being raped to a disorder caused by the actions of the rapist, rather than to, say, insensitive treatment by the police, examining physicians, and the judicial system; or to family reactions permeated with rape mythology.

Another criticism is that the literature on RTS constructs rape survivors as passive, disordered victims, even though much of the behavior that serves as the basis for RTS could be considered the product of strength. Words like "fear" are replaced with words like "phobia", with its connotations of irrationality.

Criticisms of the scientific validity of the RTS construct are that it is vague in important details; it is unclear what its boundary conditions are; it uses unclear terms that do not have a basis in psychological science; it fails to specify key quantitative relationships; it has not undergone subsequent scientific evaluation since the 1974 Burgess and Holstrom study; there are theoretical allegiance effects; it has not achieved a consensus in the field; it is not falsifiable; it ignores possible mediators; it is not culturally sensitive; and it is not suitable for being used to infer that rape has or has not occurred. PTSD has been described as a superior model since unlike RTS, empirical examination of the PTSD model has been extensive, both conceptually and empirically.

== See also ==
- Psychological trauma
  - Post traumatic stress disorder
    - Complex post-traumatic stress disorder
- Major depressive disorder
- Stress response
- Abuse
  - Domestic violence
    - Sexual violence
    - Sexual abuse
      - Sexual assault
    - Child abuse
    - Spousal abuse
