= Elle Fanning =

American actress (born 1998)

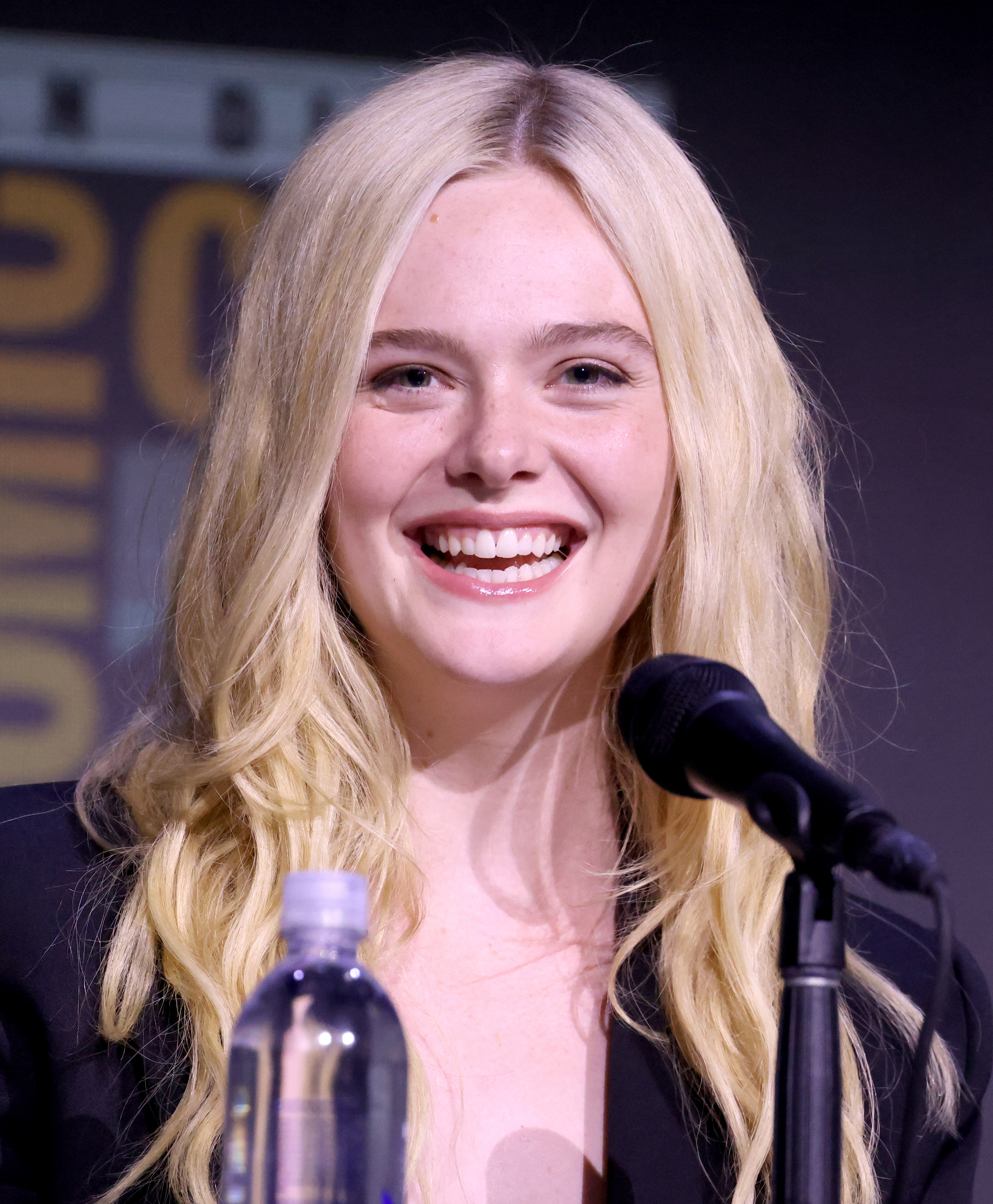
- Fanning in 2025
- Born: Mary Elle Fanning; April 9, 1998 (age 28); Conyers, Georgia, U.S.
- Occupation: Actress
- Years active: 2001–present
- Works: Full list
- Relatives: Dakota Fanning (sister); Rick Arrington (grandfather); Jill Arrington (aunt)
- Awards: Full list

Mary Elle Fanning (born April 9, 1998) is an American actress. Her accolades include nominations for an Academy Award, four Emmy Awards, and four Golden Globe Awards.

Fanning made her film debut at the age of three, as the younger version of her sister Dakota Fanning's character in I Am Sam (2001). A prolific child actress, she went on to appear in films such as Daddy Day Care (2003), Babel (2006), The Curious Case of Benjamin Button (2008), and Phoebe in Wonderland (2008). She gained further recognition for her leading and supporting roles in Sofia Coppola's drama film Somewhere (2010), J. J. Abrams' science fiction film Super 8 (2011), Cameron Crowe's biographical comedy-drama film We Bought a Zoo (2011) and the Disney fantasy film Maleficent (2014).

As an adult, Fanning's career progressed with performances in acclaimed independent films such as Nicolas Winding Refn's The Neon Demon (2016), Mike Mills' 20th Century Women (2016), Sofia Coppola's The Beguiled (2017) and Joachim Trier's Sentimental Value (2025); the latter earned her a nomination for the Academy Award for Best Supporting Actress. She returned to mainstream films with the sequel Maleficent: Mistress of Evil (2019), James Mangold's A Complete Unknown (2024) and Dan Trachtenberg's Predator: Badlands (2025).

On television, she starred as Catherine the Great in the period satire series The Great (2020–2023) and as Michelle Carter in the miniseries The Girl from Plainville (2022), earning a nomination for the Primetime Emmy Award for Outstanding Lead Actress in a Comedy Series for the former. She earned further Primetime Emmy Award nominations for producing and starring in the Apple TV comedy series Margo's Got Money Troubles (2026–present). On stage, she made her Broadway debut in the Branden Jacobs-Jenkins play Appropriate (2023).

== Early life ==
Mary Elle Fanning was born on April 9, 1998, in Conyers, Georgia, a suburb of Atlanta. Her mother is Heather Joy (née Arrington), and her father is Steven J. Fanning, who played for St. Louis Cardinals-affiliated Minor League Baseball teams.

Her maternal grandfather was American football player Rick Arrington, and her aunt is ESPN reporter Jill Arrington. Among the Arrington family's notable ancestors is the planter William Farrar. Her paternal grandmother was a German immigrant. Fanning is actress Dakota Fanning's younger sister. She and her sister use their middle names as given names per family tradition. They were brought up in the Southern Baptist Convention.

Fanning did several physical activities such as dance as a child, which she credits with helping prepare her for her acting career. Her family moved from Georgia to Los Angeles around the time Dakota's acting career took off. She graduated from high school at Campbell Hall School in 2016.

== Career ==
=== 2001–2013: Child actress and breakthrough ===
Fanning began her acting career at 3 years old by starring as the younger versions of her sister Dakota's characters in the miniseries Taken and the film I Am Sam. In 2002, at the age of 4, she won her first role independent of her sister in the comedy Daddy Day Care. She was cast for the role of Ruth in The Door in the Floor (2004) opposite Jeff Bridges and Kim Basinger. The film's producers originally planned to hire identical twins for the intense shooting schedule, but were so impressed with Fanning that they used only her. Late in 2003, Fanning appeared in Because of Winn-Dixie in the small role of Sweetie Pie Thomas. In 2004, she performed the voiceover role of Mei in the English-dubbed version of Hayao Miyazaki's animated film My Neighbor Totoro opposite her sister Dakota Fanning, who voiced Satsuki, the older sister to Elle's character. Later that same year, she filmed I Want Someone to Eat Cheese With.

In early 2005, Fanning filmed scenes in Charlotte's Web as the "future granddaughter" of Fern Arable played by Dakota. The scenes did not make the final cut. In mid-2005, she played Debbie, the daughter of Richard and Susan Jones (played by Brad Pitt and Cate Blanchett) in the film Babel. In early 2006, Fanning filmed scenes in both The Nines and Déjà Vu. In mid-2006, she filmed The Lost Room, a science-fiction TV miniseries. Also in 2006, she appeared on the episode "Need to Know" of House: MD, playing the patient's daughter. She appeared in an episode of Criminal Minds in 2006, playing the supporting role of Tracey in "The Boogeyman". By the end of 2006, Fanning began to book lead roles. In the first of these, she played Emma Learner in Reservation Road—the grieving daughter of Grace and Ethan Learner. The film deals with the aftermath of a tragic car accident in which Emma's brother is killed.

In early 2007, Fanning reunited with her Babel co-stars, Brad Pitt and Cate Blanchett, in a small part in The Curious Case of Benjamin Button as the younger version of Blanchett's character. Mid-year 2007, Fanning filmed the title role Phoebe of Phoebe in Wonderland, which also starred Felicity Huffman and was released in March 2009. From July through October 2007, Fanning appeared in The Nutcracker in 3D, playing Mary. It was released in late 2010. In March 2008, Fanning and her sister Dakota were scheduled to star in My Sister's Keeper, but the opportunity fell through when Dakota learned she would have to shave her head. The sisters were replaced by Abigail Breslin and Sofia Vassilieva.

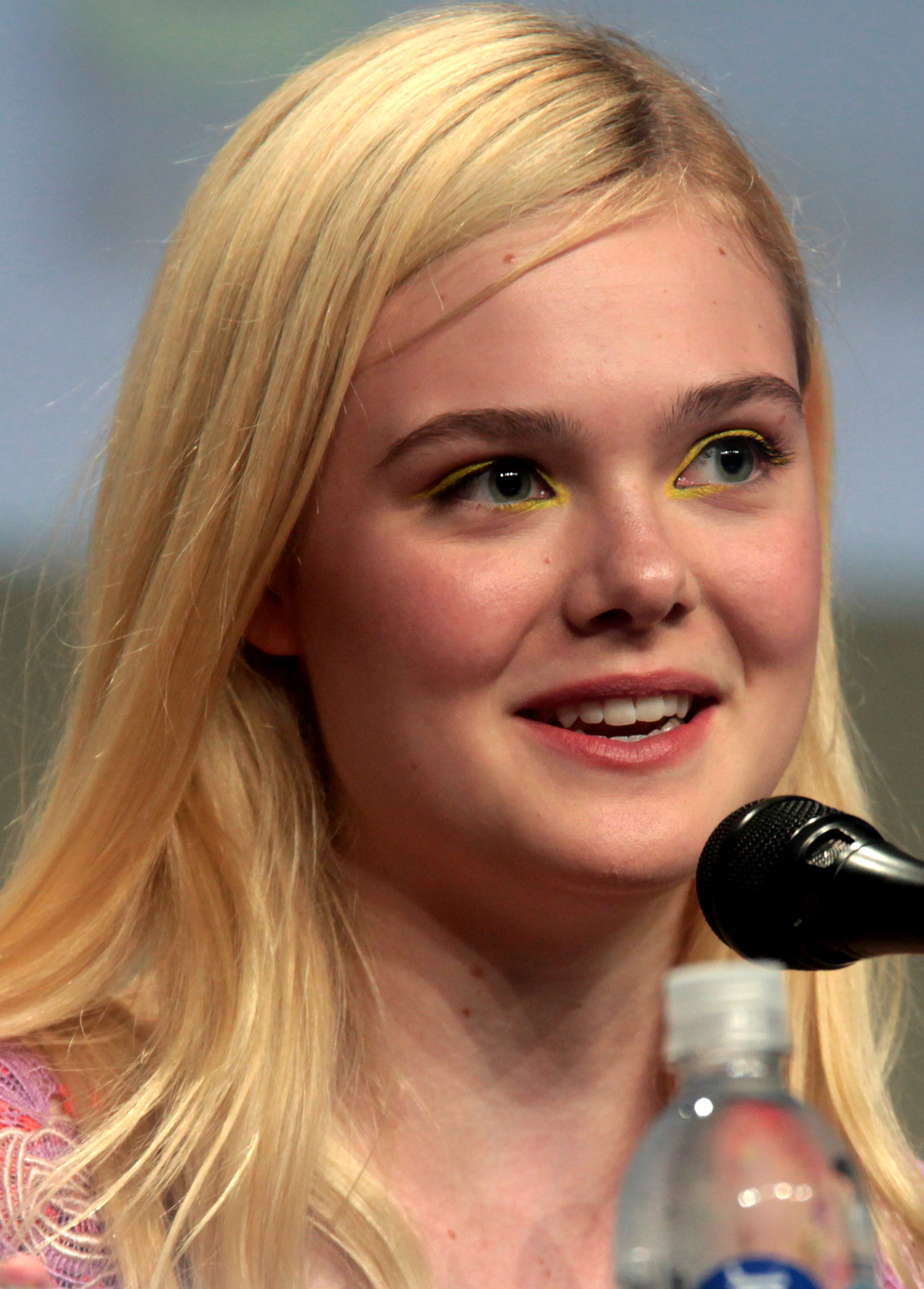
16-year-old Fanning promoting The Boxtrolls in 2014

Variety reported in April 2009 that Fanning would be starring in screenwriter Sofia Coppola's 2010 film Somewhere. The plot centers around a "bad-boy" actor who is forced to re-evaluate his life when his daughter, played by Fanning, arrives unexpectedly. The film was released during the 2010 awards season. At its first film festival, the 67th Venice Film Festival, it took the Golden Lion. In late 2010, Fanning began working on Francis Ford Coppola's 2011 film Twixt, which Coppola based on a dream. She played the role of a young ghost named "V". In 2011, Fanning starred in J. J. Abrams' science-fiction drama film Super 8 as Alice Dainard. The film was released on June 10, 2011, and centers around a group of children who are forced to deal with strange happenings in their small town. The Telegraph cited Fanning as one of the film's best aspects and she received a Spotlight Award at the Hollywood Film Festival.

In December 2011, Fanning appeared in Cameron Crowe's We Bought a Zoo. She played Lily, a 13-year-old who works at the zoo's restaurant and lives on the property with her parental figure, Kelly (Scarlett Johansson). In September 2012, Fanning starred as Ginger along with Alice Englert (who played Rosa) in the drama film Ginger & Rosa that took place during 1962 in London. The film was directed by Sally Potter and was released on October 19, 2012. Fanning has received widespread acclaim for her performance, with A. O. Scott of The New York Times writing that she "shows a nearly Streepian mixture of poise, intensity, and technical precision. It is frightening how good she is and hard to imagine anything she could not do." Ty Burr, film critic for The Boston Globe, praised her "luminous naturalism that seems the opposite of performance" and felt that "Fanning easily convinces you of Ginger's emotional reality."

=== 2014–2019: International recognition ===
In 2014, Fanning starred as Princess Aurora alongside Angelina Jolie as the title character in Maleficent, a live-action re-imagining of Disney's 1959 animation Sleeping Beauty. The same year, she appeared in the independent science-fiction Western Young Ones and starred in the biographical Low Down, about the life of jazz pianist Joe Albany, in which she plays the role of Albany's daughter, Amy-Jo, from whose perspective the story is told. She also had a voice role as Winnie in the animated film The Boxtrolls, which was nominated for the Academy Award for Best Animated Feature. In 2015, Fanning co-starred in Jay Roach's Trumbo as Dalton Trumbo's (Bryan Cranston) daughter Nikola, and starred in 3 Generations (previously known as About Ray), alongside Naomi Watts and Susan Sarandon, playing the role of a young transgender man.

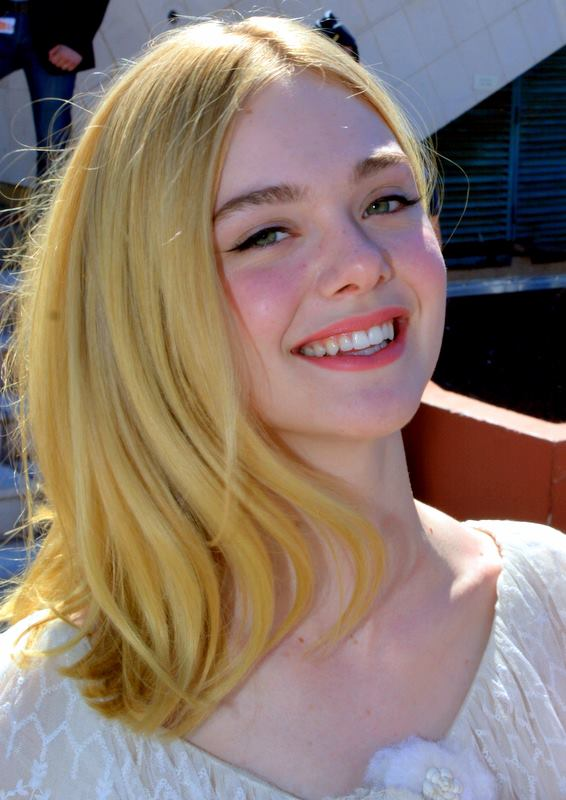
Fanning at the Cannes Film Festival premiere of The Neon Demon in 2016

In 2016, she appeared as Jesse in the psychological thriller The Neon Demon, directed by Nicolas Winding Refn. The film had its world premiere at the Cannes Film Festival in May 2016. It was released on June 24, 2016, and did poorly at the box office. That same year, she appeared in Mike Mills's 20th Century Women, opposite Greta Gerwig and Annette Bening. The film had its world premiere at the New York Film Festival on October 8, 2016, and began a limited release on December 28, 2016. She then co-starred in Ben Affleck's Prohibition-era drama Live by Night, which was released on December 25, 2016.

In 2017, Fanning appeared in Shawn Christensen's feature-length drama The Vanishing of Sidney Hall, which premiered on January 25 at the Sundance Film Festival. In the same year, Fanning appeared in John Cameron Mitchell's British-American science-fiction romantic comedy film How to Talk to Girls at Parties (based on a short story by Neil Gaiman), reuniting with Sofia Coppola in The Beguiled, in the British romantic tragedy film Mary Shelley, directed by Haifaa al-Mansour; and in the music video for Grouplove's single "Good Morning".

In 2018, Fanning starred alongside Peter Dinklage in I Think We're Alone Now, directed by Reed Morano. It had its world premiere at the Sundance Film Festival on January 21, 2018. and was released on September 14, 2018, by Momentum Pictures. She also starred in Galveston opposite Ben Foster, directed by Mélanie Laurent, which had its world premiere at South by Southwest on March 10, 2018. That same year, Fanning starred in Teen Spirit, directed by Max Minghella, which had its world premiere at the Toronto International Film Festival in September 2018. It was released on April 5, 2019.

In May 2019, Fanning was appointed as a jury member of the international competition in the 72nd annual Cannes Film Festival, becoming the youngest Cannes juror in history. That same year, Fanning starred in Woody Allen's romantic comedy film A Rainy Day in New York alongside Timothée Chalamet and Selena Gomez. In October 2019, Fanning reprised the role of Aurora in Maleficent: Mistress of Evil.

=== 2020–present: Career expansion ===
In 2020, Fanning starred in All the Bright Places, opposite Justice Smith, directed by Brett Haley, based upon the novel of the same name by Jennifer Niven, and The Roads Not Taken, directed by Sally Potter, opposite Javier Bardem and Salma Hayek. That same year, Fanning starred in and executive produced the historical comedy series The Great, starring as Catherine the Great alongside Nicholas Hoult. The series premiered on Hulu in May 2020. She received critical acclaim for the role and was nominated in the 2021 Golden Globe Award for Best Actress – Television Series Musical or Comedy. Her performance also earned Fanning her first Primetime Emmy Award nomination for Outstanding Lead Actress in a Comedy Series.

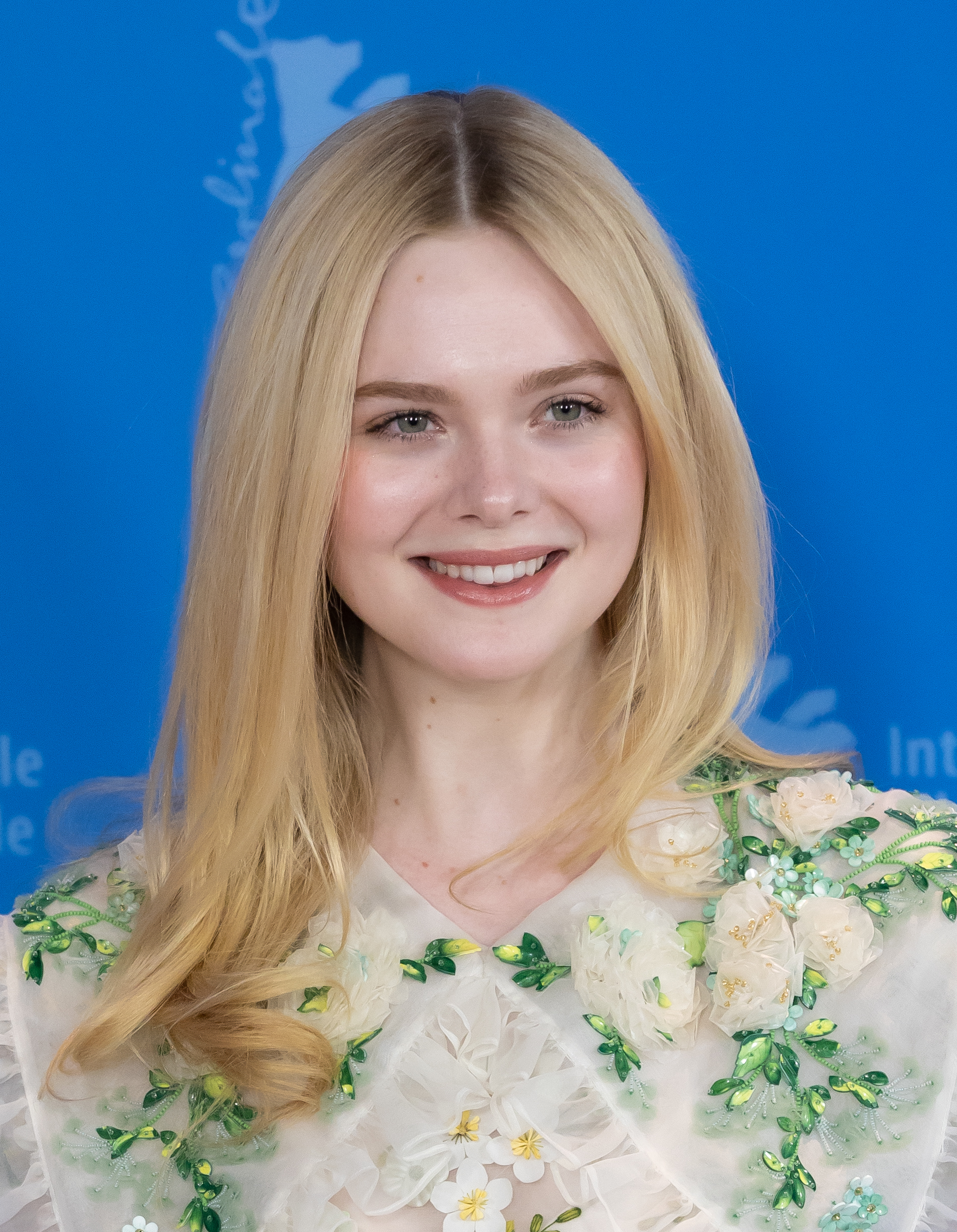
Fanning promoting The Roads Not Taken at the 2020 Berlin International Film Festival

She starred in the 2022 Hulu miniseries The Girl from Plainville, playing Michelle Carter, based on the death of Conrad Roy. In December 2023, she made her official Broadway acting debut in the Branden Jacobs-Jenkins play Appropriate, where she acts alongside Sarah Paulson and Corey Stoll.

Fanning and her sister Dakota started Lewellen Pictures with a first look deal at MRC, and served as executive producers on Mastermind: To Think Like a Killer (2024) for Hulu. In 2024, Fanning began filming the Bob Dylan biopic A Complete Unknown, where she portrayed Sylvie Russo.

Fanning stars in Hideo Kojima's 2025 video game, Death Stranding 2: On the Beach, as the character Tomorrow. She also features in the game's soundtrack, in collaboration with French singer-songwriter Woodkid.

In 2025, she starred alongside Renate Reinsve and Stellan Skarsgård in Joachim Trier's dramedy film Sentimental Value, where she plays ambitious Hollywood actress Rachel Kemp. The film debuted at the 2025 Cannes Film Festival and won the Grand Prix. For the role, she received Critics' Choice and Golden Globe nominations in addition to her first Oscar nomination. Also in 2025, she co-starred as Weyland-Yutani android sisters Thia and Tessa in the science-fiction action film Predator: Badlands, which released on November 7 and received generally positive reviews from critics.

Fanning starred in and executive produced the 2026 miniseries Margo's Got Money Troubles as the titular Margo Millet, a young mother who turns to OnlyFans to provide for her infant son. The role earned her critical acclaim and two Primetime Emmy Award nominations: Outstanding Lead Actress in a Comedy Series and Outstanding Comedy Series. The show has since been renewed for a second season. She will next star in the satirical tragicomedy thriller Rosebush Pruning; as Effie Trinket in The Hunger Games: Sunrise on the Reaping; alongside Dakota in The Nightingale, based on Kristin Hannah's book of the same name; and in Rebecca Miller’s biopic about Margaret Wise Brown. She will also star in and executive produce the legal thriller Discretion for Paramount+.

== Personal life ==
From 2018 to 2023, Fanning was in a relationship with English actor Max Minghella. She has been in a relationship with Rolling Stone executive chairman Gus Wenner since late 2023. Their relationship was made public when they attended the 81st Golden Globe Awards together in January 2024.

Fanning moved into her own Los Angeles rental home around 2025, once Margo's Got Money Troubles began filming. She and Wenner divide their time between Los Angeles and an apartment in Greenwich Village, New York City.
