= National Board of Review Awards 2010 =

Annual US film awards ceremony

82nd NBR Awards
Best Film: The Social Network

The 82nd National Board of Review Awards honored the best in film for 2010.

== Top 10 Films ==
Films listed alphabetically except top, which is ranked as Best Film of the Year:

The Social Network

- Another Year
- The Fighter
- Hereafter
- Inception
- The King's Speech
- Shutter Island
- The Town
- Toy Story 3
- True Grit
- Winter's Bone

== Winners ==
Best Film:

- The Social Network

Best Director:

- David Fincher – The Social Network

Best Actor:

- Jesse Eisenberg – The Social Network

Best Actress:

- Lesley Manville – Another Year

Best Supporting Actor:

- Christian Bale – The Fighter

Best Supporting Actress:

- Jacki Weaver – Animal Kingdom

Best Original Screenplay:

- Chris Sparling – Buried

Best Adapted Screenplay:

- Aaron Sorkin – The Social Network

Best Animated Feature:

- Toy Story 3

Best Foreign Film:

- Of Gods and Men

Best Documentary:

- Waiting for "Superman"

Best Ensemble Cast:

- The Town

Breakthrough Performance:

- Jennifer Lawrence – Winter's Bone

Spotlight Award for Best Directorial Debut:

- Sebastian Junger and Tim Hetherington – Restrepo

Special Filmmaking Achievement Award:

- Sofia Coppola, for writing, directing, and producing Somewhere

William K. Everson Film History Award:

- Leonard Maltin

NBR Freedom of Expression:

- Fair Game
- Conviction
- Howl

== Top Foreign Films ==
Of Gods and Men

- I Am Love
- Incendies
- Life, Above All
- Soul Kitchen
- White Material

== Top Documentaries ==
Waiting for "Superman"

- A Film Unfinished
- Inside Job
- Joan Rivers: A Piece of Work
- Restrepo
- The Tillman Story

== Top Independent Films ==
- Animal Kingdom
- Buried
- Fish Tank
- The Ghost Writer
- Greenberg
- Let Me In
- Monsters
- Please Give
- Somewhere
- Youth in Revolt
