= Need to Know (House) =

- House episode
- Episode no.: Season 2 Episode 11
- Directed by: David Semel
- Written by: Pamela Davis
- Original air date: February 7, 2006

Guest appearances
- Sela Ward as Stacy Warner; Currie Graham as Mark Warner; Edward Kerr as Ted Dalton; Elle Fanning as Stella Dalton; Julie Warner as Margo Dalton

Episode chronology
← Previous "Failure to Communicate"	Next → "Distractions"
- House season 2

"Need to Know" is the eleventh episode of the second season of House, which premiered on Fox on February 7, 2006.

== Plot ==
The episode begins by showing Margo Dalton, a "superwife". After a twinge in her arm, she begins an uncontrollable series of muscle spasms. House suspects she may be pregnant, but Margo displays sudden irritability, which confirms Foreman's suspicion of Huntington's disease. Margo has a psychotic breakdown, leading House to suspect that Margo is using cocaine. Cameron and Foreman find Margo's daughter's Ritalin in the car while searching her house for drugs. House tricks Margo into revealing that she never gave her daughter the Ritalin and instead used it herself.

House then visits Stacy, who reveals she's leaving now that Mark is getting better. Margo is discharged, but while leaving she has a stroke and collapses. The team begins to work on diagnosing Margo's new symptoms. House suspects the fertility treatments caused endometrial cancer. On the roof, Stacy meets with House. He wants to know if she is going to tell Mark about their affair, but she stalls.

Margo's initial tests for cancer come back negative, but immediately after his probation ends, House reassumes leadership of the team and orders a biopsy to find the suspected tumor. During Margo's biopsy, she begins to bleed from her uterus. They determine the blood is coming from her liver, leading them to suspect a tumor there instead.

While Stacy goes to Cuddy for advice on how to proceed concerning her situation with House, Mark comes to House asking for advice, concerned that he's shutting Stacy out. House goes up a flight of stairs to avoid him, but Mark tries to follow him and collapses. House refuses to help him.

House is not convinced that the symptoms indicate a liver tumor and suspects that Margo was secretly using birth control pills to negate the fertility treatments. The combination of Ritalin, birth control, and fertility treatments caused the tumor, which House believes should be benign. But Margo still claims she's not taking the pills and insists on undergoing surgery despite the risks. Margo asks Foreman to lie to her husband and claim she cannot take fertility treatments any more, but he refuses.

Cameron goes to House, who has her HIV test results, which are negative. House confronts Stacy, who reveals she's going to leave Mark for House. House tells her it's Mark who is willing to do what it takes, not him, and he cannot make her happy. He worries their relationship will disintegrate once again.
