= Lynda Lytle Holmstrom =

- Born: April 23, 1939
- Died: February 6, 2021 (aged 81)
- Education: Stanford University (BA); Boston University (MA); Brandeis University (PhD)
- Occupation: Sociologist
- Employer: Boston College
- Notable work: The Two-Career Family (1972); Rape: Victims of Crisis (1974) with Ann Burgess; Mixed Blessings: Intensive Care for Newborns with Jeanne Guillemin (1986)
- Spouse: Ross Holmstrom (married 1961)

Lynda Lytle Holmstrom (23 April 1939 – 6 February 2021) was an American sociologist. She was a pioneering researcher in the fields of rape counseling and trauma, and the first woman tenured faculty member in the Department of Sociology at Boston College.

== Early life and education ==
Lynda Lytle was born in Seattle on 23 April 1939, and graduated as valedictorian from Garfield High School in 1957. She attended Stanford University, where she earned her BA in anthropology in 1961. That year, she married Ross Holmstrom, who she had met in Seattle and was a doctoral student in electrical engineering. Her first academic job was as an editorial assistant to two Stanford sociology professors, W. Richard Scott and Edmund Volkart, piquing her own interest in sociology. Their book was published in 1966 as Medical Care, with Holmstrom's assistance acknowledged.

When her husband obtained a position with NASA in Cambridge, Massachusetts, the couple moved to Boston. Holstrom was admitted to Boston University to study for a master's degree in sociology. Among her teachers was Rose Laub Coser. The following year, she began her doctoral study at Brandeis University.

== Early career ==
In 1969, with her doctoral thesis largely complete, Holmstrom accepted a position as an instructor in the Sociology Department at Boston College. On receiving her PhD, she became assistant professor. Holmstrom's thesis, focusing on how married couples pursuing high-level careers navigated professional and family life, became the book, The Two Career Family. The book, based on in-depth interviews with 20 couples, was published in 1972.

Rising through the ranks at Boston College, Holmstrom served as department chair for six years, and taught there for four decades.

== Research ==
Holmstrom worked closely with Connell School of Nursing faculty member Ann Burgess, co-founding with her, in 1972, a rape victim counseling program at Boston City Hospital. This was one of the first such programs to be based in a hospital, and in addition to providing therapeutic services, enabled Holmstrom and Burgess to study the experiences of women who had endured sexual violence. As well as interviews and research, they trained the hospital's nurses in the provision of sympathetic support and counseling, remaining as supervisory consultants for the program. In 1974, they published the landmark study Rape: Victims of Crisis. The book emphasized the significant trauma suffered by victims of rape and its impact on their lives and relationships, as well as highlighting misconceptions and stereotypes commonly perpetrated about these victims.

Based on their research, Holmstrom and Burgess coined the diagnosis "Rape Trauma Syndrome," first published in 1974 in the American Journal of Psychiatry. Their description of the symptoms associated with such trauma used clinical data to challenge prevailing assumptions about the behavior to be expected from victims.

A subsequent work, The Victim of Rape: Institutional Reactions (1978), again co-authored with Burgess was "the first empirical study of rape victims in the United States as they come into contact with the police, the hospital, and the court", detailing how victims' suffering can be affected by the response of these three institutions.

In the 1980s, Holmstrom collaborated with her sociology colleague Jeanne Guillemin to examine the emerging challenge in medical ethics of increased life expectancy for premature babies, measured against quality of life. Holmstrom and Guillemin undertook "the first in-depth study of the approximately 300,000 babies in the 500–600 neonatal intensive care units in the United States", publishing Mixed Blessings: Intensive Care for Newborns in 1986.

== Later years and legacy ==
Holmstrom retired from Boston College as a full-time faculty member in 2009. She died on 6 February 2021 from a cerebral hemorrhage.

Boston College's Sociology Department recognized the contributions of Holmstrom by naming an award after her, awarded to "the best class paper on the topic of gender with sociological implications submitted to an undergraduate course in the Morrissey College of Arts and Sciences each calendar year".

== Selected publications ==
=== Books ===
- The Two-Career Family (1972)
- Rape: Victims of Crisis, co-authored with Ann W. Burgess (1974)
- The Victim of Rape: Institutional Reactions, co-authored with Ann W. Burgess (1978)
- Mixed Blessings: Intensive Care for Newborns, co-authored with Jeanne Guillemin (1986)

=== Articles ===
- "Assessing Trauma in the Rape Victim", Lynda Lytle Holmstrom, Ann Wolbert Burgess in The American Journal of Nursing, Vol. 75, No. 8 (Aug., 1975)
- "Rape: The Husband's and Boyfriend's Initial Reactions", Lynda Lytle Holmstrom, Ann Wolbert Burgess in The Family Coordinator, Vol. 28, No. 3 (Jul., 1979)
- "Leaving Home for College: Expectations for Selective Reconstruction of Self", David A. Karp, Lynda Lytle Holmstrom, Paul S. Cray in Symbolic Interaction, Vol. 21, No. 3 (1998)
- "Why Parents Pay for College: The Good Parent, Perceptions of Advantage, and the Intergenerational Transfer of Opportunity", Lynda Lytle Holmstrom, David A. Karp, Paul S. Gray in Symbolic Interaction, Vol. 34, No. 2 (Spring 2011)
