= Jon B. Simonis =

American serial rapist

- Born: Jon Barry Simonis; January 1951 (age 75); Lake Charles, Louisiana
- Other name: The Ski Mask Rapist
- Occupation: Lab technician
- Height: 6 ft 0 in (183 cm)
- Motive: Robbery, sexual gratification
- Penalty: 21 life sentences; 2,690 years in prison

Details
- Victims: 81 confirmed 130+ suspected
- Span of crimes: 1979–1981
- Country: United States
- States: Louisiana; North Carolina; Michigan; Wisconsin; California; Florida; Mississippi; Oklahoma; Ohio; Texas
- Date apprehended: 1981
- Imprisoned at: Louisiana State Penitentiary

Jon Barry Simonis (born January 1951), also known as the Ski Mask Rapist, is an American serial rapist who committed crimes in 12 states between 1979 and 1981. He confessed to at least 81 attacks and was sentenced to 21 life terms with an additional 2,690 years in prison. Investigators believe they could connect him to 130 attacks across the country.

== Early life ==
Jon B. Simonis grew up in Lake Charles, Louisiana. His family moved to Ohio when his father was transferred to a military base. Simonis was an athlete at Bloom-Carroll High School and graduated in 1969. His school superintendent described him as "a popular boy". He served in the army in Europe from 1973 to 1977 and then returned to Lake Charles. He also worked as a lab technician and an attendant in a cardiology unit. He was reported to have an IQ of 128.

== Crimes ==
At age 15, Simonis began acts of voyeurism, also known as peeping. This escalated in 1973 during his time in the army when he committed sexual assault by exposing himself to women. Simonis claimed all victims during this time had been chosen at random. In 1978, he faced his first conviction for making obscene telephone calls. The judge in this case said he would not face time as long as he sought psychiatric help.

Beginning in 1979, Simonis began breaking into homes, committing burglary, and raping women as he wore a ski mask. He would threaten the women with a weapon. This varied from knives to guns. In the beginning, the motive was money. However, it devolved into achieving sexual gratification by having an enraged husband, boyfriend, or father watch as he raped a woman.

Simonis specifically targeted homes belonging to couples. His modus operandi involved breaking into a home while wearing a ski mask, binding and blindfolding the couples with pre-cut lengths of silver duct tape, and raping the woman when the man was present. If he broke into a home and the man was not there, he may wait with the bound woman until the man returned home before he committed his crime.

If other people were in the home during the attack, they would also be bound and blindfolded. One attack included a 14-year-old babysitter who happened to be in the home of the couple he had targeted. Another attack in Edmond, Oklahoma involved a couple's two children who were in the home during his break-in and attack. According to police, he burst into their home with a pistol. The husband and wife were handcuffed while the children were bound with silver duct tape. All four of them were blindfolded with the tape. He then raped the woman with the family present. Simonis also burned her with cigarettes and then stole the family car in addition with money, jewelry and cameras.

In interviews, Simonis said he would stalk his victims, sometimes for weeks at a time. “I stalked my victims like a hunter stalks deer. It sometimes took weeks to hone my target,” he said. Overall, he targeted victims over a 3-year period.

Detectives reported that two men assisted Simonis in some of these attacks. They were identified as John Dickinson III and Fredrick Boerman Jr. Detectives described them as "weak men shamed into joining in the attacks." Investigators say Dickinson took part in 9 of the 13 Louisiana rapes tied to Simonis, while Boerman was not charged as he was a getaway driver and lookout.

On November 6, 1981, Simonis nearly turned himself in to a Mississippi psychiatric hospital. "I drove up to the front gate," he said. "I wanted help so bad. I got to the front gate and stopped, backed up and left." Two days later, he committed another assault.

== Arrest ==
Throughout the early 1980s, reports of ski mask rapes continued. He became the most wanted sex offender in the country. The FBI Behavioral Science Unit was called in as they feared he may further escalate and commit murder during his attacks. BSU consultant Ann Burgess was sent to Louisiana to interview his victims. Burgess noted he mainly struck women who lived a wealthy lifestyle. In her profile, she stated he would most likely drive a flashy car. This led to law enforcement finding Simonis and ultimately arresting him.

Investigators took note of a young, white male driving a "fancy red Trans-Am". An officer reported seeing the same vehicle near a rape attack. Plainclothes officers followed him for a week. They made the arrest on November 27, 1981 when Simonis was purchasing bread and cigarettes from a store.

Simonis was jailed and had a $4 million bond. At the time, he was only charged with three counts of aggravated rape, four counts of armed robbery, and one count of aggravated burglary. A law enforcement task force was formed to uncover how many states and separate criminal incidents could be tied back to Simonis.

== Trial ==
Simonis made his first court appearance on December 2, 1981. He pled guilty to two counts of armed robbery, one of aggravated robbery, and unauthorized use of a stolen vehicle in a September 17 attack of a couple. The woman was reportedly sexually assaulted. This led to his first sentencing of 231 years with no chance of parole. He was also indicted on seven charges of burglary and sexual assault from an attack on June 7, 1981 that targeted a woman and her 14-year-old daughter. This attack involved his two accomplices.

He then went to plead guilty to the rapes of three Gonzales women during a single incident on October 29, 1981. However, the judge rejected this and ordered a sanity evaluation, as his mental health had not been tested since his arrest. One attorney claimed he may have schizophrenia. However, Simonis himself pushed back against this, saying it would only delay the court proceedings. "I am fully capable of understanding the proceedings," he said. "I fully understood what I was doing. I was competent then, I am still very competent as to my mental capacity. I was fully aware of the consequences. By postponing this now, all the court does is backlog and delay the law enforcement agencies. I would like to proceed and plead guilty." His sanity hearing on December 18, 1981 determined he was sane and allowed to enter guilty pleas.

On December 22, 1981, Simonis plead guilty to seven more attacks. This added on an additional 15 life terms plus 1,389 years in prison. On January 4, 1982, Simonis faced additional charges for an attack that occurred on October 8, 1981. Simonis apologized to the two victims in court. He was sentenced to two consecutive life terms for the rape charges, plus 144 years for the additional charges. On January 6, 1982, Simonis was given 297 years for three armed robbery charges and 40 years for the rape of an 18-year-old woman.

Overall, Simonis confessed to 81 separate crimes. This involved sexual assault and robbery in multiple states. Simonis admitted to committing crimes in Louisiana, North Carolina, Michigan, Wisconsin, California, Florida, Georgia, Mississippi, Oklahoma, Ohio, and Texas. However, a probe failed to show evidence Simonis was ever in Wisconsin.

After Simonis went to trial for each of these crimes, his sentences totaled to 21 life terms with an additional 2,690 years in prison. Since Louisiana had already given him 21 life sentences, Simonis did not face prosecution for 75 charges that occurred in other states.

His admissions led to the exoneration of different men who were wrongfully sentenced for Simonis' crimes. Texas man Clarence Von Williams was serving 50 years for rape charges. Simonis confessed to the crime on video tape and gave specific details that would not be known by another individual, leading investigators to believe Simonis was telling the truth. This led to Williams' exoneration despite the victim, Sally Blackwell, reaffirming that Simonis was not her attacker and that it must be Von Williams. Another Ohio man, Bradley Cox, was incorrectly convicted for Simonis' actions. Cox was given 11 charges consisting of rape, aggravated burglary, and aggravated robbery. Simonis made a written and videotaped confession taking ownership for this incident. After serving two years behind bars, Cox was freed on January 31, 1982 due to Simonis' confession. Cox was eventually awarded $110,000 by the Ohio Court of Claims for his wrongful incarceration.

== Prison ==
Simonis was officially transferred from Hunt Correctional Center to Louisiana State Penitentiary on Jan. 10, 1981 to begin serving his time. The Corrections Department stated he would be confined for an "indefinite period to a maximum-security cell away from the general population" as he was considered an escape risk.

Simonis publicly stated he intended to write books and give the profits to his mother. The books were going to be about self-defense and how to stay protected from criminals. Four local victims of Simonis sued him for more than $1 million, claiming it was to ensure they would receive any profits made from his writings. A judge ruled in the victims' favor on November 16, 1982. Two of his female victims who made the lawsuit were granted $500,000 each should he choose to write a novel. Two of the male victims, who were not sexually assaulted but witnessed the crime, were awarded $50,000 each.

His statements also inspired Louisiana lawmakers to introduce a bill intended to prevent criminals from profiting from their crimes. Louisiana State Representative Margaret Lowenthal introduced the bill, saying, "as hard as it was to refuse the mother of Jon Simonis, I think the provision is only fair ... Jon could have made money within the law to support the family."

Throughout his years in prison, Simonis was interviewed multiple times by FBI profiler Roy Hazelwood. One instance was for the novel The Evil That Men Do, which detailed the profiler's work in serial rape cases. Another long interview with Simonis led to Hazelwood publishing a 1986 FBI bulletin, RAPE: The Dangers of Providing Confrontational Advice. At the end of one of these interviews, Simonis admitted that he most likely would have turned to murder had he not been caught. His case was also included in Ann Burgess' 2022 memoir A Killer by Design: Murderers, Mindhunters, and My Quest to Decipher the Criminal Mind as well as the 2024 Hulu miniseries featuring Burgess' work, Mastermind: To Think Like a Killer.
