= Ann Burgess =

American university teacher

Ann Wolbert Burgess
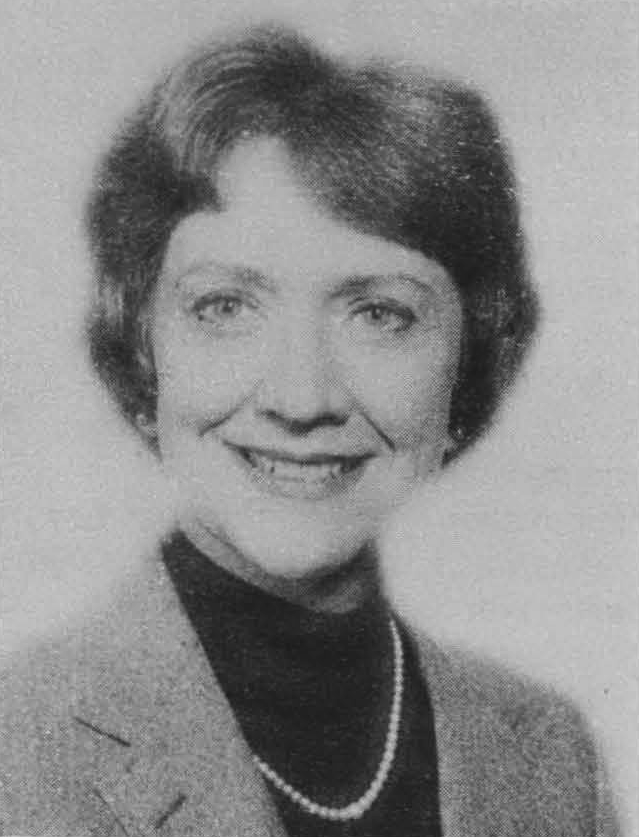
- Burgess c. 1984
- Born: October 2, 1936 (age 90)
- Education: Boston University (B.S.); University of Maryland (M.S.); Boston University (D.N.Sc.)
- Occupation: Professor at Boston College

Ann C. Wolbert Burgess (Note: Middle name also spelled Wolpert) (born October 2, 1936) is an American researcher and psychiatric clinical nurse specialist whose work has focused on victims of trauma and abuse, and is author of A Killer by Design: Murderers, Mindhunters, and My Quest to Decipher the Criminal Mind (2021) and Expert Witness: The Weight of Our Testimony When Justice Hangs in the Balance (2025). She is a professor at the William F. Connell School of Nursing at Boston College and professor emerita at the University of Pennsylvania School of Nursing. She received her master's degree from the University of Maryland and her doctorate from Boston University.

== Early life and education ==
Burgess was born and grew up in Newton, Massachusetts. As a young woman, she said the only career choices for women at that time were to become a nurse, a secretary, or a teacher. She eventually got her nursing degree at Boston University. Burgess received a Bachelor of Science from Boston University, a Master of Science from the University of Maryland, and a Doctor of Nursing Science from Boston University.

== Career ==
Burgess is a doctorally prepared, board-certified psychiatric clinical nurse specialist.

She pioneered assessing and treating trauma in rape victims. Burgess faced criticism regarding her focus on rape victims; despite the commentary about potential damage to her career, she continued her work. She co-founded one of the first hospital-based crisis counseling programs at Boston City Hospital with Boston College sociologist, Lynda Lytle Holmstrom. Together, she and Holmstrom conducted extensive research regarding 1960s rape victims in Boston. She interviewed victims and quantified their experiences. Her and Holmstrom also collaborated on a book called "Rape: Victims of Crisis" which helped to shift the medical and legal view and response to the issue of sexual violence and its impact on the victims. This caught the attention of the Federal Bureau of Investigation. She began to consult for John E. Douglas, Robert Ressler, and other FBI agents in the Behavioral Science Unit (BSU) to develop modern psychological profiling for serial killers. The BSU was interested in doing similar research to Burgess, except with perpetrators rather than victims. Burgess was granted access to the early cassette tapes that were recorded during the first serial killer interviews, such as discussions with Edmund Kemper, Ted Bundy, and Charles Manson. At first, she questioned working with the FBI, as she had four young children and knew it would take up time from her family. However, the importance of the work is what made her agree: "I was feeling pressured to make the right decision. I mean, I didn't care much about the offenders, they were killers. The biggest motivation from my perspective was helping victims. I focused on that as much as I could," she said in the Hulu docuseries "Mastermind: To Think Like A Killer", based on her work. Through interviews and finding patterns among the serial killers, her team was the first to find similar trauma among serial killers. In 1977, she was elected to the American Academy of Nursing. In October 1994, she was elected to the National Academy of Sciences Institute of Medicine. Burgess chaired the 1996 National Research Council's Task Force on Violence against Women, and has testified as an expert witness in 30 states.

=== Jon B. Simonis ===
Burgess first consulted on the Jon B. Simonis case. He was known as Louisiana's 'Ski Mask Rapist' and confessed to over 80 rapes nationwide across 12 states. Burgess was sent to Louisiana to interview his victims. When she first arrived alone and introduced herself as a member of the FBI, authorities called the FBI believing she was impersonating an agent due to her being a woman. As she conducted her interviews, Burgess told the women that they were essential to the investigation, as their information could help catch the offender. She said this is what led so many of them to open up to her, as they realized authorities believed their story. Burgess realized the pattern of victims: women who lived a wealthy lifestyle. She surmised the attacker would be driving a flashy car. The profile her team created with her work led police to arrest Simonis. He was sentenced to 18 life terms and 2,406 years in prison.

=== John Joubert ===
After a young boy was killed in Nebraska, a member of the BSU gave police a profile for who the killer might be. The profile was incorrect and led to a wrong arrest. After a second young boy was killed, establishing that this was a serial killer, Burgess was officially brought into the profiling room. Burgess profiled him as a white man in his early 20s with a weak build. Evidence pointed to his boy victims trusting him, so Burgess profiled that he may be a teacher, coach, or scout leader. Later, it was confirmed that John Joubert was an assistant scout master. Burgess also noted that he may be interested in detective magazines, as that was a common pattern with similar serial killers. Joubert's belongings included a detective magazine that was dog eared on a page about a young newspaper boy being abducted. After being found guilty, Joubert was given the death sentence and was executed.

=== Opal Horton ===
Burgess was called to interview eight-year-old Opal Horton in Illinois. Horton was riding a bike with her friend, Melissa Ackerman, when a man attempted to abduct them and place them in the backseat of his car. Horton was able to escape through a window, but Ackerman was brought into the man's car and had not been found. It was imperative they got as much information from Horton as possible. During the interview, Burgess asked Horton to make drawings of the incident, hoping it would make it easier for the child to communicate. The child drew the crime scene and what she was feeling during the time. Police used Horton's description and sketch of the car that was used during the abduction to arrest Brian Dugan.

=== Menendez brothers ===
Burgess had mainly stepped away from her career by the time she got a call about the Menendez brothers case. She was asked to serve as an expert witness by the defense team. The prosecution claimed the brothers killed their parents for money. Burgess did not think this motive made sense, so she flew out to California to meet with them.

According to Burgess, the first time she was in the room with a killer was when she first met Erik Menendez. She spent around 50 hours interviewing him. As she did with Opal Horton, Burgess asked Erik to draw the crime. She believed this would make it easier for Erik to discuss as it did not require him to look at her directly. Burgess says Erik drew his father as large and controlling. According to Burgess, many of the sketches Erik drew of him and his father took place in the bedroom, which she thought was an "unusual place". She asked for further information about his father and the bedroom, leading Erik to draw a depiction of incestuous, sexual abuse. "They killed their parents. Absolutely no matter what the circumstances are, that's still wrong. But they certainly were abused. I could sympathize with what they had to put up with. And so I decided to testify for the defense," Burgess said. Fellow agents criticized her. John E. Douglas told her directly she was making the wrong choice. However, she felt compelled by the motive: "To me, it was important in terms of getting the truth out about trauma and abuse."

The first trial resulted in a hung jury. During the second trial, Burgess was not allowed to testify because the judge did not allow any expert witnesses who were experts on abuse. "I felt sad for them," said Burgess, "And I still feel that life without the opportunity for parole is wrong. This isn't something they were going to do again. They weren't serial killers."

After seeing her impact on the jury during the first trial, Burgess realized the way she could really help victims was by stepping more into the spotlight and by lending her testimony to trials. She began to accept cases that she felt drawn to.

=== Bill Cosby ===
Burgess was tasked with interviewing Andrea Constand as she began her civil lawsuit against Bill Cosby back in 2005. "She had a job to do. It was to try and pull things from my memory," Constand says. This was difficult, as Constand reports she was drugged by Cosby and was unconscious when assaulted. Besides asking her about the actual event, Burgess asked her about her demeanor before and after the incident. According to Burgess, even if someone was unconscious for most or all of a sexual assault, the body still recounts the trauma and reacts appropriately. The case was settled, but Constand was able to face Cosby again in a criminal case during the MeToo movement as more women came out with similar stories.

=== Impact ===
Overall, Burgess was integral in the development and expansion of the FBI's Behavioral Science Unit. Burgess published books and findings so that behavioral science could be utilized by law enforcement. Even in her late 80s, Burgess continues to teach and work on different cases. In the early 2020s, she conducted a study on missing and murdered Indigenous women.

== Personal life ==
She has 2 sons and 2 daughters with her husband, Allen. She has experience with aviation and flying planes.

She has a granddaughter, Alex, with whom she provides assistance in collecting data on mass shooter manifestos.

== Awards ==
She has received multiple awards and distinctions including being named a Living Legend by the American Academy of Nursing (AAN) in October 2016, and receiving the inaugural Ann Burgess Forensic Nursing Award by the International Association of Forensic Nurses in 2009, Sigma Theta Tau International Audrey Hepburn Award, the AmErikan Nurses Association Hildegard Peplau Award, and the Sigma Theta Tau International Episteme Laureate Award. She received a Bachelor of Science in Nursing (BSN) from Boston University, a Master of Science in Nursing (MSN) from University of Maryland, and a Doctor of Nursing Science (DNSc) from Boston University.

== Selected bibliography ==
The following is a partial list of Burgess's publications.

=== Books ===
- Burgess, Ann Wolpert; Groth, A. Nicholas; Holmstrom, Lynda Lytle; Sgroi, Suzanne M. (1978). Sexual Assault of Children and Adolescents. Lexington Books. ISBN 9780669018929 – via Internet Archive.
- Ressler, Robert K.; Burgess, Ann W.; Douglas, John E. (1988). Sexual Homicide: Patterns and Motives. Lexington, MA: Lexington Books. ISBN 9780669165593 – via Internet Archive.
- Douglas, John E.; Burgess, Ann W.; Burgess, Allen G.; Ressler, Robert K. (2013). Crime Classification Manual: A Standard System for Investigating and Classifying Violent Crime. Wiley. ISBN 9781118421536 – via Internet Archive.
- Burgess, Ann Wolbert; Constantine, Steven Matthew (2021). A Killer by Design: Murders, Mindhunters, and My Quest to Decipher the Criminal Mind. Hachette Books. ISBN 9780306924866.
- Burgess, Ann Wolbert; Constantine, Steven Matthew (2025). Expert Witness: The Weight of Our Testimony When Justice Hangs in the Balance. Grand Central Publishing. ISBN 9780306834042.

== Influence ==
Burgess has been attributed as the inspiration for the character Dr. Wendy Carr, a psychological consultant for the FBI's Behavioral Science Unit in Netflix's TV series Mindhunter. Several liberties were taken with the character of Dr. Carr. In an interview with Newsweek, she commented on Carr's character, stating that she emulated several aspects of Burgess' life correctly, aside from Carr's career in psychology as opposed to Burgess' in nursing. When asked why her profession was changed, Burgess said, "I think they felt they had to give this Wendy Carr an occupation or profession that people would understand, and they didn't understand nursing." Burgess also said that, though Carr's character is a lesbian, Burgess is not.

In 2024, Hulu released a three-part docu-series about Burgess and her work titled Mastermind: To Think Like a Killer.

== Sources ==
- Burgess named AAN Living Legend - Connell School of Nursing - Boston College
- Professor Ann Burgess is the Mind Behind the Mindhunter
- Ann Wolbert Burgess - Connell School of Nursing - Boston College
- Abduction of Opal Horton and Melissa Ackerman - Youtube Video at the Unseen channel. Title: This Is Why Cops Should Listen To Kids
