= Mastermind: To Think Like a Killer =

American true crime documentary series

- Genre: Documentary
- Directed by: Abby Fuller
- Country of origin: United States
- Original language: English
- No. of episodes: 3

Production
- Executive producers: Abby Fuller; Elle Fanning; Dakota Fanning; Ross M. Dinerstein; Dani Sloane; Rebecca Halpern; Lesley Chilcott; Rebecca Evans
- Production companies: Campfire Studios; Lewellen Pictures

Original release
- Network: Hulu
- Release: July 11, 2024

Mastermind: To Think Like a Killer is a 2024 American documentary series directed and produced by Abby Fuller. It explores the career of Ann Burgess, focusing on her work at the FBI developing means of tracking serial killers and other violent criminals based on her novel research into their behaviors.

It had its world premiere at Tribeca Festival on June 7, 2024. It premiered on July 11, 2024, on Hulu.

== Premise ==
The series explores the career of Ann Burgess, looking into her widely known and lesser-known cases. The series follows Burgess and her investigations at the FBI into serial killers and their victims.

== Production ==
In April 2023, it was announced Abby Fuller would direct and executive produce alongside Elle Fanning and Dakota Fanning a documentary series revolving around Ann Burgess for Hulu, with Burgess serving as a consulting producer.

=== Episodes ===
No. overall	No. in season	Title	Directed by	Original release date
1	1	"To Listen to A Killer"	Abigail Fuller	July 11, 2024
Dr. Ann Burgess studies the damaged psyches of sexual assault victims and their attackers (like Ted Bundy and Montie Rissell) and helps the investigators to catch Jon B. Simonis.
2	2	"To Hunt a Killer"	Abigail Fuller	July 11, 2024
While balancing her life as a mother of four, the Behavior Science Unit and Robert Ressler reach out to her. She helps to create psychological profiling for the police in the cases of John Joubert and Brian Dugan.
3	3	"To Defend a Killer"	Abigail Fuller	July 11, 2024
Ann publishes her groundbreaking study and starts to remove from the spotlight. Until she is asked to be an expert witness during the Menendez brothers trial.
