= Mary Shelley (film) =

2017 period-drama film

- Theatrical release poster
- Directed by: Haifaa al-Mansour
- Written by: Emma Jensen
- Produced by: Amy Baer; Ruth Coady; David Grumbach; Alan Moloney
- Starring: Elle Fanning; Douglas Booth; Bel Powley; Ben Hardy; Tom Sturridge; Maisie Williams; Stephen Dillane; Joanne Froggatt
- Cinematography: David Ungaro
- Edited by: Alex Mackie
- Music by: Amelia Warner
- Production companies: HanWay Films; BFI; Parallel Films; Gidden Media; Irish Film Board; Film Fund Luxembourg; Head Gear Films; Metrol Technology; Juliette Films; Ralifish Films
- Distributed by: Curzon Artificial Eye (United Kingdom & Ireland); IFC Films (United States); Transmission Films (Australia)
- Release dates: September 9, 2017 (TIFF); May 25, 2018 (United States); July 6, 2018 (United Kingdom)
- Running time: 121 minutes
- Countries: Australia; United Kingdom; Ireland; United States; Luxembourg
- Language: English
- Box office: $1.9 million

Mary Shelley is a 2017 romantic period-drama film directed by Haifaa al-Mansour and written by Emma Jensen. The plot follows Mary Shelley's first love and her romantic relationship with the poet Percy Bysshe Shelley, which inspired her to write her 1818 novel Frankenstein; or, The Modern Prometheus. An international co-production, the film stars Elle Fanning as Shelley, with Maisie Williams, Douglas Booth, Bel Powley, and Ben Hardy in supporting roles.

The film had its world premiere at the Toronto International Film Festival on September 9, 2017. It was released in the United States on May 25, 2018, by IFC Films, and in the United Kingdom on July 6 by Curzon Artificial Eye.

== Plot ==
Mary Godwin is the daughter of the pioneering feminist writer Mary Wollstonecraft and her husband, the publisher William Godwin. Mary Wollstonecraft had died shortly after giving birth, and when the film opens 16 years later Mary Godwin is living with her father, her stepmother (with whom she has a strained relationship), and her stepsister and close confidante Claire Clairmont.

Mary's stepmother insists that Mary be sent away. Wanting to give Mary her freedom, William sends her to stay with a good friend in Scotland. There Mary meets and falls in love with the radical and unconventional poet Percy Bysshe Shelley, who is already married.

Mary is summoned back on the pretext that Claire is dying; on her arrival, Claire admits that this was a ruse to secure Mary’s return. William introduces Shelley as a new pupil, and Shelley and Mary continue their relationship. Mary and Claire are confronted in the street by Shelley’s wife who asks Mary to keep away from him. Mary denies any involvement, stating that he is merely her father’s pupil. Shelley tells Mary that he loves her alone, and that he has nothing to do with his wife and child other than providing for them financially.

Mary and Shelley elope, taking Claire with them. Shelley has little money of his own, but borrows against his wealthy father's estate to set themselves up in lavish style in Bloomsbury. At a dinner party, Shelley flirts with Claire, and Mary meets one of Shelley's friends who later makes advances towards her. When she complains about his flirting, Shelley tells Mary that in his view lovers should be free. He wants her to take other partners, and demands the same freedom for himself. He calls her a hypocrite, and she expresses her disappointment in him. Mary, Claire and Shelley attend a public display of galvanism in which a dead frog is made to twitch by the application of electricity. Also in the audience is the handsome and famous poet Lord Byron. Claire introduces herself, and is smitten.

One night, Shelley's creditors arrive unexpectedly, and Mary, Claire and Shelley have to flee in the pouring rain. They take up cheap lodgings. Mary gives birth, but her baby does not survive for long. Claire announces that she is pregnant by Byron, and that he has invited them all to stay with him at a villa near Geneva. When they arrive, Byron makes it clear that the "invitation" is little more than Claire's wishful thinking. Nevertheless, he asks them to stay.

The poor weather keeps them indoors for days, and one evening out of boredom Byron challenges the group along with John William Polidori to write a ghost story, a task which captures Mary's imagination and causes her to dream of galvanism. A message arrives for Shelley informing him that his wife has just drowned herself. Throughout the visit, Byron treats Claire with increasing contempt. She loses patience and confronts him, but he laughingly responds that his affair with her was a mere dalliance, "a lapse in judgement". He says that he will provide financially for her child, but nothing more.

The three return to their lodgings in England, and Mary starts to write a novel, Frankenstein. Polidori starts work on "The Vampyre". Increasing stresses drive Mary and Shelley apart. No publisher will take the work under Mary's name as it is considered unsuitable subject-matter for a lady, but with the addition of a foreword by Shelley it is eventually accepted for anonymous publication. The book is a success, and Shelley is initially given the credit until he publicly discloses the true author. The couple reconnect.

Mary's father arranges for a second publication of Frankenstein under her own name, ensuring that she derives an income from it. In the last scene of the film Mary, dressed in black, is seen walking with a young son. An afterword explains that Mary and Shelley had married, and that they stayed together until Shelley's death at the age of 29. Mary never remarried.

== Cast ==
- Elle Fanning as Mary Shelley
- Douglas Booth as Percy Bysshe Shelley
- Tom Sturridge as Lord Byron
- Bel Powley as Claire Clairmont
- Stephen Dillane as William Godwin
- Ben Hardy as John William Polidori
- Maisie Williams as Isabel Baxter
- Joanne Froggatt as Mary Jane Clairmont
- Derek Riddell as William Baxter
- Hugh O'Conor as Samuel Taylor Coleridge

== Production ==
Mary Shelley (changed from the original title, A Storm in the Stars, in January 2017) is based on an original screenplay by Australian screenwriter Emma Jensen. Jensen received development funding from Screen NSW and Screen Australia to develop the screenplay to first draft and her US agents, United Talent Agency, sold the screenplay to US producer Amy Baer. Director Haifaa al-Mansour was set to direct the film.

The casting process went from 2014 to 2016. Elle Fanning was cast in the film to play Mary Shelley. The Diary of a Teenage Girl star Bel Powley joined the film to play Claire Clairmont, Mary's stepsister, who complicates the relationship between both lovers. Douglas Booth was cast in the film to play the role of Percy, while HanWay Films was on board to produce the film and handle the film's international sales. Ben Hardy joined the film, which would be also produced by Alan Moloney and Ruth Coady of Parallel Films. Tom Sturridge, Maisie Williams, Stephen Dillane, and Joanne Froggatt joined the cast.

Principal photography began on February 20, 2016, in Dublin, Ireland. On March 7, the production moved to Luxembourg.

== Release ==
The film had its world premiere at the Toronto International Film Festival on September 9, 2017. Shortly after, IFC Films and Curzon Artificial Eye acquired U.S. and U.K. distribution rights to the film, respectively. The film had its American premiere at the Tribeca Film Festival on April 28, 2018. It was released in the United States on May 25, and in the United Kingdom on July 6.

== Reception ==
=== Box office ===
Mary Shelley grossed $97,321 in the United States and Canada, and $1.8 million in other territories, for a worldwide total of $1.9 million.

=== Critical response ===
On review aggregator Rotten Tomatoes, the film has an approval rating of 41% based on 130 reviews, with an average rating of 5.6/10. The website's critical consensus reads, "Mary Shelley smooths out its subject's fascinating life and fails to communicate the spark of her classic work, undermining fine period detail and a solid Elle Fanning performance". On Metacritic, the film has a weighted average score of 49 out of 100, based on 28 critics, indicating "mixed or average reviews". Some historians have also criticized the movie for its portrayal of Shelley's relationships and for its historical accuracy in general.
