= Somewhere (film) =

2010 film directed by Sofia Coppola

- Theatrical release poster
- Directed by: Sofia Coppola
- Written by: Sofia Coppola
- Produced by: G. Mac Brown; Roman Coppola; Sofia Coppola
- Starring: Stephen Dorff; Elle Fanning
- Cinematography: Harris Savides
- Edited by: Sarah Flack
- Music by: Phoenix
- Production companies: Pathé Distribution; Medusa Film; Tohokushinsha; American Zoetrope
- Distributed by: Focus Features (United States); Pathé Distribution (France); Tohokushinsha (Japan)
- Release dates: September 11, 2010 (Venice); December 22, 2010 (United States)
- Running time: 98 minutes
- Countries: United States; France; Japan
- Language: English
- Budget: $7 million
- Box office: $14.8 million

Somewhere is a 2010 drama film written and directed by Sofia Coppola. The film follows Johnny Marco (played by Stephen Dorff), a newly famous actor, as he recuperates from a minor injury at the Chateau Marmont, a well-known Hollywood retreat. Despite money, fame, and professional success, Marco is trapped in an existential crisis and has an emotionally empty daily life. When his ex-wife suffers an unexplained breakdown and goes away, she leaves Cleo (Elle Fanning), their 11-year-old daughter, in his care. They spend time together and her presence helps Marco mature and accept adult responsibility. The film explores boredom among Hollywood stars, the father–daughter relationship and offers an oblique comedy of show business, particularly Hollywood filmmaking and the life of a "star".

Somewhere premiered at the 67th Venice International Film Festival, where it received the Golden Lion award for best picture, and it was released to theaters in December 2010. Critical opinion was generally positive. Critics praised the patience of the film's visual style and its empathy for a handful of characters, but some felt that Somewhere repeated themes in Coppola's previous work or that its protagonist was less than sympathetic.

== Plot ==
As the film opens, a black Ferrari circles on a race track in the desert, roaring in and out of the shot. When it eventually stops, Johnny Marco steps out. Marco is a recently divorced Hollywood actor who, despite his rise to fame, does not feel much meaning in his daily life. He resides at the Chateau Marmont in Los Angeles, where he is nursing a broken wrist in a plaster arm cast.

Despite drinking and socializing occasionally with Sammy, a fellow actor and childhood friend, Marco spends much of his time alone, driving his car, drinking beer and taking pills, watching a pair of pole-dancing twins perform in his rooms, and having casual sex with various women and aspiring starlets. He receives an unexpected visit from his 11-year-old daughter Cleo.

Johnny completes various publicity obligations for his new film: he is photographed with his contemptuous co-star and gives an interview to the press. Cleo's stay changes his lifestyle little at first. They spend time together in his room and he brings her with him on a publicity trip to Milan, where they stay in a lavish hotel suite and he has a blonde woman as an overnight guest. He is awarded with a "Telegatto" on a television show in which local celebrities play themselves. He helps Cleo prepare for summer camp, takes her on a gambling trip to Las Vegas, and hires a helicopter to drop her off at the camp.

After their time together, Johnny's fatherly emotions emerge and force him to re-assess his otherwise "successful" life. He calls his ex-wife and tearfully breaks down, admitting to his inadequacies and unhappiness. His ex-wife seems indifferent and declines his request to come see him. Johnny checks out of the hotel, promising not to return, and drives his Ferrari into the countryside. Eventually, he stops by the roadside and gets out, leaving behind his Ferrari and walking down the highway with a faint smile on his face.

== Cast ==
- Stephen Dorff as Johnny Marco
- Elle Fanning as Cleo, Johnny's daughter
- Chris Pontius as Sammy, a fellow actor and childhood friend of Johnny
- Lala Sloatman as Layla, Johnny's ex-wife and mother of Cleo
- Michelle Monaghan as Rebecca, an actress playing co-star to Johnny
- Kristina and Karissa Shannon as pole-dancing twins Bambi and Cindy
- Amanda Anka as Marge
- Ellie Kemper as Claire
- Nunzio Alfredo D'Angieri as Pupi
- Laura Chiatti as Sylvia
- Romulo Laki as Romulo

== Production ==
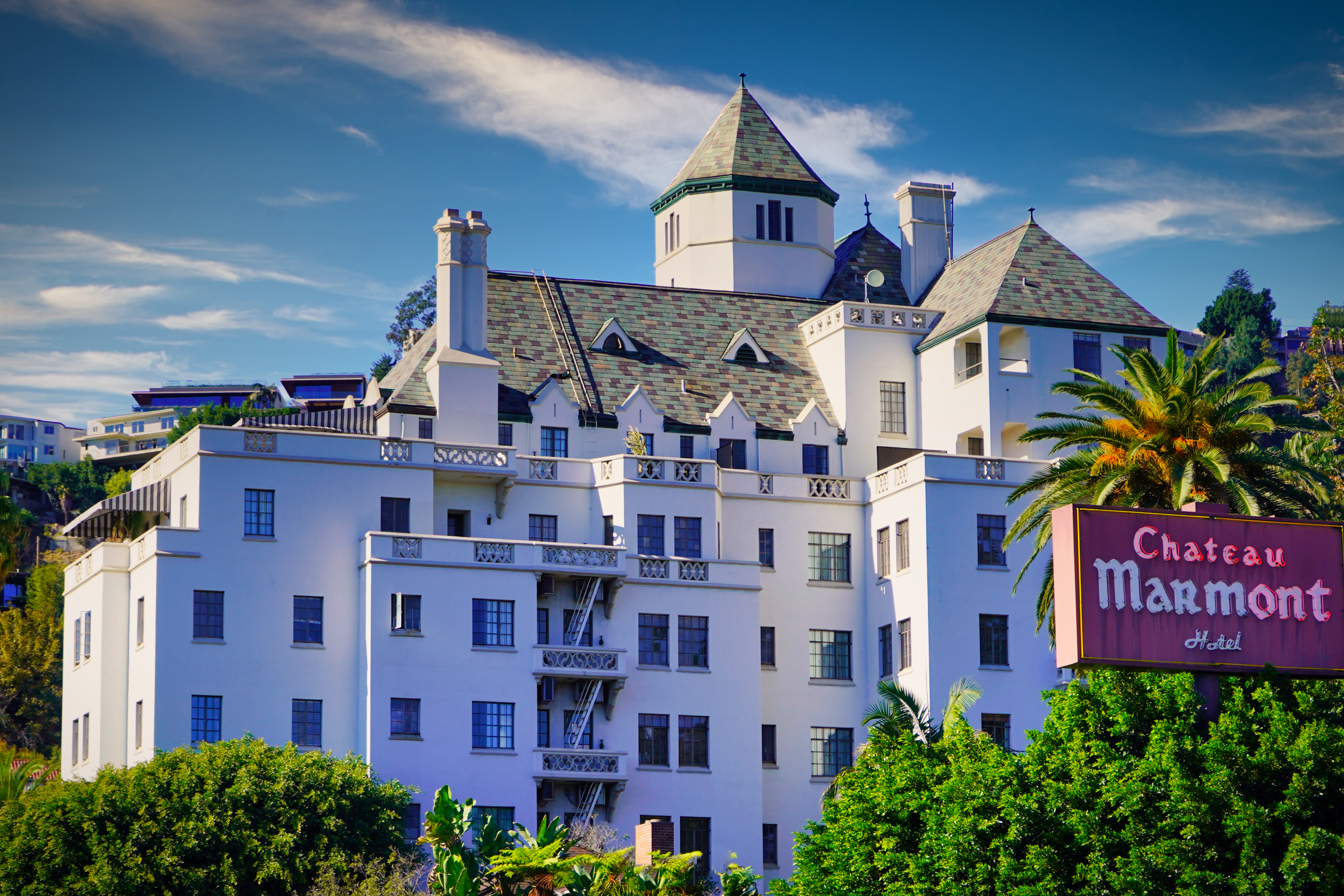
Somewhere was set in and filmed on location at the Chateau Marmont hotel in Los Angeles.

=== Conception ===
The film was inspired in part by a trip to Italy the director took with her father Francis Ford Coppola. The parental focus of the film developed because Coppola had recently had her second child. However, Coppola denied it was an autobiography, pointing out her childhood in a small northern Californian town being raised by married parents is different from that of the character of Cleo, whom she based on a friend's daughter whose parents work in Hollywood. Federico Fellini's Toby Dammit (1968), a favorite film of the director's which she screened several times for lead Stephen Dorff, was also an influence.

[T]he Chateau Marmont is truly a symbol of life in Los Angeles, a place where you can bump into all the actors and where sometimes someone takes refuge in moments of personal or professional crisis.

— Coppola in an interview with Corriere della Sera, August 2009

=== Casting ===
==== Johnny ====
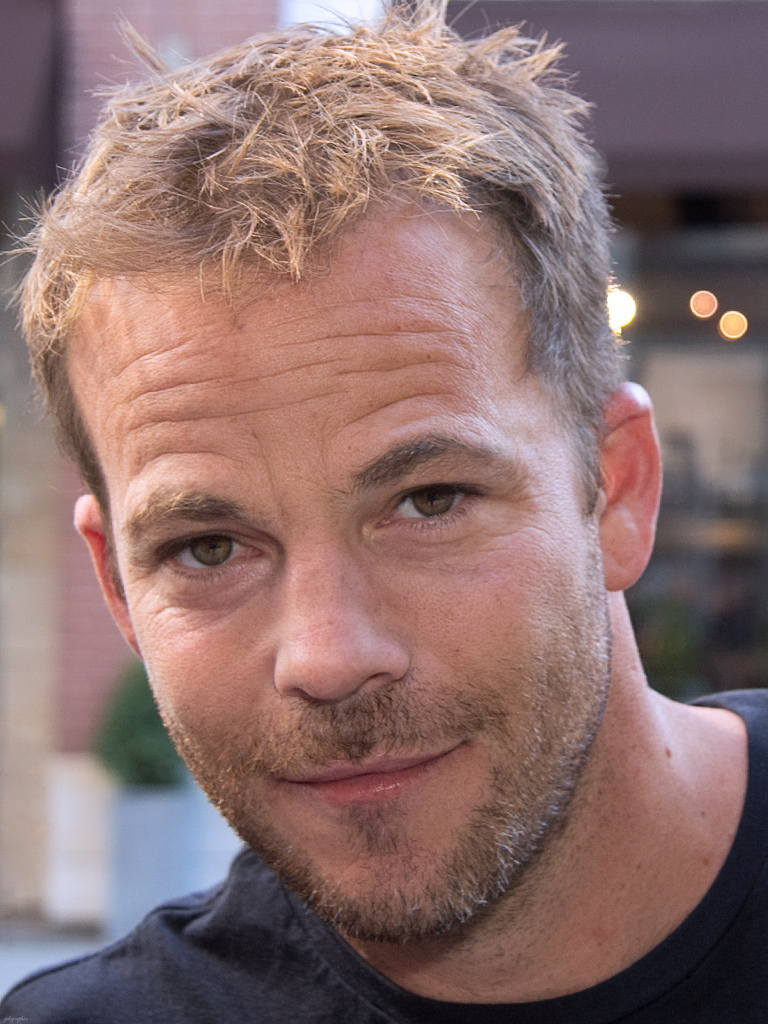
Stephen Dorff, who played the lead role of Johnny Marco, pictured at the 2012 Toronto International Film Festival.

In casting the lead role of Johnny Marco, Coppola met with Leonardo DiCaprio, but from an early stage of writing had her old acquaintance Stephen Dorff in mind. Coppola was drawn to Dorff by his "bad-boy actor" aura and also what she considered "this really sweet, sincere side".

Dorff had emerged as a television actor in the mid-1980s before becoming a film star in the mid-90s, and had lived for several months at the Chateau Marmont, where he celebrated his 21st birthday. He earned the bad boy reputation in the process, and was soon after typecast in genre films such as Space Truckers and Quantum Project, culminating in his role as the antagonist in sci-fi horror Blade (1998), after which he struggled to get considered for serious roles.

Coppola called Dorff to ask him to read the script on what happened to be the one year anniversary of the death of his mother, who had encouraged him to expand beyond his villainous roles. Dorff flew to Paris to discuss the project with her, and on his final day there she told him he had the part. The parallels between Dorff's career and Johnny Marco's backstory made Dorff an appealing choice for the lead. Dorff commented:

“I know what it’s like to live as an actor like Johnny Marco. I get who he is. I’ve had times where I’ve coasted. When we meet him, Johnny is lost in a monotonous rhythm and a decadent lifestyle. He’s a nice guy, but he’s drinking and popping pills. I don’t think he’s proud of a lot of the films he’s done – like his new one, Berlin Agenda. He hasn’t gotten his Somewhere yet.

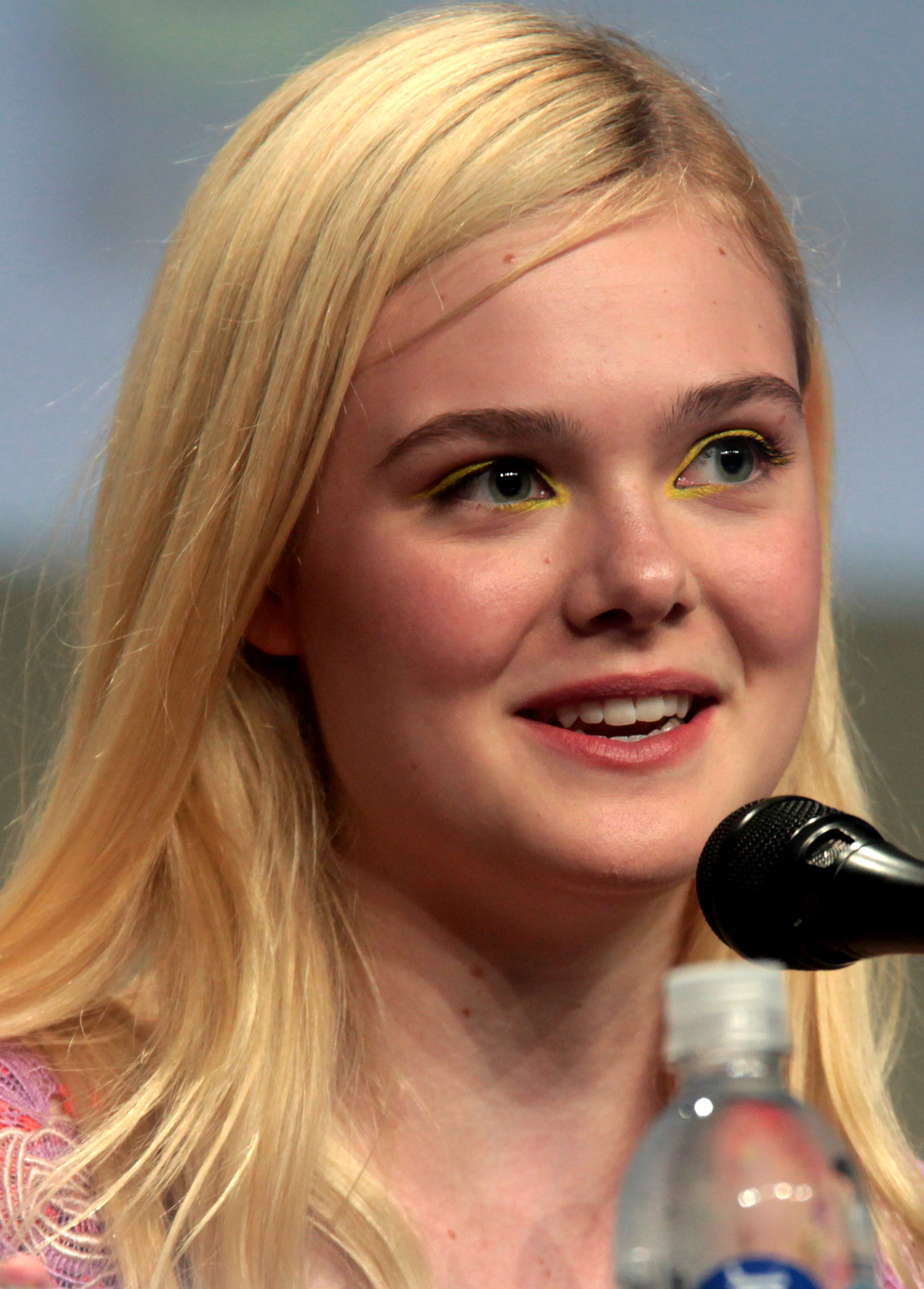
Elle Fanning, who played Johnny's daughter Cleo, pictured at the 2014 San Diego Comic Con International.

==== Cleo ====
Elle Fanning was the front-runner to be cast as Marco's daughter Cleo, and after a day of screen-testing with the already cast Dorff, was offered the role. Fanning and Dorff spent time together before filming to bond. Fanning noted commonalities between the actors: that they were both from the state of Georgia, attended the same school, and were compulsive nail biters.

Dorff, Fanning, and Lala Sloatman (who plays Marco's ex-wife) improvised meals and fights to understand the family's dynamic. During principal photography, Dorff stayed in the Chateau Marmont, making it easier to get to the set and understand the character. Coppola also showed Dorff Paper Moon (1973), a film about an unconventional bond between a feckless father and his daughter, during production.

==== Supporting cast ====
Chris Pontius, famous as a member of the raucous slapstick Jackass collective, had also been known to Coppola for years before she approached him to play the role of Marco's friend Sam. He drew on his improvisational work in Jackass to expand upon the sparse lines in the script for his character. Kristina and Karissa Shannon were Playboy models, brought to Coppola's attention by a friend, who were told nothing about their characters before being cast as twin poledancers. Benicio del Toro, Erin Wasson and members of the band Rooney have cameos in the film.

=== Visual development ===
Coppola wanted a minimalist look for the film, especially after the mixed reactions to her richly costumed Marie Antoinette. The overall effect was to be "sweet and genuine but without being sappy." For the visual style she discussed Bruce Weber's Hollywood portraits and Helmut Newton's photographs of models at the Chateau Marmont, and Jeanne Dielman, 23 quai du Commerce, 1080 Bruxelles (1975), a film by Chantal Akerman about the routine of a Belgian housewife, with Harris Savides, the cinematographer. He said, "The main thing was to tell the story really simply and let it play out in long beats and have the audience discover the moment." Coppola used the lenses that her father had used to film Rumble Fish (1983) in an effort to give the film a more period look, although it is set in the present.

Filming took place in Los Angeles and Italy in June and July 2009. In a feature for The New York Times website, Coppola discussed making the scene when Marco visits a special effects studio. She said she initially was unsure of how to approach it, but Savides did a long, slow zoom which captures his breathing and creates a sense of claustrophobia. Despite many takes, Dorff was a "good sport", she said. The sound of the phone ringing was added by Sarah Flack, the editor, to indicate that Marco has been forgotten.

=== Music ===
Phoenix, a French rock band, contributed to the film's score. The band's singer Thomas Mars is Coppola's husband whom she met when he contributed to a song by Air on the soundtrack to her debut film The Virgin Suicides (1999). She liked the Phoenix songs "Love Like a Sunset Part I" and "Love Like a Sunset Part II" and requested the band do similar music for the film. In 2010 the film score for Somewhere was announced, but remains unreleased.

"It's very minimal," says Mars. "It's almost like sound design. It wasn't like writing songs, it was more about trying to make a sound that fits with a Ferrari and the city of Los Angeles's theme. It was more of an engineer work than a composer."

— Interview with Thomas Mars of the band Phoenix, by Newsbeat, February 2010

==== Track listing ====
1. "Love Like a Sunset Part I" – Phoenix
2. "Gandhi Fix" – William Storkson
3. "My Hero" – Foo Fighters
4. "So Lonely" – The Police
5. "1 Thing" – Amerie
6. "20th Century Boy" – T. Rex
7. "Cool" – Gwen Stefani
8. "Che si fa" – Paolo Jannacci
9. "Teddy Bear" – Romulo
10. "Love Theme From Kiss" – Kiss
11. "I'll Try Anything Once" – Julian Casablancas
12. "Look" – Sebastien Tellier
13. "Smoke Gets In Your Eyes" – Bryan Ferry
14. "Massage Music" – William Storkson
15. "Love Like a Sunset Part II" – Phoenix

== Themes and interpretation ==
=== Celebrity ennui ===
Coppola's early films examine feminine self-definition and maturation, usually in privileged circumstance. Lost in Translation (2003) depicts an encounter and brief friendship between two lonely Americans in a luxurious Tokyo hotel; Marie Antoinette (2006), a stylized biopic of the eponymous queen, examined her loneliness. Somewhere examines similar themes of success and isolation, but from a male perspective. The film explores Marco's seclusion and depression despite his outward professional success and the resulting wealth and fame. He appears to suffer from anhedonia, the inability to feel pleasure, but the film itself is reticent in suggesting its causes. "He believes he's nothing", summarized film critic Roger Ebert, "and it appears he's correct". The film's opening shot, a Ferrari circling a race-track in and out of a stationary camera position, its whine and roar rising and falling, establishes the theme of ennui. The sequence's length also offers a visual cue from Coppola to relax, observe and withhold expectations. Coppola said she wanted to hint at this with a simple camera set-up, "so you're alone with this guy and not aware that it's a movie. But I hope it's a welcome contrast to the style of most movies out there. Something that gives you a chance to take a breath".

The Chateau Marmont, a well-known retreat for Hollywood celebrities, is the film's setting and can be "either a paradise of easy wish-fulfillment or a purgatory of celebrity anomie" (A.O. Scott), but Coppola subtly conveys the emptiness of Marco's situation without denying its appeal. Coppola has stayed at the hotel, and said "I've seen a few Johnny Marcos"; in contrast, writing the part of the daughter, she drew on childhood experiences with her director father, Francis Ford Coppola, such as attending film festivals, though she denied the film was autobiographical. Coppola said that cultural depictions of fame are unbalanced, and at a time when so many strive for it she is trying to show a different side of it.

=== Parenthood ===
Coppola mentioned that the parental angle was inspired by the birth of her second child. As the film progresses the "tender and temporary" father–daughter relationship comes to the fore. Marco has partial custody of his daughter from a failed marriage. Ebert speculates that she probably understands the reasons for the split better than he, and wonders why the child must suffer his hedonism and "detached attempts at fatherhood". In some ways Cleo—having grown up inside the Hollywood bubble—mothers her father, cooking for him and being more worldly aware, but she also watches him with the wide-eyed adoration of a child.

=== Comedy of show business ===
Coppola comes from a family of filmmakers and actors, and she has said how childhood memories of living in hotels partially inspired her choice of setting. Somewhere presents a detailed portrait of life in that industry and charts its existential and emotional boundaries. While celebrity gossip websites inform us of the shallowness of much of "star life", Coppola's feature differs in its emotional depth. She wanted to depict Marco working, but not on a film set. Instead he is shown giving interviews, being photographed, attending an awards ceremony in Italy, and having special effects make-up applied. When Marco attends the special-effects department his face is covered in latex, the camera then very slowly, hypnotically zooms in. Marco is obliged to use his "star" recognition to help promote his new film, and when his publicist calls he becomes passive and mechanically takes the arranged chauffeured car and speaks to the press. In part, the humor derives from Marco's subdued response to these attentions, and Coppola's offbeat observation of people around him. At the Venice Film Festival, critics highlighted the repetition of characters in a cloistered existence in Coppola's films, to which she responded, "I feel like everyone should tell what they know in the world that they know".

== Release ==
=== Venice International Film Festival ===
Somewhere premiered at the 67th Venice International Film Festival on September 3, 2010, and it was released in Italy on the same day. At the festival's close (September 11), the jury unanimously awarded Somewhere the Golden Lion, the festival's prize for the best overall film. Quentin Tarantino, president of the jury, said the film "grew and grew in our hearts, in our minds, in our affections" after the first screening.

=== Theatrical distribution ===
Focus Features distributed Somewhere in North America and most other territories. Pathé released the film in France on January 5, 2011, while Tohokushinsha distributed it in Japan. Medusa Film has rights in Italy. Somewhere was released on December 10, 2010, in both Ireland and the United Kingdom, and on December 22 in North America.

=== Box office performance ===
In its debut weekend in the United States, the film opened in seven theaters with $119,086, averaging $17,012 per cinema. As of February 2011, it has grossed $1,785,645 in the United States and US$13,936,909 worldwide. In the United Kingdom, Somewhere went on limited release to 62 cinemas. It earned £126,000 in the first weekend, of December 10, 2010. Its average per screen, £2,026, was higher than Coppola's earlier small film openings, Marie Antoinette (2006) and The Virgin Suicides (1999). However, it was a lesser total taking. In France, Somewhere earned 401,511 EUR in the three weeks to January 25, 2011.

== Reception ==
Somewhere received positive reviews. The film holds a 71% approval rating on Rotten Tomatoes, based on 196 reviews. The critical consensus states: "It covers familiar territory for Sofia Coppola, but Somewhere remains a hypnotic, seductively pensive meditation on the nature of celebrity, anchored by charming performances from Stephen Dorff and Elle Fanning". The film also has a score of 67 out of 100 on Metacritic based on 40 reviews.

Sight & Sound magazine, published by the British Film Institute, described Somewhere as "going round in circles" and noted that many viewers would "write off Coppola's film as the whining of the privileged", but also acknowledged "a delicate portrait of a still-maturing pre-teen daughter". During the 2010 National Board of Review Awards, Coppola was given the Special Filmmaking Achievement Award for writing, directing and producing Somewhere.

Roger Ebert, writing in the Chicago Sun-Times, awarded the film four out of four stars and praised the detail in the portrait of Johnny Marco, saying "Coppola is a fascinating director. She sees, and we see exactly what she sees. There is little attempt here to observe a plot. All the attention is on the handful of characters, on Johnny." A.O. Scott in The New York Times called the film "exquisite, melancholy and formally audacious" and said "This is not a matter of imitation, but rather of mastery, of finding — by borrowing if necessary — a visual vocabulary suited to the story and its environment. If you pay close attention, "Somewhere" will show you everything." Peter Bradshaw disagreed in The Guardian, awarding the film two stars from five. He praised the cinematic technique but said that the film resembled Lost in Translation too closely, lacked emotional depth and that even on second viewing "the question of why we should really care or be interested remains tantalisingly unanswered"; the final shot failed to solve any emotional problems and "really is one of the daftest things I have seen for a long time."

Allociné, a French cinema website, calculated a score of 2.9 stars out of 5 from twenty-six press reviews. French newspaper Le Monde gave the film a positive review, saying Somewhere was Coppola's most minimalist and daring film. Coppola's films, it said, deal with "the delicate irony of the delinquency of a universe of the happy few", which is both to her credit and a ghost which haunts her, a loyalty ensnaring her. France 24 said the "virtuosity of Coppola is also in her keeping empathy for the characters without pouring out mushy sentiment." Richard Roeper listed Somewhere as one of the top ten films of 2010.

=== Legacy ===
In 2019, The New Yorker film critic Richard Brody included Somewhere in his list of the 27 best films of the decade.

=== Accolades ===
Award	Date of ceremony	Category	Recipient(s)	Result	Ref.
Alliance of Women Film Journalists	10 January 2011	Best Woman Director	Sofia Coppola	Nominated	
Alliance of Women Film Journalists	10 January 2011	Best Woman Screenwriter	Sofia Coppola	Nominated	
Bodil Awards	20 February 2011	Best American Film	Somewhere	Nominated	
Critics Choice Awards	14 January 2011	Best Young Actor/Actress	Elle Fanning	Nominated	
International Cinephile Society	17 February 2011	Best Supporting Actress	Elle Fanning	Runner-up	
National Board of Review	2010	Top Independent Films	Somewhere	Won	
National Board of Review	2010	Special Achievement Award	Sofia Coppola	Won	
National Society of Film Critics	8 January 2011	Best Cinematography	Harris Savides	3rd place	
Venice Film Festival	11 September 2010	Golden Lion	Somewhere	Won	
Young Hollywood Awards	20 May 2011	Actress of the Year Award	Elle Fanning	Won	
