= Stacy (given name) =

- Pronunciation: /ˈsteɪsiː/ STAY-see
- Gender: Unisex
- Language: English

Origin
- Language: Greek
- Origin: 1. Anastasia; 2. Eustace
- Meaning: "Bountiful grain" "Resurrection"
- Region of origin: Greece

Other names
- Alternative spelling: Stacey; Staicee; Stacie; Staci; Stacii
- Nicknames: Stace, Stac, Sta, Stack
- Related names: Eustachius, Eustace, Anastasia, Eustacia, Stasha, Stasia, Tracy, Lacy, Macy

Stacy, sometimes spelled Stacey, Staci, Stacie, or Stacii, is a common first name for women and men. It is also sometimes used as a surname.

Baby-naming guides cite two English derivations of Greek origins: Anastasia, meaning "resurrection", for girls, and Eustace (Eustathios), meaning "steadfast", for boys.

== Notable male people with the name ==
=== Stacey ===
- Stacey Arceneaux (1936–2015), American NBA player
- Stacey Augmon (born 1968), American NBA player
- Stacey B. Day (born 1927), British educator and physician
- Stacey Bailey (born 1960), American former NFL player
- Stacey Blades (born 1968), Canadian heavy metal guitarist
- Stacey Campfield (born 1968), American politician
- Stacey David (born 1963), American television personality and host
- Stacey Dillard (born 1968), American former NFL player
- Stacey Fitts (born 1962), American politician
- Stacey Grimaldi (1790–1863), English lawyer and antiquary
- Stacey Hairston (born 1967), American gridiron football coach and former player
- Stacey Hassard, Canadian politician
- Stacey Hawkins, American air force lieutenant general
- Stacey Ili (born 1991), Samoan rugby union player
- Stacey Katu (born 1983), Cook Island former NRL player
- Stacey King (born 1967), American sports announcer and retired NBA player
- Stacey Koon (born 1950), American convicted criminal and former police sergeant
- Stacey Madden (born 1982), Canadian writer
- Stacey Mack (born 1975), American former NFL player
- Stacey Muruthi (born 1952), Singaporean cricketer of Indian descent
- Stacey North (born 1964), English former professional footballer
- Stacey Pickering (born 1968), American politician and public official
- Stacey Pullen, American techno musician
- Stacey Ross (born 1973), English former professional squash player
- Stacey Simmons (American football) (born 1968), American former NFL player
- Stacey Spiegel (born 1955), Canadian artist and new media designer
- Stacey Thomas (American football) (born 1984), American NFL player
- Stacey Toran (1961–1989), American NFL player

=== Stacy ===
- Stacy Adams (American football) (born 1966), American former football coach
- Stacy Andrews (born 1981), American former NFL player
- Stacy Aumonier (1877–1928), British short story writer, novelist, and stage performer
- Stacy Barcroft Lloyd Jr. (1908–1994), American businessman, horse breeder, dairy cattle farmer, and yachtsman
- Stacy Bragger (born 1984), Falkland Island journalist and politician
- Stacy Burk, American country singer-songwriter, photographer, producer, and creative artist
- Stacy Coldicott (born 1974), English former professional footballer
- Stacy Coley (born 1994), American NFL player
- Stacy Collins (born 1975), American football coach and former player
- Stacy Compton (born 1967), American NASCAR driver
- Stacy Curtis (born 1971), American cartoonist, illustrator, and printmaker
- Stacy D. VanDeveer (born 1967), American academic and international relations scholar
- Stacy Dean Campbell (born 1967), American singer-songwriter, author, and TV host
- Stacy F. Sauls (born 1955), American former Episcopal bishop
- Stacy Gore (born 1963), American NFL player
- Stacy Harris (1918–1973), American actor
- Stacy Johnson, several people
- Stacy Jones (disambiguation), several people
- Stacy Keach (born 1941), American actor and narrator
- Stacy Keach, Sr. (1914–2003), American actor and father of Stacy Keach
- Stacy Kohut (born 1970), Canadian Paralympic skier
- Stacy Long (born 1985), English former professional footballer
- Stacy Long (American football) (born 1967), American former NFL player
- Stacy Mader, Australian astronomer
- Stacy Layne Matthews, American drag artist who competed on season 3 of RuPaul's Drag Race
- Stacy McGaugh (born 1964), American astronomer and professor
- Stacy McGee (born 1990), American NFL player
- Stacy Mitchhart (born 1959), American blues guitarist
- Stacy Parrish (born 1968), American songwriter, musician, engineer, and record producer
- Stacy Peralta (born 1957), American film director, entrepreneur, and former professional skateboarder- and team surfer
- Stacy Phillips (1944–2018), American resophonic guitarist and fiddler
- Stacy Robinson (1962–2012), American NFL player
- Stacy Roest (born 1974), Canadian former NHL player
- Stacy Roopnarine, Trinidad and Tobago politician
- Stacy Searels (born 1965), American current college football coach
- Stacy Seegars (born c. 1972), American former football player
- Stacy Smith (disambiguation), several people
- Stacy Spikes (born 1968), American entrepreneur and former film marketing executive and producer
- Stacy Sutherland (1946–1978),Texan guitarist and songwriter with the band The 13th Floor Elevators
- Stacy Tutt (born 1982), American former NFL player
- Stacy Woodard (1902–1942), American producer, cinematographer, and editor of nature films

== Notable female people with the name ==
=== Stacey ===
- Stacey Abrams (born 1973), American politician, lawyer, voting rights activist, author, and director of Fair Fight Action
- Stacey Allaster (born 1963), Canadian-born American sports executive and administrator
- Stacey Alleaume (born c. 1985), Australian operatic soprano
- Stacey-Ann Williams (born 1999), Jamaican athlete
- Stacey Ball (born 1973), Canadian former pair skater
- Stacey Barr (born 1992), Australian AFLW player and WNBL player
- Stacey Bendet (born 1978), American fashion designer
- Stacey Bent, American chemical engineering professor
- Stacey Bentley (1957–2019), American registered nurse and professional bodybuilder
- Stacey Bess (born 1963), American author and educator
- Stacey Blumer (born 1969), American freestyle skier
- Stacey Bowen (born 1969), Canadian retired sprinter
- Stacey Bradford, American financial journalist, author, and commentator
- Stacey Bridges (born 1988), American rugby union player and assistant coach
- Stacey Cadman (born 1979), British actress and television presenter
- Stacey Carr (born 1984), New Zealand field hockey player
- Stacey Carroll, American politician from Virginia
- Stacey Castor (1967–2016), American poisoner convicted of murdering her husband and suspected of having murdered her previous husband
- Stacey Chan (born 1998), Hong Kong rhythmic gymnast and the Miss Hong Kong 2025 Champion
- Stacey Chepkemboi Ndiwa (born 1992), Kenyan long-distance runner
- Stacey Cole (born 1982), English beach volleyball player
- Stacey Cook (born 1984), American alpine ski racer
- Stacey Copeland (born 1981), English professional boxer, teacher, and former footballer
- Stacey Cunningham (born 1974/1975), American banker who served as the 67th president of the NYSE
- Stacey Dales (born 1979), Canadian former WNBA player and current sportscaster
- Stacey Dash (born 1966), American actress
- Stacey Day (born 1988), English association footballer
- Stacey D'Erasmo (born 1961), American author and literary critic
- Stacey Devina Chan (born 1998), Hong Kong rhythmic gymnast
- Stacey Dixon (born 1971), American mechanical engineer and intelligence official
- Stacey Donato, American politician
- Stacey Dooley (born 1987), English television presenter, journalist, and media personality
- Stacey Doubell (born 1987), South African retired badminton player
- Stacey Earle (born 1960), American singer-songwriter
- Stacey Enos (born 1964), American former footballer
- Stacey Evans (born 1978), American politician
- Stacey Farber (born 1987), Canadian actress
- Stacey Ferreira (born 1992), American entrepreneur, speaker, and author
- Stacey Finley, American science professor
- Stacey Flood (born 1996), Irish rugby player
- Stacey Fluhler (born 1995), New Zealand rugby union player
- Stacey Fox (born 1965), American transdisciplinary artist, animator, master percussionist, composer, and filmmaker
- Stacey Francis-Bayman (born 1988), English former netball player
- Stacey Franks (born 1989), British pop singer
- Stacey Fru (born 2007), South African writer and activist
- Stacey Gabriel, American geneticist and biologist
- Stacey Gartrell (born 1977), Australian former freestyle long-distance swimmer
- Stacey Glick (born 1971/1972), American former child actress and current literary agent
- Stacey Gordon, American puppeteer and actress
- Stacey Grenrock-Woods (born 1968), American writer, actress, and former correspondent on The Daily Show
- Stacey Guerin, American politician
- Stacey Halls (born 1989), British novelist of gothic historical fiction
- Stacey Hayes (born 1976), British television infomercial spokesperson, comedian, actress, model, and one-time competitive ice-skater
- Stacey Hillyard (born 1969), British former professional snooker player
- Stacey Hobgood-Wilkes (born 1968), American politician
- Stacey Hollywood (born 1968), American actress, model, and LGBT nightclub personality
- Stacey Hymer (born 1999), Australian taekwondo athlete
- Stacey Kade, American author
- Stacey Keating (born 1986), Australian golfer
- Stacey Kemp (born 1988), British former competitive pair skater
- Stacey Kent (born 1965), American jazz singer
- Stacey Knecht (born 1957), American translator
- Stacey Lannert (born 1972), American convicted murderer
- Stacey Lee, American author of young adult fiction
- Stacey Lee (film director), New Zealand documentary film director
- Stacey Leilua (born 1982), New Zealand actress and producer of Samoan descent
- Stacey Levine, American novelist, short story author, and journalist
- Stacey Liapis (born 1974), American curler
- Stacey Livingstone (born 1988), Australian rules footballer
- Stacey Lovelace-Tolbert (born 1974), American WNBA player
- Stacey M. Floyd-Thomas (born 1969), American author and educator
- Stacey Marinkovich (born 1981), Australian former netball player and current coach
- Stacey Martin (born 1970), American former professional tennis player
- Stacey May Fowles (born 1979), Canadian writer
- Stacey McDougall (born 1990), Scottish international lawn and indoor bowler
- Stacey McGunnigle (born 1985–1987), Canadian actress and comedian
- Stacey McKenzie (born 1977), Jamaican-born Canadian model, runway coach motivational speaker, and television personality
- Stacey McClean (born 1989), British pop singer, part of the S Club 7 spin-off band, S Club 8
- Stacey McManus (born 1989), Australian softball player
- Stacey Mendonca, New Zealand quantity surveyor
- Stacey Michelsen (born 1991), New Zealand field hockey player
- Stacey Milbern (1987–2020), Korean-American disability rights activist
- Stacey Missmer, American reproductive biologist and professor
- Stacey Mitchell (1990–2006), British girl murdered in Australia by lesbian couple Jessica Stasinowsky and Valerie Parashumti
- Stacey Morris, American barber and hairdresser
- Stacey Morrison (born 1973/1974), New Zealand television- and radio host, actress, and MC
- Stacey Naris (born 1991), Namibian international footballer
- Stacey Nelkin (born 1959), American film and television actress
- Stacey Nelson (born 1987), American former softball pitcher
- Stacey Nesbitt (born 1997), Canadian professional motorcycle road racer
- Stacey Nicole English (1975–2012), American formerly missing person
- Stacey Nuveman-Deniz (born 1978), American former professional softball player and current head coach
- Stacey Oristano (born 1979), American actress
- Stacey Patton, American journalist, writer, author, speaker, commentator, and college professor
- Stacey Pensgen (born 1982), American former competitive figure skater and current meteorologist
- Stacey Pheffer Amato (born 1966), American politician
- Stacey Plaskett (born 1966), American politician, attorney, and commentator
- Stacey Poon-Kinney (born 1978/1979), American chef and restaurateur
- Stacey Porter (born 1982), Australian professional indigenous softball player
- Stacey Q (born 1958), American singer, songwriter, dancer, and actress
- Stacey Redmond (born 1988), Irish camogie player
- Stacey Reile (born 1973), American boxer
- Stacey Richter (born 1965), American writer of short fiction
- Stacey Roca (born 1978), British actress
- Stacey Roy, Canadian actress, producer, TV host, and streamer
- Stacey Ryan, Canadian singer and songwriter
- Stacey Schefflin (born 1968), American former professional tennis player
- Stacey Schroeder (born 1979), American film editor
- Stacey Sevilleja (born 2003), Filipino dancer, rapper, and singer, member of Filipino girl group Bini
- Stacey Sher (born 1962), American film producer
- Stacey Shortall, New Zealand lawyer
- Stacey Simmons (born 1972), Bermudian former cricketer
- Stacey Sinclair (born 1971), American psychologist and professor
- Stacey Smith (disambiguation), several people
- Stacey Snider (born 1961), American film industry executive
- Stacey Solomon (born 1989), English singer and television personality who won third place on the sixth series of the UK version of The X Factor
- Stacey Sevilleja (born 2003), Filipino rapper, dancer and singer
- Stacey Tadd (born 1989), British breaststroke swimmer
- Stacey Tappan (born 1973), American coloratura soprano
- Stacey Tendeter (1949–2008), English actress
- Stacey Thomas (born 1978), American former WNBA player
- Stacey Thomson (born 1964), Australian television presenter
- Stacey Tookey (born 1976), Canadian choreographer and dancer
- Stacey Travers, American politician, scientist, and army veteran
- Stacey Travis (born 1964), American actress
- Stacey Tyrell, Canadian photographer
- Stacey Waaka (born 1995), New Zealander rugby league player
- Stacey Waite, American poet
- Stacey Lee Webber (born 1982), American metalsmith
- Stacey Williams (born 1968), American fashion model
- Stacey Williams (swimmer) (born 1981), Australian Paralympic swimming competitor
- Stacey Wooley (born 1968), American biathlete

=== Staci ===
- Staci Appel (born 1966), American politician
- Staci Bilbo, American neuroimmunologist and professor
- Staci Czar, American politician
- Staci Flood (born 1974), American singer, dancer, and model
- Staci Frenes (born 1963), American Christian musician
- Staci Gruber, American psychiatry professor and cannabis researcher
- Staci Keanan (born 1975), American attorney, law professor, and former actress
- Staci M. Yandle (born 1961), American district judge
- Staci Simonich, American environmental scientist, professor, and dean
- Staci Wilson (born 1976), American soccer player and Olympic champion

=== Stacie ===
- Stacie Anaka (born 1987), Canadian freestyle wrestler
- Stacie Cassarino (born 1975), American poet, educator, editor, and author
- Stacie Curtis (born 1986), Canadian curler
- Stacie E. Goddard, American political scientist
- Stacie Huckeba (born 1968), American photographer, film director, writer, and public speaker
- Stacie L. Hixon, American attorney, jurist, and judge
- Stacie Laughton (born c. 1984), American politician
- Stacie Louttit (born 1961), Canadian Paralympic sailor
- Stacie Lynn Renna (born 1973), American film-, television-, and stage actress
- Stacie Mistysyn (born 1971), American-born Canadian former actress
- Stacie Orrico (born 1986), American singer, songwriter, and occasional actress
- Stacie Passon (born 1969), American film director, screenwriter, and producer
- Stacie Powell (born 1985), British diver and astronomer
- Stacie Randall (born 1962), American actress
- Stacie Terry-Hutson (born 1976), American basketball coach and former player

=== Stacy ===
- Stacy A. Littlejohn, American screenwriter, producer, and showrunner
- Stacy Allison (born 1958), American summiter of Mount Everest
- Stacy Amoateng, Ghanaian television presenter/producer, media consultant, philanthropist, and actress
- Stacy Anam (born 1990), Malaysian singer, composer, and songwriter who won the sixth season of Akademi Fantasia
- Stacy-Ann Gooden, Jamaican-born American model and weather reporter
- Stacy Apfelbaum, American retired rowing cox
- Stacy Arthur (1968–2019), American model and actress
- Stacy Babb (born 1983), Bermudian cricketer
- Stacy Barnett, victim in the murders of John Goosey and Stacy Barnett
- Stacy Barthe (born 1985), American songwriter, composer, and singer
- Stacy Bennett, American politician
- Stacy Bishop (born 1985), American former NWSL player
- Stacy Blake-Beard, American psychologist
- Stacy Boyle (born 1974), American former rugby union player
- Stacy Bregman (born 1986), South African professional golfer
- Stacy Brenner, American politician, registered nurse, small business owner, and organic farmer
- Stacy Bromberg (1956–2017), American darts player
- Stacy Brooks (born 1952), American activist; one of the most public and outspoken critics of the Church of Scientology
- Stacy Brown-Philpot, American computer businesswoman
- Stacy C. Hollander, American art scholar and former American museum curator
- Stacy Carter (born 1970), American retired professional wrestler and valet
- Stacy Clark (born 1980), American singer and songwriter
- Stacy Clinesmith (born 1978), American former WNBA player and current college assistant coach
- Stacy Cochran, American film director, screenwriter, and producer
- Stacy Dean, American policy advisor
- Stacy-Deanne (born 1978), American author
- Stacy Dittrich (born 1973), American author, mystery novelist, and former police detective
- Stacy Doris (1962–2012), American poet
- Stacy Dorning (born 1958), British actress
- Stacy Dragila (born 1971), American pole vaulter
- Stacy DuPree (born 1988), band member of Eisley
- Stacy Earl (born 1963), American dancer, pop singer, and actress
- Stacy Edwards (born 1965), American actress
- Stacy Erwin Oakes (born 1973), American politician
- Stacy Ferguson (born 1975), American pop singer (part of Wild Orchid and The Black Eyed Peas)
- Stacy Francis (born 1969), American singer and actress
- Stacy Fuson (born 1978), American model
- Stacy Galina (born 1966), American jeweler and former actress
- Stacy Garrity (born 1964), American politician, businesswoman, and soldier
- Stacy Gaskill (born 2000), American snowboarder
- Stacy H. Schusterman (born c. 1963), American billionaire businesswoman and philanthropist
- Stacy Haiduk (born 1968), American actress
- Stacy Hansmeyer (born 1978), American former NCAA basketball player and former coach
- Stacy Hardy, South African writer, journalist, multimedia artist, and theater practitioner
- Stacy Head (born 1969), American lawyer and former politician
- Stacy Horn (born 1956), American author, businesswoman, and occasional journalist
- Stacy Igel, American fashion designer, author, founder, and creative director
- Stacy Jefferson (born 1946), British actress
- Stacy Jo Scott (born 1981), American artist, art educator, curator, and writer
- Stacy Jupiter (born 1975), Fijian marine scientist
- Stacy Kamano (born 1974), American television actress
- Stacy Keibler (born 1979), American model, actress, retired professional wrestler, and former WWE Diva
- Stacy King, American former film and television actress
- Stacy Lackay (born 1994), South African cricketer
- Stacy Lande, American contemporary lowbrow painter
- Stacy Lattisaw (born 1966), American R&B singer
- Stacy Leeds (born 1971), American law professor, scholar, and former politician
- Stacy Lentz (born 1970), American LGBT rights activist
- Stacy Levy (born 1960), American sculptor
- Stacy Lewis (born 1985), American professional golfer
- Stacy London (born 1969), American fashion consultant and media personality
- Stacy Longstreet, American art director and role-playing game artist
- Stacy Lyn Harris, American cookbook author, blogger, television host, gardener, and public speaker
- Stacy Lynn Waddell (born 1966), American artist
- Stacy Makishi, Hawaiian-born performance artist, and physical theater and live art specialist
- Stacy Margolin (born 1959), American tennis player
- Stacy-Marie Ishmael, Trinidad and Tobago journalist and editor
- Stacy Martin (born 1990), French actress
- Stacy Morze, American theater actress and musician
- Stacy Offner, American rabbi
- Stacy Osei-Kuffour (born 1987), American playwright, actress, and writer
- Stacy Otieno (born 1990), Kenyan rugby sevens player
- Stacy Pearsall (born 1980), American photographer
- Stacy Philpott, American ecologist and professor
- Stacy Piagno (born 1991), American baseball player
- Stacy Prammanasudh (born 1979), American retired professional golfer
- Stacy Ritter (born 1960), American politician
- Stacy Roiall (born 1977), New Zealand-born Australian sport shooter
- Stacy Rowles (1955–2009), American jazz trumpeter, flugelhornist, and vocalist
- Stacy Rukeyser (born 1970), American television writer and producer
- Stacy Schiff (born 1961), American author
- Stacy Sims (born 1973), exercise physiologist, author, and women's health and fitness advocate
- Stacy Sykora (born 1977), American retired volleyball player
- Stacy Szymaszek (born 1969), American poet, professor, and arts administrator
- Stacy Tessler Lindau, American gynecologist and practicing OB-GYN
- Stacy Title (1964–2021), American film director and producer
- Stacy Valentine (born 1970), American former pornographic actress
- Stacy Westfall (born 1974), American professional horse trainer
- Stacy Wilson (born 1965), Canadian former women's hockey team captain, former assistant coach, author, and former women's ice hockey team head coach
- Stacy Zinn, American politician
- Stacy (zouk singer), Martiniquai and Guyanese zouk singer

== Notable people with the surname ==
=== Stacey ===
- Alan Stacey (1933–1960), British racing driver
- Charles Perry Stacey (1906–1989), Canadian historian and university professor
- Jeremy Stacey (born 1963), British drummer and keyboard player
- Joshua Stacey (born 2000), Welsh para table tennis player
- Margaret Stacey (1922–2004), British sociologist
- Mark Stacey (born 1964), Welsh valuer, auctioneer and TV presenter
- Mary Stacey (born 1961), British judge
- Nadia Stacey, British make-up artist
- Nicolas Stacey (1927–2017), British sprinter, priest, and social activist
- Paul Stacey (born 1963), British guitarist and music producer
- Ruby Stacey (born 2005), British artistic gymnast
- Terry Stacey (born 1962), British cinematographer
- Valerie Stacey, Lady Stacey, Scottish lawyer and Senator of the College of Justice

== Fictional characters ==
- Anastasia Elizabeth "Stacey or Stace" McGill, in The Baby-Sitters Club book series
- Captain George Stacy, in the Spider-Man comic books and films, father of Peter Parker's first love, Gwen
- Gwen Stacy, in the Spider-Man comics, and the Amazing Spider-Man films
- Malibu Stacy, a doll appearing in The Simpsons episode, "Lisa vs. Malibu Stacy"
- Stacee Jaxx, in the 2012 film Rock of Ages, played by Tom Cruise
- Stacey Bridges, in the 1973 film High Plains Drifter, played by Geoffrey Lewis (actor)
- Stacey Cameron MacAindra, in Margaret Laurence's 1969 novel The Fire-Dwellers
- Stacey Dillsen, in the American Nickelodeon comedy-drama show Zoey 101
- Stacey Ehrmantraut, in the TV franchise Breaking Bad, played by Kerry Condon
- Stacey Colbert Dorsey, in the American sitcom Ned and Stacey, played by Debra Messing
- Stacey Forsythe, in the 2010 video game Dead Rising 2
- Stacey Hanson, in the 1973 film Stacey, played by Anne Randall
- Stacey Logan, in the book 1976 novel Roll of Thunder, Hear My Cry by Mildred D. Taylor
- Stacey Macklin, in the Australian soap opera Home and Away
- Stacey Petrie, in the TV series The Dick Van Dyke Show, played by Jerry Van Dyke
- Stacey Pilgrim, in the Scott Pilgrim graphic novels and franchise
- Stacey Potazenik, in the 1984 management-oriented novel The Goal by Eliyahu M. Goldratt
- Stacey Shipman (née West), in the UK sitcom Gavin & Stacey, played by Joanna Page
- Stacey Slater, in the UK soap opera EastEnders, played by Lacey Turner
- Stacey Sutton, in the 1985 Bond film A View to a Kill, played by Tanya Roberts
- Stacey, in the 1992 film Candyman, played by Carolyn Lowery
- Stacey, Roxanne's best friend in the 1995 film A Goofy Movie, voiced by Jenna von Oy
- Stacey, Derek Vinyard's neo-Nazi ex-girlfriend from the D.O.C (Disciples of Christ) in the 1998 movie American History X
- Stacey, in the 2003 film Love Actually, played by Ivana Milicevic
- Stacey, in the 2014 film Gore, Quebec, played by Peri Greig
- Stacey, in the 2015 film The Visit, played by Celia Keenan-Bolger
- Staci, in the reality show parody Total Drama: Revenge of the Island, voiced by Ashley Peters
- Stacie Conrad, in the 2012 film Pitch Perfect, played by Alexis Knapp
- Stacie Monroe, in the TV series Hustle, played by Jaime Murray
- Stacie Roberts, a doll who is a sister to Barbie
- Stacey Conwell, in DC Comics series The Flash
- Stacy Hamilton, in the 1982 film Fast Times at Ridgemont High, played by Jennifer Jason Leigh
- Stacy Hanseni, in the Girl Talk series of books
- Stacy Hirano, in the Disney Channel animated series Phineas and Ferb, voiced by Kelly Hu
- Stacy Jones, in the PBS TV series Shining Time Station, played by Didi Conn
- Stacy Lovell, the creator of the Malibu Stacy doll in The Simpsons episode, "Lisa vs. Malibu Stacy"
- Stacy Rowe, in the MTV animated series Daria, voiced by Jessica Zaino and Sarah Drew
- Stacy Stickler, in the Canadian animated TV series Stickin' Around, voiced by Ashley Taylor (Tickell)
- Stacy Townsend, in the Radio Times comic strips
- Stacy Twelfmann, in the 1999 film Cherry Falls, played by Bre Blair
- Stacy Warner, in the US TV series House, played by Sela Ward
- Stacy X, in the Marvel Comics universe
- Stacy, in the 2008 film The Ruins, and the novel it was based on, played by Laura Ramsey
- Stacy, in the 2012 film The Sleeper, played by Riana Ballo
- Stacy, in the 2013 film Axeman, played by Elissa Dowling
- Stacy/Stacaesar, in the Japanese TV drama Kikai Sentai Zenkaiger, voiced by Ryo Sekoguchi

== In popular culture ==
In the incelosphere, the name Stacy is used to refer to the female counterpart of Chad.
