= Stack (surname) =

Stack is a surname of Irish origin and is commonly found in county Kerry, Ireland. Variants of the name Stack include Stace, Stacey, Stacy, Stacke and De Staic. It is a baptismal name meaning "Son of Eustace", a Roman name of great antiquity.

Notable persons with this name include:

- Aindrias Stack (born 1978), Irish actor and musician
- Annie Stack (1894–??), Australian woman
- Anthony Stack (born 1961), Canadian general
- Austin Stack (1879–1929), Irish republican and politician
- Balaram Stack (born 1991), American surfer
- Brennan Stack (born 1988), Australian rules footballer
- Brian P. Stack (born 1966), American politician
- Brian Stack (born 1964), American actor, comedian and writer
- Brian Stack (1935/1936–1984), Irish murder victim
- Carol Stack (born 1940), American anthropologist
- Charles Stack (disambiguation), multiple people
- Chelle Stack (born 1973), American gymnast
- Chris Stack, American actor
- Claudia Stack (born 1966), American educator, writer, documentarian and film producer
- David Stack (1957–1976), American murder victim
- Eddie Stack (1887–1958), American baseball player
- Edmund J. Stack (1874–1957), U.S. Representative from Illinois
- Edward Stack (disambiguation), multiple people
- Ella Stack (1929–2023), Australian doctor and politician
- Frank Stack (1937–2026), American cartoonist
- Gael Stack (born 1941), American artist
- George Stack (born 1946), Irish Roman Catholic archbishop
- Graham Stack (disambiguation), multiple people
- Harvey G. Stack (1928–2022), American numismatist
- Jack Stack, American businessman
- James S. Stack (1852–1920), American politician
- James West Stack (1835–1919), New Zealand clergyman and author
- Jim Stack, American basketball executive
- John Stack (disambiguation)
- Jonathan Stack (born 1957), American documentary filmmaker
- Joseph Stack, American who flew an aircraft into an Austin, Texas building to attack the IRS
- Kelli Stack (born 1988), American ice hockey player
- Lee Stack (1868–1924), British army officer and administrator
- Mary Bagot Stack (1883–1935), Irish fitness pioneer
- Michael J. Stack (1888–1960), American politician
- Mike Stack (born 1963), American politician
- Neville Stack (1919–1994), senior Royal Air Force commander
- Oisín Stack, Irish actor
- Peggy Fletcher Stack, American journalist and writer
- Philip Stack (1900–1948), American poet
- Phil Stack, Australian musician
- Prunella Stack (1914–2010), British fitness pioneer and women's rights activist
- Richard Stack (died 1812), Irish author
- Robert Stack (1919–2003), American actor and television host
- Ryan Stack (born 1975), American basketball player
- Seán Stack (born 1953), Irish hurler
- Stephen Stack, Irish Gaelic footballer
- Steven Stack, American sociologist
- Timothy Stack (born 1956), American actor and screenwriter
- Tommy Stack (born 1945), Irish jockey
- William Stack (1882–1949), American actor
