= Jack Boynton =

American painter (1928–2010)

- Jack Boynton in his Studio 1950s or 60s
- Born: James Wesley Boynton; 12 January 1928; Fort Worth, Texas
- Died: 5 April 2010 (aged 82); Houston, Texas
- Education: Texas Christian University (TCU)
- Known for: Painter, Printmaker, Sculpture
- Movement: Abstract Expressionist

James W. Jack Boynton (January 12, 1928 – April 5, 2010) was an American artist.

== Biography ==
Jack Boynton was born in Fort Worth, Texas in 1928. He graduated from Lamar High School in 1945, received Bachelor of Fine Arts (1949) and Master of Fine Arts (1955). He worked as an instructor at University of Houston from 1955–57, San Francisco Art Institute from 1960–62, and as a professor at University of St. Thomas (Texas) from 1969-1985.

He began exhibiting paintings in 1950; has been included in numerous group exhibitions, nationally and internationally, since that time at museums, galleries and universities. Boynton was a key figure in the post-World War II Houston arts scene. According to a Houston Chronicle article written by Douglas Britt, Boynton garnered national attention in the 1950s and 1960s for his modernist, largely abstract paintings.

In 2006 Jack Boynton said:

Artists in Houston in the 50s, 60s and 70s would have been Jim Love, Dick Wray, Herb Mears, Dorothy Hood, Charles Pebworth. Lowell Collins still had status in the 50s, and Henri Gadbois. Mildred Dixon Sherwood had some prominence. Of course, people like Stella Sullivan, you know. Stella was sort of conservative, even then. The 50s was sort of the interim that Jerry MacAgy had big influence, and she had people that were either very enthusiastic about her, or were very negative about her. She didn’t seem to hit the halfway mark. Nobody was indifferent. Then in the 60s I moved to San Francisco, and back in ’62—and somewhere in that interim Sweeney came to town, and Sweeney sort of had sway for a while.

In 2009 Susie Kalil Said:

The term "breakthrough" is often used to denote a major accomplishment of an artist, the works in which he achieves indisputable progress. But what determines a "breakthrough"? What happens when an artist begins a new style? Does he shut off one room before entering another? Or does he extend the space that already exists? Spanning some six decades, Jack Boynton's paintings and works on paper (Lithographs) allow us to measure the way that one person's experiences and sensibility have been expressed in visual impulses. Significantly, Boynton turns arbitrariness into a fine art and does so without sticking to any one approach or medium. Rather, each encounter with a cultural symbol, everyday object or personal memory is reflected in the physical sensuality and structural clarity of his art. Oscillating between past and present, formal elegance and pressurized energy, the exhibition reveals Boynton to be an artist constantly changing and enlarging the sphere in which he functions. Through paintings, Boynton reflects the natural world in order to heighten awareness of our place in the universal.

Jack Boynton Flayed Image, 1959

=== Jack Boynton and Richard Stout ===
They arrived in Houston within about eighteen months of each other, Jack Boynton coming first from Fort Worth, freshly out of formal training at TCU. He brought with him the Modernist influences of the Fort Worth circle, and particularly the non-objective "post-circle" tendencies garnered through his association with the likes of Charles Williams, McKie Trotter and others. Richard Stout, a Beaumont native, arrived next. Coming to the city from the venerable Chicago Art Institute, he selected Houston as a home from which to launch a career and to perfect his energetic and dynamic paintings motif. Both young artists quickly set roots in Houston. They found encouragement here and developed a personal collegiality that led them to share a studio together for a time during the late 1950s through the early 1960s.

== Exhibitions ==
- 1954 Drawings and Paintings by John Biggers and Jack Boynton, (Museum of Fine Arts), Houston, TX; Architectural League, New York, NY
- 1954 "Younger American Painters." Solomon R. Guggenheim Museum, New York
- 1957 "Young America," Whitney Museum of American Art, New York
- 1957,1958 1 of 17 artist representing USA at the Brussels World's Fair
- 1955 Ft. Worth Art Center (now Museum of Modern Art) (Solo)
- 1958, 1959 Barone Gallery, New York City (Solo)
- 1959 Dallas Museum of Contemporary Art, (Dallas Museum of Art)
- 1961 "64th American Exhibition Paintings & Sculpture" The Art Institute of Chicago, Chicago
- 1961 Staempfli Gallery, NYC (Solo)
- 1962 "Recent Painting: The Figure," Museum of Modern Art, New York
- 1964 Louisiana Gallery, Houston (Solo)
- 1966 David Gallery, Houston (Solo)
- 1968, 1969 Atelier Chapman Kelley, Dallas (Solo
- 1970 Delgado Museum (now New Orleans Museum of Art. of NO); Simmone Stern Gallery, New Orleans La (Solo)
- 1971 University of St. Thomas (Texas), Houston (Solo)
- 1972 "Landscape Exhibition in Museum Penthouse," Milet Andrejevic, James Jack Boynton, John Button, Christo, Jan Dibbets, Lois Dodd, David Hockney, Yvonne Jacquette, Alex Katz, Gabriel Laderman, Richard Mayhew, Malcolm Morley, Robert Morris, Catherine Murphy, Dennis Oppenheim, Fairfield Porter, Sam Richardson, Edward Ruscha, Robert Smithson, Alan Sonfist, Larry Stark, Pat Steir, Neil Welliver and Ann Wilson. (among other artists) The Museum of Modern Art, New York
- 1972 Fort Worth Art Center (Now Modern Art Museum of Fort Worth) (Solo)
- 1974 Du Bose Gallery, Houston (Solo)
- 1976 Rice University-Sewall Gallery, Houston, Texas
- 1976, 1977, 1979, 1982, 1983, 1986 Betty Moody Gallery, Houston (Solo)
- 1979 University of Houston at Clear Lake City – Houston, Texas (Solo)
- 1980 “Retrospectrum” Amarillo Art Center, Amarillo Texas and circulating to Texas Museums: Tyler Museum of Art, Art Center of Waco, Abilene Fine Arts Museum (The Grace Museum), and Beaumont Art Museum (Art Museum of Southeast Texas). (retrospective)
- 1980, 1959 Dord Fitz Gallery, Amarillo (Solo)
- 1982, 1985, 1986, 1989 William Campbell Contemporary Art, Fort Worth, Texas
- 1985 "Fresh Paint: The Houston School," Museum of Fine Arts, Houston, Houston
- 1988 February 10–Mary 15, Texas Art: An exhibition selected from The Menil Collection, The Museum of Fine Arts, Houston and Trustees' Collections of the Contemporary Arts Museum. Artists: John Alexander, David Bates, Forrest Bess, Derek Boshier, Jack Boynton, Mel Chin, Ben L. Culwell, Jeff Delude, Chuck Dugan, Vernon Fisher, Joseph Glasco, Roy Fridge, Bert Long, Jim Love, Ken Luce, David McManaway, Melissa Miller, Gael Stack, Earl Staley, Richard Stout, James Surls, Michael Tracy, Bob Wade, Dick Wray, Richmond Hall, The Menil Collection
- 1989 “Homecoming:a Thumbnail Retrospective”, Texas Christian University, Fort Worth, Texas (Solo)
- 1990, 1991 Lynn Goode Gallery, Houston (Solo)
- 1994 Palomar Cafe, Houston (Solo)
- 1998 David Dike Gallery, Dallas (Solo)
- 2002 Gerhard Wurzer Gallery, Houston (Solo)
- 2005 Tomball College, Texas (Lone Star College–Tomball) (Solo)
- 2006 Redbud Gallery, Houston (Solo)
- 2007 "Texas Modern," Martin Museum of Art, Baylor University
- 2007 "Jack Boynton & Richard Stout. Early works in Houston," William Reaves Fine Art Gallery. Houston
- 2009 "Six Decades of Jack Boynton," William Reaves Fine Art Gallery. Houston (Solo)
- 2010 "Dear Houston: Paintings on Envelopes by Jack Boynton and Letters to Artists" by Ron Hartgrove, Hartgrove Galleries, Houston, TX (Solo)

=== Selected major collections ===
- Solomon R. Guggenheim Museum, New York City
- Blanton Museum of Art, University of Texas, Austin
- Museum of Fine Arts, Houston, Houston
- Dallas Museum of Art
- Wadsworth Atheneum of Hartford, Connecticut
- Museum of Modern Art, New York City
- Modern Art Museum of Fort Worth
- Mountain View College, Dallas
- Amon Carter Museum, Fort Worth
- New Orleans Museum of Art
- Tamarind Institute of Lithography Workshop, Albuquerque, NM
- Whitney Museum of American Art, New York City
- Butler Institute of American Art
- Fred Jones Jr. Museum of Art
- New Orleans Museum of Art, New Orleans
- The Grace Museum
- University of Michigan Museum of Art
- Oklahoma Art Center, Oklahoma City

(in others as well as many private collections)

=== List of works ===
- Aftermath '57, oil and sand on canvas, collection Whitney Museum of American Art
- Flayed Image, 1959. Oil on canvas 70"x80" framed (70-3/4" x 80-1/2". Private collection
- Argonne Forest '69, acrylic on canvas, collection of Oklahoma Art Center, Oklahoma City
- Hunchback Rainbow '67, oil on canvas, collection of Mountain View College, Dallas
- Injun Country '68, acrylic on canvas, Moody Galleries, Houston
- Midnight Cowboy '69, acrylic on canvas, collection of ISD Corp., Houston
- Night Watch '67, oil on canvas, collection of Amarillo Museum of Art, Amarillo
- Top Of The Beanstalk '68, acrylic on canvas, collection of New Orleans Museum of Art, New Orleans
- Mountains '72, oil on canvas, Betty Moody Gallery, Houston
- Sequi-Tex Campfire '86, acrylic on canvas. Private collection
- Riverbank Encounters 4, '94, acrylic on canvas. Private collection
- Insert '05. Private collection
- The Red Area, 1959, Oil. Private collection
- Teeth, 1967 color lithograph. The Annex Galleries inventory includes works Jack Boynton

(and many others.)
