= Katu =

Katu most often refers to:

- Katu people, an ethnic group from Laos and Vietnam
- Katu language, spoken by the Katu

Katu may also refer to:

- Katu (Marvel Comics), a Marvel Comics character
- KATU, an American television station in Oregon
- Stacey Katu, Cook Island rugby player
