= SUPRE (suicide) =

WHO suicide prevention program

SUPRE is a World Health Organization suicide prevention program. SUPRE gathers statistics and has launched a five-continent study of suicide. SUPRE also publishes advice for media organizations to follow in order to prevent copycat suicides.
