= Nicole Shelton =

American psychologist and academic

- Other name: J. Nicole Shelton
- Education: College of William & Mary (B.A.); University of Virginia (M.A., PhD)
- Scientific career
- Fields: Psychology, social psychology, prejudice, intergroup relations
- Workplaces: Princeton University

J. Nicole Shelton is an American psychologist and Stuart Professor of Psychology at Princeton University. Her research focuses on racial prejudice and interactions between whites and ethnic minorities.

== Early life and education ==
Shelton grew up in Virginia and received a Bachelor of Arts degree in psychology from the College of William & Mary in 1993. She received a Master of Arts in 1996 and a Ph.D. in psychology in 1998, both from the University of Virginia.

== Career ==
Shelton joined the Department of Psychology at Princeton University in 2000 and is currently a Stuart Professor of Psychology. She leads the Stigma and Social Perception Lab there with professor Stacey Sinclair.

From 2012 to 2020, Shelton also served as the head of Butler College and serves as an Athletics Fellow to the Princeton women's basketball team.

== Selected articles ==
- Shelton, J.N. (2000). A reconceptualization of how we study issues of racial prejudice. Personality and Social Psychology Review, 4, 374–390.
- Shelton, J.N. (2003). Interpersonal concerns in social encounters between majority and minority group members. Group Processes and Intergroup Relations, 6, 171–186.
- Richeson, J.A. & Shelton, J. N. (2003). When prejudice does not pay: Effects of interracial contact on executive function. Psychological Science, 14, 287–290.
- Sellers, R.M. & Shelton, J.N. (2003). The role of racial identity in perceived racial discrimination. Journal of Personality and Social Psychology, 84, 1079–1092.
- Shelton, J. N. (2003). Interpersonal concerns in social encounters between majority and minority group members. Group Processes & Intergroup Relations, 6(2), 171–185.
- "Richeson, J. A., & Shelton, J. N. (2003). When prejudice does not pay: Effects of interracial contact on executive function. Psychological Science, 14(3), 287–290.
- Sellers, R. M., & Shelton, J. N. (2003). The role of racial identity in perceived racial discrimination. Journal of personality and social psychology, 84(5), 1079..
