= Stella Strada =

Filipino actress (1967–1984)

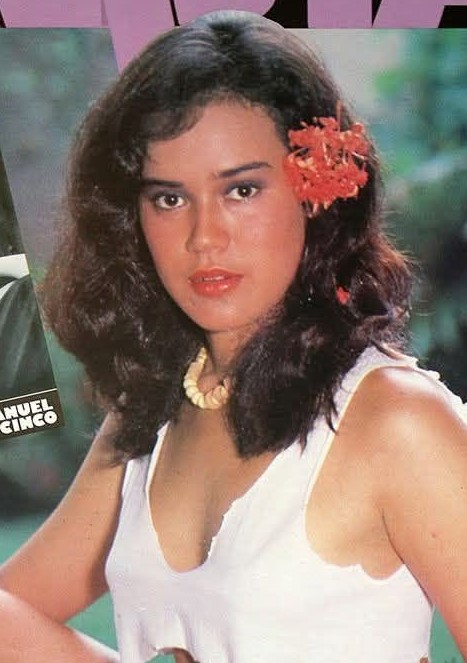
- From the original theatrical poster of "Malisya" (1984)
- Born: Suzette Orate Bishop; April 14, 1967
- Died: December 28, 1984 (aged 17); San Juan, Metro Manila, Philippines
- Cause of death: Suicide by hanging
- Occupation: Actress
- Years active: 1983–1984

Suzette Orate Bishop (April 14, 1967 (Note: Although some media archives and early industry sources cite Strada's birth year as 1965 or 1966, her official gravestone at Loyola Memorial Park records her birth year as 1967.) – December 28, 1984), better known by her stage name Stella Strada, was a Filipino actress in the Philippines.

== Career ==
Strada entered the Philippine film industry in 1983, signing as a contract star with Seiko Films under producer Robbie Tan, who regarded her as a prized discovery. She made her debut that year in Kirot, a Seiko Films production that launched her career with its sensational success. Strada gained popularity for her bold performances typical of the era's exploitation and "bold star" trend, cementing her status as a sex symbol in an era where such roles were central to many commercial releases from companies like Seiko Films.

In 1985, Strada received a posthumous nomination for the FAMAS Award for Best Actress for her performance in her final film, Puri (1984).

== Personal life ==
Strada’s life behind the scenes was heavily plagued by personal hardships, including a troubled childhood and early exploitation by figures in the movie industry.

Strada sought to transition into mainstream cinema to pursue serious acting roles and distance herself from bomba films, which prompted her conversion to Born-Again Christianity. However, her career declined significantly following this shift. The subsequent loss of film offers precipitated severe financial distress, depression, and alleged substance abuse.

== Death ==
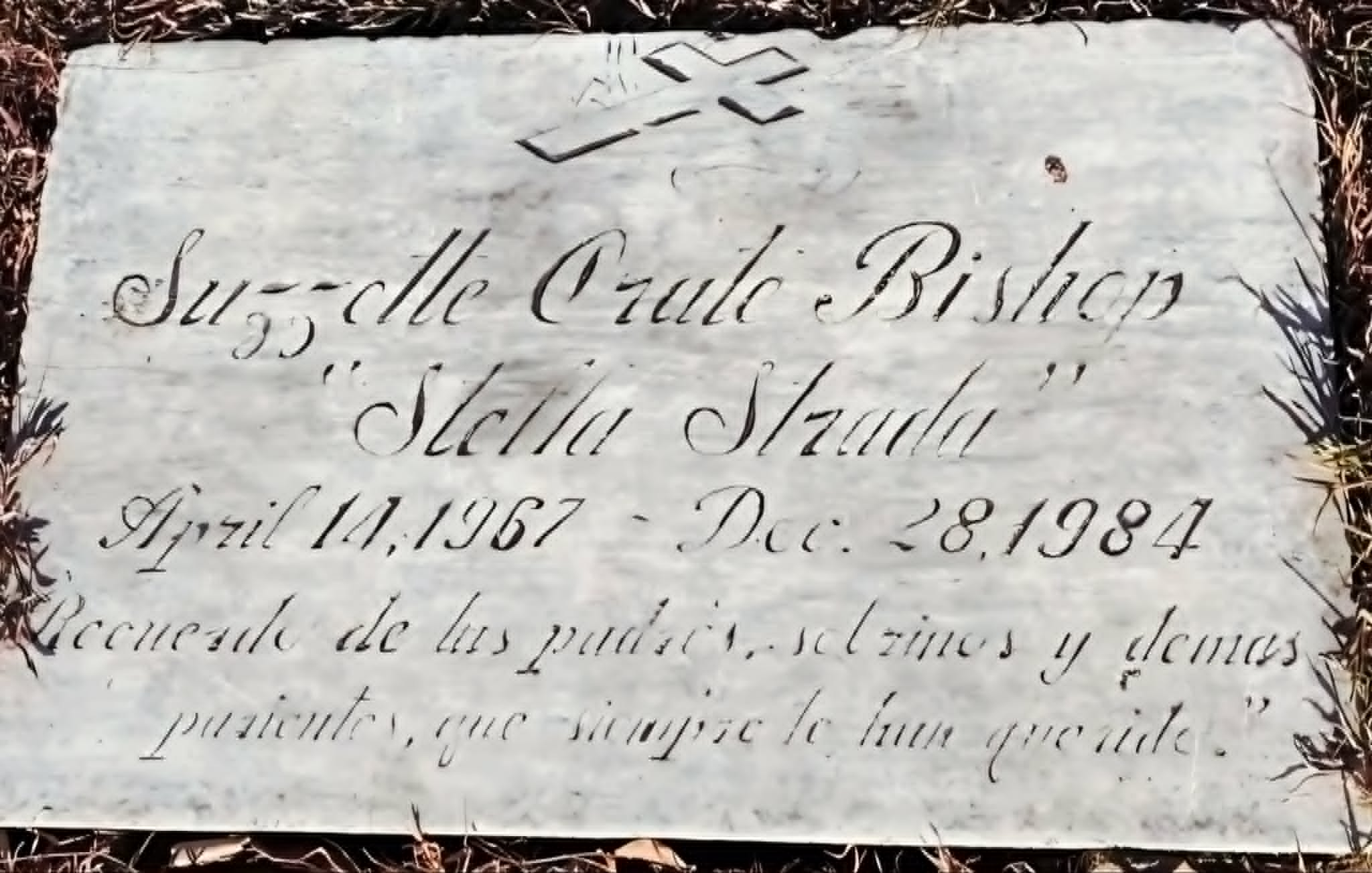
Stella Strada's tombstone at Loyola Memorial Park in Parañaque City.

On December 28, 1984, at the height of her career, Strada died by suicide alongside her confidant, Rene Mas, in her rented apartment on Jose Abad Santos Street in San Juan, Metro Manila. She was 17 years old. Their bodies were discovered hanging from nylon cords by her housemaid, Emma Ordinario, who entered the room using a duplicate key after receiving no response. According to police reports, investigators recovered an unsigned suicide note addressed to Strada’s mother, which detailed feelings of isolation. Ordinario later verified that the handwritten note was authentic to the actress. Wrist cuts and substance abuse from a previous occasion were also noted during the investigation. There are reports stating that Strada left a tape recording of her inner thoughts, frustrations, and her goodbyes to relatives. The tape has since been kept by her relatives, but the police refuse to confirm or deny it.

In her unsigned suicide note, she wrote: "Mommy, walang nagmamahal sa akin at walang nakakaintindi dito. Mahal ko kayong lahat. Isang bagay lang ang hinihiling ko. Pakisunog ninyo lahat ng gamit ko at walang ititira." ('Mommy, no one loves me and no one understands me here. I love you all. I only ask for one thing. Please burn all my things and leave nothing behind.')

Her remains were buried at Loyola Memorial Park in Parañaque City.

== Legacy ==
Following her death, the local media reported a cluster of copycat suicides by hanging, termed the "Stella Strada Syndrome" in 1985. Reports at that time cited the suicide of Pepsi Paloma and the multiple suicide attempts of Sarsi Emmanuelle as prominent examples of this phenomenon.

A successor using the moniker Stella Strada Jr. (or Stella Strada II) appeared in feature films such as Mababangis na bulaklak (1986) and Ginto sa putikan (1987) after the death of the original actress.

== Filmography ==
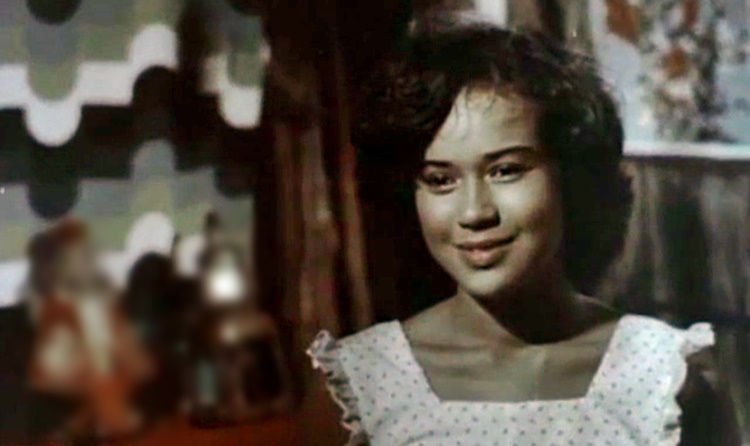
Stella Strada as Rosa in Kirot (1983)

=== Movies ===
Year	Title	Role
1983	Inside Job	
1983	Kirot	Rosa
1983	Angkinin Mo Ako	
1983	Hanguin Mo Ako Sa Putik	Cely
1984	Sex Education	
1984	Malisya	
1984	Kriminal	
1984	Puri	Puri / Ligaya / Clara

== Accolades ==
Year	Organization	Category	Work	Result
1985	FAMAS Awards	Best Actress	Puri	Nominated
