= Stasia =

Stasia may be:

- An informal name for the Caribbean island of Sint Eustatius
- A diminutive for a Polish feminine first name Stanisława
- A diminutive for a Polish feminine first name Anastazja or for Russian/Belarusian/Ukrainian Anastasia.
- "Ciocia Stasia" (Stanisława Dorobczyk-Bałucka) from Polish TV series Klan
