= Charles Stack =

Charles Stack may refer to:

- Charles Stack (lawyer) (1935–2022), Florida lawyer and former federal judicial nominee to the U.S. Court of Appeals
- Charles Stack (bishop) (1825–1914), Anglican bishop
- Charles Stack (rugby union)
