= Stacy Burk =

American singer-songwriter

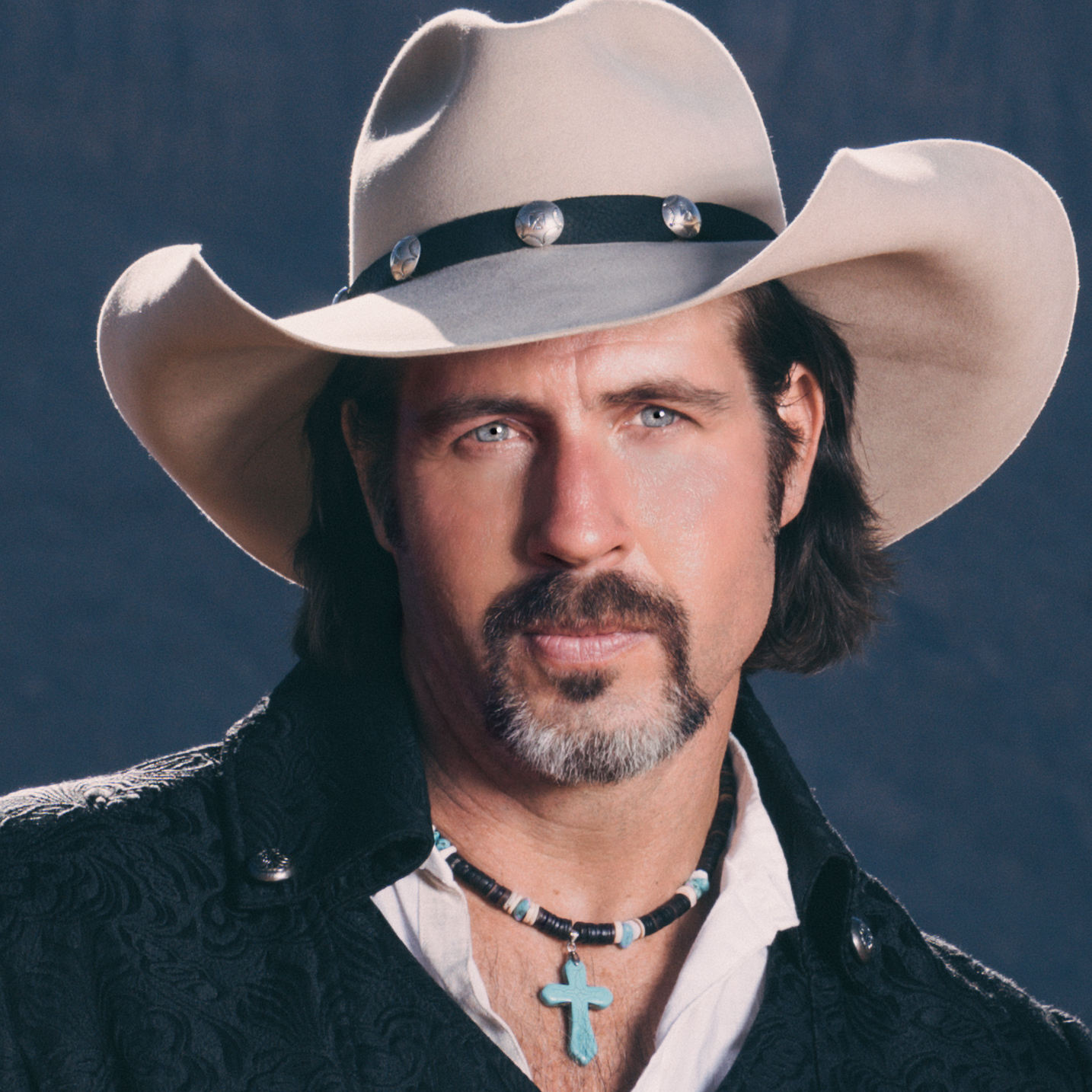

Background information
- Born: Van Alstyne, Texas
- Genre: Country
- Occupations: singer-songwriter, producer, photographer, creative artist
- Labels: Warner Bros. Records, Rio Records
- Website: https://www.stacyburkphotography.com

Stacy Burk is an American country singer-songwriter, photographer, producer and creative artist from Van Alstyne, Texas.

== Early life ==
Stacy Burk was born in Van Alstyne, TX, to Doyle and Dixie Burk. Stacy began singing and performing music at age 12 with the encouragement of his mother. Soon after, Dixie entered him into his first talent show. Stacy's mother continued to enter him in various shows, several in which he performed with Leann Rimes.

While in high school, Burk played in a band called "Something Special" and performed at the National Future Farmers of America Convention in front of 24,000 people for two years in a row. Burk won several talent shows across Texas, with one placing him on the Today Show with Willard Scott.

Burk attended Sul Ross State University and received a bachelor's degree in Equestrian Science. After college, Burk moved to Branson, MO where he played at Silver Dollar City and Mutton Hollow. He later moved to Nashville to pursue a record deal with Warner Bros. Records. Shortly after, Burk's mother was diagnosed with cancer. To support his mother while she was terminally ill, Burk moved back to Texas. After his mother died, Burk moved to Colorado where he started a courier business called "Cowboy Carriers". As he built his business, he also sang on a Chuck Wagon Show.

After running his courier business, Burk took on the position of Equestrian Director at the Southwest chapter of the Boys & Girls Ranch. While encouraging the boys and girls at the ranch to pursue their dreams, he realized he wasn't pursuing his own. Not wanting to live with regrets, Burk relocated to Nashville to pursue the dream he gave up years ago.

To help support his music career and music video production, Stacy Burk has developed a successful adventure elopement photography business in the town of Sedona, Arizona. He has been photographing weddings, families and couples in Sedona for over a decade and has become the most Google reviewed photographer in the Southwest USA. You can see his current work and music videos on his website at Sedona Wedding & Elopement Photographer | Sedona, AZ | Stacy Burk Photography

== Music career ==
On March 25, 2014, Burk released his first single, "Til Your Boots Are Dirty". On September 16, 2014, Burk released his debut album Keep Your Dreams Alive. The album was produced by Josh Leo (Martina McBride, Alabama, LeAnn Rimes). Stacy Burk collaborated with Los Angeles-based director Dave West to make the music video for "Til Your Boots Are Dirty". The video features Dancing with the Stars veteran Maksim Chmerkovskiy. It was shot at the JMJ Ranch in Thousand Oaks, CA in November 2013 and released on January 28, 2014. "Til Your Boots Are Dirty" has over 200,000 views.

== Awards ==
In 1992 Burk was awarded "Male Newcomer of the Year" and "Duo of the Year" for his work with Lori Locke, by the "Live Music Show Capitol of the World," Branson, MO.

== Discography ==
Keep Your Dreams Alive (2014)

Overdrive (2016)

Ride On Cowboy (2025)
