= Copycat suicide =

Emulation of another suicide

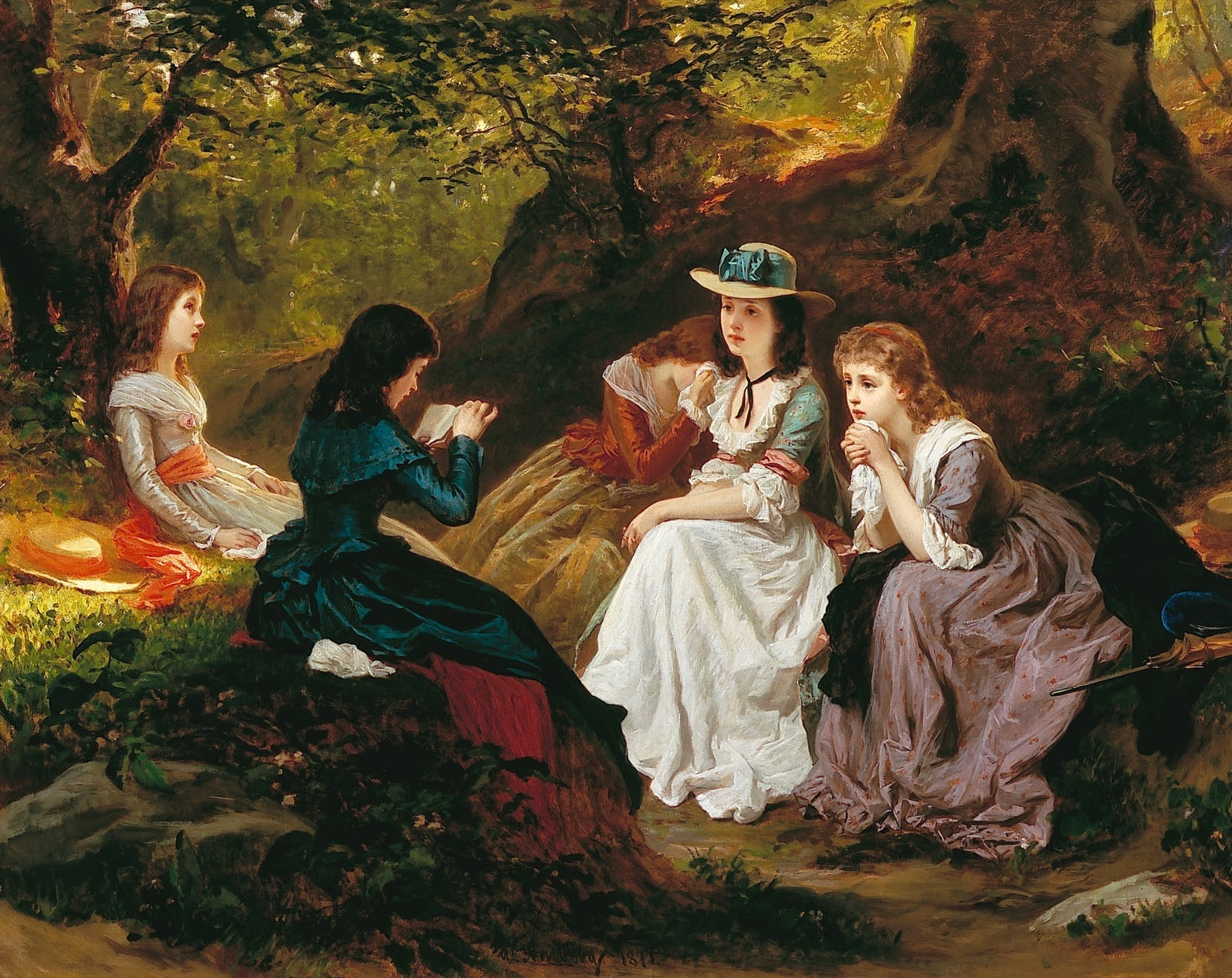
Wilhelm Amberg, Reading from Goethe's Werther

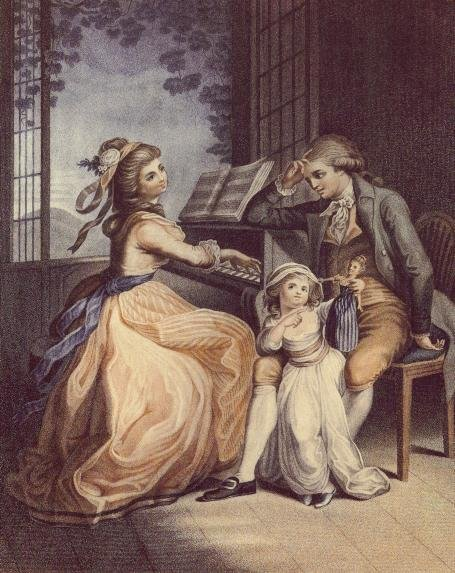
Werther and Lotte, from The Sorrows of Young Werther

In suicidology, a copycat suicide is defined as an emulation of another suicide that the person attempting suicide knows about either from local knowledge or due to accounts or depictions of the original suicide on television and in other media. The publicized suicide serves as a trigger, in the absence of protective factors, for the next suicide by a susceptible or suggestible person. This is referred to as suicide contagion.

A spike in emulation suicides after a widely publicized suicide is known as the Werther effect, after rumours of such a spike following the publication of Goethe's novel The Sorrows of Young Werther.

Suicides occasionally spread through a school system, through a community, or in terms of a celebrity suicide wave, nationally. This is called a suicide cluster. Point clusters are clusters of suicides in both time and space, and have been linked to direct social learning from nearby individuals. Mass clusters are clusters of suicides in time but not space, and have been linked to the broadcasting of information concerning celebrity suicides via the mass media.

== History ==
One of the earliest known associations between the media and suicide arose from Goethe's novel Die Leiden des jungen Werthers (The Sorrows of Young Werther). Soon after its publication in 1774, young men began to mimic the main character by dressing in yellow pants and blue jackets. In the novel, Werther shoots himself with a pistol after he is rejected by the woman he loves, and shortly after its publication there were reports of young men using the same method to kill themselves in acts of hopelessness.

This resulted in the book being banned in several places. Hence the term "Werther effect" is used in the technical literature to designate copycat suicides. The term was coined by researcher David Phillips in 1974.

Reports in 1985 and 1989 by Phillips and his colleagues found that suicides and other accidents seem to rise after a well-publicized suicide.

== Demographic factors ==
People who are young or old – but not middle-aged – seem to be most susceptible to this effect. At least five percent of youth suicides may be influenced by contagion.

Due to the effects of differential identification, the people who attempt to copy a suicidal act tend to have the same age and gender as the triggering suicide.

According to a study from four South Korean researchers, the rate of suicide significantly increased following celebrity suicides between 2005 and 2008. Additionally, substantial upsurges were discovered in the subgroups that corresponded to each celebrity, particularly in the group when all variables (sex, age, and technique) were comparable.

== Timing ==
These suicidal actions tend to happen in the days and sometimes weeks after a suicide is announced. In exceptional cases, such as a widely discussed suicide by a celebrity, an increased level of thinking about suicide may persist for up to one year.

== Factors in suicide reporting ==
Copycat suicide is mostly blamed on the media. A study conducted in 2002 found evidence that "the influence of media on suicidal behaviour has been shown for newspaper and television reports of actual suicides, film and television portrayals of suicides, and suicide in literature, especially suicide manuals." "Hearing about a suicide seems to make those who are vulnerable feel they have permission to do it," Phillips said. He cited studies that showed that people were more likely to engage in dangerous deviant behavior, such as drug taking, if someone else had set the example first.

The Werther effect not only predicts an increase in suicide, but the majority of the suicides will take place in the same or a similar way as the one publicized. The more similar the person in the publicized suicide is to the people exposed to the information about it, the more likely the age group or demographic is to die by suicide. The increase generally happens only in areas where the suicide story was highly publicized. Upon learning of someone else's suicide, some people decide that action may be appropriate for them as well, especially if the publicized suicide was of someone in a situation similar to their own.

Publishing the means of suicides, romanticized and sensationalized reporting—particularly about celebrities, suggestions that there is an epidemic, glorifying the deceased and simplifying the reasons all lead to increases in the suicide rate. People may see suicide as a glamorous ending, with the deceased getting attention, sympathy, and concern that they never got in life. A second possible factor is that vulnerable youth may feel, "If they couldn't cut it, neither can I". An increased rate of suicides has been shown to occur up to ten days after a television report. Studies in Japan and Germany have replicated findings of an imitative effect. Etzersdorfer et al. in an Austrian study showed a strong correlation between the number of papers distributed in various areas and the number of subsequent firearm suicides in each area after a related media report. Higher rates of copycat suicides have been found in those with similarities in race, age, and gender to the deceased in the original report. However, a study from South Korea found that preventative measures restricting how the news reports on suicide do not have much effect, possibly suggesting some other causal factor is at play for changing suicide rates.

Steven Stack analyzed the results from 42 studies and found that those measuring the effect of a celebrity suicide story were 14.3 times more likely to find a copycat effect than studies that did not. Studies based on a real story as opposed to a fictional one were 4.03 times more likely to uncover a copycat effect. Research based on televised stories was 82% less likely to report a copycat effect than research based on newspapers. Other scholars have been less certain about whether copycat suicides truly happen or are selectively hyped. For instance, fears of a suicide wave following the suicide of Kurt Cobain never materialized in an actual increase in suicides. Coverage of Cobain's suicide in the local Seattle area focused largely on treatment for mental health issues, suicide prevention and the suffering Cobain's death caused to his family. Perhaps as a result, the local suicide rate actually declined in the following months.

Furthermore, there is evidence for an indirect Werther effect, i.e. the perception that suicidal media content influences others which, in turn, can concurrently or additionally influence one person's own future thoughts and behaviors. Similarly, the researcher Gerard Sullivan has critiqued research on copycat suicides, suggesting that data analyses have been selective and misleading and that the evidence for copycat suicides is much less consistent than suggested by some researchers. Additionally, a review by Cheng and colleagues finds that most research on the relationship of media coverage to suicidality lacks solid theoretical grounding, making interpreting the research very difficult. Sonia Livingstone argues that research on the effects of media as a whole has many flaws, and needs serious evaluation as a field before additional interpretations can be drawn from such research.

Studies show a high incidence of psychiatric disorders in suicide cases at the time of their death with the total figure ranging from 87.3% to 98%, with mood disorders and substance abuse being the two most common.

== Social proof model ==
An alternate model to explain copycat suicide, called "social proof" by Robert Cialdini, goes beyond the theories of glorification and simplification of reasons to look at why copycat suicides are so similar, demographically and in actual methods, to the originally publicized suicide. In the social proof model, people imitate those who seem similar, despite or even because of societal disapproval. This model is important because it has nearly opposite ramifications for what the media ought to do about the copycat suicide effect than the standard model does. To deal with this problem, Alex Mesoudi of Queen Mary University of London, developed a computer model of a community of 1000 people, to examine how copycat suicides occur. These were divided into 100 groups of 10, in a model designed to represent different levels of social organization, such as schools or hospitals within a town or state. Mesoudi then circulated the simulation through 100 generations. He found the simulated people acted just as sociologists' theory predicted. They were more likely to die by suicide in clusters, either because they had learned this trait from their friends, or because suicidal people are more likely to be like one another.

== Journalism codes ==
Various countries have national journalism codes which attempt to mitigate the possibility of copycat suicides, to varying levels of extremity. In the Norwegian Press Association's 2001 revision of the Ethical Code, it is recommended that "[s]uicide or suicide attempts should not, as a rule, be discussed." The 2005 revision softened the language to emphasize restraint and caution rather than omission. Other national codes take a more moderate approach; in the case of Turkey, they recommend against exaggeration of such events, and that "photography, pictures, visual images or film depicting such cases should not be made public." University of London psychologist Alex Mesoudi recommends that reporters follow the sort of guidelines the World Health Organization and others endorse for coverage of any suicide: use extreme restraint in covering these deaths—keep the word "suicide" out of the headline, don't romanticize the death, and limit the number of stories. While many countries do not have national codes, media outlets still often have in-house guidelines along similar lines. In the United States, there are no industry-wide standards. A survey of in-house guides of 16 US daily newspapers showed that only three mentioned the word suicide, and none gave guidelines about publishing the method of suicide. Craig Branson, online director of the American Society of News Editors (ASNE), has been quoted as saying, "Industry codes are very generic and totally voluntary. Most ethical decisions are left to individual editors at individual papers. The industry would fight any attempt to create more specific rules or standards, and editors would no doubt ignore them." Guidelines on the reporting of suicides in Ireland were introduced with attempt to remove any positive connotations the act might have (e.g. using the term "completed" rather than "successful" when describing a suicide attempt which resulted in a death).

Canada's public broadcaster, the Canadian Broadcasting Corporation, abides by standards that "avoid describing the act in detail or illustrating the method" of suicides.

=== Journalist training ===
Australia is one of the few countries where there is a concerted effort to teach journalism students about this subject. In the 2000s, the Mindframe national media initiative followed an ambivalent response by the Australian Press Council to an earlier media resource kit issued by Suicide Prevention Australia and the Australian Institute for Suicide Research and Prevention. The UK-based media ethics charity MediaWise provides training for journalists on reporting suicide and related issues.

Headline is Ireland's media monitoring programme for suicide and mental health issues, set up by Shine (national mental health organisation) and the Health Service Executives National Office for Suicide Prevention as part of the program Reach Out: National Strategy for action on Suicide Prevention. Headline works with media professionals and students to find ways to collaborate to ensure that suicide, mental health and mental illness are responsibly covered in the media and provides information on reporting on mental health and suicidal behavior, literature and daily analysis of news stories. Headline also serves as a vehicle for the public to become involved in helping to monitor the Irish media on issues relating to mental health and suicide.

Studies suggest that the risk of suicide fell significantly when media outlets began following recommendations for suicide reporting in the late 20th century.

== Prevention ==
The Papageno effect is the effect that mass media can have by presenting non-suicide alternatives to crises. It is named after a lovelorn character, Papageno, from the 18th-century opera The Magic Flute; he was contemplating suicide until other characters showed him a different way to resolve his problems.

If a novel or news can induce self-harm, then it must be assumed that those narratives might have a positive effect on prevention. There is more research into the damage done by "irresponsible media reports" than into the protective effects of positive stories, but when newspapers refuse to publicize suicide events or change the way that they provide information about suicide events, the risk of copycat suicides declines.

== Late twentieth/early twenty-first century research ==
An example occurred in Vienna, Austria where the media reported a dramatic increase of copycat suicides. Reduction began when a working group of the Austrian Association for Suicide Prevention developed media guidelines and initiated discussions with the media which culminated with an agreement to abstain from reporting on cases of suicide. Examples of celebrities whose suicides have triggered suicide clusters include Ruan Lingyu, the Japanese musicians Yukiko Okada and Hide, the South Korean actress Choi Jin-Sil, whose suicide caused suicide rates to rise by 162.3%, the Filipino actress Stella Strada and Marilyn Monroe, whose death was followed by an increase of 200 more suicides than average for that August month. Another famous case is the self-immolation of Mohamed Bouazizi, a Tunisian street vendor who set himself on fire on 17 December 2010, an act that was a catalyst for the Tunisian Revolution and sparked the Arab Spring, including several men who emulated Bouazizi's act.

A notable mid-2010s case of modern digital media contagion is the 2015 suicide of 16-year-old Russian student Renata Kambolina (known online under the pseudonym Rina Palenkova). After posting a final trackside selfie with the caption "nya. bye." ("ня.пока."), her tragic death rapidly went viral on the Russian social network VKontakte. This sparked a dangerous wave of romanticisation that falsely framed her as a virtual idol, prompting numerous vulnerable youths to replicate either her final words, her exact photo framing, or both, during their own suicides or attempted suicides—notably Gleb Korablyov in 2019. Like Kambolina, Korablyov also had his tragic death immediately seized upon and mythologised by internet trolls and morbid online communities. Investigations confirmed that Kambolina had no involvement with the "Blue Whale Challenge" or online "death groups", as they did not exist at the time of her passing. Instead, her story and imagery were retroactively co-opted and weaponised by predatory online administrators to orchestrate a widespread moral panic, fabricate the mythos of a centralized "suicide game", and draw susceptible teenagers into harmful online communities.

A 2017 study published in JAMA Internal Medicine found the online series 13 Reasons Why which chronicled a fictional teen's suicide was associated with an increase in suicide related Internet searches, including a 26% increase in searches for "how to commit suicide", an 18% increase for "commit suicide" and 9% increase for "how to kill yourself". On 29 May 2019, research published in JAMA Psychiatry outlined an association of increased suicides in 10- to 19-year-olds in the United States in the three months following the release of 13 Reasons Why, consistent with a media contagion of suicide in the show. However, some media scholar studies implied that viewing 13 Reasons Why was not associated with suicidal ideation but actually with reduced depressive symptoms.

The cause-and-effect relationship between media and suicide is not simple to prove. Sonia Livingstone emphasized the claim of causality in media-effect cannot be considered conclusive because of different methodological approaches and disciplinary perspective. Even if it is accepted that media can have an effect on suicidal ideation, it is not a sufficient condition to drive people to commit suicide; the effects that media can have on suicidal behaviour are certainly less important than individual psychological and social risk factors.

== See also ==
- Blue Whale Challenge
- Copycat crime
- Epidemiology of suicide
- Herd behavior
- Mass shooting contagion
- Meme
- Sati (practice)
