= Stanisława =

Stanisława may refer to:

- Stanisława, Polish feminine form for the name Stanisław
- Stanisława, Greater Poland Voivodeship, a village in western-central Poland
