= Stacey Tyrell =

Canadian photographer

- Born: Toronto, Ontario
- Education: OCAD University
- Known for: Photographer
- Website: http://www.staceytyrell.com

Stacey Tyrell is a Canadian photographer who currently resides in Brooklyn. Her work predominantly deals with themes of identity, race and heritage as it pertains to post-colonial societies and the Caribbean Diaspora. Tyrell's heritage is influenced by her family history and immigration; she traces her roots to the Caribbean island of Nevis.

Tyrell is recognized for the photo series Backra Bluid, which seeks to "broaden the discussion about what it means to be Black." In these self portraits, Tyrell makes changes to her skin tone and tweaks facial features to "show that if someone were to take a closer look at my face they would see that it might not be that different from their own."

Tyrell is also popularly known for using arts or photos to explore racial identity. Her photographic projects are a reflection of both individual and familial experiences; critically analyzing colonialism, capitalism (in the western canon) and race as social construct.

== Exhibitions ==
Tyrell's work was featured in the 2017 Art Gallery of Windsor exhibition Position As Desired, curated by Kenneth Montague of The Wedge Collection; the title, Position As Desired, was borrowed from her work of the same name.
