= Philip Stack =

American poet

Philip Stack (born John Philip Stack; December 27, 1900 in St. Albans, Vermont – March 4, 1948 in Manhattan, New York), also known under the alias of Don Wahn, was an American poet who was active during the 1930s and 40s. He is known for contributing sonnets to Walter Winchell's widely syndicated Hearst Newspapers column and was also known as the quatrain-writer for Vargas drawings in Esquire. In 1932, Liveright published his book of love poems titled "Love in Manhattan." In 1936 his poem "Admonition" (as Philip Stack) was published by Doubleday in The Best Loved Poems of the American People and the book received a re-printing in 2008.

On March 4, 1948, when he was 47 years old and after battling depression for many years, Philip Stack jumped to his death from the 12th floor of his Manhattan studio at the Goodhue House Apartments. His final contribution to Walter Winchell's column, titled Summary and containing Don Wahn's last despairing lines, was published one day later.
