= Stacey Lee Webber =

American metalsmith (born 1982)

Stacey Lee Webber (born 1982) is an American metalsmith.

== Early life and education ==
A native of Indianapolis, Webber lives and works in Philadelphia. A 2005 BFA graduate of Ball State University, she received her MFA from the University of Wisconsin - Madison in 2008 where Lisa Gralnick, her major professor, offered her a full-time artist assistantship for the three years of her degree program.

== Career ==
She became an artist in residence at Chicago's Lillstreet Art Center in 2009 after receiving a Master of Fine Arts in 2008. In order to fulfill her dream of becoming a full-time artist, Webber relocated to Philadelphia in 2011. She realized her passion in 2015 after working as a production jeweler for a small jewelry firm in Philadelphia and teaching at Tyler School of Art, University of the Arts, and Rowan University for four busy years. Webber has established a profession creating and selling jewelry and artwork, and she currently resides and works on Philadelphia's northeast side.

== Achievements ==
She is known for her sculptures and jewelry made out of reclaimed pennies, although she uses other coins in her work as well. Webber was among the artists featured in the exhibit "40 Under 40: Craft Futures" at the Renwick Gallery of the Smithsonian Museum of American Art, and one of her pieces was subsequently accessioned by the museum. She received an American Craft Council Award of Excellence in both 2013 and 2015.

== Collection highlights ==
- Fralin Museum, University of Georgia, Charlottesville VA
- Racine Art Museum, Racine WI
- David Owley Museum of Art, Ball State University, Muncie IN
- 21C Museum Hotels, USA
- Museum of Fine Arts, Boston MA
- Philadelphia Museum of Fine Arts, PA
- Smithsonian's Renwick Gallery, Washington DC
- Metal Museum, Memphis TN
- Fuller Craft Museum, Brockton MA
- Kamm Teapot Foundation, Statesville NC
- National Archives Foundation, Washington DC
- The University of Wisconsin, School of Business, Madison WI
