= Stacy Tessler Lindau =

American gynecologist

- Born: Bloomfield Hills, Michigan
- Spouse: Peter Lindau

Academic background
- Education: BA, University of Michigan Honors College; Premedical Studies, Bryn Mawr College; MD with Highest Honors, Alpert Medical School of Brown University; Resident, Department of Obstetrics and Gynecology, Northwestern University Feinberg School of Medicine; Chief Administrative Resident, Department of Obstetrics and Gynecology, Northwestern University Feinberg School of Medicine; Fellow, University of Chicago Robert Wood Johnson Foundation Clinical Scholars Program; MAPP, University of Chicago Harris Graduate School of Public Policy Studies

Academic work
- Institutions: University of Chicago; University of Chicago Medical Center

Stacy Tessler Lindau is a tenured professor of Obstetrics and Gynecology and practicing physician at the University of Chicago Medical Center. Her interdisciplinary clinical and lab focuses include cancer survivorship, female sexual dysfunction, population health, and medical ethics.

== Early life and education ==
Tessler Lindau was born to Martin and Sandra Tessler in Bloomfield Hills, Michigan. She earned her Bachelor of Arts degrees in Political Science and Secondary Education from the University of Michigan in 1990, and in 1992, completed her premedical studies at Bryn Mawr College. After graduating from Alpert Medical School of Brown University in 1996, Tessler Lindau completed her residency in the Department of Obstetrics and Gynecology at Northwestern University Feinberg School of Medicine in 1999. In 2000, she acted as Chief Administrative Resident in this same department. In 2002, Tessler Lindau completed her fellowship through the University of Chicago Robert Wood Johnson Foundation Clinical Scholars Program, and later that year she obtained her Master's of Public Policy from the University of Chicago's Harris Graduate School of Public Policy.

== Career ==
Upon completing her bachelor's degree, Tessler Lindau worked at Wall Street Journal Television, a division of Dow Jones & Company, Inc, and received a Health Innovators Fellowship at the Aspen Global Leadership Network. Her experiences volunteering in a hospital ultimately led her to pursue a career in medicine.

She joined the faculty at the University of Chicago Medical Center in 2002. As an assistant professor of obstetrics and gynecology and of medicine-geriatrics, she led the first comprehensive national survey of sexual attitudes, behaviors and problems among older adults in the United States. She also studied the quality of sexual education in Illinois public schools and found that one out of three teachers failed to provide students with a comprehensive education. In 2008, Tessler Lindau found that older American adults were at a higher risk for drug interactions due to intense therapy for chronic illness and improved access to medications due to Medicare.

Tessler Lindau is the founder and director of the Program in Integrative Sexual Medicine (PRISM) for Women and Girls with Cancer and leads interdisciplinary initiatives aimed at improving access to health and social services for older adults. She was the lead author of a study that found over 40% of women who survived breast and gynecologic cancers wanted medical help for their sexual issues but chose not to pursue it. In a 2011 study published in the journal Cancer, she wrote that cancer survivors were affected by both physical and psychological issues after cancer treatments including pain, dryness, loss of desire, difficulty with arousal and orgasm, and changes in body appearance due to treatments.

=== NowPow and CommunityRx ===
In 2012, Tessler Lindau's laboratory received a $5.9 million award from the Center for Medicare and Medicaid Innovation to develop technology linking patients to community services. Using this funding, she developed NowPow, a "personalized community referral platform for every need and every person." Tessler Lindau with Rachel Kohler lead NowPow and expanded the operations into a 90-person startup supporting about 24,000 care professionals. Prior to the implementation of NowPow, it went through three years of studying which resulted in a digital referral platform called CommunityRx. The program was expected to assist 200,000 people in Illinois be linked with up-to-date information about community-based services and resources. In 2017, Tessler Lindau and Kohler began partnering with NYC Health + Hospitals who wished to use CommunityRx to address concerns regarding food and housing insecurities amongst patients.

=== WomanLab ===
WomanLab is a virtual platform founded and directed by Stacy Tessler Lindau. Its mission is to provide evidence-based information and resources so that “every woman — and everyone who loves and cares for women — can learn truths about sex,” especially in the context of health conditions such as cancer, aging, and other common health challenges.

Under Tessler Lindau's leadership, WomanLab also functions as a hub for translating academic and clinical findings into actionable guidance, patient materials, and outreach: for example, videos and educational resources discussing issues like dyspareunia (painful intercourse) in otherwise healthy women, or the sexual health challenges faced by cancer survivors.

=== MAPS Corps ===
MAPSCorps (Meaningful, Active, Productive Science in Service to Communities) is a youth-employing, community-asset–mapping nonprofit co-founded by Stacy Tessler Lindau. MAPSCorps began in 2008–2009 based on an asset-based, community-engaged research approach developed by Lindau's lab at the University of Chicago.

The program hires high school and college–aged youth, often from underrepresented or high-poverty communities, to conduct comprehensive “feet-on-the-street” censuses of public-facing businesses, organizations, and community resources (e.g., food resources, services, community centers) within target neighborhoods.

=== Bionic Breast project ===
The Bionic Breast Project is an interdisciplinary research initiative led by Stacy Tessler Lindau at the University of Chicago, aiming to restore breast sensation and reduce chronic pain for women who have undergone mastectomy and reconstructive surgery.

The project intends to develop an implantable neuroprosthetic device: a combination of pressure sensors under the skin of reconstructed breasts, peripheral-nerve electrodes targeting intercostal nerves, and electrical stimulation designed to recreate touch sensation and address loss of sensory function and associated pain after mastectomy.

In 2023 the project was awarded a major grant, US$3.99 million from the National Cancer Institute (NCI), to begin early clinical trials of the device.

Tessler Lindau has described the Bionic Breast Project as part of a broader effort to shift breast reconstruction beyond cosmetic restoration: to restore function, embodiment, and sexual health for survivors.

== Honors and awards ==
- 1993 - John A. Hartford Foundation Student Fellowship, Department of Geriatrics, Mt. Sinai Hospital, New York, NY
- 1996 - Jack and Edna Saphier Prize, Alpert Medical School at Brown University
- 1996 - GlaxoWellcome Achievement Award, American Medical Association
- 1996 - Leah J. Dickstein MD Student Creativity and Leadership Award, Association of Women Psychiatrists
- 1996 - Janet M. Glasgow Memorial Achievement Citation, American Medical Women's Association
- 1998 - Parke Davis Scholarship, Association of Professors of Gynecology and Obstetrics
- 2000 - Ralph Reis Research Award, Department of OB/GYN, Northwestern University Feinberg School of Medicine
- 2000 - Department of OB/GYN Chairman's Award, Northwestern University Feinberg School of Medicine
- 2000 - Dr. Susan Perlman Award, Northwestern Memorial Hospital
- 2000 - Outstanding Resident Teacher Award, Northwestern University Feinberg School of Medicine
- 2003 - New Investigator Award, American Geriatrics Society
- 2003 - Chicago Lying-In Pin for Outstanding Medical Student Teaching, The University of Chicago Pritzker School of Medicine
- 2007 - Thomas W. McEllin Lectureship, Department of OB/GYN, Evanston Hospital, NorthShore University HealthSystem
- 2007 - Outstanding Excellence in Geriatric Research-All Categories, American Geriatrics Society
- 2009 - Best Poster Award in Biology: Sex Hormones and Female Sexual Function in Later Life, Annual Meeting of the International Society for the Study of Women's Sexual Health
- 2011-2012 - Fellow, Committee on Institutional Cooperation Academic Leadership Program
- 2013 - Vision and Impact Award, American Committee for the Weizmann Institute of Science: Midwest Region
- 2014 - Inspirations in Medicine: The Physician/Patient Perspective Award, American Medical Association
- 2016-2018 - Fellow, Aspen Institute Health Innovators Fellowship and Member, Aspen Global Leadership Network
- 2017 - Recipient on behalf of NowPow, Chicago Innovation Up-and-Comer Award, Technology, Chicago Innovation
- 2018 - Recipient on behalf of NowPow, Erie Family Health Center Health Innovation Award, Erie Family Health Center
- 2018 - Health and Wellness Award, Greater Auburn Gresham Development Corporation
- 2018 - Senior Faculty Scholar, Bucksbaum Institute for Clinical Excellence, University of Chicago
- 2018 - Best Tech StartUp in Chicago for NowPow, Timmy Awards
- 2019 - Top 10 (of ~1100) for NowPow, Accenture Global HealthTech Challenge
