= Stacy Blake-Beard =

American academic

Stacy Blake-Beard is a tenured professor of management at the Simmons College School of Management in Massachusetts. She has been teaching organizational behavior at Simmons College since 2002. She was previously Assistant Professor of Administration, Planning, and Social Policy at the Harvard University Graduate School of Education, and lectured at the Harvard Graduate School of Education on organizational behavior, cultural diversity in organizations, and mentoring relationships at work.

In her research, Blake-Beard examines mentoring relationships in the context of gender and workforce diversity. Her research has been published in the Journal of Career Development, the Academy of Management Executive, the Psychology of Women Quarterly, Journal of Management Development, the Journal of Business Ethics, Human Resource Management Journal and The Diversity Factor. Blake-Beard’s work has also focused on the dynamics of formal mentoring programs in the corporate environment, team building, gender and leadership. For her project “Systems of Sustenance and Support: Exploring the Impact of Mentoring on the Career Experiences of Indian Women” pursued in cooperation with the Center for Leadership, Innovation and Change at the Indian School of Business in Hyderabad, Blake-Beard was granted a 2010-2011 Fulbright Award. Blake-Beard also consults for several organizations. She has a BS in Psychology from the University of Maryland, an MA and a Ph.D. in organizational psychology from the University of Michigan.

== Selected publications ==
- Wasserman, I. & Blake-Beard, S. (2010). “Leading inclusively: Mind-sets, skills and actions for a diverse, complex world.” In K.A. Bunker, D.T. Hall, & K.E. Kram (Eds.), Extraordinary leadership: Addressing the gaps in senior executive development (pp. 197–212). San Francisco, CA: Jossey-Bass.
- Shapiro, M., Ingols, C., Blake-Beard, S. & O’Neill, R. (2009). “Canaries in the mine shaft: Women signaling a new career model.” People & Strategy, 32(3), 52–59.
- Blake-Beard, S.D. (2009). “Mentoring as a bridge to understanding cultural differences.” Adult Learning, 20(1&2), 14-18.
- Fletcher, J., Bailyn, L. & Blake-Beard, S. (2009). “Practical pushing: Creating discursive space in organizational narratives.” In J.W. Cox, T. LeTrent-Jones, D. Weir, & M. Voronov (Eds.), Critical management studies at work: Multidisciplinary approaches to negotiating tensions between theory and practice (pp. 82–93). St. Louis, MO: Elsevior.
- Hunt, L., LaRoche, G., Blake-Beard, S., Chin, E., Arroyave, M., & Scully, M. (2009). “Cross-cultural connections: Leveraging social networks for women’s advancement.” In M. Barreto, M.K. Ryan & M.T. Schmitt (Eds), The glass ceiling in the 21st century: Understanding barriers to gender equality. Washington, DC: American Psychological Association.
- Shapiro, M., Ingols, C. & Blake-Beard, S. (2008). “Confronting career double-binds: Implications for women and organizations.” Journal of Career Development, 34(3), 309–333.
- Bearman, S., Blake-Beard, S.D., Hunt, L. & Crosby, F.J. (2007). "Future mentoring research: Cutting across mentoring themes and contexts." In T.D. Allen & L.T. Eby (Eds), Blackwell handbook of mentoring: A multiple perspectives approach. Malden, MA: Blackwell Publishing.
- Scully, M.A. & Blake-Beard, S.D. (2006). “Locating class in organizational diversity work: Class as structure, style and process.” In P. Prasad, A. Konrad & J. Pringle (Eds), Handbook of Workplace Diversity. Thousand Oaks, CA: Sage.
- Blake-Beard, S.D., Murrell, A.J. & Thomas, D.A. (2007). “Unfinished business: The impact of race on understanding mentoring relationships." In B.R. Ragins & K.E. Kram (Eds), The handbook of mentoring. Thousand Oaks, CA: Sage.
- Downing, R.A. Crosby, F.J. & Blake-Beard, S.D. (2005). “The perceived importance of developmental relationships on women undergraduates’ pursuit of science.” Psychology of Women Quarterly.
- Blake-Beard, S.D. & Morgan-Roberts, L. (2004). “Releasing the double bind of visibility of minorities in the workplace.” CGO Commentaries No. 4. Boston, MA: Center for Gender in
- Crosby, F.J. & Blake-Beard, S.D. (2004). “Affirmative action: Diversity, merit and the benefit of white people.” In M. Fine, L. Weis, L. Powell and A. Burns (Eds.), Off White: Readings in Power, Privilege and Resistance, publisher, city, page numbers.
- Blake-Beard, S.D. (2003). “Critical trends and shifts in the mentoring experiences of professional women.” CGO Insights, No.15. Boston, MA: Center for Gender in Organizations, Simmons School of Management.
