= Annie Stack =

Annie Stack was well known around Toodyay, Western Australia, as an energetic and resourceful Noongar woman.

Although locals recall her being strong-willed and fierce if crossed, she had their respect as a hard-worker and being business-like in her dealings. She managed a team of workers based at her camp at Culham and contracted out their labour. Stack could also be wily when it came to dealing with authorities, especially when it involved her children. She had good reason given the government policies of the day, now referred to as the Stolen Generations, and the battles she had to fight, and often lost to regain them from the Moore River Settlement.

== Personal life ==
Stack was born in 1894 at Culham, a farming area north of the town of Toodyay. The Aboriginal camp where she was based was along Chatcup Road east of Culham homestead, and known as Djudjerin. While the details of her life and family are still the subject of research, it is known her mother, Maggie Townsend came from the Pilbara region and her father may have been Christian Danbury. In 1912 Stack married James Yerbal who was also known as James Stack of New Norcia. Her second marriage was to Joseph Jackamurra also of New Norcia. It is believed she had about five children, Abraham, Kathleen, John, George Richard and Lila, and that some or all of them were from her second marriage.

During the 1930s Stack married for the third time to Wilfred Morrison. A boy Benjamin Wilson Morrison was born at Pinjarra on 2 November 1932. Ben was educated at the New Norcia mission. Around 1938 the family were living in a camp at Guildford, and spent some time at Moore River. They also moved about visiting and living in various camps in the Wheatbelt region and in the Swan Valley. Stack's life had its share of incidents. These were reported in the press and recorded by the authorities providing some details of where she was living at the time and the names of her extended family. (Note: For example in August 1939 Stack was charged with assaulting Joseph Parfitt, in Northam, though she stated it was an accident.) One serious incident in 1944, in which Stack and her daughter Jean were assaulted by Jean's husband, left her in Northam Hospital for a fortnight.

In 1940 her son Ben was sent to Moore River Native Settlement and kept there until 1950. Stack, who gained a reputation for being bad tempered and probably seen as a nuisance by the authorities, had been labelled an "expelled" woman. This meant she was not allowed entry to the place and was refused permission to see her son Benjamin. (Note: Ben Morrison’s death in the Fremantle lockup, when he was aged 55 years, was to be part of the 1980-1989 Deaths in Custody enquiry.) There were other incidents involving hiding children, they may or may not have been her own, and misleading police about their whereabouts and perhaps to whom they actually belonged to.

== Work life ==
From the 1940s in Toodyay, Stack and her Culham team undertook contracts for land-clearing and fencing, charging at a per acre rate. They also collected wool from dead sheep, and fleece that had been caught in fencing wire. The wool was baled and sold to Woolcox-Mofflin, a firm based in the metropolitan area, for scouring.

Stack was well known to the local shopkeepers in Toodyay. She helped needy friends by promising to pay their bills, which she always did, and there is the famous story about how she argued with the local butchers about not paying for kangaroo meat. After all, it was a native animal, it had been here before the Europeans, and by rights belonged to the Aboriginal people.

Stack's reputation was such that she became known as the "Queen of Toodyay". Locals remember her as a tall woman with white hair, and plenty of character. This is captured in the lively portrait taken of her by professional photographer Alex Risco who had a studio in Northam. (Note: The photograph is held by the Toodyay Historical Society Inc. Alex Risco was a Russian migrant who came to Western Australia after the Second World War.) The portrait was titled "Queen of Toodyay". Whether the title was based on local lore, or that was how she perceived herself is something we may never know.
