= Stacey Smith =

Stacey or Stacy Smith may refer to:

- Stacy Smith (news anchor) (born c. 1949), American news anchor
- Stacey Smith (figure skater) (born 1954), American ice dancer
- Stacey Smith? (born 1972), Australian-Canadian mathematician
- Stacey-Ann Smith (born 1991), American sprinter
- Stacey Smith, British judoka in Judo at the 1991 European Youth Olympic Days
- Stacey Smith, American golfer, winner of the 2000 NCAA Division III Women's Golf Championships
- Stacy Smith, actress in the 2002 film Marion Bridge
- Stacy Smith, Miss Virgin Islands 2006
- Stacey Smith, Canadian curler in the 2009 Ontario Scotties Tournament of Hearts
- Stacey Smith, British runner in Athletics at the 2011 Summer Universiade – Women's 1500 metres
