= Sam Richardson (artist) =

American post-war artist, and art educator

Sam Richardson (1934–2013) was an American artist known for small-scale, minimalist landscape sculptures, and for his work as a printmaker.

Richardson was awarded a 1975 Individual Artist Fellowship from the National Endowment for the Arts. He is considered an American Postwar artist.

The Anderson Collection at Stanford University writes of Richardson's legacy, [his] "small-scaled, finely crafted poetic sculptures influenced a generation of artists and students and helped push the boundaries of landscape art in the West."

== Early life and education ==
Richardson was born in Oakland, California. He had a BA and MFA from the California College of Arts and Crafts.

== Career ==
Early in his career Richardson was the Art Director of the American Craft Council and the Museum of Contemporary Craft.

His began making art as a painter. In the 1960s, he became interested in the surface of the canvases which led to shaping and forming painting supports in three dimensions. In the late 60s he began making sculptures.

According to Tandem Press, "Richardson pioneered a new type of sculptural landscape, and although he embraced new themes and shifted directions many times during his career, much of his work focused on the unpeopled, anonymous landscapes of his imagination."

Richardson was a Professor of Art at San José State University.

Richardson noted, "As my work has moved through various phases--each with a specific focus of investigation--I have called upon my fascination with storytelling (sometimes truth, sometimes fiction) and incorporated that interest with the formal elements of shape, line, and color."

An introduction to his work in 2019 at the University of Buffalo claims, "Known for his landscape sculptures made of plastic and resin, Sam Richardson (1934-2013) helped initiate new ways of thinking about landscape art in the late 1960s and 70s. Stripped of roads, buildings, debris and any sign of human interference, Richardson’s landscapes push the viewer into a quiet zone of tranquil free association; it’s a place that may seem familiar, but is also non-specific enough to create a space for one’s own experiences."

His works are featured in prominent collections including the Dallas Museum of Fine Art, the Denver Art Museum, the Indianapolis Museum of Art, the San Francisco Museum of Modern Art, the Pomer Institute of Fine Arts in Australia, the Smithsonian’s Hirshhorn Museum, the National Museum of American Art in Washington DC, and the Whitney Museum of American Art in New York.

== Significant Exhibitions ==
- Sam Richardson, Human Resources, Los Angeles, California, 2021.
- Sam Richardson: Islands, Ice, and Sand, The Anderson Collection at Stanford University, Stanford, California, 2021.
- Sam Richardson: Intimate Landscape, University at Buffalo Art Galleries, 2019.
- Toolery, solo exhibition, Barbara Anderson Gallery, Berkeley, California, 2005.
- San Francisco International Art Expo (with Tandem Press), 2005.
- Scents of Purpose, The Contemporary Jewish Museum, San Francisco, 2005.
- Selections: 35th Anniversary Exhibition, San Jose Museum of Art, California, 2004.
- Color in Space: Sam Richardson Retrospective, San Jose Institute of Contemporary Art, 2002.
- The Anderson Collection, San Francisco Museum of Modern Art, 2000.
- Solo exhibition, Gwenda Jay/Addington Gallery, Chicago, 1999.
- Facing Eden: 100 Years of Landscape Art in the Bay Area, M.H. deYoung Memorial Museum, 1995.

== Significant Works ==
- It's A Cold Day on That Guy's Beach, 1968, Whitney Museum of American Art.
- A Very Thick Summer Overcast Extending Inland near Antioch, California, 1969. Smithsonian American Art Museum.
- It’s a Cool October Evening with a Little Lake at the Base of that Hill, 1969. Smithsonian American Art Museum.
- It’s Darker in the Valley, 1969. Smithsonian American Art Museum.
- It’s Getting Darker on the East Side of That Island because the Sun Is Setting in the West, 1970. Smithsonian American Art Museum.
- Sierra Snow at 3:00, 1973.
- It Is Summer and the Tree Waits on Top of That Hill, 1972. Smithsonian American Art Museum.
- Sierra Snow: Sunrise on East Face, 1974. Smithsonian American Art Museum.
- Sierra Snow Cover On The North Ridge, 1974. University at Buffalo, NY.
- Fleet, 2005.
