= Stacy Mitchhart =

American songwriter (born 1959)

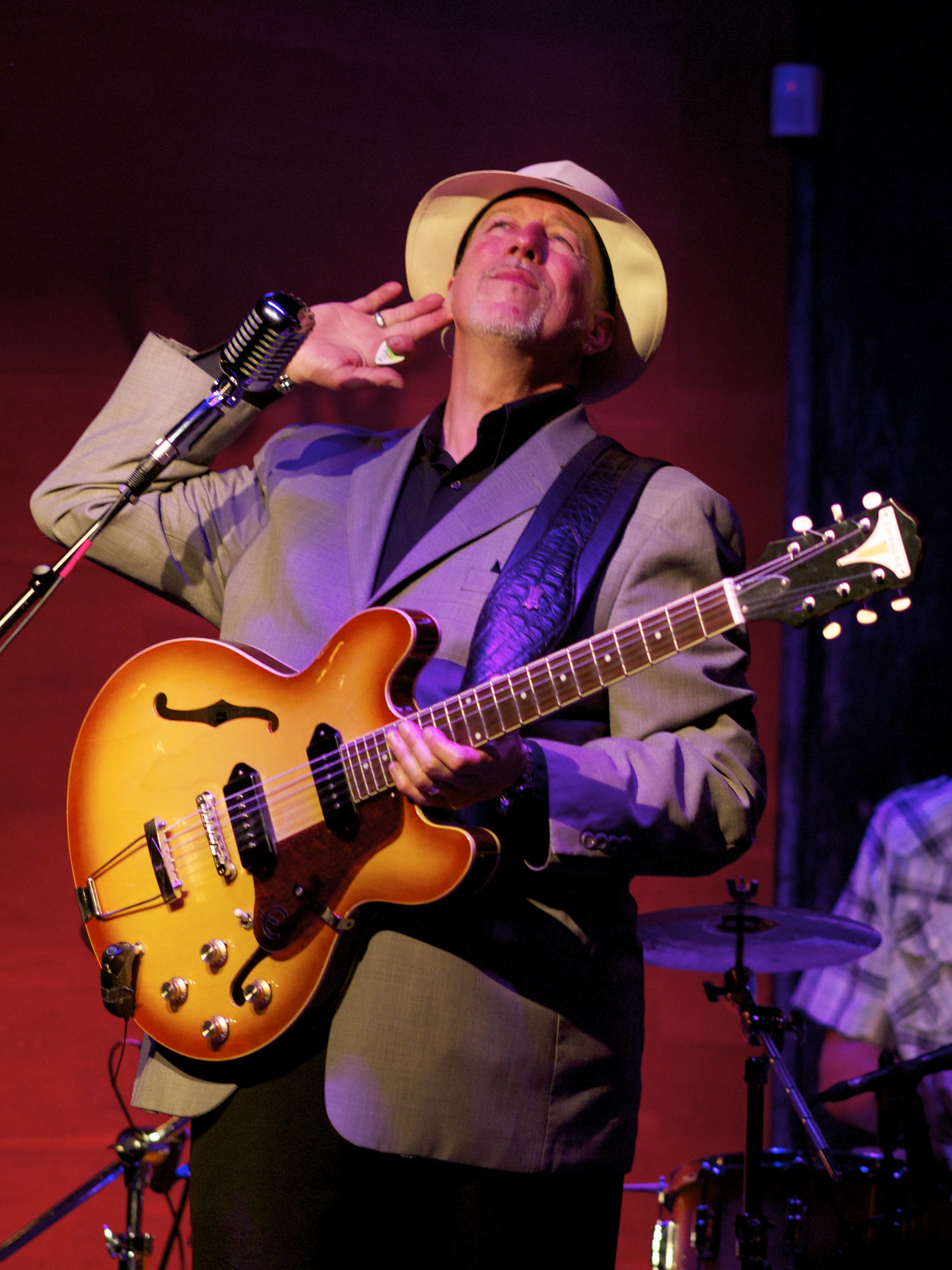
- Stacy Mitchhart performing at Sambuca in the Gulch, Nashville, May 2013

Background information
- Born: February 16, 1959 (age 66); Cincinnati, Ohio, United States
- Genres: Blues; R&B
- Occupations: Musician; singer; songwriter
- Years active: 2000s–present
- Website: stacymitchhart.com

Stacy Mitchhart (born February 16, 1959) is an American blues guitarist. He began his professional career in Cincinnati, Ohio playing the club circuit there and gaining widespread attention in the early 1990s. In 1996, he moved to Nashville taking up residence as part of the house band at the Bourbon Street Blues and Boogie Bar in famous Printer's Alley, in downtown Nashville.

In 2003, Mitchhart received the Albert King Most Promising Guitarist Award at the Blues Foundation's International Blues Challenge in Memphis. His album, Gotta Get The Feeling Back Again album was considered for a Grammy Award in 2008. He was inducted into the South Canadian Blues Hall Of Fame in 2016.

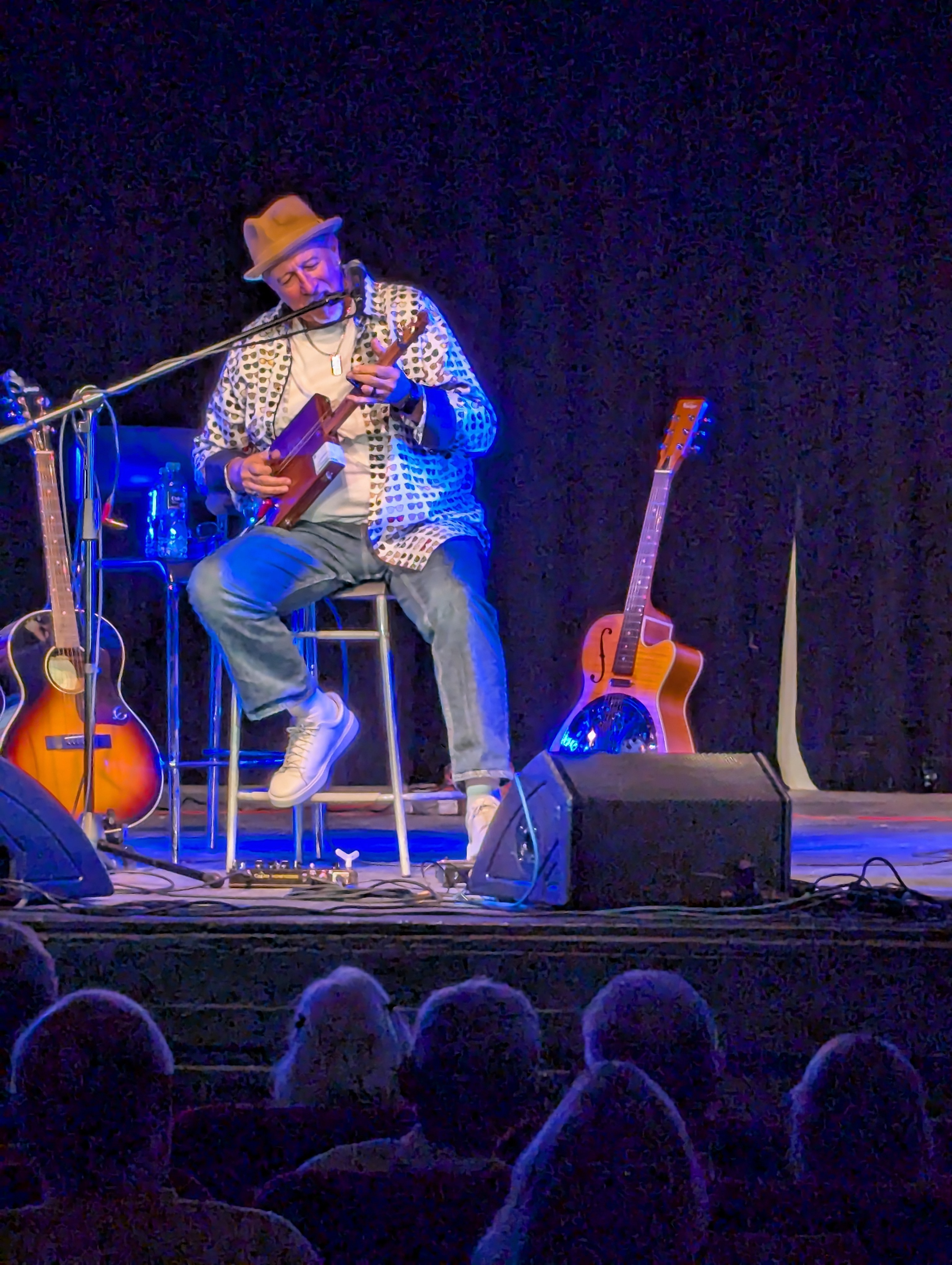
Mitchhart playing a cigar box guitar he made at the Bromley Blues club inBromley Little Theatre, England, July 2025

He is married to Tawana Mitchhart and they have 3 children: Kenzie, Milan (deceased) and CJ. They live in Nashville. In addition to playing music he is a luthier who makes cigar box guitars which he plays and sells to support his wife's charity.

== Discography ==
- 1993 Blues Transfusion
- 1994 Simple Medicine
- 1995 Live From the Slippery Noodle Inn Vol. III
- 1997 Stacy Mitchhart and Blues-U-Can-Use "Live" at Bourbon Street Blues and Boogie Bar
- 1998 Bourbon Street Blues and Boogie Bar... Nothin' But
- 2001 What I Feel
- 2004 Midnight Breeze
- 2005 Stacy Mitchhart Live! in Concert
- 2006 I'm A Good Man
- 2007 Gotta Get The Feeling Back Again
- 2009 Live From B.B. King's
- 2011 ‘’Grown Ass Man’’
- 2015 ‘’Live My Life’’
- 2017 ‘’Stacy Mitchhart’’
- 2019 ‘’Bring It On Home’’
