= Steven Stack =

American sociologist

- Education: University of Connecticut
- Known for: Suicide prevention
- Awards: 2004 Ig Nobel Prize (with James Gundlach)
- Scientific career
- Fields: Sociology; Criminology
- Workplaces: Wayne State University
- Thesis: Inequality in Industrial Society: Income Distribution in Capitalist and Socialist Nations (1976)

Steven Stack is an American sociologist and professor in the Department of Criminal Justice at Wayne State University, where he is also an adjunct professor in the Department of Psychiatry & Behavioral Neuroscience.

He is known for his research on suicide prevention, including on the effects of media coverage of suicides on copycat suicides. He has also researched other forms of violence, including homicide and murder-suicide.

== Awards ==
In 2003, Stack received the Louis Dublin Award from the American Association of Suicidology. Along with Auburn University's James Gundlach, Stack received the 2004 Ig Nobel Prize for medicine for a 1992 study they co-authored on the relationship between country music and suicide rates. In 2017, he became the first sociologist to receive the International Association for Suicide Prevention's Erwin Stengel Award.
