= Charles Stack (rugby union) =

Irish rugby union player

- Full name: Charles Robert Rowan Stack
- Born: 30 September 1867 Lifford, County Donegal, Ireland
- Died: 22 November 1944 (aged 77) County Donegal, Ireland

Rugby union career
- Position: Forward
International career
Years	Team	Apps	(Points)
1889	Ireland	1	(0)

Charles Robert Rowan Stack (30 September 1867 — 22 November 1944) was an Irish international rugby union player.

Educated at Trinity College Dublin, Stack was a varsity rugby player and gained an Ireland cap in 1889, appearing against Scotland at Belfast. He also rowed for Trinity College.

Stack was ordained as a priest by the Bishop of Bath and Wells in 1892. He served as a military chaplain during World War I and for many years was the vicar of the Holy Trinity Church in Frome, Somerset.

== See also ==
- List of Ireland national rugby union players
