= Jim Love (artist) =

American sculptor

- Love in 1961
- Born: 1927
- Died: May 10, 2005 (aged 77–78)
- Education: Baylor University
- Known for: Sculpture
- Movement: Modernism

Jim Love, Can Johnny Come Out and Play? bronze, 1990–91, Museum of Fine Arts, Houston

Jim Love (1927 – May 10, 2005) was an American modernist sculptor who was born in Amarillo, Texas. He graduated from Baylor University in 1952 with a baccalaureate in business administration. After graduation, He moved to Houston, Texas. He rose to prominence in 1961 when his assemblages of found objects were included in the groundbreaking exhibition The Art of Assemblage at the Museum of Modern Art in New York City. Jim Love died in May 2005. Margaret McDermott, wife of University of Texas at Dallas founder Eugene McDermott presented the Jack sculpture to the university in 1976. The sculpture is affectionately known on campus as the Love Jack. In May 2021, the "Love Jack" was moved to a more central location on the UTD campus.
