= John Stack =

John Stack may refer to:

- John K. Stack Jr. (1884–1935), Michigan Auditor General
- John M. Stack (1852–1927), American politician
- John F. Stack (1950–2022), American professor of politics, international relations, and law
- John Stack (politician) (1845–1897), Irish nationalist politician, Member of Parliament (MP) for North Kerry 1885–1892
- John Stack (rower) (1924–1997), American rower, gold medallist at the 1948 Summer Olympics
- John Stack (engineer), (1906–1972) American aerospace engineer, won two Collier trophies
