= Stacy Johnson =

Stacy Johnson or Stacey Johnson may refer to:

== Stacy Johnson ==
- Stacy Johnson (singer) (1945–2017) American R&B singer and songwriter
- Stacy Johnson (born 1981 or 1982), Miss Utah 2003
- Stacy May-Johnson (born 1984), American softball player

== Stacey Johnson ==
- Stacey Johnson (fencer), American Olympic fencer
- Stacey Johnson, British runner at the 2008 European Cross Country Championships
