= Edward Stack =

Edward Stack may refer to:

- Edward Stack (U.S. Marine Corps officer) (1756–1833), officer in the United States Marine Corps during the American Revolutionary War
- Edward Stack (Wisconsin politician) (1918–2006), member of the Wisconsin State Assembly
- Edward J. Stack (1910–1989), U.S. Representative from Florida
- Edward W. Stack, American CEO and businessman
