= Stacey Thomas (American football) =

American football player (born 1984)

No. 43
- Position: Strong safety

Personal information
- Born: December 4, 1984 (age 41); New Orleans, Louisiana, U.S.
- Listed height: 6 ft 0 in (1.83 m)
- Listed weight: 215 lb (98 kg)

Career information
- College: Texas Southern

Career history
- 2007: Buffalo Bills*
- 2009–2011: Dauphins de Nice
- 2009–2012: Oulu Northern Lights
- 2013: Seinajoki Crocodiles
- 2014: Calanda Broncos
- 2015: Porvoo Butchers
- 2016: Wasa Royals
- 2017: Wasa Royals
- 2018: Wasa Royals
- * Offseason or practice squad member only

Awards and highlights
- SWAC Defensive Player of the Year (2006)

Stacey Thomas (born December 4, 1984) is an American former football strong safety. Thomas played professionally in Europe from 2009 to 2018. He has represented Dauphins de Nice in France and Oulu Northern Lights and Seinäjoki Crocodiles in the Finnish Division I and Maple League. Thomas played for the Swiss team Calanda Broncos in 2014. Most recently he returned to Finnish Division I with Porvoo Butchers in 2015. In April 2016 he signed a two-year contract with Finnish Maple League team Wasa Royals. Thomas officially retired after 2018 season and owns a gym in Vaasa.

Thomas has NFL experience with the Buffalo Bills as an offseason member. Coming out of Texas Southern University Thomas was originally signed by the Bills as an undrafted free agent in 2007. He was released on July 27 that year .
