= Stace =

Stace is a surname and a given name, the latter sometimes as a diminutive of Stacy or Stacey.

Notable people with the name include:

Surname

- Aileen Stace (1895–1977), New Zealand craftswoman
- Arthur Stace (1884–1967), Australian religious graffiti artist
- Clive A. Stace (born 1938), British botanist and botanical author
- Esther Stace (1871/1872–1918), Australian equestrian
- Helen McRae Stace (1850–1926), New Zealand school matron
- Walter Terence Stace (1886–1967), British philosopher and civil servant
- Wesley Stace (born 1965), British musician and novelist who uses the stage name John Wesley Harding

Given name

- Stace England, American musician
- Stace Victor Murray Clube (born 1934), English astrophysicist
- Stace Nelson (born 1967), South Dakota politician
