= Stacey Sinclair =

American psychologist (born 1971)

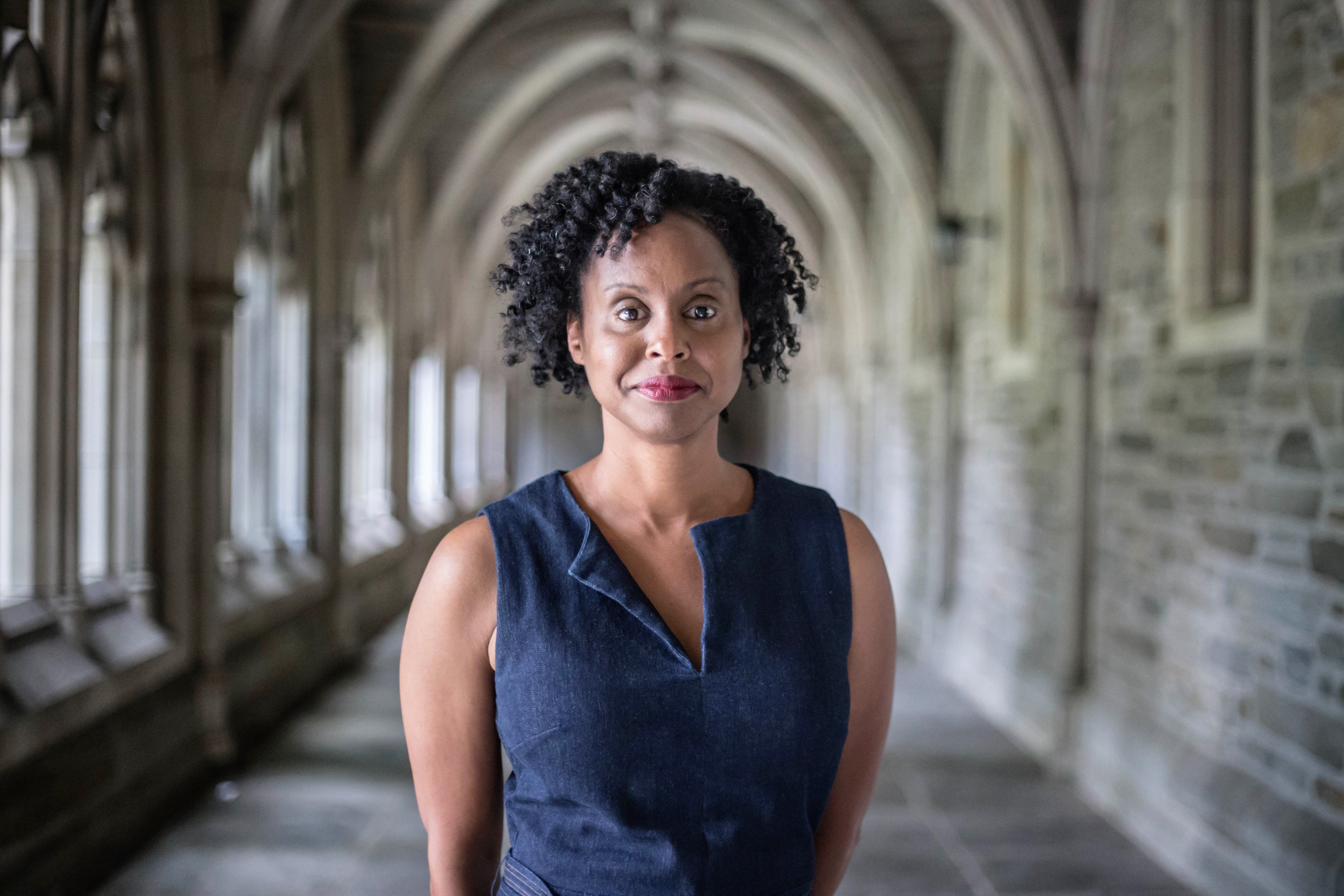
- Sinclair at Princeton University in 2018
- Born: May 31, 1971 (age 55); Brooklyn, New York, U.S.
- Education: Stanford University, University of California Los Angeles (M.A. and Ph.D)
- Spouse: Joseph Barnes
- Children: 2

Stacey Sinclair (born May 31, 1971) is an American psychologist and professor of psychology and public affairs, and associate professor of African American studies at Princeton University. Her research focuses on how interpersonal interactions translate culturally held prejudices into individual thoughts and actions.

== Personal life ==
Stacey Sinclair was born on May 31, 1971, in Brooklyn, New York. She was born to Alice and Ronald Sinclair. Her mother, Alice, worked as a Registered Nurse Midwife and her father, Ronald, worked as a Residential Property Manager Executive. Sinclair lived in the Bronx Borough of New York City until she was 9 years old. After this, her family moved to the San Fernando Valley in southern California. While there, she attended James Monroe High School. She now lives with her husband, Joseph Barnes, and has two children.

== Education and career ==
In 1992, Sinclair received Bachelor of Arts degrees, from Stanford University, in psychology and economics. She received her master's degree in social psychology in 1993 and a Ph.D. in 1999, both from the University of California, Los Angeles (UCLA).

Sinclair joined the psychology department at the University of Virginia in 1999 as an assistant professor, becoming an associate professor in 2006. In 2008, she became an associate professor in the Psychology and African American studies departments at Princeton University. She's currently a Full Professor and teaches in both the Department of Psychology and the School of Public and International Affairs at Princeton University.

She is currently Head of Mathey College.

== Honors and awards ==
Sinclair's honors and awards include:

- Fellow, American Psychological Society (2016)
- Fellow, Society for Personality and Social Psychology (2012)
- Fellow, Society for Psychological Study of Social Issues (2007)
- Fellow, Society of Experimental Social Psychology (2006)
- National Science Foundation Pre-doctoral Minority Fellowship (1992-1996)

== Research ==
In her publications, Sinclair focuses on intergroup attitudes and implicit biases. Some of her representative publications include studies about interracial anxiety in movement and the effects of implicit racial biases on performance. She has other works on implicit bias –– both as a factor in racial disparities in academic achievement and in interpersonal interactions among whites.
