= Gael Stack =

Gael Stack (born 1941-2026) is a Texas painter. She lives in Houston and has work in the permanent collections of several museums. Stack has worked as a professor at the University of Houston, serving as the art school's director in 2004 and 2005.

== Biography ==
Stack was born in Chicago, Illinois and attended Catholic school. In 1970, she received a BFA from the University of Illinois, Urbana-Champaign and in 1972, an MFA from Southern Illinois University, Carbondale. Stack moved to Houston in 1973. She first started earning income as a secretary in Houston.

Stack was honored with the Moores Professorship in 1999 and served as the Director of the University of Houston's school of art from 2004 to 2005.

== Work ==
Gael Stack's work is unique and is sometimes misunderstood. She places letter-like figures onto dark backgrounds. She creates a relationship between the two dimensions. Her art is dark, yet many people see the layers behind them. She was a single mother raising two sons and the feminist movement resonated with her, influencing her "to have her art reflect her reality." However, critic Alison de Lima Greene emphasizes that her art is not just autobiographical, but it is also very literary, borrowing motifs from other paintings and stories. Stack is interested in exploring "language and its limits" and depicting moments in human life through her art. People confused her work for scribbles on a dark background, however, these figures represented parts of her life. She refuses to talk about her work in detail and allows people to interpret and remember them differently.

Her work is collected by the Beaux Art Museum, the Museum of Fine Arts, Houston, the Dallas Museum of Art, the San Antonio Museum of Art, the El Paso Museum of Art, the Blanton Museum of Art and the Museum of Contemporary Art San Diego.
