= Stacey Katu =

Cook Island international rugby league footballer

Personal information
- Born: 8 November 1983 (age 42)

Playing information
- Position: Prop
Club
Years	Team	Pld	T	G	FG	P
2003	South Sydney Rabbitohs	2	0	0	0	0
Representative
Years	Team	Pld	T	G	FG	P
2006	Cook Islands	3	0	0	0	0

Stacey Katu (born 8 November 1983) is a former professional rugby league footballer who played for the Burleigh Bears in the Queensland Cup and the South Sydney Rabbitohs in the NRL. He also played for the Cook Islands national rugby league team.
