= Internet homicide =

Type of killing in which victim and perpetrator met online

Internet homicide, also called internet assassination, refers to killing in which victim and perpetrator met online, in some cases having known each other previously only through the Internet. Internet killer is also an appellation found in media reports for a person who broadcasts the crime of murder online or who murders a victim met through the Internet. Depending on the venue used, other terms used in the media are Internet chat room killer, Craigslist killer, Facebook serial killer. Internet homicide can also be part of an Internet suicide pact or consensual homicide. Some commentators believe that reports on these homicides have overemphasized their connection to the Internet.

== Serial killers ==
Serial killers are murderers who target three or more victims sequentially with a "cooling off" period between each murder, and whose motivation for killing is largely based on psychological gratification. Such killers have used forms of social networking to attract victims long before the advent of the Internet. For example, between 1900 and 1914, Hungarian serial killer Béla Kiss lured his 24 victims by using personal ads published in newspapers.

According to Paul Bocj, the author of Cyberstalking: Harassment in the Internet Age and How to Protect Your Family, "The idea that a serial killer may have operated via the Internet is, understandably, one that has resulted in a great deal of public anxiety." In Harold Schecter's A to Z Encyclopedia of Serial Killers, the entry for "Internet" reads in part: "If the Internet has become a very useful tool for people interested in serial killers, there's some indication that it may also prove to be a resource for serial killers themselves." Maurice Godwin, a forensic consultant, argued that "There are some sadistic predators that rely on the Mardi Gras Effect ["the ability to hide one's identity on the Internet"] to lure and murder repeatedly." The first serial killer known to have used the Internet to find victims was John Edward Robinson, who was arrested in 2000 and was referred to in Law Enforcement News as the "USA's first Internet serial killer" and "the nation's first documented serial killer to use the Internet as a means of luring victims."

== Venues ==
Online predators, participants in internet suicide and suicide-homicide pacts, and internet killers may seek out victims through internet forums, chat rooms, listservs, email, bulletin boards, social networking sites, online role playing games, online dating services, Yahoo groups, or Usenet.

=== Chat rooms ===
Online chatrooms are sometimes used by killers to meet and bait potential victims. For example, the Japanese serial murderer Hiroshi Maeue is known to have found victims by using online suicide chat rooms. The killer Lisa Marie Montgomery is reported to have met her victim in an online chatroom for Rat Terrier lovers called "Ratter Chatter."

Online chatrooms are also used, in some cases, to plan consensual homicides. For example, in 1996, a Maryland woman, Sharon Lopatka, apparently agreed to be killed by torture and strangulation in a conversation with a man in an online chatroom. Robert Frederick Glass pleaded guilty to killing Lopatka and later died in prison while serving his sentence. In a case that might be regarded as a quasi-consensual homicide, "John," a teenage boy from Altrincham, England, allegedly tricked another teenager into killing him using long conversations in an online chatroom. The other teenager, Mark, apparently believed he was being recruited by a female Secret Service agent. The suicide-by-homicide failed and on May 29, 2004 John pleaded guilty to inciting someone to murder him and was sentenced to three years supervision. Mark pleaded guilty to attempted murder and was sentenced to two years supervision. The boys were forbidden to contact each other.

=== Online advertisements ===
As an article in the New York Daily News explained in 2009, "Long before there was a craigslist or dot-com dating, there were places where men and women who were too shy or busy to meet face to face could find romance. Calling themselves "matrimonial bureaus," these organizations were known mostly as the "lonely hearts clubs," and they flourished through the middle of the 20th century." It was in venues like these—print media such as newspaper classified ads and personal or lonely hearts club ads—that 20th century murderers such as Harry Powers, the so-called "Matrimonial Bureau Murderer," and Harvey Carignan, "the Want Ad Killer" met their victims.

Electronic advertising has gradually replaced printed ads and the Internet is now a venue where murderers who employ a similar modus operandi can meet their victims; in Schecter's Encyclopedia, the entry for "Ads" mentions Internet dating and the use of Internet ads by the so-called "Internet Cannibal" Armin Meiwes. Since 2007, several accused and convicted killers have contacted victims through advertising services such as Craigslist, a popular classified advertising website. These killers are sometimes referred to in the media as "Craigslist killers"; the first use of the term Craigslist killings may date to October 31, 2007, when the phrase appeared in a headline in the Saint Paul Pioneer Press in Minnesota, in reference to the murder of Katherine Olson by Michael John Anderson, who was then dubbed "the Craigslist killer".

Since 2007, several suspected and convicted perpetrators have met their victims or solicited murder through Craigslist. Of those cases, two were convicted for crimes in the three-month period encompassing February to April 2009 and a further four were accused of crimes during the 13-month span of March 2008 through April 2009. Although, by definition, Craigslist will have been the initial contact point and a killing will have taken place in order for the suspected, accused, or convicted perpetrator to be dubbed a Craigslist killer, the actual motivations of these criminals are varied. The victims' deaths may result from a robbery or a sexual encounter that turned violent. Some of these perpetrators may not have intended to commit murder, but killed their victims during the course of a struggle or to prevent capture. Each case is different.

=== Internet dating ===
In 1995, Match.com was launched as the first online dating application. In the following decades internet dating has become the second largest paid Internet industry. However, often people suffering from relatedness frustration will seek affection and care online, but find their needs are not met. The self-esteem enhancement was found to produce problematic usage of internet dating apps due to the sex motive.

According to Michael Largo, the author of Final Exits: The Illustrated Encyclopedia of How We Die, "Internet dating is becoming very popular, but since 1995, there's been[...] over 400 instances where a homicide has been related to the person that [the victim] met online."

== Criticism of the concept ==
Several legal and technology experts have questioned the idea that there is a phenomenon of Internet killings. A legal theorist pressed for an Internet angle on a murder by a journalist related that "I asked her whether, if I called her up and asked her out on a blind date and murdered her, she would think it was a "telephone-related murder"?".

Leslie Harris, CEO of the Center for Democracy and Technology said of the term "Craigslist Killer" that "A great many of the tragic incidents that tangentially involve the Internet have little or nothing to do with the Internet itself. The Craigslist case is the latest example of that phenomenon. Craigslist is an innovative and valuable resource, which frankly, is being unfairly smeared because it is an Internet site." The book Hypercrime argues that "The more one looks, the more these widely circulated instances of 'cyberkilling' appear to vanish into the smoke of a 'cyberspace'."

Susan Brenner, a professor of law and technology wrote that "Is it a cybercrime for John to meet Mary on the Internet, correspond with her and use e-mail to lure her to a meeting where he kills her? News stories often describe conduct such as this as a cybercrime, or as 'Internet murder.' But why is this anything other than murder? We do not, for example, refer to killings orchestrated over the telephone as 'tele-murder' or by snail mail as 'mail murder.' It seems that this is not a cybercrime, that it is simply a real-world crime the commission of which happens to involve the use of computer technology," but she conceded that "there may be reasons to treat conduct such as this differently and to construe it as something other than a conventional crime."

== Notable Internet homicides ==
The following individuals have been arrested and/or convicted of crimes in which police claimed that Internet services such as chat rooms and Craigslist advertisements were used to contact victims or hire a murderer. Despite sharing a similar method of contacting victims, they apparently have varied motivations. In the list below, the victims' deaths may have been premeditated, especially if the perpetrator is a serial killer, but they may also have resulted from a robbery, insurance fraud, or a sexual encounter that turned violent.

- Robert Frederick Glass, a computer analyst from North Carolina, killed Sharon Lopatka by torture and strangulation in a case of apparent consensual homicide on October 16, 1996. Lopatka used the Internet, where she also advertised pornography related to unusual sexual fetishes, to locate Glass, who was later convicted of voluntary manslaughter for the crime.
- In 1998, Chris Dean, a truck driver from Indiana, was sentenced to life imprisonment for the murder of 17-year-old Chris Marquis from Vermont. Marquis operated a scam in which he would pose as the 27-year-old proprietor of a fictional shop called the CB Shack, and offer to trade merchandise with people online. When people sent Marquis their goods, he would either not send anything back or would send something old or broken. Dean fell victim to this, built a pipe bomb and mailed it to Marquis, killing him and injuring his mother.
- The murder of Ofir Rahum was a shooting attack which occurred on 17 January 2001, in which Palestinian militants from the Tanzim faction of Fatah killed 16-year-old Israeli high school student Ofir Rahum on the outskirts of Ramallah. The murder was planned and initiated by a Palestine Liberation Organization collaborator, 24-year-old Mona Jaud Awana from Bir Nabala. Awana conducted long private conversations in English with Rahum on the internet via ICQ, during which she masqueraded as a Jewish Israeli girl. Awana managed to gain Rahum's confidence and to get him to meet with her in Jerusalem, supposedly for romantic purposes. When he arrived for the meeting, she drove him through the border control into the Palestinian-controlled territory and towards a secluded area on the outskirts of Ramallah where Palestinian terrorists shot him at close range, with Awana standing aside and watching. Awana was tried and convicted of murder, and was sentenced to life imprisonment.
- The consensual murder of Bernd Jürgen Brandes by the so-called "Internet cannibal" Armin Meiwes; the two met on a Yahoo Group destined for gay men interested in castration and cannibalism called "Nullo", where people described their fantasies, and where both Meiwes and Brandes openly advertised.
- On December 3, 2002, 13-year-old Kacie Woody was abducted from her Holland, Arkansas home by 47-year-old David Leslie Fuller, who had befriended her in a chat room while posing as a 17-year-old boy named David Leslie Fagen. The following day, law enforcement found the two deceased inside Guardsmart Storage in Conway. Woody's body was inside Fuller's rented minivan, where he had chained her to the van's floor before raping her and shooting her in the head. Fuller, who was sitting in one of the van's removed back seats behind the van, shot himself in the head when law enforcement arrived.
- John Edward Robinson, known in the media as "The Internet Slave Master" and "the first Internet serial killer", met most of his victims in online chat rooms. He was convicted of murdering five women via blunt force trauma to the head.
- Edward Frank Manuel, arrested in January 2003, was dubbed the "Internet suicide chat room killer" by United Press International and other news sources.
- Hiroshi Maeue was known as the "Suicide Website Murderer". According to an article in The Sydney Morning Herald, this killer utilized "suicide websites [as] an aid to murder". Although he posed online as someone who wished to carry out internet suicide pacts, he suffocated his victims to death when they met in person. He was convicted of three counts of murder and sentenced to death in 2007, and was executed by hanging in 2009.
- Garry Francis Newman, a 50-year-old man, was convicted of the murder of 15-year-old Carly Ryan in 2007. He posed as "Brandon", a 20-year-old musician, and began an online relationship through online platforms MySpace and VampireFreaks.com. He eventually lured Carly to a secluded beach in the suburb of Port Elliot, South Australia where he subsequently murdered her. During his arrest, a search of his house revealed a notebook detailing some 200 online personas. In the wake of the arrest and trial of Newman, a nationwide bill, nicknamed "Carly's Law", was introduced to criminalise acts done using a carriage service to prepare or plan to cause harm to, procure, or engage in sexual activity with, a person under the age of 16.
- Thomas Montgomery, a 47-year-old married man, was convicted in 2007 of murdering a workmate in a case called the "Internet Chatroom Murder". He posed as "Tommy", a 21-year-old marine, and began an online relationship with a 17-year-old called Jessi. A workmate of his, 22-year-old Brian Barrett, subsequently began an online relationship with the same girl after Montgomery's deception was revealed, and Montgomery shot him in their work car park. "Jessi" was actually a middle-aged woman who had been using pictures of her daughter. A police officer said of Montgomery: "he became a completely different person online". Another commented that: "It's very odd that someone would take another's life over jealousy of a person you've never laid your eyes on". A documentary about this case titled Talhotblond (Jessi's screen name) was released in 2009.
- Michael John Anderson was convicted of murdering Katherine Olson in Minnesota in October 2007. According to an article in the St. Paul Pioneer Press, "The 19-year-old Savage man used Craigslist to lure Katherine Ann Olson to his home for a fictitious baby-sitting job, then shot her in the back."
- Bernard George Lamp, a 51-year-old resident of Troutman, North Carolina was charged with murder and first-degree kidnapping on March 22, 2008 in the death of a woman from Cornelius, North Carolina; according to news reports, she had "agreed to meet the man accused of killing her after encountering him on Craigslist."
- Ann Marie Linscott, a 49-year-old Michigan woman, was arrested in January 2008 for soliciting murder on Craigslist, where she offered $5,000 "for someone willing to kill the unsuspecting wife of a man she'd begun an affair with online"; in February 2009, she was found guilty of attempted murder-for-hire and sentenced to 12 years and seven months in prison.
- Christian Grotheer, known as "Germany's First Internet Killer," confessed to two murders in 2009. According to an article in The Daily Telegraph, he admitted to "murdering women he met in online chat rooms."
- David Heiss, a 21-year-old German office worker, became infatuated with a British girl, Joanna Witton, 20, who along with her boyfriend Matthew Pyke, 20, was an administrator of the Advance Wars series fansite, Wars Central. After his advances were rebuffed, including two visits, Heiss traveled to the UK once more and stabbed Matthew Pyke to death. He was jailed for life in May 2009. A police spokesman noted that, "While this is an extremely unusual case, one thing is clear and that is that Heiss used the internet to harass and stalk Joanna and Matthew. He eventually found out where they lived and other information about them that enabled him to carry out his plans. We should all consider the amounts of personal information we share on web systems like MSN and on internet forums."
- John Katehis, a teenager, was arrested and indicted for the murder of ABC radio news reporter George Weber in New York in March 2009. The two had met through Craigslist, and journals such as The Advocate called the suspect an "Alleged Craigslist Killer".
- Korena Roberts was arrested in June 2009 for allegedly killing 21-year-old Heather Snively—who was eight-months pregnant—and her fetus, by cutting open her abdomen. They were reported to have met on through an advertisement by Roberts on Craigslist for the sale of baby clothes.
- In 2009, Anthony Powell, a 28-year-old student at the Henry Ford Community College in Detroit, shot and killed fellow student, 20-year-old Asia McGowan, before fatally shooting himself. Powell had a history of mental illness and used his YouTube account to make hate videos against black women and atheists. McGowan also had an account at YouTube. Powell became obsessed with McGowan through her account, and began stalking her on both YouTube and Facebook. He had decided that black women like McGowan were naturally promiscuous, and had made videos with titles such as "Black Women Don't Deserve Respect", shortly before killing McGowan. Many of Powell's videos were so concerning that numerous YouTube users contacted the Detroit police about them.
- Philip Markoff, known as "The Craigslist killer" in numerous news reports, was arrested and indicted in April 2009 for the murder of Julissa Brisman and for other attacks against women that occurred in Massachusetts and Rhode Island; he had met the women through their online advertisements in Craigslist, where they had advertised erotic services. Markoff committed suicide in his jail cell on August 15, 2010, several months prior to the scheduled trial.
- 20-year-old Richard Samuel McCrosky from California began an online relationship with 16-year-old Emma Niederbrock from Farmville, Virginia. In September 2009, while visiting Emma and her family in Virginia, McCrosky attacked and murdered Emma, as well as her parents, Debra S. Kelly and Mark Niederbrock, and Emma’s friend Melanie Wells at the Niederbrock home. He was arrested, convicted of the murders and sentenced to life in prison.
- David Russell, a UK McDonald's worker, impersonated Bring Me The Horizon singer Oliver Sykes to seduce a California woman he met on Facebook before slitting her throat and repeatedly stabbing her. Russell, 20, has been jailed for life after admitting to the kidnap and attempted murder of Maricar Benedicto, 19, whom he met online in 2010.
- Zhou Youping, a karaoke singer from Changsha, China, was arrested in November 2009 for the murder of 6 men he had met on a BDSM and erotic asphyxiation-related website. Zhou arranged to meet his victims for sex at various hotels and guesthouses around Changsha, where he reportedly hanged them during sado-masochistic sex games. He was convicted on all six counts of murder and sentenced to death in 2011, and was executed in 2014.
- In 2010, 21-year-old Tiara Nichelle Pool first met a man named David Kelsey Sparre through Craigslist, and after a sexual encounter between them, Sparre murdered Pool by stabbing her approximately 89 times, and he also stole some of her items. Sparre was found guilty of first-degree murder and sentenced to death on March 30, 2012.
- In 2010, Peter Avsenew posted a sexually suggestive ad on Craigslist, offering his services to an older male couple, and his offer was accepted by 47-year-old Kevin Mark Powell and 52-year-old Stephen Duane Adams, who were both in a relationship for almost 30 years. Avsenew was taken into the couple's home, where he stayed for weeks before he bludgeoned and fatally shot the victims. Avsenew was found guilty of first-degree murder and sentenced to death.
- In 2013, Richard Beasley, a 53-year-old from Summit County, Ohio, was convicted and sentenced to death for luring three men to their deaths using a Craigslist ad for a non-existent job in 2011. Beasley was convicted in March of kidnapping and killing David Pauley, 51, of Norfolk, Virginia; Ralph Geiger, 56, of Akron, Ohio, and Timothy Kern, 47, of Massillon, Ohio. He was also convicted of the attempted murder of Scott Davis, 49, a Woodruff, South Carolina man who answered the ad and was shot in the arm while escaping after meeting Beasley and his 16 year old accomplice, Brogan Rafferty.
- In 2013, newlywed couple Miranda and Elytte Barbour were arrested and charged with the murder of Troy LaFerrara. The Barbours allegedly met LaFerrara after he answered the couple's Craigslist ad offering "companionship" and conversation in exchange for payment.
- In February 2014, Breck Bednar, a 14-year-old boy from Redhill, Surrey, was murdered by Lewis Daynes, an 18-year-old unemployed software engineer who groomed him online on a gaming site. Bednar was found dead in Daynes' flat in Grays, Essex, and had been sexually assaulted and stabbed multiple times. Daynes also sent pictures of Bednar's corpse to mutual friends. Lewis Daynes was subsequently sentenced to life imprisonment with a minimum of 25 years.
- In February 2015, attorney David Messerschmitt was murdered in a hotel room in Washington, D.C. According to police records, he had posted a listing on Craigslist requesting a sexual encounter, but was answered by two women who planned to rob him. The suspect, 21-year-old Jamyra Gallmon, was convicted of second-degree murder and sentenced to 24 years in prison. Gallmon's accomplice, 19-year-old Dominique Johnson, pled guilty to conspiracy to commit robbery and was sentenced to one year in prison.
- Takahiro Shiraishi, dubbed the "Twitter killer" in the media, murdered and dismembered 9 people, mostly young women and girls, at his apartment in Zama, Kanagawa prefecture, between August and October 2017. He reportedly used Twitter to lure his victims to his home, under the guise of helping them commit suicide. In 2020, he pleaded guilty to nine counts of murder and was sentenced to death. He was executed by hanging in 2025.

== See also ==
- Assisted suicide
- Computer crime
- Consensual homicide
- Internet suicide pact
- Lonely hearts killer (or want-ad killer)
- Online predator
- Red Room Curse
