= Killing of Sharon Lopatka =

1996 manslaughter in Hampstead, Maryland

- Location: Hampstead, Maryland, U.S.
- Date: October 16, 1996; 30 years ago
- Attack type: Homicide by ligature strangulation, manslaughter, torture killing
- Victim: Sharon Rina Lopatka
- Perpetrator: Robert "Bobby" Frederick Glass
- Motive: Mutual sexual gratification
- Charges: First-degree murder (dropped)
- Verdict: Pleaded guilty
- Convictions: Voluntary manslaughter
- Sentence: 3 to 4 5/12 years in prison

Sharon Rina Lopatka (née Denburg; September 20, 1961 – October 16, 1996) was an Internet entrepreneur in Hampstead, Maryland, United States, who was killed in a case of apparent consensual homicide. Lopatka was tortured and strangled to death on October 16, 1996, by Robert "Bobby" Frederick Glass, a computer analyst from North Carolina. The apparent purpose was mutual sexual gratification.

The case was reportedly the first in which a police department arrested a murder suspect with evidence gathered primarily from email messages. While Lopatka and Glass had initially planned a consensual homicide, Glass maintained that the death was an accident, which was corroborated by Lopatka's autopsy. However, police contended that the death was intentional. Glass pled guilty to voluntary manslaughter and was sentenced to serve 36–53 months in state prison, as well as 27 months in federal prison for unrelated charges of possession of child sexual exploitation material, to be served consecutively. He died before his scheduled release from state prison.

== Background ==
Sharon Rina Denburg was the first of four daughters born to Orthodox Jewish parents Mr. and Mrs. Abraham J. Denburg. They were members of the Beth Tfiloh Congregation, Abraham being a cantor at the synagogue. Raised in Baltimore, Maryland, Sharon was allegedly considered by her classmates "as normal as you can get", wrote The News & Observer, and was a part of sport teams and her school's choir club. Graduating from Pikesville High School in 1979, Lopatka married construction worker Victor Lopatka in Ellicott City, Maryland, in 1991, and relocated with him to a ranch-esque tract house in Hampstead, Maryland, during the early 1990s. The marriage was described by a classmate of Lopatka as a "way of breaking away", and her parents did not approve of it.

In 1995, Lopatka started doing online advertising businesses from her Ellicott City home in order to make additional money. The first website she hosted, "House of Dion", sold home décor guides by mail for seven dollars each. An advertisement on the website read, "Home decorating secrets seen in the posh homes from the New England states to the Hollywood homes can now be yours. Never published before! Quick easy ways to decorate your home."

She was paid $50 per advertisement rewriting ad copy; her business was titled "Classified Concepts". She managed several websites for distributing psychic readings, also garnering a percentage of the money from sales of other services with premium-rate telephone numbers advertised on her websites.

In addition to her advertising and psychic reading business, Lopatka marketed pornographic content, using the alias Nancy Carlson, which depicted women who were unconscious from being drugged, hypnotized or chloroformed engaging in sex acts with each other. She sold her undergarments, an advertisement for them reading, "Is there anyone out there interested in buying my worn panties..." She also used the Internet to fulfill her own unusual sexual desires. Lopatka used other pseudonyms and personas when using pornographic chat rooms on sites like fetishfeet.com and sexbondage.com. More than 50 messages discussing her sexual desire to be tortured to death were discovered by The News & Observer. Lopatka's character of Carlson, who was a disciplinarian dominatrix pornographic movie actress who weighed 300 pounds, was one of the pseudonyms she used for these chats. This alarmed a sex workers' rights activist named Tanith who tried to stop Lopatka's behavior. Lopatka replied to Tanith that "I want the real thing. I did not ask for you preaching to me."

Robert "Bobby" Frederick Glass worked as a computer analyst for the government of Catawba County, North Carolina, for nearly 16 years. His tasks included programming tax rolls and tracking vehicle gas consumption rates in the county. For 14 years until May 1996, Glass was married to his wife Sherri, and the couple had two daughters and one son. Sherri logged on to Glass's email account and found several "raw, violent and disturbing" messages that he sent using the pseudonyms Toyman and Slowhand. As a result, the two separated. Lopatka first met Glass in August 1996 while in a pornographic chat room. Through email, Lopatka presented Glass her fetish of being tortured, and he responded with messages about how he would fulfill her fantasy. Police discovered close to 900 pages of emails between the two during the investigation of Lopatka's death.

== Killing and investigation ==
On the morning of October 13, 1996, Lopatka informed her husband, Victor, that she was going to Georgia to meet acquaintances. She also left him a note, which said that she would not return home and requested him not to track down Glass. The note also read, "If my body is never retrieved, don't worry: know that I'm at peace." That morning, Lopatka drove 45 minutes to Baltimore's Pennsylvania Station and arrived on an Amtrak train in Charlotte, North Carolina, by 8:45 p.m. Glass drove with Lopatka in his pickup truck to his mobile home in rural Lenoir, North Carolina, 80 miles (130 km) from Charlotte.

Lopatka's husband found the note his wife left and notified police, who found six weeks of email conversations between Lopatka and Glass. In her email correspondence with Glass, Lopatka explicitly asked him to torture her to death.

Glass, interviewed later during his imprisonment, admitted to fulfilling Lopatka's torture fantasy but also said that the death was an accident. As he recalled, "I don't know how much I pulled the rope. ... I never wanted to kill her, but she ended up dead." This was corroborated by the autopsy performed by John Butts, the chief state medical examiner of North Carolina, who stated that Lopatka was accidentally strangled to death three days after her arrival in North Carolina. However, the police disagreed: their search warrant affidavits described the death as intentional, which they claimed was proved by emails.

North Carolina police staked out Glass's home for several days but did not see Lopatka. On October 25, 1996, Judge Beverly T. Beal issued a search warrant on the home; inside the house, investigators discovered items belonging to Lopatka. In addition, they found drug and bondage equipment, a .357 Magnum handgun, and pornographic magazines. They also found trash and toys outside the trailer. A police officer then noticed a mound of soil 75 feet (23 m) from the home before finding body parts buried 2.5 feet (0.76 m) below. Glass was arrested at work after this discovery, charged with first-degree murder, and held without bond in the Caldwell County Jail. He also faced additional state and federal charges for possessing child sexual exploitation material found on his computer. County investigator D. A. Brown said that Lopatka's body might never have been found had it been buried in the woods behind Glass's house.

Glass pleaded guilty to voluntary manslaughter and sexual exploitation charges on January 27, 2000, and was sentenced to 36–53 months in the Avery-Mitchell Correctional Institution. He was also sentenced to an additional 27 months for federal charges of second-degree minor exploitation, to be served consecutively.

Glass was found dead of a heart attack in prison on February 20, 2002, at the age of 51, one month before he was to finish his state sentence and begin his federal sentence.

== Influence ==
The Lopatka case was reportedly the first in which a murder suspect was put in custody by a police department mainly because of evidence from emails. Most of the media coverage of Lopatka's killing mainly emphasized the potentially dangerous consequences of Internet meetings. Some called for restrictions on anonymous internet forums to better protect people from killings like Lopatka's, while anti-censorship activists argued that pseudonyms allowed people to express controversial beliefs in an open forum. Writers have labeled the situation one of the earliest examples of what psychologists called the Mardi Gras phenomenon, where one uses various personalities to decrease chances of consequences for his or her actions. Because of the case's popularity, a number of psychologists developed a greater interest in atypical sexual desires, such as sadism, masochism, and asphyxia.

== Cultural references ==
The case inspired the film Downloading Nancy (2008), which premiered at the 2008 Sundance Film Festival and had a wider release in 2009. Interviews with screenwriter Lee Ross indicate he was aware of the Lopatka case and found it "dark, horrible ... and intriguing".

== See also ==
- Autassassinophilia
- Crime in Maryland
- Crime in North Carolina
- Suicide and the Internet
- Internet homicide
- Armin Meiwes
- Murder of Sonia Exelby

== Bibliography ==
- Bell, Rachael. "A Date with Death". Crime Library. Archived from the original on April 6, 2003.
