= Consensual homicide =

Homicide with the consent of the person being killed

A consensual homicide is the killing of one person by another, with the consent of the person being killed.

== Assisted suicide ==
The most common form of consensual homicide is assisted suicide, most commonly as euthanasia, in which terminally ill people seek assistance from their physicians (or family members) to alleviate their suffering by ending their lives. This practice is legal in some jurisdictions, but remains controversial because of the legal, ethical and practical issues it raises.

== Exceptional cases ==
Suspected serial killer John Bodkin Adams claimed that his patient Edith Alice Morrell—for whose murder he was tried in 1957—had wanted to die. He was controversially found not guilty, but was later suspected of having murdered up to 163 of his patients.

In 1996 a Maryland entrepreneur named Sharon Lopatka arranged for her own torture and strangulation over the Internet.

In 2001, Armin Meiwes, a citizen of Rotenburg, Germany, murdered and cannibalized Bernd Brandes, a willing victim whom he had met via the Internet. This case attracted considerable attention from the German media: beyond sexual details, the case became known for the unique legal challenges it presented, including difficulties determining the parties involved, the fact that the victim had given consent to their death, and the difference between consensual homicide and suicide. Meiwes was initially convicted of manslaughter and sentenced to eight years and six months in prison; in a retrial, he was convicted of murder and sentenced to life imprisonment.

In 2005, in Japan, Hiroshi Maeue lured three persons using the Internet, with promises to assist in their suicides, and strangled them. They may have consented to their killings at first, but the method was different from his promise of death by carbon monoxide poisoning. Maeue had previous convictions and his motivation was clearly sexual. He was regarded as a serial killer and was sentenced to death.

In January 2025, Đoàn Văn Sáng's killing of Nguyễn Xuân Đạt in Lạng Sơn province of Vietnam was in a situation similar to the case of Bernd Brandes, mainly in terms of both parties' sexual desires. Đạt's murder, which was recorded and later sold for monetary gain for Đoàn Văn Sáng, is described as the first known case of a genuine snuff film.

A British woman named Sonia Exelby was stabbed to death in Reddick, Florida in October 2025 by Dwain Hall, a man she had met online. Exelby and Hall had exchanged a number of messages over the past two years discussing Exelby's suicidal fantasies of being tortured and murdered, eventually arranging to meet up in the United States so that Hall could kill Exelby for sexual gratification.

== Other types ==
- Seppuku, the traditional Japanese method of ritual suicide, was, in many cases, carried out as consensual homicide. After the samurai slices into his own stomach with a sword, his assistant, the kaishakunin, is tasked with immediately carrying out a mercy kill—typically by beheading—as, without the assistant's presence, the process would be extremely painful and drawn out. In later times, forced seppuku was effectively used as a method of execution.

== See also ==
- Sadomasochism
- Snuff film
- Suicide by cop
