= Takahiro Shiraishi =

Japanese serial killer and sex offender (1990–2025)

- 白石隆浩
- Shiraishi in an undated image
- Born: 9 October 1990; Machida, Tokyo, Japan
- Died: 27 June 2025 (aged 34); Tokyo Detention House, Tokyo, Japan
- Cause of death: Execution by hanging
- Other names: Twitter Killer; Zama Suicide Pact Killer
- Status: Executed
- Motive: Rape, robbery (female victims); Witness elimination (Nishinaka)
- Conviction: Aggravated murder (9 counts)
- Penalty: Death

Details
- Victims: 9
- Span of crimes: 22 August – 17 October 2017
- Country: Japan
- Location: Zama, Kanagawa
- Date apprehended: 31 October 2017

Takahiro Shiraishi (白石隆浩, Shiraishi Takahiro; 9 October 1990 – 27 June 2025) was a Japanese serial killer and sex offender. He was also known as the Twitter Killer or the Zama Suicide Pact Killer, which he was labeled as in most media reports at the time of his sentencing. His modus operandi consisted of tracking and meeting suicidal women, encouraging their thoughts and then killing them. In Zama, Kanagawa, between August and October 2017, he murdered nine people, eight of them being young women, including three high-school girls, in an incident known as the Zama Nine Murders. (Note: Various names: Zama 9 Murders Zama Nine Bodies Incident Zama Apartment Nine Bodies Incident Zama Incident)

== Background ==
Shiraishi was born in Tokyo on 9 October 1990. He worked as a scout who lured women into brothels to work in the sex industry in Kabukichō, Tokyo's biggest red-light district. People warned locals about him, describing him as a "creepy scout". Shiraishi moved to an apartment in Zama in August 2017.

On the social media platform Twitter, Shiraishi invited suicidal people to his home, where he offered to either help them die or watch them kill themselves. A friend indicated that Shiraishi had played choking games with schoolfriends, and signs of his later victims indicated that they had been strangled.

== Investigations and arrest ==
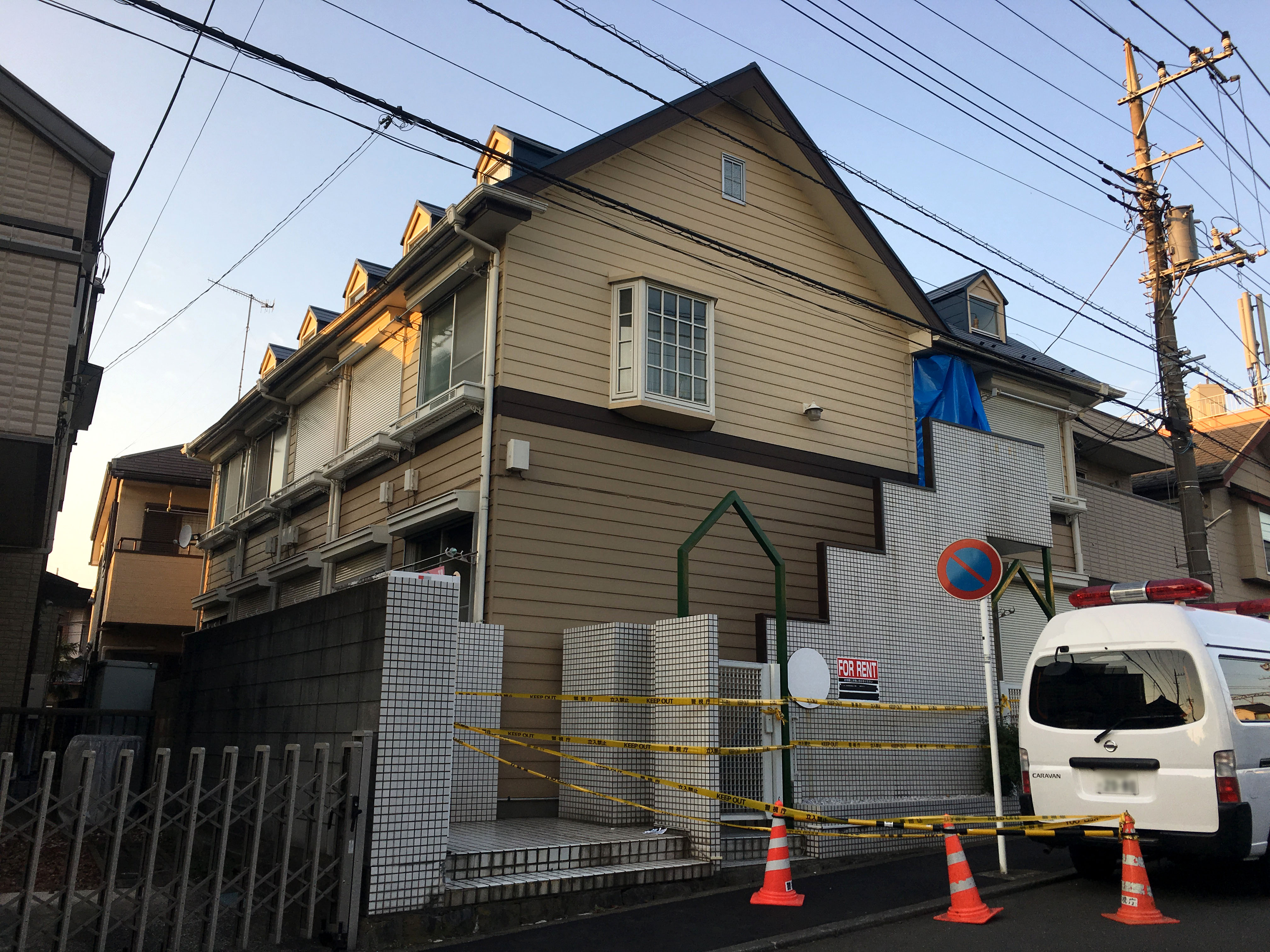
The apartment complex where the bodies were found

On October 24, one of the missing women's brothers started an investigation with police to find his sister. A woman known only as "Yumi" assisted him by contacting Shiraishi and setting up a fake appointment. They both involved the police.

The police arrived at the apartment and asked where the missing woman was. Shiraishi indicated she was in the freezer, and police found nine dismembered bodies in the house. In three cooler boxes and five large storage boxes, police found heads, legs, and arms. Neighbors corroborated the events by confirming that foul smells of rotting flesh had come from the house. Shiraishi had discarded elements of the people into his bin, which had been taken away in the recycled garbage. The nine victims were eight women and one man, all of whom were between the ages of 15 and 26.

The police investigation confirmed the missing woman had been walking with Shiraishi on 23 October 2017. Shiraishi confessed to killing and dismembering the nine people. Most of the victims were suicidal women whom he had lured on social media – in some cases, offering to help them die, and in others, proposing to commit suicide together with them. Before he committed the murders, Shiraishi had told his father his life had no meaning. Shiraishi claimed his motive was sex and financial gain; he raped and robbed his female victims. He killed his only male victim because he was searching for one of the women Shiraishi had killed.

== Victims ==
- Mizuki Miura, 21
- Kureha Ishihara, 15
- Shogo Nishinaka, 20
- Hinako Sarashina, 19
- Hitomi Fujima, 26
- Akari Suda, 17
- Natsumi Kubo, 17
- Kazumi Maruyama, 25
- Aiko Tamura, 23

== Trial and execution ==
Shiraishi's lawyers had intended to base their defence on the fact that Shiraishi had obtained the consent of most of his victims to kill them. However, contrary to the plans of his defence team, Shiraishi pleaded guilty to nine murders on 1 October 2020. On 15 December 2020, he was sentenced to death. He indicated he would not appeal his sentence. Shiraishi's death sentence was finalized in January 2021, and he was executed by hanging on 27 June 2025.

== See also ==
- Capital punishment in Japan
- List of people executed in Japan
- List of serial killers by country
- Hiroshi Maeue
- Volunteer (capital punishment)
