= Snuff film =

Film showing real murders

A snuff film, snuff movie, or snuff video is a type of film, oftentimes defined as being produced for profit or financial gain, that shows scenes of actual homicide committed or orchestrated by the filmmakers.

The concept of snuff films became known to the general public during the 1970s, when an urban legend alleged that a clandestine industry was producing such films for profit. The rumor was amplified in 1976 by the release of a film called Snuff, which capitalized on the legend through a disingenuous marketing campaign. However, that film, like others on the topic, relied on special effects to simulate murder. The existence of a snuff movie industry has never been proven: horror film magazine Fangoria later described the very concept as a "myth" and "a scare tactic, dreamt up by the media to terrify the public."

In 2025, Vice published an article documenting what they described as the first actual snuff video, known as The Vietnamese Butcher, depicting the killing of a willing participant. Video clips and images from this murder have been sold since February 2025 on the dark web and through Telegram channels.

== Definitions ==
A snuff film is a movie in a purported genre of films in which a person is actually murdered, though some variations of the definition may include films that show people dying by suicide. According to existing definitions, snuff films can be pornographic and are made for financial gain but are supposedly "circulated amongst a jaded few for the purpose of entertainment". The Collins English Dictionary defines a "snuff movie" as "a pornographic film in which an unsuspecting actress or actor is murdered at the climax of the film"; the Cambridge Dictionary defines it more broadly as "a violent film that shows a real murder".

Fangoria defined snuff movies as "films in which a person is killed on camera. The death is premeditated, with the purpose of being filmed in order to make money. Often times, there is a sexual aspect to the murder, either on film (as in, a porn scene that ends horribly) or that the final project is used for sexual gratification." Films featuring deaths that are authentic but accidental "are not considered snuff because the deaths were not planned. Other death on video, such as terrorists beheading victims, are done to fulfill an ideology, not to earn money."

Some filmed records of executions and deaths in war exist, but in those cases the death was not specifically staged for financial gain or entertainment. There have been a number of "amateur-made" snuff films available on the Internet. However, such videos are produced by the murderers to make an impact on an audience or for their own satisfaction, and not for financial profit. Some specialized websites show videos of actual killings for profit, as their shock value will attract an audience; but these websites are not operated by the perpetrators of the murders.

According to Snopes, the idea of an actual snuff film "industry" clandestinely producing such "entertainment" for monetary gain is preposterous because "capturing a murder on film would be foolhardy at best. Only the most deranged would consider preserving for a jury a perfect video record of a crime they could go to the executioner for. Even if the murderer stays completely out of the camera's way, too much of who the killer is, how the murder was carried out, and where it took place would be part of such a film, and these details would quickly lead police to the right door. Though someone whose mania has caused them to lose touch with reality might skip over this point, those who are supposedly in the business for the money would be all too aware of this. It doesn't make sense to flirt with the electric chair for the profits derived from a video."

== History of the concept ==
=== Origins of the urban legend ===
The noun snuff originally meant the part of a candle wick that has already burned; the verb snuff meant to cut this off, and by extension to extinguish or kill. The word has been used in this sense in English slang for hundreds of years. It was defined in 1874 as a "term very common among the lower orders of London, meaning to die from disease or accident".

Film studies professor Boaz Hagin argues that the concept of films showing actual murders originated decades earlier than is commonly believed, at least as early as 1907. That year, Polish-French writer Guillaume Apollinaire published the short story A Good Film about newsreel photojournalists who stage and film a murder due to public fascination with crime news; in the story, the public believes the murder is real but police determine that the crime was faked. Hagin also proposes that the film Network (1976) contains an explicit (fictional) snuff film depiction when television news executives orchestrate the on-air murder of a news anchor to boost ratings.

Stuntman Ormer Locklear and his copilot died in an airplane crash that was included in the final print of the 1920 film The Skywayman. The deaths were used to promote the film.

According to film critic Geoffrey O'Brien, "whether or not commercially distributed 'snuff' movies actually exist, the possibility of such movies is implicit in the stock B-movie motif of the mad artist killing his models, as in A Bucket of Blood (1959), Color Me Blood Red (1965), or Decoy for Terror (1967) also known as Playgirl Killer." Likewise, the protagonist of Peeping Tom (1960) films the murders he commits, though he does so as part of his mania and not for financial gain: a 1979 article in The New York Times described the character's activity as making "private 'snuff' films".

The first known use of the term snuff movie is in a 1971 book by Ed Sanders, The Family: The Story of Charles Manson's Dune Buggy Attack Battalion. This book included the interview of an anonymous one-time member of Charles Manson's "Family", who claimed that the group once made such a film in California, by recording the murder of a woman. However, the interviewee later added that he had not watched the film himself and had just heard rumors of its existence. In later editions of the book, Sanders clarified that no films depicting real murders or murder victims had been found.

During the first half of the 1970s, urban legends started to allege that snuff films were being produced in South America for commercial gain, and circulated clandestinely in the United States.

=== Snuff controversy (1976) ===
The idea of movies showing actual murders for profit became more widely known in 1976 with the release of the exploitation film Snuff. This low-budget horror film, loosely based on the Manson murders and originally titled Slaughter, was shot in Argentina by Michael and Roberta Findlay. The film's distribution rights were bought by Allan Shackleton, who eventually found the picture unfit for release and shelved it. Several years later, Shackleton read about snuff films being imported from South America and decided to cash in on the rumor as an attempt to recoup his investment in Slaughter.

Shackleton retitled Slaughter to Snuff and released it with a new ending that purported to depict an actual murder committed on a film set. Snuff's promotional material suggested, without stating outright, that the film featured the real murder of a woman, which amounted to false advertising. The slogan read: "The film that could only be made in South America... where life is CHEAP". Shackleton put out false newspaper clippings that reported a citizens group's crusading against the film, and hired people to act as protesters to picket screenings.

Shackleton's efforts succeeded in generating a media frenzy about the film: real feminist and citizens groups eventually started protesting the movie and picketing theaters. As a result, New York District Attorney Robert M. Morgenthau investigated the picture, establishing that it was a hoax. The controversy nevertheless made the film financially profitable.

=== Rumors related to serial killers and other controversies ===
In subsequent years, more urban legends emerged about snuff movies. Notably, multiple serial killers were rumored to have produced snuff films: however, no such videos were proven to exist. Henry Lee Lucas and his accomplice Ottis Toole claimed to have filmed their crimes, but both men were "pathological liars" and the purported films were never found. Charles Ng and Leonard Lake videotaped their interactions with some of their future victims, but not the murders. Lawrence Bittaker and Roy Norris made an audio recording of their encounter with one victim, though not of her death. Likewise, Paul Bernardo and Karla Homolka made videos of Bernardo sexually abusing two victims, but did not film the murders. In all those cases, the recordings were not intended for public consumption and were used as evidence during the murderers' trials.

Over the years, several films were suspected of being "snuff movies", though none of these accusations turned out to be true. A similar controversy concerned the filming of the video for the 1989 song "Down in It" by Nine Inch Nails, in which Trent Reznor acted in a scene which ended with the implication that Reznor's character had fallen off a building and died. To film the scene, a camera was tied to a balloon with ropes. Minutes after filming started, the ropes snapped and the balloons and camera flew away, eventually landing on a farmer's field in Michigan. The farmer later handed it to the FBI, who began investigating whether the footage was a snuff film portraying a person committing suicide. The FBI identified Reznor and the investigation ended when it was confirmed that Reznor was alive and the footage was not related to crime.

Around 2018, a conspiracy theory called "Frazzledrip" and related to Pizzagate and QAnon, purported the existence of a snuff video where Hillary Clinton and her aide Huma Abedin murdered a young girl as part of a Satanic ritual.

=== Internet age ===
The advent of the Internet, by allowing anyone to broadcast self-made videos to an international audience, also changed the means of production of films that may be categorized as "snuff". There have been several cases of murders being filmed by their perpetrators and later finding their way online. These include videos made by Mexican cartels or jihadist groups, at least one of the videos shot by the Dnepropetrovsk maniacs in mid-2000s Ukraine, the video shot by Luka Magnotta from Montreal in 2012, the video shot by Vester Lee Flanagan II in 2015, as well as cases of livestreamed murders, including videos made by mass shooters.

Author Steve Lillebuen, who wrote a book on the Magnotta case, commented that social media had created a new trend in crime where killers who crave an audience can become "online broadcasters" by showing their crimes to the world.

Fangoria commented that Magnotta's 2012 video, which showed him mutilating the corpse of his victim, was the closest thing in existence to an actual snuff movie, especially as Magnotta had done some crude editing and used a song as a soundtrack, which amounted to minimal production values. However, it did not show the murder itself and was originally published to attract attention and not for monetary gain. The charges of which Magnotta was found guilty included "publishing obscene materials". In 2016, the owner of Bestgore.com, the website that originally hosted Magnotta's video, pleaded guilty to an obscenity charge and was sentenced to a six-month conditional sentence, half of which was served under house arrest.

In 2025, it was reported members of the Russian mercenary Wagner Group were sharing graphic videos of war crimes via Telegram, sometimes even behind paywalls, prompting calls for an ICC investigation. A confidential legal brief submitted to the International Criminal Court (ICC) by legal experts at UC Berkeley asserts Wagner has been distributing highly graphic videos—involving mutilation, torture, and even scenes implying cannibalism—on Telegram channels tied to their network. These videos were shared explicitly to terrorize civilians and dehumanize victims in Mali, Burkina Faso, and Niger. The Telegram channel White Uncles in Africa, believed to be managed by current or former Wagner operatives, has reposted such content. Experts argue that even sharing these videos may itself be a war crime, constituting a violation of human dignity under the Rome Statute.

On July 7, 2025, the Israeli state arms manufacturer and exporter Rafael Advanced Defense Systems made a social media posting on X that promoted their Spike Firefly miniature loitering munition using a video of an attack on a lone man who was walking out in the open in the middle of a street.

=== The Vietnamese Butcher ===
In late July 2025, graphic video and screenshot compilations of what became colloquially known as "The Vietnamese Butcher" began circulating on Telegram and other encrypted messaging apps. It was eventually leaked to the public through shock sites and other platforms with an extended version, bringing into the light what is described by Vice as potentially the first authentic snuff film.

The video itself involved a willing male participant, who was depicted masturbating before being beheaded with a meat cleaver by a man wearing a plastic Guy Fawkes mask. A montage shows body parts stacked up, intestines separated, followed by images of some kind of food containing an unidentified meat. 11 video clips and 98 images of the event were made available on the dark web and on Telegram to buy as a pack since at least February 2025. Videos and images of the film were also shared around various social media apps and shock sites. Vice's report suggested that the victim may have been aware of the intention to monetize the film, and also encouraged it.

The victim was eventually identified as Nguyễn Xuân Đạt (10 March 1989 – 25 January 2025), a Vietnamese man who had multiple Facebook accounts expressing his sexual desire of being beheaded. Internet users tried to find information on the killer. Other similar footage, with images of Asian men being graphically murdered, later surfaced on Baidu Tieba, a Chinese messaging app often used for criminal activities.

In late November 2025, Internet users traced the leaked information to a suspect, eventually leading to a police investigation at an alleged crime scene inside a market surveillance workplace in Lạng Sơn province. On 3 December 2025, the Ministry of Public Security and Lạng Sơn provincial police released information that the suspect had been identified as a 57-year-old civil service worker named Đoàn Văn Sáng, and arrested under the charge of murder.

== In fiction ==
Since the concept became familiar to the general public, snuff films being made for profit or entertainment have been used as a core plot element or at least mentioned in numerous works of fiction, including the 1979 films Hardcore and Bloodline, and Bret Easton Ellis's 1985 novel Less than Zero. The 1991 novel The Brave by Gregory Mcdonald and its 1997 film adaptation tell the story of a destitute man who agrees to "star" as the victim in a snuff film so he can provide for his family. The novel A Dance at the Slaughterhouse (1991) by Lawrence Block shows private investigator Matthew Scudder discovering what appears to be a snuff film and looking into its origins.

The making or discovery of one or several snuff films is the premise of various horror, thriller or crime films, such as Last House on Dead End Street (1977), Videodrome (1983), Special Effects (1984), Strange Days (1995), Tesis (1996), 8mm (1999), Vacancy (2007), Snuff 102 (2007), A Serbian Film (2010), Sinister (2012), The Counselor (2013), Luther: The Fallen Sun (2023), and the episode "The Devil of Christmas" (2016) in the black comedy series Inside No. 9. The 2003 video game Manhunt sees the main character being forced to participate in a series of snuff films to guarantee his freedom. The 2005 video game Grand Theft Auto: Liberty City Stories features a mission titled "Snuff", where the main character kills a few gangsters while unknowingly being filmed for a snuff movie by a third party, which may be a reference to Manhunt. Also, pretend snuff porn is sometimes filmed as a fetish.

Several horror films such as Cannibal Holocaust (1980) and August Underground (2001) have depicted "snuff movie" situations, coupled with found footage aesthetics used as a narrative device. Though some of these films have generated controversy as to their nature and content, none were, nor have officially purported to be, actual snuff movies.

=== False snuff films ===
==== Faces of Death ====
The 1978 mondo film Faces of Death, which spawned several sequels, is one of the films most commonly associated with the "snuff movie" concept, even though it was not produced by murderers nor clandestinely distributed. Purporting to be an educational film about death, it mixed footage of actual deadly accidents, suicides, autopsies, or executions, with "outright fake scenes" obtained with the help of special effects.

==== The Guinea Pig films ====
The first two films in the Japanese Guinea Pig horror film series, Guinea Pig: Devil's Experiment and Guinea Pig 2: Flower of Flesh and Blood (both released in 1985) are designed to look like snuff films; the video is grainy and unsteady, as if recorded by amateurs, and extensive practical and special effects are used to imitate such features as internal organs and graphic wounds. It was later alleged that Flower of Flesh and Blood had been an inspiration for Japanese serial killer Tsutomu Miyazaki, who murdered several preschool girls in the late 1980s. However, Miyazaki apparently owned a copy of another film in the series and not of that specific one.

In 1991, actor Charlie Sheen became convinced that Flower of Flesh and Blood depicted an actual homicide and contacted the FBI. The FBI initiated an investigation but closed it after the series' producers released a "making of" film demonstrating the special effects used to simulate the murders.

==== Cannibal Holocaust ====
The Italian horror film Cannibal Holocaust (1980), which depicts various atrocities recorded and in some cases committed by a fictional documentary crew, caused director Ruggero Deodato and the producers to be charged for obscenity in Italy. During the film's release in France, a magazine suggested that some of the deaths depicted in the film were real. While rumors later alleged that the director was at some point formally charged with murder, there is no evidence that this was the case. Deodato said that he was actually suspected by the Italian judiciary, but was able to clear himself by asking cast members to appear in court.

Other than graphic gore, the film contains several scenes of sexual violence and the genuine deaths of six animals onscreen and one off screen, issues which find Cannibal Holocaust in the midst of controversy to this day. It has also been claimed that Cannibal Holocaust is banned in over 50 countries, although this has never been verified. In 2006, Entertainment Weekly magazine named Cannibal Holocaust as the 20th most controversial film of all time.

==== August Underground trilogy ====
This trilogy of horror films (2001, 2003 and 2007), which depict graphic tortures and murders, is shot as if it were amateur footage made by a serial killer and his accomplices. In 2005, director and lead actor Fred Vogel, who was traveling with copies of the first two films to attend a horror film festival in Canada, was arrested by Canadian customs pending charges of transporting obscene materials into the country. The charges were eventually dropped after Vogel had spent ten hours in custody.

== See also ==
- Analog horror
- Beheading video
- Cannibal film
- Crush film
- Dark web
- Dnepropetrovsk maniacs
- Ero guro
- Extreme cinema
- Hurtcore
- Livestreamed crime
- Martyrdom video
- Mondo films
- Nightcrawler (film)
- Public execution
- Shock site
- Shot-on-video film
- Splatter film
- Armin Meiwes, German cannibal who videotaped the mutilation and murder of his voluntary victim
- Christchurch mosque shootings, whose perpetrator livestreamed himself during the shootings
- Murder of Jun Lin, committed by Luka Magnotta who filmed himself mutilating the victim's corpse
- Peter Scully, Australian sex offender and murderer who made a film featuring the torture and rape of three children
- R. Budd Dwyer, politician who committed suicide during a live press conference
- R. C. Hörsch, a pornographic filmmaker linked to the disappearance of several women, and is the subject of an ongoing police investigation
- Ricardo López, celebrity stalker who filmed himself committing suicide
- Suicide of Ronnie McNutt, livestreamed on Facebook
