= Kennedy v. Mendoza-Martinez =

- Supreme Court of the United States

Argued October 10–11, 1961 Reargued December 4–5, 1962 Decided February 18, 1963
- Full case name: Robert F. Kennedy, Attorney General v. Francisco Mendoza-Martinez
- Citations: 372 U.S. 144 (more) 83 S. Ct. 554; 9 L. Ed. 2d 644; 1963 U.S. LEXIS 2095
- Argument: Oral argument
- Reargument: Reargument

Holding
- The Immigration and Nationality Act of 1952 provisions which purport to deprive an American of his citizenship for draft evasion, automatically and without any prior judicial or administrative proceedings was unconstitutional, because they are essentially penal in character and would inflict severe punishment without due process of law and without the safeguards which must attend a criminal prosecution under the Fifth and Sixth Amendments.

Court membership
- Chief Justice Earl Warren Associate Justices Hugo Black · William O. Douglas; Tom C. Clark · John M. Harlan II; William J. Brennan Jr. · Potter Stewart; Byron White · Arthur Goldberg

Case opinions
- Majority: Goldberg, joined by Warren, Black, Douglas, Brennan
- Concurrence: Brennan
- Dissent: Harlan, joined by Clark
- Dissent: Stewart, joined by White

Kennedy v. Mendoza-Martinez, 372 U.S. 144 (1963), was a Supreme Court of the United States case in which the Court amended United States nationality law with respect to draft evasion.

== Background ==
Francisco Mendoza-Martinez (a natural-born United States citizen) confessed to the court that he had moved to Mexico (where he also had citizenship status) in 1942 for the purpose of evading the responsibilities of the Selective Training and Service Act of 1940 (for which he served a year in prison). After his release from prison, Mendoza-Martinez was ordered deported on the grounds that he was not a US citizen (part of the Selective Training and Service Act, as amended by the Immigration and Nationality Act of 1952, stripped draft evaders of their citizenship).

Mendoza-Martinez charged that the penalties prescribed by Section 401(j) of the Selective Training and Service Act and by Section 349(a)(10) of the Immigration and Nationality Act were in violation of the due process protections granted by the Fifth and Sixth Amendments to the United States Constitution. The case, heard jointly with Rusk v. Cort, was appealed to the Supreme Court by United States Attorney General Robert F. Kennedy.

== Supreme Court decision ==
In a five-to-four decision, the Supreme Court ruled in favor of Mendoza-Martinez (but upheld his conviction for draft evasion), upholding the ruling by the Southern District Court of California. The two statutes in question were declared unconstitutional. Speaking for the court, Supreme Court Justice Arthur Goldberg stated:

The imperative necessity for safeguarding these rights to procedural due process under the gravest of emergencies has existed throughout our constitutional history, for it is then, under the pressing exigencies of crisis, that there is the greatest temptation to dispense with guarantees which, it is feared, will inhibit government action.

In other words, the court acknowledged the expanded powers of Congress during wartime, but also ruled that those wartime powers do not permit Congress to circumvent the measures of due process.

== See also ==
- The Constitution is not a suicide pact
- "The Man Without a Country"
