= Armin Meiwes =

German murderer and cannibal (born 1961)

- Born: 1 December 1961 (age 64); Essen, North Rhine-Westphalia, West Germany
- Other names: Kannibale von Rotenburg (Rotenburg Cannibal); Der Metzgermeister (The Master Butcher)
- Occupation: Computer repair technician (former)
- Status: Incarcerated
- Motive: Sexual gratification
- Convictions: Murder; Disturbing the peace of the dead
- Penalty: Life imprisonment (previously 8½ years' imprisonment)

Details
- Victims: Bernd Jürgen Brandes, aged 43
- Date: 9 March 2001
- Locations: Wüstefeld, Hesse, Germany
- Date apprehended: 10 December 2002

Armin Meiwes (German: [ˈmaɪvəs]; born 1 December 1961) is a German former computer repair technician who received international attention for murdering and cannibalising Bernd Brandes, whom he had found via the Internet as a voluntary victim, in March 2001.

After Meiwes and the victim jointly attempted to eat the victim's severed penis, Meiwes murdered his victim and proceeded to eat a large amount of his flesh. He was arrested in December 2002. In January 2004, Meiwes was convicted of manslaughter and sentenced to eight years and six months in prison. In a retrial in May 2006, he was convicted of murder and sentenced to life imprisonment. Because of his acts, Meiwes is also known as the Rotenburg Cannibal or Der Metzgermeister (The Master Butcher), from the signature he used in his e-mails.

== Early life ==
Armin Meiwes was born in Essen as the third child of Waltraud Vetter (1922–1999) and her then-boyfriend Dieter Meiwes (born 1941); the pair married the year following the birth. Waltraud was a housewife and Dieter worked as a police officer. Through his mother, Meiwes had two older half-brothers by different fathers, who were raised with him in Holsterhausen district. Dieter separated from Waltraud in 1969 and filed for divorce when Meiwes was twelve. Meiwes dropped out of Hauptschule and attended commercial training without completion.

In 1980, after his elder brothers moved out, Meiwes and his mother moved to Wüstefeld, a hamlet part of Rotenburg an der Fulda, where the family had, since 1966, owned an estate, composed of a 44-room Gründerzeit-era house and pony stables. The town had a population of 30 in 2001.

=== Waltraud Meiwes ===
Psychologists described Waltraud Meiwes as domineering and controlling over her son's life. She held misandrist views due to her failed romantic relationships and sought to make her youngest son fully dependent on her. Former girlfriends and colleagues of Meiwes recalled that she would always accompany him to dates and work trips, with Meiwes stating that he was raised to believe this was normal. Since Meiwes' childhood she had manipulated him into performing most household chores and would humiliate him in front of friends by telling them his embarrassing secrets and calling him by the pet name "Minchen". Essen police recorded that Waltraud Meiwes had filed a false murder accusation against a female acquaintance of her then-husband in 1965. During the encounter with officers and the accused woman, Waltraud pretended to faint to avoid having to explain herself. A number of journals written by Waltraud contained comprehensive 19th-century genealogies and an autobiography, which notably skipped any mention of her marriages or upbringing of her children. Until Meiwes was nearly 20 years old, she kept the door to his room adorned with the words "children's bedroom".

Both of her ex-husbands cited mental cruelty as the reason for their divorce; the father of her second child, whom she met after his return from a Russian prisoner-of-war camp, died in a mental hospital after attempting to kill Waltraud in a failed murder-suicide gas explosion. Her third husband Dieter stated that Waltraud did not want a third child, but that she did so anyway to "bind [her husband] more tightly to her". Meiwes described himself as being closer to his father growing up, finding his mother "eccentric", but that after their separation, she was his closest contact for almost all his life.

== Adulthood ==
=== Military service and career ===
Between 1981 and 1993, Meiwes served as a contractual soldier in the German Army, largely spent stationed at the Alheimer barracks outside of Rotenburg, and became a non-commissioned officer of the 52nd Panzergrenadier Brigade. Due to the close proximity to his home, Meiwes drove back and forth to continue to live with his mother. Soldiers and civilian employees described him as professional and obliging, always allowing leaves and offering to help in the private lives of his subordinates. Between 1984 and 1985, he was engaged to a woman, but Meiwes ended the relationship because he found her too similar in character and appearance to his mother. Meiwes claimed to have met his ex-fiancée, as well as other women, through a matchmaker and that after the break-up, he focused more on his career, finishing administrative training in Sonthofen and Unna in 1986. On 16 December 1986, Meiwes totalled his car after crashing into a telephone pole while driving home drunk from a Christmas party, resulting in a 1,500-mark fine and a nine-month driver's licence suspension. Shortly after regaining his driving privileges, Meiwes had another traffic collision, this time causing another vehicle to overturn, injuring the two occupants. The case led to Meiwes hiring attorney Harald Ermel, who remained his legal counsel for the later homicide trials. Meiwes was ultimately sentenced to a 1,280-mark fine. According to Meiwes, the drunk driving convictions led to his military superiors excluding him from promotions. In 1988, Meiwes had a brief romantic relationship with a fellow male soldier while stationed in Canada on CFB Shilo.

Meiwes had originally planned to run a computer teaching school with his brothers, but following his discharge with the rank of Oberfeldwebel, Meiwes instead found work as an IT specialist for the data centre of a bank in Kassel. Neighbours described Meiwes as polite and well kempt in appearance, regularly attending and helping to organise events in the small community. Meiwes was known to be entrusted with children, babysitting the children of his neighbours and annually acting as Santa Claus for Christmas. He gave driving courses for teenagers and often voiced his wish to settle down and have children of his own. Two relationships with local women failed after Meiwes disclosed his preferences for both sexes.

=== Cannibal fetishism ===
During sessions with police experts, Meiwes had explained that his desire for cannibalism had developed during his adolescent years. Having spent summer vacations in rural Wüstefeld, he was introduced to home slaughtering of cattle, poultry, hogs, and deer by neighbours at an early age and taught how to gut small animals such as rabbits around the age of six. He named the fairy tale "Hansel and Gretel" and a film adaptation of the novel Robinson Crusoe as early influences, with the latter standing out to him for featuring a scene where the character Friday voiced interest in "showing his reverence" for a fellow tribesman by consuming his remains.

Meiwes had also described himself feeling "very lonesome" after "the family had fallen apart", referring primarily to the abandonment by his father, but also the poor relationship to his older brothers, as well as the deaths of his grandmother and first pet cat by the time he was eight years old. Combined with his lack of friends, Meiwes created an imaginary little brother named "Franky", after a classmate named Frank. In Meiwes' imagination, "Franky" resembled the character Sandy Ricks (portrayed by Luke Halpin) from the American TV show Flipper. Shortly after beginning puberty, his mother forbade him from making girlfriends, after which Meiwes began experiencing sexual fantasies about "Franky". Specifically, he desired to "become one" with "Franky" by consuming his body, with the fantasy branching out into evisceration and slaughterhouse imagery. Meiwes only attempted to live this fantasy out once before, having wanted to ask a male classmate who bore a close resemblance to "Franky" to "cut off a piece of him", but decided against it for fear of being refused and subsequently ostracised. Meiwes stated that as he grew older, his fantasies would "fade into the background" whenever he was in a relationship, but the death of his mother on 2 September 1999 caused him to focus more intensely on it. Meiwes is bisexual, but stated that his cannibal fetish was exclusively directed at men. He did not disclose the fetish to his ex-fiancée or his boyfriend during his military service.

As an adult, Meiwes kept recordings of TV documentaries about the Vietnam War and read literature about cannibalistic serial killers such as Fritz Haarmann and Jeffrey Dahmer. Meiwes also filmed amateur fetish videos for personal usage, wherein he would cover himself in ketchup while pretending to cut himself, hang himself up by his feet via block and tackle to resemble a slaughtered animal carcass, or eat marzipan and minced meat he had formed into human or phallic shapes. He kept collages of cut-out body parts from pornographic magazines on a grill and copies of the videos locked in a safe, after he stopped producing additional footage when his mother questioned an uncleaned kitchen Meiwes left behind after one nightly filming. With the advent of the internet in the 1990s, Meiwes began frequenting online forums centred around cannibal fetishism since at least 1998, using the alias "Franky" with the username "Antrophagus" and styling himself as a butcher. Meiwes voiced interest primarily in killing, dismembering and cannibalising another person, but also fantasised about being cooked and eaten by someone else.

In early 2000, Meiwes posted more than 60 online advertisements on the forum Nullo, which was dedicated to "fantasies of emasculation" and similar male genital mutilation. The adverts, written in English, stated that he was "looking for a well-built 18- to 30-year-old to be slaughtered and then consumed". Several people responded to the advertisement but backed out; Meiwes specifically requested volunteers and did not attempt to force them to do anything against their will. The ads also appeared on another site, the Cannibal Café, which, contrary to some media reports, was not where Meiwes met Brandes, as it was primarily centred around the (fantasy) cannibalisation of women.

At the same time, Meiwes scoured adverts by people who claimed they were willing to be killed and eaten, chatting at length with two users, though neither ultimately followed up on their offer. "Luke", self-identified as a 20-year-old Austrian man, stated that his family was going to undertake the slaughtering instead of Meiwes, set for 7 January 2001 during Orthodox Christmas. "Matteo", a middle-aged Italian man, originally agreed to be "whipped to death" and "grilled" with either a flamethrower or two portable electric heaters while nailed to a St Andrew's Cross, but reconsidered due to the cannibal aspect.

At Matteo's request, Meiwes had converted a part of his attic, which formerly held a smoke chamber, into a "slaughter room". He furnished the room with a metal bed frame, a foldable table, and two nightstands, one holding a comic and the other containing air fresheners. In addition to the two heaters and cross, Meiwes decorated the room with two rubber mannequins, a hatchet, a cat o' nine tails, a self-crafted whip, and a cage made from leftover packaging, also soundproofing the walls with mattresses and particle boards. While Meiwes ultimately only sent pictures of the room to "Matteo", he ended up using the attic for future sexual encounters.

In June 2000, Meiwes met Jörg Buse, a 31-year-old hotel cook from Füssen, going by the username "Meatboy". Buse had similar fantasies about butchering and cooking another human being, becoming a frequent chat partner on a cannibal chat group on Yahoo Messenger. They agreed to meet in real life in the following autumn and after two regular meet-ups in Kassel during October, Meiwes convinced Buse to two "slaughter" sessions. The first time on 12 November, at a hotel in Kassel, Meiwes engaged in foreplay by slathering Buse with olive oil and drawing circles on Buse's naked body, telling him that he would cut meat from these sections. They also talked about the "edibility" of two acquaintances of Buse, who offered to bring them to Meiwes to be knocked unconscious, dismembered, and eaten by the pair. During the second meeting on 19 November at Meiwes' house, Buse left early after seeing the "slaughter room" in person.

On 5 February 2001, nearly a year after Meiwes first posted his cannibal advertisements, Bernd Jürgen Brandes, a 43-year-old bisexual engineer from Berlin, answered one of them under the alias "Cator99".

=== Bernd Brandes ===
Bernd Brandes
- Born: Bernd Jürgen Brandes; 19 January 1958; Berlin-Schöneberg, Germany
- Died: 10 March 2001 (aged 43); Wüstefeld, Hesse, Germany
- Body discovered: 10 December 2002
- Occupation: Telecommunications engineer
- Known for: Being a voluntary victim of Armin Meiwes

Bernd Jürgen Brandes was born on 19 January 1958 in Berlin-Schöneberg as an only child to a wealthy family. His father was a physician and his mother was an anaesthesiologist, working at clinics in Berlin-Zehlendorf. In 1963, Brandes' mother died in a traffic collision during a vacation in Sylt. Police investigation found evidence that the death was a suicide disguised as an accident, likely stemming from guilt due to a medical error she had made the prior year, which led to the death of a patient. Brandes' father never told his son about the true circumstances of his mother's death, which, according to psychologist Klaus Michael Beier, resulted in Brandes developing anxiety issues. Brandes was subsequently raised mostly by au pairs hired by his father, to whom he grew distant after remarriage to an employee at his doctor's office. Beier posits that his negative relationship with his stepmother contributed to his abnormal psychosexual development and wish for castration, later compounded by self-hatred for his sexual orientation.

Brandes excelled in school, attending additional mathematics and fine art classes, as well as receiving awards in swimming competitions. He graduated with average grades from Erich-Hoepner-Gymnasium (now Heinz-Berggruen-Gymnasium) and studied at Technische Universität Berlin, finishing with degrees in control engineering and electrical engineering on 3 November 1983. Brandes worked for the telephony sector of Siemens since 1981 and gained an executive position as division chief in Berlin-Siemensstadt in 1992. His annual salary amounted to €70,000 (equivalent to €111,050 in 2023).

Despite his financial success, Brandes was increasingly unhappy with his life due to interpersonal difficulties. His worsening relations with his father ended with the elder Brandes cutting off contact with his son for coming out in 1990. Between 1987 and 1994, Brandes was engaged to a woman, but the couple broke up after Brandes cheated on her with a man during a business trip to the United States. From 1995 to 2000, Brandes lived in Berlin-Tempelhof, engaging in casual sex with dates from gay bars, as well as maintaining romantic relationships with several women from Germany, the United States and at least one from Nigeria. According to both his female and male partners, Brandes showed no interest in masochistic practices during intercourse with them. Instead, during the same timeframe, he solicited the service of male prostitutes for requests such as biting during oral sex. An anonymous Tanzanian sex worker recounted that Brandes once instructed him to cut off his penis with a knife, but the sex worker refused and used the blunt edge on Brandes without cutting the skin.

Between their first online communications and their in-person meeting, Brandes and Meiwes had near daily e-mail exchanges for a month discussing their plans and paraphilias in detail. Contrary to most media reports, Brandes did not desire to be eaten, but was willing to accommodate Meiwes' cannibal fetish in return for his castration. Brandes previously spoke of being fearful that undertaking the mutilation himself could lead to him being involuntarily committed, so he was willing to be killed and consumed by Meiwes after the act.

Twenty-five-year-old René J., the boyfriend of Brandes since 1998, stated that he had last seen Brandes in late February 2001, shortly after meeting Meiwes online, and that he did not appear different or showed any indication that he would die soon, having bought new electronics. The day before he left to visit Meiwes, Brandes sold his car, wiped all files from his computers, took a day off work under the pretense of getting a hair transplant and placed a handwritten note in a cabinet, leaving all his property to René J.

== Murder of Bernd Brandes ==
On 9 March 2001, at 10:40, Meiwes and Brandes met at Kassel-Wilhelmshöhe station. Meiwes had initially planned to live with Brandes for a few days so they could get to know each other, but Brandes insisted the "slaughter" should take place that day. They drove to Meiwes' house in Wüstefeld, where they cuddled and made out on a mattress for several hours. They set up video equipment to film the mutilation of Brandes. Meiwes had prepared six knives, a hatchet and a meat grinder for the act. Additionally, Meiwes had downloaded and translated a step-by-step guide for the butchering of a human male.

As per the latter's original wish, Meiwes first attempted to bite off Brandes' penis, but failed. Meiwes asked to use a knife instead and had Brandes drink a 180 mL bottle of alcoholic Vicks MediNait cough syrup to induce slowed breathing and extreme tiredness to ease the process. Brandes first decided to cancel, believing his partner was "too benign" to hurt him, but Brandes changed his mind after buying a return ticket at the station. On the way back, Meiwes stopped by a pharmacy and bought a 20-pack of Vivinox sleeping pills and another bottle of cough syrup, which Brandes consumed at least halfway each. At the house, Brandes claimed that the intended effects were not kicking in, but that he was instead having mild hallucinations of moving animal shapes. Brandes drank some schnapps to calm himself and was later determined to have had a blood alcohol content of 0.14%. At around 18:30, Meiwes made his first attempt at castrating Brandes. Because he had difficulty cutting into the flesh, Meiwes then used a sharper blade to cut off Brandes' penis. Brandes cried out in pain, but was dismayed that the sensation was not as intense as hoped. After Meiwes bandaged the wound, the pair attempted to consume Brandes' penis together. Brandes apparently tried to eat some of his own penis raw but could not, because it was too tough and, as he put it, "chewy". Meiwes then fried the penis in a pan with salt, pepper, wine, and garlic; he then fried it with some of Brandes' fat, but by then it was too burnt to be consumed by either man. According to court officials who saw the video (which has not been made public), Brandes may already have been too weakened from blood loss to eat any of his own penis. Disappointed by this outcome, Brandes told Meiwes, "If I hold out until morning, we can still have my balls for breakfast. You get one, I get one".

Meiwes then ran Brandes a bath, before going to read a Star Trek book, while checking on Brandes every fifteen minutes, during which time Brandes lay bleeding in the bath, drifting in and out of consciousness. After two hours, Brandes returned to the "slaughter room" to sleep on a bed. Shortly after, between 3:00 and 4:00, Brandes attempted to get up to use the restroom, despite Meiwes saying that he did not mind if Brandes urinated on the mattress. When Brandes stood up, he immediately collapsed from blood loss and believing Brandes had died, Meiwes tied him to a table and cut off parts of his body. Meiwes noted later that upon reviewing the video footage, Brandes may have still been breathing by this point. After long hesitation and prayer, Meiwes killed Brandes by stabbing him in the throat, after which he finished the dismemberment and hung the body on a meat hook. The incident was recorded on a four-hour videotape, which has never been released to the public due to its gruesome contents. Four screenshots allegedly from the videotape can be found online, but their credibility is unproven.

=== Disposal of body and later meetings ===
Meiwes dismembered and ate the corpse over the next ten months, storing body parts in his freezer under pizza boxes and consuming up to 20 kilograms (44 lb) of the flesh. The bones were buried in the ground of the estate, while the head of Brandes, initially kept in deep freeze, was also buried six months after his death. According to prosecutors, Meiwes committed the act for sexual pleasure. Meiwes for his part claimed that he had now "assimilated" Brandes, and that he possessed better English and math skills from consuming his flesh. The family of Brandes did not report him missing and a missing report by his boyfriend on 12 March 2001 found no leads after Brandes left Berlin.

Between 2001 and 2002, Meiwes arranged between 30 and 40 "slaughter meetings". Most of the men, aged in their twenties to fifties and described as "well educated with high incomes", met Meiwes in Wüstefeld and Kassel, but sometimes he would drive to their locations, including Hamburg, Dresden, and the Netherlands. The majority backed out from more drastic practices suggested by Meiwes, being only interested in role-playing scenarios, but some participants with BDSM fetishes allowed themselves to be tied up and strung up on the block and tackle. Meiwes voiced a preference for young, lean males with blond hair, but pursued every offer he received.

At least four men had agreed to be slaughtered; all but one backed out after realising that Meiwes was serious about his offer. "Andreas" from Regensburg was hung upside down, stabbed with pin needles signed "filet" and "ham", covered in plastic film and lunch meat, but decided to break off the "slaughter" since he didn't want to actually die, instead eating pizza and drinking beer with Meiwes during the evening. 26-year-old "Alexander" from Essen volunteered to be killed, but insisted on being decapitated on the spot. Meiwes did not go through with this because the victim was "too indecisive and fat" for his liking. On 7 December 2001, 37-year-old "Thomas", a leather and boot fetishist, was locked in a cage and strung upside down, but also voiced no desire to be slaughtered.

In June 2001, Meiwes again met with Jörg Buse, who sent Meiwes photos of his colleagues and repeated his offers of bringing them over to be eaten. This time, Buse voiced a particular dislike for one of the men for being named sous-chef as a new hire in place of him and had also somehow obtained nude photos of the man's stomach. Meiwes specifically refused these requests because he insisted on knowing and willing people. After repeating the same foreplay from their first meeting at Buse's apartment in St. Georgen, they met again at Meiwes' house on the night to 4 November 2001. Buse was shaved of his armpit and pubic hair in the same tub Brandes had bled out in before Meiwes consensually tied him up and strung Buse upside down in the "slaughter room". Meiwes repeatedly asked Buse if he would like to be slaughtered in place of his acquaintances, which he repeatedly denied. The pair stopped the hanging play when Buse complained of sore ankles and the cold room temperature. The two continued to meet on-and-off for the following year. The last "slaughter meeting" took place on 14 July 2002, when 27-year-old Dirk Moeller, a German-born hotelier from London, arrived at Meiwes' house to be "sentenced to death by the Cannibal Court" and eaten as punishment, but backed out after being shown a video of Meiwes engaging in the pulley hanging with Buse. On 6 October 2002, a fifth man, "Stefan" from Kassel, with a consensual non-consent fetish was tied up and drugged with chloroform, but not harmed. A final man, 22-year-old "Daniel" from Kassel, met with Meiwes twice, the final time on 5 December 2002 and had his buttocks and thighs bitten by Meiwes. For the most part, however, Meiwes would invite men for non-slaughter-related meetings for sex, on average twice a month.

=== Arrest ===
On 9 July 2002, a 23-year-old Austrian university student from Innsbruck, browsing online using a search engine with the key words "Horror and Nervous Thrills", found one of Meiwes' new advertisements and wrote an e-mail to Meiwes, asking if he had actually killed anyone. When Meiwes answered in the affirmative, the student responded with disgust and disapproval and on 27 October of the same year, the student reported Meiwes' e-mail address to the authorities on suspicions of homicide. Wiesbaden police took two months to identify "Franky" as Armin Meiwes.

Meiwes was subjected to a house search on 10 December 2002 and agreed to enter police custody in Bad Hersfeld for questioning. Investigators found the "slaughter room" and the remains of Brandes, portioned into three bags, in the freezer, but could not identify it as human flesh on first glance. The bags were nevertheless confiscated and sent in for analysis to the Institute for Forensic Medicine in Giessen. Meanwhile, during a three-hour interrogation, Meiwes admitted to the exchange with the Austrian student and affirmed that he would, as written in his advert, kill someone with their express permission, but refused to answer questions pertaining to the suspicious meat found in his residence. Based on these responses, Meiwes was charged with representation of violence (Gewaltdarstellung), but released since there was not enough evidence to keep him in remand. The same day, Meiwes called his lawyer, Harald Ermel, and confessed to the murder. Meiwes was advised to contact police, to whom he repeated his confession and agreed to turn himself in at his lawyer's office in Rotenburg.

On 11 December, police recovered body parts in the yard and personal belongings of Brandes. Only the head, hands, feet, and a few of the bones were found. Meiwes had pointed out the burial locations and handed in a wristwatch owned by Brandes he wore at the time of his arrest. In total, 1,742 diskettes, 228 video cassettes, 221 hard drives, 16 PCs, 95 CD-ROMs and 23 magnetic tapes were confiscated from Meiwes' home. Of these, only 21 of the cassettes were deemed case-related. The same evening, two Hesse State Police officers reviewed the tape, but did not watch it completely, reasoning that they "satisfied the evidentiary requirements" by transcribing the mutilation and act of killing alone, with no need to watch and document the dismemberment. On 13 December, police conducted a second search of Meiwes' property with sniffer dogs to ensure that no other body parts were buried. On 19 December, the case was passed to Hesse LKA and a special investigative commission was formed.

Brandes' funeral was held the following year at a secret location outside of Berlin to avoid coverage by the press and future defacement by vandals. It was only attended by Brandes' boyfriend, a few of their friends, and some police officials doubling as security.

==== Related investigations ====
Around 430 internet users were found on Meiwes' contact list on the cannibal forum, with those living in Germany being questioned while those residing abroad were left alone. Most of Meiwes' later partners were identified, of whom one was criminally charged. Jörg Buse faced legal action on suspicion as an accomplice/conspiracy of murder for offering to provide victims to Meiwes, but the case was suspended, with a monetary fine and compulsory psychiatric counselling imposed. Buse was required to write apology letters to the two colleagues he had named, but neither provided responses. Eugen A., listed as a "slaughter colleague" in Meiwes' contacts, was tried for representation of violence because he received four photos of Brandes' dead body via e-mail, two on 21 February 2002 and another two on 5 December upon request.

=== Trial and manslaughter conviction ===
While jailed at Justizvollzugsanstalt Kassel I, Meiwes was diagnosed with a schizoid personality but deemed mentally fit to stand trial. While in jail, Meiwes sold the rights to his life story to the German magazine Stern. During interviews, Meiwes initially described his actions as assisted suicide. In a letter to Brandes' boyfriend, Meiwes wrote that he expressed "deepest condolences", but also that the killing was "a beautiful death, which Bernd had wished for for years". The trial acknowledged the agreement of the victim as not occurring under force, but emphasised that this did not make the act of killing legal, with special consideration for Brandes' impaired mental state, possibly further altered by his intake of sedative drugs, at the time of his death. During the trial, a 19-minute snippet of the four-hour tape depicting the murder of Brandes was played. On 30 January 2004, the regional court of Kassel convicted Meiwes of manslaughter and sentenced him to eight years and six months in prison. The case attracted considerable media attention.

When speaking to a German newspaper, Meiwes admitted to cannibalising Brandes and expressed regret for his actions. He added he wanted to write a biography with the aim of deterring anyone wanting to follow in his footsteps. Websites dedicated to Meiwes started appearing after his 2002 arrest, with people advertising for willing victims. "They should go for treatment, so it doesn't escalate like it did with me", said Meiwes. While in prison, Meiwes has since become a vegetarian. From prison, he kept correspondence with criminologist Petra Klages and a former neighbour from Wüstefeld.

=== Retrial and murder conviction ===
On 22 April 2005, the German Federal Court ordered a retrial after prosecutors appealed Meiwes' sentence, arguing that he should have been convicted of murder because he killed for sexual gratification, a motive proved by his having videotaped the crime. The court ruled that the original trial had ignored the significance of the video in disproving the argument that Meiwes only killed because he had been asked to kill.

His retrial began on 12 January 2006. A psychologist stated that Meiwes could re-offend, as he "still had fantasies about devouring the flesh of young people." On 10 May 2006, the higher regional court of Frankfurt am Main convicted Meiwes of murder and sentenced him to life imprisonment.

=== Incarceration ===
Between 2006 and 2018, Meiwes was imprisoned at Justizvollzugsanstalt Kassel II, a sociotherapeutic correctional facility. In June 2018, he was transferred to JVA Kassel I, where he remained as of August 2025. Back in 2020, Meiwes had been given permission to go outside of prison for supervised excursions in disguise around town in a different state. In prison, Meiwes works at the laundry and often attends church service.

Meiwes was or is politically active as a member of the "Grüne Knastgruppe" (Green Prison Group), a political group of inmates. They align themselves with the party Alliance 90/The Greens. Several members of the group are also members of the party itself, Meiwes among them. However, this drew criticism from other political parties—particularly the Christian Democratic Union of Germany (CDU)—prompting the Greens to decide that, while they would not recognize Meiwes as a full-fledged party member, he was nonetheless entitled to political participation as part of his social reintegration. For a time, Meiwes served as the leader of the Green Prison Group.

In October 2018, Frankfurt court ruled that Meiwes would not be eligible for parole after 15 years and would only receive any form of release if psychiatrists judged him to pose no further danger to society at large. Appeals for early release were denied in November 2017 and August 2020. A complaint filed against the higher regional court of Frankfurt for the former appeal denial was dismissed with the specific reason that Meiwes was deemed likely for recidivism.

In July 2025, after replacing his original attorney earlier in the year, Meiwes again requested early release on parole. Frankfurt's public prosecutor's office filed for a denial of the request but agreed after talks with Meiwes and his legal defence to have any hearings related to the request adjourned until 2026. Meiwes' new lawyer, Frank Füglein, also complained that Meiwes had been deprived of regular psychotherapy appointments and supervised furlough in recent years. Following reports on the release request in August 2025, Meiwes wrote a letter to the Hessische/Niedersächsische Allgemeine newspaper, as he disagreed with their description of the cannibalism. Meiwes emphasised that while he and Brandes had attempted to eat the latter's penis, neither managed to actually consume it, also repeating that the castration occurred at Brandes' insistence.

== Aftermath ==
In February 2004, it was reported by the Daily Star that British actor Hugh Grant was interested in acquiring the rights to make a dramatised movie, with Grant to play the role of Meiwes. The Guardian, citing sources close to Grant, claimed that Brad Pitt was being considered to star as Brandes, with other candidates including Matt Damon and Benicio del Toro. Meiwes' lawyer disputed the reports, saying that his client had received multiple film offers but none from Grant. In return for film rights, the offers reportedly promised up to €1 million for Meiwes.

German filmmakers such as Sascha Schwingel and Artur Brauner reacted negatively to the idea of producing a movie based on the murder, due to moral grounds and artistic reasons. Holm Dressler stated he would consider a "serious" film loosely based on the events, since he disliked the thought of paying royalty fees to Meiwes.

=== Meiwes' house ===
Since the arrest of Meiwes, his house was considered a "lost place" destination for urban explorers and the true crime fandom. In January 2004, while Meiwes' trial was still ongoing, an American investor attempted to buy the property to turn it into a theme hotel called "Cannibal World", complete with shuttle bus service, photoshoots, and a "Cannibal Café". The offer was retracted due to refusal by both Meiwes and local residents. The home was frequently broken into and there were several incidents of small-scale fires being set inside. Such a fire in 2007 resulted in a garden shed burning down.

On the night of 16–17 April 2023, Meiwes' former home was burnt down in an arson attack. Meiwes' lawyer Harald Ermel stated that his client, who was still the legal owner of the home, has continued to deny offers to sell either the property or his Mercedes-Benz car. Rotenburg mayor Christian Grunwald voiced hope that the fire would stop the flow of true crime tourists from coming into town but was also concerned that the site would remain a "place of pilgrimage" if the rubble was not cleared completely. Ermel was in discussions with city officials about who would pay to clear the debris in order to prevent looting of Meiwes' house for crime memorabilia.

Since June 2023, two juvenile suspects were investigated for the fire, along with three other arsons between 6–17 April in Wüstefeld and Alheim-Heinebach, due to videos of the fires found on their phones. In November 2025, both defendants, by then aged 20 and 18, were convicted of the fire alongside a 21-year-old man. The 20-year-old was sentenced to two weeks' juvenile detention while the other two men were given weekend arrest. All three were also required to attend counselling sessions.

== Cultural impact ==
=== Films ===
- Grimm Love (German title: Rohtenburg; 2006), a feature film directed by Martin Weisz and starring Keri Russell, was banned in Germany in March 2006 after Meiwes complained that his personality rights had been violated, but the film had already been sold for international release and was shown worldwide. In May 2009, the Federal Court of Justice, Germany's highest civil court, annulled the ban in favour of freedom of arts. The film won multiple awards at the 2006 Sitges Film Festival, including Best Director, Best Actor for the two male leads, and Best Cinematography.
- Cannibal, a Marian Dora feature. The film is notable for its graphic portrayal of the cannibalistic incidents.

=== Music ===
- The death metal band Bloodbath released the song "Eaten" on their 2004 album Nightmares Made Flesh, inspired by the Meiwes case.
- The German industrial metal band Rammstein released the song "Mein Teil" in 2004, which specifically references the Meiwes case. MTV Germany restricted airing the video to after 11:00 p.m.
- The rock musician Marilyn Manson has identified Meiwes as an inspiration in the titling of his album Eat Me, Drink Me.
- The heavy metal singer Ozzy Osbourne released his 12th studio album, Ordinary Man, in February 2020. The album includes a song titled "Eat Me", which was inspired by Armin Meiwes.
- Australian industrial rock band Skynd released a track entitled "Armin Meiwes" in 2022.

=== Television ===
- In 2008, MORE Music and Media released the four-hour interview and documentary from RTL Extra on DVD as Der Kannibale von Rotenburg; it was released in the UK as Armin Meiwes: The Cannibal.
- Season 1, episode 1 of the TV series Rake, titled "R.V. Murray", features an accused cannibal who eats his volunteer in similar circumstances to the Meiwes case.
- Season 2, episode 4 of the TV series Room 104, titled "Hungry", features two strangers who meet to fulfill a mutual fantasy, in similar circumstances to the Meiwes case.
- In season 3, episode 7 of Hannibal, the character of Mason Verger refers to the incident after interrupting Hannibal Lecter's attempt to murder Will Graham; specifically, Hannibal cutting open Will's skull to consume his brain: "You boys remind me of that German cannibal who advertised for a friend and then ate him—and his penis—before he died. Tragedy being the penis was overcooked. Go to all that trouble to eat a friend and you overcook his penis! They ate it anyway. They had to. They committed. But they didn't enjoy it."
- Series 2, episode 3 of the British sitcom The IT Crowd is based on Meiwes. Titled "Moss and the German", it follows character Maurice Moss signing up for what he believes to be a German cookery course, responding to an advert that states "I want to cook with you"; however, this is due to the poor English of Johan, the German, who actually wanted to cook Moss, rather than teaching him to cook. Moss notices Johan's impressive home cinema and they instead watch Ocean's Eleven, which Meiwes reportedly did with a previous volunteer, who had also changed his mind. Writer and Director Graham Linehan states that the episodes was based on Meiwes and this story in a behind-the-scenes extra on the series 2 DVD.

=== Theatre ===
- In 2014, TASTE, an award-winning play inspired by the case, premiered in Los Angeles at the Sacred Fools Theater Company. The play was written by Screenwriter Benjamin Brand and directed by Stuart Gordon. The production was nominated for various awards from all of the major Los Angeles theatrical critic organisations. The production starred Chris McKenna and Donal Thoms-Cappello, and was produced by Gordon, Dean Schramm, Ben Rock, and Adam Goldworm.
- In 2022, The Royal Theatre in Copenhagen, Denmark, premiered the play KANNIBALEN by playwright Johannes Lilleøre. The production featured the actors Patrick Baurichter and Morten Burian. On the opening night, the show had to be paused for about fifteen minutes due to the fact that one audience member vomited and another experienced an epileptic seizure.
- Also in 2022, Conflicted Theatre's play FIJI premiered at Omnibus Theatre in London, UK. Co-written by actors Pedro Leandro and Eddie Loodmer-Elliott together with director Evan Lordan, a Guardian reviewer called the two-hander funny, disturbing, and "surprisingly gentle". The production was twice nominated for the 2022 Offies for Best Lead Performance, and was subsequently revived at the Edinburgh Fringe. An Edmonton Fringe festival production in 2023 received 5 out of 5 stars from the Edmonton Journal, which described it as "charming, emotional and calmly unnerving, this is easily some of the festival's finest fare."

== See also ==
- Consensual crime
- Internet homicide
- Killing of Sharon Lopatka
- List of incidents of cannibalism
- Murder of Jun Lin
- Killing of Nguyễn Xuân Đạt
- Snuff film
