= The Constitution is not a suicide pact =

Phrase in U.S. politics and law

In American political and legal discourse, "the Constitution is not a suicide pact" expresses the belief that constitutional restrictions on governmental power must be balanced against the need for survival of the state and its people. It is most often attributed to Abraham Lincoln, as a response to charges that he was violating the United States Constitution by suspending habeas corpus during the American Civil War. Although the phrase echoes statements made by Lincoln, and although versions of the sentiment have been advanced at various times in American history, the precise phrase suicide pact was first used in this context by Justice Robert H. Jackson in his dissenting opinion in Terminiello v. Chicago, a 1949 free speech case decided by the U.S. Supreme Court. The phrase also appears in the same context in Kennedy v. Mendoza-Martinez, a 1963 U.S. Supreme Court decision written by Justice Arthur Goldberg.

== Jefferson's formulation ==
Thomas Jefferson offered one of the earliest formulations of the sentiment, although not of the phrase. In 1803, Jefferson's ambassadors to France arranged the purchase of the Louisiana territory in conflict with Jefferson's personal belief that the Constitution did not bestow upon the federal government the right to acquire or possess foreign territory. Due to political considerations, however, Jefferson disregarded his constitutional doubts, signed the proposed treaty, and sent it to the Senate for ratification. In justifying his actions, he later wrote:

A strict observance of the written law is doubtless one of the high duties of a good citizen, but it is not the highest. The laws of necessity, of self-preservation, of saving our country when in danger, are of higher obligation. To lose our country by a scrupulous adherence to the written law, would be to lose the law itself, with life, liberty, property and all those who are enjoying them with us; thus absurdly sacrificing the ends to the means.

== Lincoln's suspension of habeas corpus ==
Under Article I, section 9 of the United States Constitution, habeas corpus can be suspended in cases of rebellion or invasion. The Confederacy was rebelling, making the suspension of habeas corpus constitutional. The Constitution, however, does not specify who may suspend habeas corpus — Congress or the president or both. Some, including Chief Justice Roger Taney in Ex parte Merryman during the American Civil War, have argued that only Congress may do so, because Article I prescribes the powers of Congress. But the question has never been settled. Lincoln, in John Merryman's case, nevertheless exercised the power by executive order.

After habeas corpus was suspended by General Winfield Scott in one theater of the Civil War in 1861, Lincoln wrote that Scott "could arrest, and detain, without resort to ordinary processes and forms of law, such individuals as he might deem dangerous to public safety." After Chief Justice Taney criticized the president for this policy, Lincoln responded in a Special Session to Congress on July 4, 1861, that an insurrection "in nearly one-third of the States had subverted the whole of the laws ... Are all the laws, but one, to go unexecuted, and the government itself go to pieces, lest that one be violated?"

Later in the war, after some had criticized the arrest and detention of Congressman Clement Vallandigham of Ohio, Lincoln wrote to Erastus Corning in June 1862 that Vallandigham was arrested "because he was laboring, with some effect, to prevent the raising of troops, to encourage desertions from the army, and to leave the rebellion without an adequate military force to suppress it.... Must I shoot a simple-minded deserter, while I must not touch a hair of a wily agitator who induces him to desert?"

== Stockton's Ku Klux Klan Act of 1871 formulation ==
In debating the Ku Klux Klan Act of 1871, meant to more efficiently combat the Ku Klux Klan during the Reconstruction era, Democratic New Jersey Senator John Potter Stockton remarked that constitutions are "chains with which men bind themselves in their sane moments [so] that they may not die by a suicidal hand in the day of their frenzy."

Whereas the other passages on this page criticize constitutional restraints as resulting in a virtual suicide pact, Stockton makes the opposite argument – praising those constraints as a shield against rash decisions. See also Stephen Holmes, Passion and Constraint: On the Theory of Liberal Government 135 (1995) (arguing that through a constitution, "Peter sober binds Peter drunk.")

== Jackson's Terminiello formulation ==
In the 1949 case Terminiello v. City of Chicago, the majority opinion by Justice William O. Douglas overturned the disorderly conduct conviction of a priest whose impassioned rhetoric at a rally had incited a riot. The court held that Chicago's breach of the peace ordinance violated the First Amendment.

Associate Justice Robert Jackson wrote a twenty-four page dissent in response to the court's four page decision, which concluded: "The choice is not between order and liberty. It is between liberty with order and anarchy without either. There is danger that, if the court does not temper its doctrinaire logic with a little practical wisdom, it will convert the constitutional Bill of Rights into a suicide pact."

== Goldberg's Kennedy formulation ==
Justice Arthur Goldberg wrote the court's opinion in the 1963 U.S. Supreme Court case Kennedy v. Mendoza-Martinez. While the court ultimately determined that laws permitting stripping draft evaders of their citizenship on the basis of a perceived existential threat to the nation were unconstitutional, Goldberg acknowledged the "not a suicide pact" argument, writing: "The powers of Congress to require military service for the common defense are broad and far-reaching, for while the Constitution protects against invasions of individual rights, it is not a suicide pact."

== Posner's application to terrorism ==
In 2006, Judge Richard Posner of the United States Court of Appeals for the Seventh Circuit and professor at the University of Chicago Law School, wrote a book called Not a Suicide Pact: The Constitution in a Time of National Emergency. Posner's position has drawn both critical opposition and support.

== See also ==
- Civil rights
- Defensive democracy
- Doctrine of necessity
- Free speech
- Guantanamo Bay detention camp
- Korematsu v. United States
- Paradox of tolerance
- Trail of Tears
