= Murder of Matthew Pyke =

British student and murder victim

- Location: Nottingham, England
- Date: September 18, 2008; 18 years ago
- Victim: Matthew Pyke
- Perpetrator: David Heiss
- Motive: Jealousy of Pyke's relationship with Joanna Witton
- Verdict: Guilty

Matthew Pyke, of Stowmarket, Suffolk, was a British student who had lived in Nottingham since 2006 with his girlfriend, Joanna Witton. He was murdered by 21-year-old David Heiss from Limburg, Germany, on 19 September 2008. Pyke's murder was motivated by Heiss's obsession with Witton.

Pyke, known online as Shade, was an administrator on the Advance Wars fansite Wars Central, as was Witton, while Heiss was a registered user under the screen name Eagle_the_Lightning.

== Murder ==
Heiss developed an obsessive infatuation with Witton and travelled to Nottingham in both June and August 2008 to meet Witton and Pyke in person. As Heiss didn't have a hotel reservation he stayed one night at the flat of Pyke and Witton. After being admonished and rebuffed by Witton, Heiss travelled to Britain twice more and met Pyke and Witton. During his last visit to the UK, on the morning of 19 September 2008 Heiss forced his way in to Pyke's flat and killed him by stabbing him 86 times. His body was found by Witton later that day.

== Killer's arrest ==
Heiss was arrested at his home in Limburg and in May 2009 he was sentenced to a minimum of 18 years in prison.

== See also ==
- Internet homicide
