= Snuff 102 =

2007 horror film by Mariano Peralta

- DVD released by TProd Films
- Directed by: Mariano Peralta
- Written by: Mariano Peralta
- Produced by: Salvador Haidar
- Starring: Silvia Paz; Eduardo Poli; Yamila Greco; Andrea Alfonso; Rodrigo Bianco; Salvador Haidar
- Cinematography: Sebastián Ciaros
- Edited by: Mariano Peralta
- Music by: El Hemisferio Derecho
- Production company: TProd Films
- Distributed by: TProd Films
- Release date: March 2007 (Mar del Plata Film Festival)
- Running time: 101 minutes
- Country: Argentina
- Language: Spanish

Snuff 102 is a 2007 exploitation horror film written and directed by Mariano Peralta.

== Plot ==
Animal experimentation footage is shown, followed by a video of a man dismembering a female body in a bathtub. It is implied that the man masturbates after the corpse has been sufficiently mutilated. Next, someone browses and clicks on the link for "Snuff Fantasy". Images of animals and people (mostly women) being tortured and killed clutter the screen, followed by a real life video of a pig being stabbed in the throat, squealing and bleeding out. A critic asks "Until what point are you willing to watch? In other words, what do you want to watch?" A crying woman in her underwear (Victim 102) with wrists bound behind her back, tightly cleave-gagged, and barefooted is shown in a bathroom. She manages to force the gag out of her mouth, gets up and moves the shower's curtain. She then screams at what she sees.

The film now goes back one week (in black and white footage), and shows a female journalist (aka Victim 102, portrayed by Yamila Greco) doing her morning routines and watching a newscast about a recently captured serial killer of sex workers. This inspires the journalist to write about violence itself. The reporter accesses the pornographic and shock websites frequented by the killer (being greatly disturbed by their content) and interviews a film critic and author (Eduardo Poli), who discusses topics such as misogyny, fetishes, new media, morality, pornography, snuff, and the value of human life. Intercut with the reporter's research are scenes of her and two other women (a pregnant sex worker and a porn star) being filmed as they are tortured by a masked man (portrayed by Rodrigo Bianco) who labels his captives 100, 101, and 102.

The pregnant woman (Victim 100, portrayed by Andrea Alfonso) is the first to be brutalized. All the while, Victims' 101 and 102 are screaming and moaning through their tightly gagged mouths. Accompanying their gagged moaning is an industrial music score by El Hemisferio Derecho. Victim 100 is beaten, several of her fingers are cut off and a bag is pulled over her head, which is stomped and kicked repeatedly. The masked killer gropes Victim 100, stomps her stomach, bites one of her nipples off, mutilates her genitals with a chef knife, and proceeds to cut her open with the knife. Before moving on, the masked killer then removes the gag of Victim 102 and orally rapes her with the same chef knife while also masturbating. He then reapplies her gag and drags Victim 100 to the bathroom. With the killer now out of sight, Victim 102 flings from the trash-laden floor a shard of glass, held by her toes, to her hands bound behind her to start cutting the rope that binds her wrists to the back of the chair. Coming out of the bathroom, the killer now goes to work on the porn star (Victim 101, portrayed by Silvia Paz). He beats her with a hammer, rips one of her eyes out, asphyxiates her with a bag, knocks her front teeth out with a chisel, and urinates on and rapes her.

While the masked killer is taking Victim 101 apart with a hacksaw, the journalist is desperately trying to free her bare feet from the legs of the chair with her still-bound-behind her-hands. A flashback reveals that she was taken when she found hidden photographs depicting the film critic engaging in necrophilia. (The film critic and the masked killer are discovered to be partners in their sick fantasies.) Now freed from the chair, the still wrists bound-behind-her and gagged journalist escapes from the masked killer to the bathroom and manages to lock the door. Now... returning to the bathroom sequence from the beginning of the film, it is shown that the journalist discovered Victim 100 in the shower. The woman is still alive; something the masked killer rectifies when he breaks into the room, and at first bludgeons Victim 102 with a hammer (temporarily stunning her) but then bludgeons Victim 100 to death. The masked killer then drags the journalist out of the room with a hook impaling her belly, and as he prepares to kill her, she breaks the ropes binding her hands with another shard of glass on the floor, grabs a cellphone, and runs off.

The cellphone will not work, so the journalist tries to find a way out as the masked killer searches for her, machete in hand. The journalist squeezes out a barred window, and is chased into the woods by the masked killer, who catches her. As he strangles her, the journalist grabs a rock, beats the masked killer with it, and then finishes him off with his discarded machete. The journalist stumbles away, and is picked up by a passing motorist.

== Cast ==
- Yamila Greco as the journalist aka Víctim 102
- Eduardo Poli as the Film Critic
- Andrea Alfonso as the pregnant sex worker aka Víctim 100
- Silvia Paz as the porn star aka Víctim 101
- Rodrigo Bianco as the Masked Killer
- Nicolás Blanco as Addict
- Salvador Haidar as Porn Actor
- Lucas Delgado as Contact
- Eduardo Peralta as Cabbie
- Julián Alfonzo as Niño
- Mariano Peralta as Murderer's Voice

== Release ==
Mariano Peralta released a limited edition DVD-R of Snuff 102 in 2007. The film was re-released on standard DVD, as well as VHS, by Massacre Video in 2013.

== Reception ==
A score of six out of seven was awarded by Independent Flicks, which said Snuff 102 was disturbing, with good special effects, and cinematography and a soundtrack that were successful in creating a deeply unsettling and creepy atmosphere. The film was similarly praised by Horror News and Subtitled Hell.

While The Worldwide Celluloid Massacre admitted the film was intense, the website went on to say "it doesn't add up to anything" and that it suffered from an uninteresting plot and "idiotic" attempts at intellectual provocation. Snuff 102 was held in contempt by Soiled Sinema, which heavily criticized the acting, and called it "a bastardizing mess" and "a boring fucking film".
