= Suicide prevention contract =

Historical psychotherapy method

A suicide prevention contract is a contract that contains an agreement not to die by suicide. It was historically used by health professionals dealing with depressive clients. Typically, the client was asked to agree to talk with the professional prior to carrying out any decision to die by suicide. Suicide prevention contracts have been shown not to be effective and have risk of harm. Suicide prevention contracts were once a "widely used but overvalued clinical and risk-management technique." Indeed, it has been argued that such contracts "may in fact increase danger by providing psychiatrists with a false sense of security, thus decreasing their clinical vigilance." It has also been argued that such contracts can anger or inhibit the client and introduce coercion into therapy.

== See also ==
- Suicide pact
