= Killing of Nguyễn Xuân Đạt =

2025 Vietnamese killing and snuff film

- Location: 21°30′3.0132″N 106°20′50.0424″E; Office of the Market Surveillance Unit No. 4, Hữu Lũng commune, Lạng Sơn province, Vietnam
- Date: January 25, 2025; 21 months ago
- Attack type: Beheading, dismemberment
- Weapon: Cleaver
- Victim: Nguyễn Xuân Đạt
- Assailant: Đoàn Văn Sáng
- Charges: Murder

On January 25, 2025, Nguyễn Xuân Đạt was killed and dismembered, in what was later described as a consensual homicide, in Hữu Lũng commune, Lạng Sơn province, Vietnam. The recording of the killing had been circulated on shock sites and social media in late July 2025. In August 2025, American magazine Vice claimed the footage associated with it as the first "real snuff movie". The footage, dubbed The Vietnamese Butcher, was distributed on Telegram groups and dark web marketplaces as early as February 2025.

The murder suspect, former Vietnamese government official Đoàn Văn Sáng, was revealed by Internet users. The alleged evidence against Sáng was published online in an 88-page document, after which his identity was confirmed by the police. The Vietnamese government had later discouraged the public from interacting with the documents. In November 2025, after both international and local outrage, the Ministry of Public Security of Vietnam and the Lạng Sơn provincial police arrested Sáng on charges of homicide.

== The Vietnamese Butcher ==
On July 26, 2025, eleven videos and ninety-eight images of what became known as The Vietnamese Butcher began circulating on Telegram and other encrypted messaging apps. According to the earliest reports as early as February 2025, the videos and images were being sold as a pack on the dark web market and the Chinese platform Baidu Tieba. It was also later released through shock sites and other platforms as an extended version.

The videos, which are recorded from multiple angles, show a naked male masturbating while lying on a bathroom floor with his head on a cutting board. At the moment of orgasm, the assailant beheads the victim using a cleaver. The remainder of the footage depicts the dismemberment of the victim and shows the assailant wearing a face mask while holding the person's severed head. It later showed his internal organs being cooked, although this has not been corroborated by the provincial police or local news reports.

Prior to the recorded killing, another longer video had shown a rehearsal between the two persons where the assailant is shown wearing a Guy Fawkes mask grazing the person's neck with a cleaver before embracing the person at the end of the video.

== Online crime solving ==
Before an official investigation, many citizen Vietnamese investigators had gathered information about the case through open-source intelligence (OSINT). It was deduced that both people were speaking regional Vietnamese accents, and household decor suggested the place of the killing was probably either near the China–Vietnam border or the Cambodia–Vietnam border. While initial suspicions were towards a Buddhist who allegedly interacted with the victim, they were dropped after the Buddhist had denied any involvement.

A Facebook group, "OSINT & Cyber Investigation Vietnam", was created in August 2025 and became highly involved in these unofficial investigations where many users sustained efforts in collecting evidence related to the case. A Telegram group was also created to serve crime solving.

On November 23, an 88-page summary, often called the "88-page document" (Vietnamese: Tài liệu 88 trang), which had collected information about the case and theories about the crime scene, was uploaded to the group. The document became lengthier and eventually became 110 pages by November 27.

== Victim ==
Nguyễn Xuân Đạt
- Born: 1989
- Died: January 25, 2025 (aged 35); Lạng Sơn, Vietnam

The group eventually revealed the victim as Nguyễn Xuân Đạt (born in 1989), residing in Tiên Hưng, Hưng Yên, who was working as a laborer and fishmonger. Đạt was raised in Hanoi by his relatives, his mother saying that he disappeared for nearly ten years after his father's death.

He had reportedly often expressed a desire to be beheaded as he had asked women to behead him, but none were willing. Đạt had also made a comment on a manga piracy site asking someone to translate the ero guro manga Applicant for Death. The manga had also shared similarities with Đạt's death, such as guillotines, consensual homicide and decapitation.

After the murder, Đạt's Facebook account was locked down, which was thought to have been done by the assailant.

== Assailant ==
Around mid-November, an anonymous user in the Facebook group released messages and photos related to the suspect, from which other users assessed them to show civil servant Đoàn Văn Sáng, aged 57 and residing in Tam Thanh, Lạng Sơn. Sáng was the deputy team leader of Market Management Team No. 4, under Market Management Department of Lạng Sơn province. The 88-page document also held Sáng to be responsible because of the similarities between him and the assailant which was strengthened in the 110-page document.

According to Sáng's confessions, he and Đạt had met through social media in 2020 and after getting to know each other, began having what was called by police as "deviant" exchanges. On January 25, 2025, after contact via mobile phone, Đạt had entered Sáng's workplace at the office of Market Surveillance Unit No. 4 (which had been vacant due to Tết celebrations) prior to the incident. Sáng filmed the murder and put the video for sale on the dark web for US$100 in February 2025. Subsequently, someone purchased the full video for US$600, allowing this full version to circulate online. Sáng then disposed of the body to cover up the crime.

Police said that even after the killing, Sáng went to work, stayed active on Facebook and openly chatted as usual. There was no explanation for Sáng's motive given by police.

== Government and police investigation ==
On October 3, 2025, an official notice from the Vietnamese Ministry of Public Security announced that an official investigation of the case had begun after their "observations of the online space". Sin Chew Daily later said that, although the video had spread from the dark web to social domestic platforms, the police had only began an investigation after the release of the 88-page document.

The Ministry of Public Security and Lạng Sơn provincial police arrested Sáng on charges of the murder of Đạt on November 29. The day prior, police issued a decision to "prosecute a criminal case of murder".

The Ministry of Public Security recommended the Lạng Sơn provincial police to expand their investigation to gather evidence for prosecution on December 10, 2025. On that same day, Deputy Minister of Public Security Nguyễn Văn Long sent a letter to the Lạng Sơn provincial police saying that the investigation and prosecution was an "outstanding achievement" which "demonstrat[ed the] determination, high sense of responsibility and professional sharpness" of the police agency.

== Media coverage ==
On August 21, 2025, Ben Ditto of Vice wrote in an article on The Vietnamese Butcher that, though the case had not yet drawn as much international attention as some others, online sleuths were already "working overtime to put names to the victim and the killer". Giving examples of other footage of killings such as the 43-year-old German Bernd Brandes who consented to being killed and eaten never reaching public domain, the 50-minute film depicting the dismemberment of a willing person from the website Zambian Meat by another German Detlev Guenzel being sealed as police evidence and the murder of Jun Lin by Canadian Luka Magnotta who recorded himself murdering and eating Lin in a video later called "1 Lunatic 1 Icepick" only being uploaded to the website Best Gore, Ditto said that The Vietnamese Butcher was the "first bona fide snuff film" as it was recorded to be sold online and for commercial profit. Ditto also suggested that Đạt was a willing participant who, at the very least, "consented to the retail of his death" and likely "encouraged it".

After the release of the 88-page document and Sáng's later arrest, the case had gained significant traction within Vietnamese media as the "gruesome" images and videos being shared online caused public panic and anxiety, pressuring the government and police to act.

The media had also focused on the citizen crime solving efforts in the form of open-source intelligence with many news outlets emphasizing the role of "cyber investigators" in shedding light on the case. Malaysian newspaper Sin Chew Daily later said that as the police had not released any information about the case, netizens "took matters into their own hands" by participating in the investigation and eventually "compil[ing] an investigation report at the end of November" which had revealed the assailant to be Sáng and "speculat[ed] on [where] the possible crime scene" was. Hong Kong's media outlet HK01 and The Straits Times said that "online sleuths" played an important part in revealing Sáng as the assailant and the murder site, with BBC News Vietnamese mentioning that "many people believe that the credit" for the investigation belongs to "cyber detectives".

=== Spread of false information and later prosecution ===
Hưng Yên provincial police had discouraged interacting with the original 88-page or 110-page documents due to "malware concerns" and warned that sharing the documents or images and videos related to the killing could lead to prosecution, with the Ministry of Public Security announcing on December 3, 2025, that such documents had led to the spread of fake news and malware. Hưng Yên provincial police later charged two individuals for spreading false information about the incident on December 25.

== See also ==
- Beheading video
- List of people who were beheaded § Vietnam
- Murder of Bernd Brandes, a similar recorded case of consensual murder and cannibalism
