= Autassassinophilia =

Sexual arousal from the risk of being killed

Autassassinophilia is a paraphilia in which a person is sexually aroused by the risk of being killed. The fetish may overlap with some other fetishes that risk one's life, such as those involving drowning or choking. This does not necessarily mean the person‘s life must actually be put at risk; many are simply aroused by fantasies or simulations of such situations.

== Description ==
The term was introduced by John Money who also defined erotophonophilia as the "reciprocal condition" in which one is aroused by "stage-managing and carrying out the murder of an unsuspecting sexual partner". Money classified both these paraphilias as "of the sacrificial/expiatory type".

== See also ==
- Murder of Bernd Brandes
- Killing of Sharon Lopatka
- Killing of Nguyễn Xuân Đạt

== Bibliography and external links ==
- Rudy Flora, "How to work with sex offenders: a handbook for criminal justice, human service, and mental health professionals", Routledge, 2001, ISBN 0-7890-1499-8, p. 90
- Lisa Downing (June 8, 2004). "On the limits of sexual ethics: The phenomenology of autassassinophilia". Sexuality and Culture. 8: 3–17. doi:10.1007/s12119-004-1002-5. S2CID 143548914.
