= Murder of Carly Ryan =

2007 murder in Port Elliot, Australia

Carly Ryan
- School portrait
- Born: 31 January 1992
- Died: 20 February 2007 (aged 15); Port Elliot, South Australia
- Cause of death: Murder by assault, suffocation, and drowning
- Occupation: Student
- Known for: Victim of catfishing and Internet homicide by an online predator
- Mother: Sonya Ryan
- Website: Memorial website

Carly Ryan (31 January 1992 – 20 February 2007) was an Australian teenager from Stirling, South Australia, who was lured and murdered by a 50-year-old serial paedophile from Melbourne, Garry Francis Newman. Using a fake identity, Newman had posed online as an 18-year-old boy and had sexually groomed Ryan for over 18 months before eventually meeting and killing her.

The case, which highlighted the emerging phenomena of catfishing, child grooming, and online predatory behaviour, was unique at the time, given that Ryan was the first person in Australia to be killed by an online predator. In the wake of the arrest and trial of Newman, public opinion eventually led to nationwide legal changes, nicknamed "Carly's Law", being made to help protect minors online.

== Background ==
Carly Ryan lived in Stirling, South Australia with her mother, Sonya Ryan, and a younger brother. Approximately 18 months before her death, while using MySpace (and Vampirefreaks.com), she befriended "Brandon Kane", a user who claimed to be a Texas-born teen living in Melbourne who was a musician and had similar taste in music as Ryan. Their contact eventually grew from a group chat with friends into a private online and telephone romance.

In late January 2007, Garry Francis Newman, a 50-year-old man who had been using the fictitious Kane persona, travelled from Melbourne posing as "Shane", Kane's father, in order to give Ryan presents from Kane (lingerie and a nurse's outfit). After meeting Newman, Ryan’s mother then allowed him to attend her 15th birthday party and stay overnight. After a shopping trip together, Newman's increasingly erratic and possessive behaviour at the party, along with inappropriate physical advances (including lying on Ryan's bed while she slept in it), led Sonya Ryan to ask him to leave the following morning and have no further contact. Subsequently, she began monitoring her daughter's phone and internet usage more closely.

Three weeks later, on 19 February, Ryan left the house for an apparent sleepover with friends, but after not returning the next day, the police were notified. The same morning, at Horseshoe Bay in Port Elliot, some 70 kilometres away, Ryan's battered and dishevelled body was found floating face-down in the shallow water, and attempts by a passerby to revive her failed.

== Investigation ==
Murder of Carly Ryan
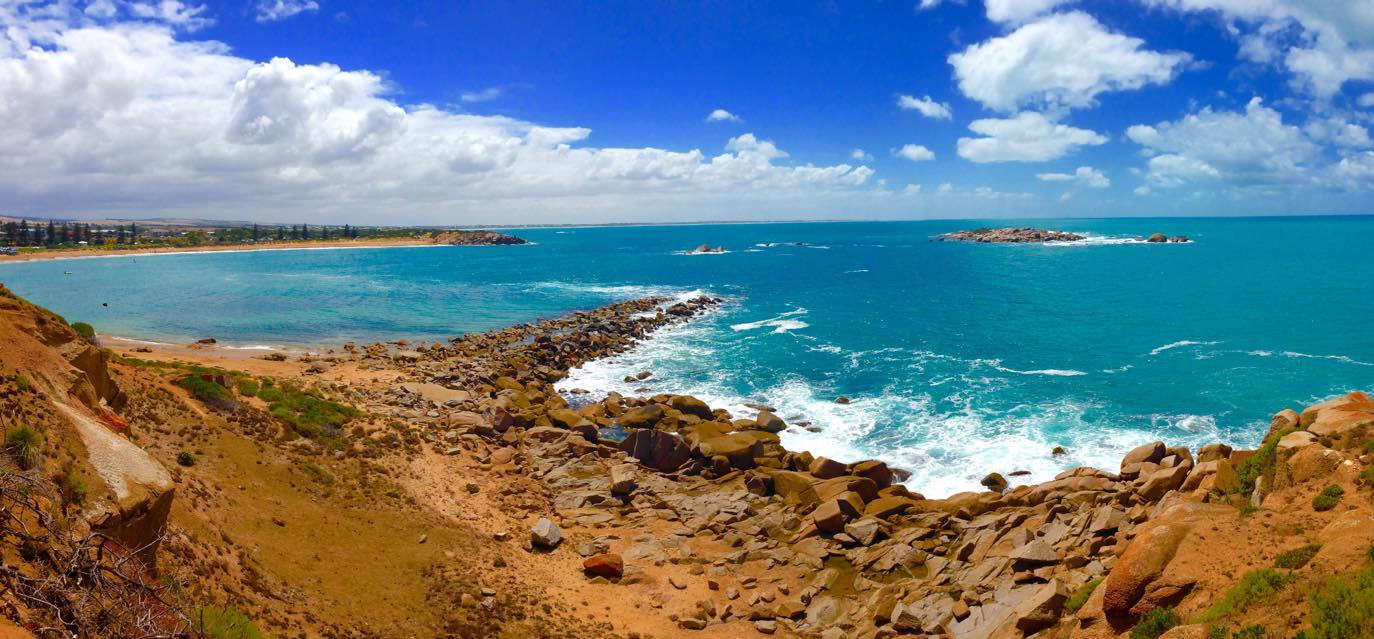
- Horseshoe Bay, the location of Ryan’s murder
- Date: 20 February 2007; 19 years ago
- Location: Lot 850 Basham Parade, Port Elliot, South Australia; 35°31′58″S 138°41′10″E
- Type: Murder by assault, suffocation, and drowning
- Motive: Failed attempt at sexual predation
- Deaths: Carly Ryan
- Convictions: Garry Francis Newman; Guilty of murder Newman's son Not guilty of all charges
- Sentence: Garry Newman; Life imprisonment with 29-year non-parole period

The autopsy revealed 19 separate injuries, with six to eight of them being blows to the head, and the cause of death was a combination of facial trauma, smothering, and drowning. It also revealed cannabinoids in Ryan's bloodstream and beach sand in her oesophagus. There was also evidence that she may have been sexually assaulted and had been redressed post assault.

Investigators examined security footage, which showed Ryan in and around Port Elliot on 19 February, in the company of two men, and she was last seen alive by witnesses at the beach at 9:30 PM. A pale blue vehicle used by the men led police to Mornington Peninsula, where a raid (11 days after the murder) led to the arrest of Newman, and the detention of Newman's younger son. At the time of his arrest, Newman was online messaging a 14-year old girl from Perth. A search of his computer revealed that Newman was still using the Kane identity. Further investigations revealed that Newman had kept a notebook detailing some 200 online personas, and other criminal attempts at grooming both in Australia and internationally. He had also used his son at times to impersonate Kane online to Ryan.

Garry Francis Newman
- Born: 1956 (age 69–70)
- Other name: Brandon Kane
- Known for: Murder of Carly Ryan, online catfishing
- Children: 3
- Status: Currently serving life sentence
- Conviction: Guilty
- Criminal charge: One count of murder
- Penalty: Life in prison with 29-year non-parole period

Details
- Victims: At least 2
- Country: Australia
- Date apprehended: 3 March 2007

At his trial, which ran from October 2009 to April 2010, Newman, who was initially not identified to the media, acted erratically and initially denied meeting the teenager. On 21 January 2010, Newman was sentenced to life imprisonment with a 29-year non-parole period. Newman's adopted son, who was a minor at the time and a witness to the killing, was cleared of all charges (due to a legal technicality) and his identity remains largely suppressed. In the years afterwards, the son, however, was later connected to 13 other charges related to the subsequent sexual assault of other minors.

== Reaction ==
After the trial, Sonya Ryan helped to set up The Carly Ryan Foundation (CRF) in 2010, a non-profit charity created to promote internet safety. In 2013, the foundation began lobbying for a legal change to improve the protection of minors online, particularly given the statistic that 25% of teenage Australians were being contacted online by people they do not know. The foundation also promoted safety awareness in Australia (in conjunction with the eSafety Commisioner) and New Zealand, such as the use of online contracts, and also in the US, and created a smartphone application called Thread as a personal safety app for children. Sonya Ryan also received a South Australian of the Year Award in 2013 for services to the community, as well as various other awards in 2017 and 2018 and a OAM in 2021. During the Covid pandemic, she relocated to the US where she continues her advocacy work.

== Legal changes ==
=== National ===
After a number of unsuccessful proposals by Senator Nick Xenophon's team, on 25 May 2017, a bill titled Criminal Code Amendment (Protecting Minors Online) Bill 2017 was submitted to the Parliament of Australia. The bill covered electronic means of communications (i.e., “carriage service”), defined in law as “a service for carrying communications by means of guided and/or unguided electromagnetic energy” such as telephones, faxes, video, computers, internet, or radio. The purpose of the bill was:

to introduce an offence to criminalise acts done using a carriage service to prepare or plan to cause harm to, procure, or engage in sexual activity with, a person under the age of 16. This expressly includes a person misrepresenting their age online as part of a plan to cause harm to another person under 16 years of age.

It proposed changes to three federal Australian laws: Criminal Code Act 1995; Crimes Act 1914; and, Telecommunications (Interception and Access) Act 1979. The amended bill was passed at the federal level and enacted into law on 23 June 2017.

=== South Australia ===
A similar, but tighter version of the law initially failed to pass the Legislative Council in South Australia in 2013. Later, following a petition, an amended bill was introduced by Attorney-General Vickie Chapman, and was passed by the Parliament of South Australia on 5 July 2018, which made it an offence for an adult (aged 18 or older) to lie to a child about their age or who they are and then attempt to meet that child. These amendments came into effect on 13 August 2018.

== See also ==
- Internet homicide
- Murder of Kacie Woody
- Alicia Kozakiewicz
