= George Weber (radio personality) =

American radio personality (1961–2009)

- Born: March 23, 1961; Philadelphia, Pennsylvania, U.S.
- Died: March 20, 2009 (aged 47); Brooklyn, New York, U.S.
- Presenting career
- Show: WABC 77
- Network: ABC Radio Network

George Weber (March 23, 1961 – March 20, 2009) was an American radio personality on the ABC Radio Network doing hourly news updates. For several years he was on the WABC 77 morning show, with Curtis Sliwa and Ron Kuby in New York City. He did periodic news updates throughout the morning, as well as joining in conversation with the hosts about those news stories. He was found stabbed to death in his home on March 20, 2009, at the age of 47.

== Career ==
Born in Philadelphia, Pennsylvania, Weber began his radio career at WBUX (AM) in Doylestown. He then went on to WAEB in Allentown, where he worked for two and a half years as a reporter and news anchor. After contacting Phil Boyce, then news director at Denver station KIMN, he received an offer to be a street reporter and anchor with that station. Two and a half years later (after KIMN's demise) Weber went to crosstown rival KOA, where he began a new career as the host of a night-time talk show. Some other important stops on his way to a full-time job with WABC were KGO, KOGO, KTLK, and KMPC. As a former tobacco user, he has been featured in radio advertisements for KickTheHabitNow.com.

Weber was fired by WABC at the same time as John R. Gambling in February 2008. Financial problems at ABC, coupled with the fact that ABC's new morning show Imus in the Morning had its own newsman, Charles McCord, led to his dismissal. In April 2008, Weber obtained a new assignment doing news updates for the ABC Radio Network.

Hey it's George Weber, the news guy. For more than a decade, I've been on the airwaves in New York city radio, most of that time at 77 WABC. Currently, I'm a radio anchor at ABC NEWS. I started in broadcasting at the tender young age of 16 at tiny WBUX in Doylestown, Pennyslvania. [sic] For the next 25 years, I hopscotched the country working at great radio stations like KIMN, KOA and KTLK in Denver, KMPC and KABC in Los Angeles, KGO in San Francisco and KOGO in San Diego. Depending on the day and the year, I was either doing talk radio or news. I love them both.

— George Weber, Personal Blog

== Personal life ==
A number of Weber's stories and investigations were based around experiences in his private life. He often reported about his neighborhood in New York and his two dogs featured in some of his stories. The last story on his website was published on the same day he died, March 20, 2009, and described an outbreak of bed bugs around his Carroll Gardens neighborhood.

Extract from letter to dog Noodles after death of his other dog Romer:
Don't bite me, Noodles, if I hug you a little more these days or if I squeeze you too tight. That's how humans show how much we love each other and comfort each other in times of grief. And someday when you get old and frail, like Romer, I promise I will be by your side in the autumn of your life. You won't be as playful or agile but you will be wiser in your elder years. You'll be able to reflect on all the things you learned, all the friends you made and most of all, little buddy, you will continue to be my best friend well after you take your last nap. I Love You. Daddy.

— George Weber, Official website

== Murder ==
On Friday, March 20, 2009, George Weber was killed in his Brooklyn apartment on Henry Street in Carroll Gardens, Brooklyn. A co-worker became concerned when he didn't show up for work on Saturday, so police were dispatched to Weber's apartment on Sunday at 12:30am, but they noticed nothing amiss, and left. When the co-worker called again at 8:30 a.m., police returned to the building, where a neighbor said he heard water running in the newsman's apartment all night. Police entered the apartment and discovered Weber's body, with his hands and feet bound. Weber had been stabbed more than 50 times in the neck, chest and arms, and his guest bedroom had been ransacked. The water was still running in the apartment's bathtub and kitchen sink, and investigators believe Weber's killer used the water to clean himself after the murder. Authorities said there was no sign of forced entry.

On March 25, police arrested 16-year-old student John Katehis of East Elmhurst, Queens, New York for the murder. He was lured to a rendezvous with detectives by his father, who promised to give him $300, and was arrested without incident. Katehis confessed to the crime when apprehended, also claiming to be a Satanist and a sadomasochist. Katehis told police that he and Weber had met through a personal ad Weber had posted on Craigslist for "rough sex," but stabbed Weber in self-defense after Weber tried to stab him. This led to the media referring to Katehis as a Craigslist killer.

Katehis was charged as an adult with second-degree murder and criminal possession of a weapon, and pleaded not guilty, despite his confession. Katehis's lawyer claimed there was an ongoing relationship between Weber and Katehis. Following a mistrial, Katehis was convicted in 2011 at retrial, and sentenced to 25 years to life. Author David McConnell, in his book American Honor Killings: Desire and Rage Among Men explored the Katehis case as a main example of lethal hate crimes on homosexual men where the perpetrators exhibited some degree of homosexuality themselves.

== See also ==
- Internet homicide
- Lonely hearts killer
