= Suicide pact =

Agreement between multiple individuals to die by suicide

A suicide pact is an agreed plan between two or more individuals to die by suicide. The plan may be to die together, or separately and closely timed.

In England and Wales, a suicide pact is a partial defense, under section 4 of the Homicide Act 1957, which reduces the charge of murder to manslaughter. In Northern Ireland, this defense is created by section 14 of the Criminal Justice Act (Northern Ireland) 1966 (c. 20) (N.I.).

== General considerations ==
Suicide pacts are an important concept in the study of suicide, and have occurred throughout history, as well as in fiction. An example of this is the suicide pact between Rudolf, Crown Prince of Austria and Baroness Mary Vetsera.

Suicide pacts are sometimes contrasted with mass suicides, understood as incidents in which a larger number of people kill themselves together for the same ideological reason, often within a religious, political, military or paramilitary context. "Suicide pact" tends to connote small groups and non-ideological motivations, as do bonding as married or romantic partners, as family members or friends, or even as criminal partners.

=== Legal aspects ===
In England and Wales, suicide pact is a partial defense, under section 4 of the Homicide Act 1957, which reduces murder to manslaughter. In Northern Ireland, this defense is created by section 14 of the Criminal Justice Act (Northern Ireland) 1966 (c. 20) (N.I.).

==== Regional considerations ====
One of the first Internet suicides in Israel occurred in 1997, when Eran Aderet, a 19-year-old soldier, died after expressing a desire to kill himself online, and received detailed instructions on how to accomplish this with an M16 rifle in his possession. Following this case, in 1999, a new Israeli association, SAHAR, sought to prevent suicide by providing supportive conversations and referrals to relevant resources. In 2005, following an increase in the number of Internet suicide cases, the police established a special unit which consists of six police officers and specializes in helping people who communicate online that they want to die by suicide. The unit keeps in contact with forum moderators, who are asked to look out for posts from suicidal users. About 200 cases are detected each year, preventing dozens of suicides.

Following the success of the Israeli model, similar units have been founded in Sweden, Germany and France.

==== Background ====
Although the majority of such Internet-related suicide pacts have occurred in Japan, where it takes the name of netto shinjū (ネット心中), similar incidents have also been reported from other countries including China, South Korea, Germany, Australia, Norway, the United Kingdom, Canada and the United States.

==== Internet suicide pacts ====
The first known Internet-related suicide pact occurred in February 2000, when a Norwegian man and Austrian woman plunged 300 metres down the famous cliff Preikestolen, in Rogaland county, Norway. Later, a Norwegian woman came forward stating that the Norwegian man had met her on an Internet forum, and planned to die by suicide with her too, but he had instead chosen to go with the Austrian woman. Both victims were in their 20s.

Despite the alarmed response of the media, Internet-connected suicide pacts are still relatively rare. Even in Japan, where most of such pacts have occurred, they still represent only 2% of all group suicide-pacts, and less than 0.01% of all suicides combined. However, they have been increasing in the country: 34 deaths from such pacts occurred in 2003; at least 50 are estimated to have occurred in 2004; and 91 deaths occurred in 2005. One notable example would be Hiroshi Maeue, who on March 28, 2007, was sentenced to death by hanging, alleged to have murdered three participants in a suicide pact.

An article published in the British Medical Journal in December 2004, by Sundararajan Rajagopal, Consultant Psychiatrist from St. Thomas' Hospital in London, highlighted the emergence of the relatively new phenomenon of cybersuicide pacts, addressing it from a psychiatric perspective. Rajagopal commented "The recent suicide pacts in Japan might just be isolated events in a country that has even previously been shown to have the highest rate of suicide pacts. Alternatively, they might herald a new disturbing trend in suicide pacts, with more such incidents, involving strangers meeting over the Internet, becoming increasingly common. If the latter is the case then the epidemiology of suicide pacts is likely to change, with more young people living on their own, who may have died by suicide alone, joining with like-minded suicidal persons to die together".

An article published by the Canterbury Suicide Project makes some notable comparisons between the nature of "traditional" suicide pacts and more recent Internet-related suicide pacts (or, as described in the article, "cyber-based suicide pacts"). It points out that traditionally suicide pacts:

- have been extremely rare;
- involve older individuals (50–60 years old) and very few adolescents;
- tend to be between individuals with family or marriage-type relationships and differing, but complementary, psychiatric pathologies.

On the other hand, Internet-related suicide pacts are almost the exact opposite:

- They involve young people almost exclusively.
- The participants tend to be complete strangers or platonic friends.
- The common characteristic among them would seem to be clinical depression.

The article also points out that the trend of Internet-related suicide pacts is changing the way that mental-health workers need to deal with depressed and/or suicidal young people, advising that it is "prudent for clinicians to ask routinely if young people have been accessing Internet sites, obtaining suicide information from such sites, and talking in suicide chat rooms".

A person who enters into an Internet suicide pact can also be lying intentionally. American nurse William Melchert-Dinkel is an example of a person who made multiple Internet suicide pacts, in which he falsely promised to hang himself after the other person died by suicide. Melchert-Dinkel was later convicted of criminally assisting or attempting to assist in two suicides by providing detailed information about a suicide method.

== See also ==
- Copycat suicide
- Homicide Act 1957, which stated homicide due to suicide pact is manslaughter
- Internet homicide
- Lover's Leap
- Right to die
- Shinjū
- Social media and suicide
- Suicide and the Internet
- Suicide prevention contract, the agreement not to die by suicide
- "The Constitution is not a suicide pact," a recurring concept in American jurisprudence
- Yanaka Five-Storied Pagoda Double-Suicide Arson Case
- The Love Suicides at Sonezaki (1978 film)
- The Virgin Suicides
