= Klaus Michael Beier =

German physician, psychotherapist and sexologist

Klaus Michael Beier (born 1961) is a German physician, psychotherapist and sexologist. He is director of the Institute for sexology and sexual medicine at the Charité - Universitätsmedizin in Berlin.

== Life ==
Klaus Michael Beier began studying medicine in 1979 and philosophy at the Free University of Berlin in 1980. He received his doctorate in medicine in 1986 and two years later in philosophy. In 1988 he became a scientific assistant at the Research and Counselling Centre for Sexual Medicine of the University Hospital in Kiel. There he habilitated in 1994 in sexual medicine and in 1995 was appointed to the Charité - Universitätsmedizin Berlin, at that time a medical faculty of the Humboldt University Berlin. He is a specialist in psychosomatic medicine, has additional academic licences for psychotherapy, psychoanalysis and sexual medicine and has been director of the newly founded Institute for Sexology and Sexual Medicine at the Charité since 1996. In teaching, he represents sexology on an interdisciplinary scale (lectures for students in humanities and social sciences) and sexual medicine in medical school studies. In 2017, he was awarded the Cross of Merit from the Federal Republic of Germany for his achievements in the field of sexology and for his commitment to the prevention of child sexual abuse.

Beier's commitment to the prevention of child sexual abuse was largely based on his follow-up examinations of formerly assessed sex offenders, making it possible to assess and make predictions about different "offender types" and revealed the significantly higher risk of recidivism among men with pedophilic sexual preference compared to offenders who are not sexually inclined towards children, but who nevertheless sexually abuse children for various reasons. The term "dissexuality" was coined in this context to define sexual behaviour disorders as a failure to conform to social norms in terms of respecting the sexual integrity of others which highlights the fact that most offences are not known to the justice system, but nevertheless have the same negative consequences for the victims.

Another focus of Beier's work is the development of the Syndyastic Sexual Therapy together with the Austrian sexologist Kurt Loewit. It focuses on the attachment dimension of sexuality and the fulfilment of basic needs in terms of closeness, acceptance, security, trust and acceptance by the partner.

By systematically presenting the subject of sexual medicine and its curricular implementation in corresponding upgrade training courses, Beier was successful in establishing the additional title/degree ‘sexual medicine’ in the official training regulations of the Berlin Medical Association in 2007 and, recently, the German Medical Association (2018).

== See also ==
- Charité (university hospital)
- Sexology
- Prevention Project Dunkelfeld
- Primary prevention of child sexual abuse

== Publications ==
- Beier, K.M. (1994) Weiblichkeit und Perversion: Von der Reproduktion zur Reproversion. Stuttgart, Jena: G. Fischer.
- Beier, K. M. (1995) Dissexualität im Lebenslängsschnitt. Theoretische und empirische Untersuchungen zu Phänomenologie und Prognose begutachteter Sexualstraftäter. Heidelberg: Springer.
- Beier, K.M. (2007) Sexueller Kannibalismus. Sexualwissenschaftliche Analyse der Anthropophagie. Elsevier, München u.a.
- Beier, K. M. (2012) "Sexualität und Geschlechtsidentität – Entwicklung und Störungen". In J. M. Fegert, J. M. Eggers & F. Resch (Hrsg.), Psychiatrie und Psychotherapie des Kindes- und Jugendalters (S. 735–785). Heidelberg: Springer.
- Beier, K.M. (2018) Pädophilie, Hebephilie und sexueller Kindesmissbrauch. Springer, Berlin u.a.
- Beier, K.M, Loewit, K. (2004) Lust in Beziehung. Einführung in die Syndyastische Sexualtherapie. Springer, Heidelberg
- Beier, K. M., Bosinski, H. A. G., Loewit, K. (2005). Sexualmedizin: Grundlagen und Praxis (2. Aufl.). München: Elsevier, Urban und Fischer.
- Beier, K. M., Loewit, K. (2011). Praxisleitfaden Sexualmedizin. Von der Theorie zur Therapie. Berlin, Heidelberg: Springer.
