= Hiroshi Maeue =

Japanese serial killer (1968–2009)

- Born: Hiroshi Maeue; August 8, 1968; Osaka Prefecture, Japan
- Died: July 28, 2009 (aged 40); Osaka Detention House, Osaka, Japan
- Cause of death: Execution by hanging
- Other name: The Suicide Website Murderer
- Motive: Paraphilia
- Conviction: Murder (3 counts)
- Penalty: Death

Details
- Victims: 3
- Span of crimes: February 19 – June 10, 2005
- Country: Japan
- States: Osaka, Osaka Prefecture
- Date apprehended: August 8, 2005

Hiroshi Maeue (前上 博, Maeue Hiroshi; August 8, 1968 – July 28, 2009) was a Japanese serial killer who lured his victims via the internet and killed three people in 2005. Also known as the "Suicide Website Murderer", Maeue suffered from a paraphilic psychosexual disorder that translated into being unable to achieve sexual release in the absence of performing an act of strangulation.

== Earlier crimes ==
Maeue attended the Kanazawa Institute of Technology, where in 1988 he attempted to strangle a male friend, resulting in him dropping out. In 1995, he was arrested and charged with assault after beating and attempting to asphyxiate a male work associate. After settling out of court, he was released and fired from his job. In 2001, he was arrested once more for the attempted strangling of two women and sentenced to a year in prison and 3 years of suspended sentence. After being released early on good behavior, he was arrested yet again in 2002 for attempting to strangle a junior high school boy, for which he was sentenced to 22 months in prison.

== Suicide website murders ==
In 2005, soon after his release from prison, he murdered three people. He was convicted of killing a 14-year-old boy, a 25-year-old woman, and a 21-year-old man, all of whom were members of an online suicide club. He lured his victims by suggesting they meet and end their lives together by committing suicide via carbon monoxide poisoning using a charcoal burner in a sealed car. However, after a brief conversation, he would instead strangle them. He later said that the murders gave him sexual pleasure, and claimed he developed a desire to kill this way after reading about similar events in a mystery novel as a child.

== Trial and death ==
In his trial, prosecutors called Maeue a "lust murderer". On March 28, 2007, the Osaka District Court sentenced him to death. Although his defense team launched an appeal, he accepted the judgment of the court and expressed a willingness to pay for his crimes with his life, retracting his appeal on July 5, 2007.

On July 28, 2009, Maeue was hanged in Osaka, along with 25-year-old serial killer Yukio Yamaji.

== See also ==
- Erotic asphyxiation
- Internet homicide
- List of executions in Japan
- List of serial killers by country
- Volunteer (capital punishment)
