= Murder of Sonia Exelby =

2025 killing in Marion County, Florida, US

- Exelby in 2024
- Location: Marion County, Florida, US
- Date: 12 October 2025
- Victim: Sonia Exelby
- Accused: Dwain Chadwick Hall
- Charges: First-degree murder and kidnapping; Fraudulent use of a credit card and unlawful use of a two-way communication device

On 17 October 2025, Sonia Exelby (born July 22, 1993), a 32-year-old British woman from Portsmouth, was found dead in a shallow grave in Marion County, Florida, after travelling to the United States to meet Dwain Chadwick Hall (born January 31, 1972), a 53-year-old man she had communicated with online. An autopsy found that she had died from stab wounds.

Hall was subsequently charged with first-degree murder and kidnapping. He pleaded not guilty, and his trial began in November 2026. He was convicted on 20 November.

== Background ==
Sonia Exelby was the youngest of six children and was known in her family as "Lamby". Her mother struggled with the demands of caring for a large family, and much of her early care was taken on by an eight‑year‑old sister, Gemma. When Exelby was one year old, she and her four‑year‑old sister, Sara, were placed in foster care and later adopted by a civil servant and his wife in Portchester, Hampshire. She grew up in a stable home and developed an interest in music through her paternal grandparents, learning guitar, piano and flute. Aged around 18, Exelby began to take an interest in her biological family. She and Sara later reconnected with Gemma, their three older brothers, and their birth mother.

Exelby attended South Downs College in Waterlooville for sixth form. Her family later said she experienced depression and difficulties with body image, briefly attended university, and had a history of eating disorders, including using unregulated diet pills purchased online. During her 20s, Exelby's mental health declined and her eating disorders worsened. She became reclusive and relied on video games and online communication for company. Her family said that invitations to spend time together were often met with silence. Sara, who lived in Australia, returned regularly and later described a marked change in Exelby's behaviour, noting her reluctance to leave her home and her increasing isolation.

By 2023, Exelby was detached from friends and family. Her relatives said she had expressed suicidal thoughts and had visited online suicide forums. She also created an account on Motherless.com, a hardcore fetish pornography website, using the username "Already Yours". In November 2023, Exelby told her siblings she had come across a website that, she said, involved a group of American men killing vulnerable women. She said she planned to travel to the United States to expose it. Her family contacted Hampshire and Isle of Wight Constabulary out of concern for her safety. A later examination of Exelby's phone and laptop showed that her actual intention had been to travel to the United States to be voluntarily tortured and killed by individuals she had been communicating with online. She had exchanged violent and suicidal messages on Motherless and had been in contact with a user known as "alphasadist", later identified as Dwain Chadwick Hall.

== Killing ==
=== Contact with Hall and travel to Florida ===
Exelby came into contact with Hall, who was 53 and married with a stepson, through a hardcore fetish pornography website. He had previous arrests in Florida for escape from custody and trespass. He later told investigators that their communication began through comments on his posts and developed into regular contact. Over the following two years, he described himself as acting as a "mentor" to Exelby, saying he offered guidance and daily routines and alleging that she had told him this had improved her life.

Exelby's siblings said this period coincided with a marked decline in her wellbeing and increasing isolation. Police records state that by 5 August 2024 she had used the encrypted messaging service Telegram to arrange travel to the United States to meet men she believed would help her act on fantasies of being "violently killed". A friend alerted authorities, and Hampshire and Isle of Wight Constabulary intervened. Officers examined her devices, shared relevant information with US authorities and took safeguarding measures, including removing her phone and laptop. Police said no criminal offences had been identified and no arrests were made.

In early 2025, Exelby and Hall discussed plans for her to visit him near Ocala, Florida, but he later cancelled. Around this time, they spoke by phone for the first time. Hall later told investigators he owed money to the Internal Revenue Service, and Exelby offered to contribute $4,000 towards the debt if he helped her, in his words, remove the "trappings of humanity".

=== Arrival in Florida ===
Exelby and Hall arranged to spend a weekend together in an isolated two‑bedroom Airbnb near Reddick, Florida. Using a laptop she had obtained without her family's knowledge, she paid for the accommodation and booked a flight from London Heathrow Airport to Gainesville Regional Airport for the evening of 10 October 2025, with a return flight scheduled for 13 October. Exelby told her boyfriend that she would be staying with her sisters that weekend, using a planned visit by one of them as an explanation for her absence. She had previously reassured her family that she did not intend to act on her fantasies and had ended contact with those she had been speaking to online. On the morning of 10 October, she packed a small bag and left her home in Southsea.

Shortly before collecting her from the airport, Hall purchased items including a shovel, rope and gun‑cleaning supplies. He picked her up outside the terminal and drove her to the Airbnb.

=== Events inside the Airbnb ===
On 11 October, Hall recorded a video in which he asked Exelby why she was there. She replied, "Because I'm an awful person". Detectives said he directed her to demean herself during the recording, and noted that she appeared dishevelled with visible bruising and was reluctant to respond. Hall deleted the video shortly after filming it, but investigators later recovered it from his phone. Later that afternoon, he attempted several times to transfer money from Exelby's bank card into his business account, and after repeated failed attempts, he withdrew $1,200 from her debit card.

According to messages later recovered by police, Exelby contacted an online acquaintance to say that Hall had taken her phone, that she felt unable to leave, and that he had told her she would have to shoot him if she wanted to escape. She said she was frightened, in pain and unable to get a signal, and described the first evening in the Airbnb as "so bad". She also wrote that Hall had shown her how to use a firearm and where to aim it. She ended the message by saying, "My time's up".

=== Final movements ===
On 12 October, Hall left the Airbnb and drove south towards Ocala, where he bought a plastic tarpaulin from a store. CCTV footage appeared to show him speaking to someone in the passenger seat before he went inside. Around the same time, the owner of the rented property received a notification indicating that the guests had checked out. Investigators later established that Hall then drove to a location beside woodland, and GPS data from his phone showed that he remained at the site for about an hour.

== Investigation ==
Exelby's family reported her missing on 12 October, and Hampshire and Isle of Wight Constabulary began an inquiry. On 13 October, the Florida Department of Law Enforcement (FDLE) received a request from UK authorities to assist in locating her. Investigators linked Hall to Exelby through transactions made on her bank cards to his roadside assistance business. When contacted by FDLE, Hall said that she had telephoned him about a tyre change but that her payment had been declined. The next day, he sent a package containing a knife, its sheath and a bracelet to a friend in Ohio.

On 15 October, officers searched the Airbnb and found receipts for items Hall had bought. Based on this information, Hall was stopped while driving and taken to the Marion County Sheriff's Office for questioning. During the interview, he gave a series of false accounts, including allegations that he had been hired by a man known as "Harold". After several hours, Hall retracted his earlier accounts and said he had accepted financial help from Exelby in exchange for assisting her to die. He also told detectives that the pair had "rough sex".

On 17 October, police search teams found Exelby's body in a shallow grave at the same location where Hall's GPS data placed him in Marion County. An autopsy recorded four stab wounds, and her blood was found on a customised steel knife belonging to Hall. Exelby's belongings were later recovered from a public clothing bin 46 miles away in Gainesville. A search of his home recovered the shovel he had bought earlier in the weekend, with both his and Exelby's DNA on it. Hall was charged with first‑degree murder and kidnapping, having already been charged with fraudulent use of a credit card and unlawful use of a two‑way communication device. He pleaded not guilty.

== Trial ==
Hall's trial began on 17 November 2026, with the prosecution alleging in its opening statement that he had manipulated Exelby over several years and exploited her mental health problems. Exelby's fiancé testified that she had regularly self-harmed and had attempted suicide twice. He also said that he had taken away her passport for several months because of concerns that she might leave the country, but later returned it after believing that she had stopped using the fetish websites. On 20 November, Hall was found guilty of first-degree murder and kidnapping and sentenced to life imprisonment.
