= Trampling (sexual practice) =

Sexual activity involving one person stepping on another

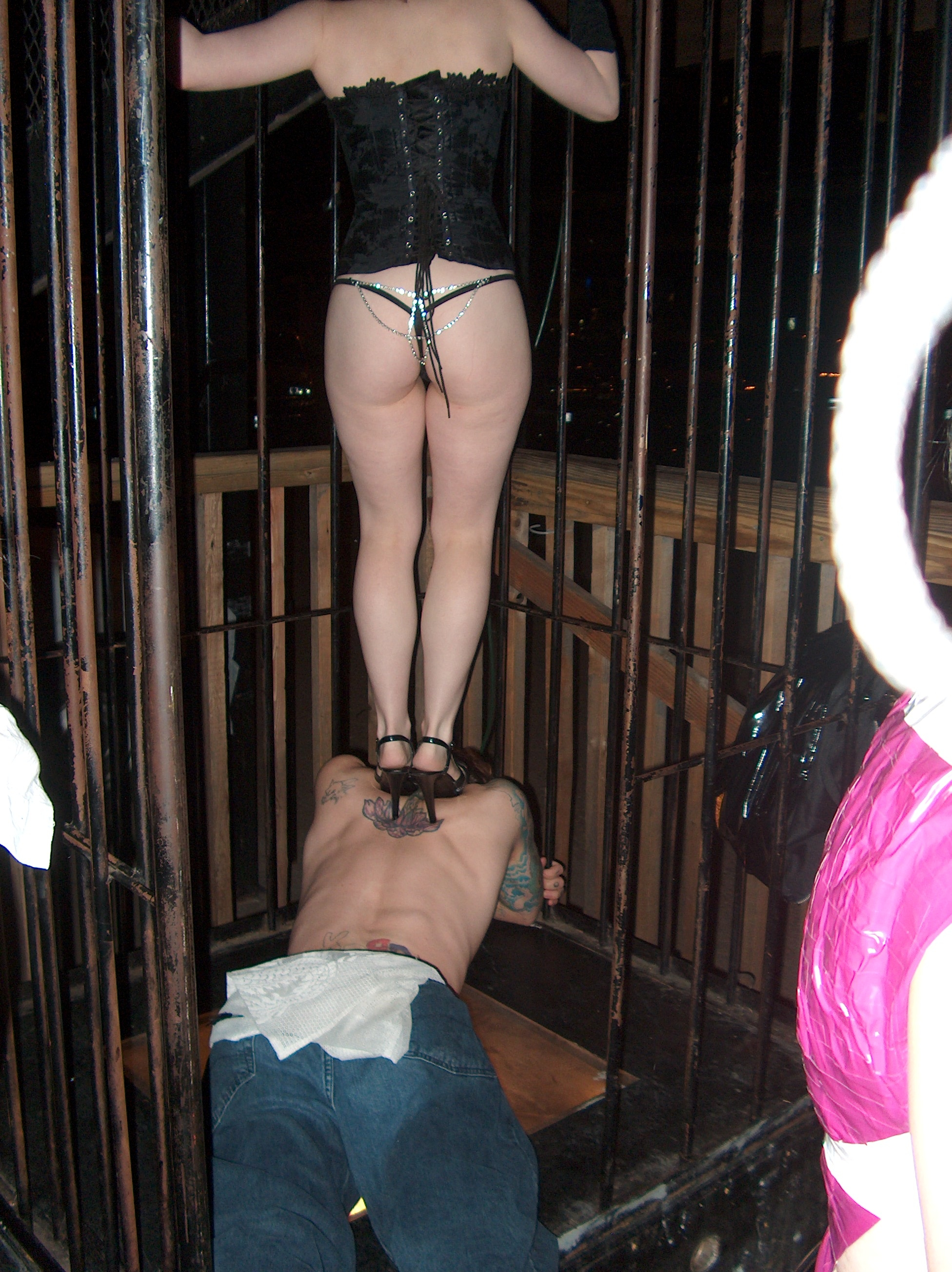
A dominatrix performing trampling on a submissive man. The woman is standing with both feet on the man's back.

Trampling is a sexual activity and fetish in which one person is stepped on or trampled underfoot by another person or persons. The practice is sometimes associated with foot fetishism.

Because trampling can be used to produce pain and intense sensation, it often overlaps with BDSM—especially sadomasochism.

== Practices ==
Trampling scenarios typically involve a submissive partner lying on the floor while a dominant partner walks, stands, or occasionally jumps on the body. The goal is the application of weight, physically pressuring the submissive partner. Common targets are the back and chest; footwear and intensity vary from barefoot or socks to shoes and, in some cases, high heels. Scenes may include elements of humiliation (e.g., being used as a “human carpet”) or foot worship, depending on participants’ preferences.

== Psychology and sociology ==
Reported motives include masochistic enjoyment of pressure and pain, erotic focus on feet or footwear, and dominance–submission dynamics (the trampler’s physical “power over” and the tramplee’s submission). Media accounts describe long-standing subcultural figures who present as “human carpets” in nightlife contexts, illustrating how the practice can intersect with performance or identity beyond private sexual settings.

== Related practices and distinctions ==
- Foot/shoe fetishism: Trampling frequently overlaps with foot fetishism and shoe/boot domination because the foot (or footwear) is the instrument of action.
- Macrophilia: Sometimes confused with trampling, macrophilia involves fantasies of extreme size differences (e.g., a giant/giantess stepping on a tiny person) and is primarily a fantasy/role-play genre rather than the physical practice of trampling.
- Crush fetish: Distinct from trampling. Crush fetish focuses on arousal from the crushing of objects or animals; commercial animal crush videos are illegal in several jurisdictions (see Legal issues).

== Safety ==
Medical risk depends on weight distribution, footwear, target areas, and the quantity and rate of force. Concentrated force—such as the tip of a stiletto heel on the chest or abdomen—can fracture ribs or damage internal organs; rare but severe outcomes (including organ rupture) are medically plausible with blunt chest/abdominal trauma. BDSM harm-reduction typically emphasizes negotiation, safe words, gradual intensity, stable footing, and avoiding high-risk areas (throat, face, lower ribs, and abdomen).

== Legal issues ==
Between consenting adults, trampling is generally lawful; however, activities that are non-consensual or involve minors or animals are criminal. In the United States, after the Supreme Court decision United States v. Stevens (2010) struck down an earlier, overbroad statute on depictions of animal cruelty, Congress enacted the Animal Crush Video Prohibition Act of 2010 (Pub. L. 111-294), which narrowly bans creation and commercial distribution of animal crush videos and has been upheld by federal courts.

== In popular culture and media ==
Media have periodically profiled nightlife figures who act as “human carpets,” inviting others to step on them—sometimes framed as performance art rather than sexual practice. Viral debates about consent and safety recur when such performances occur in public spaces. A 2006 long-form feature also reported on a fatality linked to extreme crush/trample fantasies, highlighting the dangers of lethal methods (e.g., involving vehicles).

== See also ==
- BDSM
- Foot fetishism
- Shoe fetishism
- Macrophilia
- Crush fetish
- Erotic humiliation
