= Foot play =

Footplay can refer to:

- Footsies, a form of flirtation
- Foot fetishism, sexual fetishism
- Figures of Argentine tango § Foot play, steps that spice up the walk and the dance

== See also ==
- Footwork (disambiguation)
