= Saeko: Giantess Dating Sim =

2025 video game

- Promotional art depicting Saeko
- Developer: Safe Havn
- Publisher: Hyper Real
- Director: kyp (Note: kyp also serves as the writer, programmer, composer, and one of two graphic artists on the game.)
- Designer: maztani
- Artists: koh; kyp
- Engine: Ebitengine
- Platforms: Microsoft Windows; Linux; Nintendo Switch
- Release: May 29, 2025: Windows, Linux; WW: May 29, 2025; Nintendo Switch; WW: June 25, 2026
- Genres: Adventure, visual novel
- Mode: Single-player

Saeko: Giantess Dating Sim, (Note: often stylized as "SAEKO: Giantess Dating Sim", with "Saeko" in all caps) also known as simply Saeko, is a Japanese adventure video game developed by Safe Havn Studio and published by Hyper Real. It was released for Microsoft Windows and Linux on May 29, 2025. The game's narrative centers around Saeko, a young woman with the magical ability to shrink others, who secretly uses her powers to kidnap and eat people. Players take the role of Rin, one of Saeko's kidnapping victims, as he manages the condition of Saeko's other shrunken captives and develops a relationship with her.

== Gameplay ==
Saeko: Giantess Dating Sim is an adventure and visual novel horror game. The player assumes the role of Rin, a young androgynous man who has been shrunk down to about the size of a thumb and kidnapped by Saeko, a female university student with mysterious magical powers. He is kept with other shrunken people whom Saeko kidnapped inside a desk drawer, which serves as the game's primary setting.

"Day" gameplay of Saeko, showing the interior of the desk drawer in which the game is primarily set. The player selects a peanut to feed to Moko, a non-playable character. Doing so will raise Moko's "Appeal", making her Saeko's next victim.

Saeko takes place over a single in-game week, which is divided into "day" and "night" sections. During the "day" sections of the game, Rin interacts with the other shrunken people trapped inside Saeko's desk drawer. At the end of each day, Rin must choose one of the shrunken people to sacrifice to Saeko. By feeding the player's chosen victim with food found in the drawer, Rin raises their "Appeal" stat, thus making them look more appetizing to Saeko, who will subsequently eat them. Should the player fail to choose a sacrifice for Saeko before she returns to the drawer, she will become angered and kill everyone inside, ending the game.

"Night" gameplay of Saeko, showing the real-time dialogue system. The player disagrees with Saeko's opinion, resulting in a failure state as Saeko crushes Rin.

During the "night" sections, Rin converses with Saeko in a dialogue sequence that progresses in real time, during which the player must select the correct answers in the time allotted. If the player selects an incorrect answer, takes too long to respond, or responds too frequently, Saeko becomes irritated and kills Rin, resulting in a game over.

After speaking to Saeko, the game progresses to a "midnight" section, where Rin is shown using a feature phone. During this section, the player may save the game and may also use the phone to access news related to the story's events, a web novel, and a minigame.

== Plot ==
In Japan, during October 2008, Rin awakens in Saeko's home, finding himself shrunk and suffering from amnesia. Saeko, a giantess from Rin's perspective, says that she found him shrunken outside and brought him home to protect him. Saeko claims that she does not know how Rin shrank but will help restore him to his original size, and that he can stay with her until then. She leaves him in her desk drawer with other shrunken people while she goes to her classes.

Rin greets the small people, including Taki, the "supervisor" of the drawer, Chio, an aloof girl who comes onto Rin, and Moko, a doujinshi artist who expresses perverted sexual desires for Saeko and Rin. Finding Moko's behavior unpleasant, Taki forces her to eat a peanut. Saeko returns home, and, to Rin's surprise, swallows Moko alive and whole. Irritated at Taki for not explaining the truth to Rin as she had requested, she kills him by crushing him in her hand.

Chio later explains that eating the peanut made Moko more appealing to Saeko and that she had actually shrunk Rin and the others. Saeko regularly shrinks people and then eats them, killing them by digestion. She designated Rin as Taki's successor to the "supervisor" position. Every day, Saeko brings new people to the drawer, and Rin is required to choose someone to feed her.

A week passes, and Saeko continues eating the shrunken people Rin feeds her daily. She and Rin emotionally bond with one another. Meanwhile, Clara Kotobishi, a socialite and Rin's ex-girlfriend, returns to Japan to find that Rin has gone missing. Clara extensively searches for Rin, using the resources of her family's conglomerate. Saeko locates and shrinks Clara and brings her to the drawer. Clara's high-profile disappearance escalates the police's investigation of the string of unsolved missing persons cases caused by Saeko's killings over the years. Saeko is spotted at the scene, drawing suspicion. She is named the primary suspect in the case, and the police prepare to apprehend her.

Clara is shocked and appalled by Saeko's crimes and attempts to fight her, but her efforts prove useless, and she is killed. After killing Clara, Saeko takes Rin out to watch the ocean with her and asks if Rin enjoyed feeding people to Saeko.

Depending on the player's previous actions and dialogue choices, Rin may either approve of Saeko, or rebuke her for her murders. In the former case, Saeko confesses that Rin lived in the drawer prior to the week's beginning, and had in that time grown to love her. His affection had made Saeko uncomfortable, and so she used her powers to erase his memories. Saeko realizes that Rin still loves her even after losing his memories, and, touched, promises to never again lose faith in him. She restores Rin to his normal size, and he crushes the remaining shrunken people in the drawer. Saeko then uses her powers to grow herself and Rin to giant size, and they share an intimate moment as they destroy the city together.

If Rin admonishes Saeko for her crimes, she becomes remorseful and depressed. She restores her remaining shrunken captives to their normal size and then shrinks herself. She instructs Rin to kill her, preferring to die rather than face punishment for her crimes. In one ending, Rin does so, and the truth of Saeko's murders is exposed in the media. Some months later, Rin is in his apartment, keeping a drawer full of peanuts on which he has drawn faces to make them look like shrunken people. Alternatively, Rin may instead secretly keep Saeko alive, still shrunk, in his drawer.

== Development ==
Saeko: Giantess Dating Sim is developed by the Japan-based Safe Havn Studio, which consists of three members, led by kyp, the writer, director, and composer for the game. The members are graduates of Kyoto University, where they initially met. Although he had created games before Saeko as school projects, kyp was inspired to pursue game development professionally after playing the game VA-11 Hall-A. kyp chose the giantess theme for the game as he had long been a fan of web fiction about giantesses, and felt that making a game based on them would be interesting. kyp began development of Saeko as a solo project and initially focused on satisfying his interests in the giantess kink, but as the team expanded, development moved in the direction of appealing to a more general audience. kyp cited Milk Inside a Bag of Milk Inside a Bag of Milk and VA-11 Hall-A as inspirations for the game's pixel art visual style, and described the soundtrack as a mix of lo-fi and breakcore. He described Saeko as his "re-imagining" of what he felt to be the "great pioneering works" of internet culture, including 2000s web novels, "introspective" indie games on itch.io, and Bandcamp music.

According to kyp, Saeko was initially conceived in 2022, and Safe Havn began work on the game in April 2023. The game's narrative is based on the web novel "Saeko's Week" (冴子の一週間, Saeko no Isshūkan) by writer Shizue Fueti, which was posted on the giantess fetish website G-Fork. kyp first discovered the novel in the 2010s in junior high school, and greatly enjoyed it. Before developing Saeko, he contacted Shizue Fueti to ask if he could create a game based on the novel, and was granted permission to do so. The novel's central character, also named Saeko, is depicted as a junior high school student kidnapping her shrunken classmates. Although the novel is a sexually explicit fetish story, Saeko is not an adult game and does not feature any explicit sexual content.

In June 2023, the team chose to work with their publisher, Hyper Real, after being approached by them at the Tokyo Indies gathering of independent game developers. Saeko was announced that month by Hyper Real for release on Steam in 2024. The game was showcased at Tokyo Game Show in 2023, and again in 2024, when it was chosen to be displayed at the convention's "Selected Indie 80" exhibit. On June 10, 2023, a game demo was released to coincide with Steam Next Fest. On December 10, 2024, Safe Havn announced it had delayed the game's release to 2025. On May 1, 2025, a release date of May 29 was announced.

== Release ==
The game was released on May 29, 2025, on the DLsite and Stove store platforms for Microsoft Windows and Linux. A spin-off ASMR audio drama was also released and included for free with DLsite game purchases. The Steam version was delayed due to issues in the review process related to the game's content, and was ultimately released a day later, on May 30. A Nintendo Switch port is scheduled to be released on June 25, 2026.

== Reception ==
Reception

Review score
Publication	Score
IGN Japan	7/10

Before the game's release, Verity Townsend of Automaton West called Saeko's art "distinctive" and its premise "unusual", and noted that a tweet promoting the game had received thousands of interactions, evidencing the popularity of its premise. She described the demo as intriguing and bizarre, saying she expected the final game would be "likely to have plenty to keep fans of unconventional story-driven games happy."

Ana Valens of Vice described Saeko's premise as "a fantastic subversion of the dating sim genre" and expressed excitement about its release. Valens also commented on the game's relationship to the macrophilia community, noting that although Saeko uses tropes commonly found in giantess fetish material, the focus on its narrative and the horror tone made it potentially appealing to those who did not share the fetish.

Nomura Hikaru of IGN Japan gave Saeko a positive review, praising the pixel art, soundtrack, replay value offered by the differing narrative choices, and the intensity of the game's psychological horror elements, which they said evoked the metafictional horror of bishōjo games popularized in the early 2000s. They also praised the incorporation of the macrophilia elements, saying that Saeko appeals to those with an interest in the fetish while also being able to attract the curiosity of those who had not previously been interested in it.

On June 4, 2025, Hyper Real stated that Saeko had sold over 10,000 copies within the first few days of its release. It received positive reviews from players on Steam, earning a "Very Positive" rating on the platform as of June 20, 2025.

== See also ==
- Ladykiller in a Bind
