= Monkeygate =

Monkeygate may refer to:

- Monkeygate, a controversy involving the Indian cricket team in Australia in 2007–08
- Monkeygate, a Volkswagen emissions scandal
- Monkey hate, a 2023 internet controversy revolving around zoosadism committed against monkeys
- Andira Incident, a controversy involving deceptive character drop rate practices on the mobile-web game Granblue Fantasy
