= Trample =

Trampling may refer to:

- Trampling, the effect on soil, vegetation and ground structures
- Trampling (sexual practice)
- Trampling during stampedes

Trample may also refer to:

- Lady Trample (born 1991), New Zealander skater

== See also ==
- Trampled (disambiguation)
