= Southport Sockmen =

1998 Criminal case in UK

Between approximately 1996 and 1998, Steven Bain and Steven Gawthrop, two men in Southport, England, ran a scam to trick people into surrendering socks. They became known as the Southport Sockmen.

Bain and Gawthrop would approach people in bars and clubs in Southport and buy the socks off their feet, claiming to be collecting them for charity. They would also take photos of the socks' owners, including two policemen and a traffic warden, and carefully keep track of their names and pictures. It later emerged that the men were foot fetishists and were hoarding the socks for their own sexual gratification. They also paid their victims to carry out masochistic acts.

When the men's flat was raided, the police found socks in 18-inch-deep (460 mm) piles everywhere around the residence, such that one officer commented it was "like an explosion in a sock factory". The socks were thought to number 10,000, and later estimated at 30,000. In June 1998, Bain and Gawthrop were both sentenced to 18 months incarceration, and were registered as sex offenders. Whilst in prison, the pair got a job working in the prison laundry cleaning prisoners' socks.

In 2016, a 14 minute short film titled Holes in their Souls, detailing the scam, was released. The film's writer and director, Andy Smith, was one of the Sockmen's victims. The film was independently funded, with a £10,000 budget raised in 28 days.
