= Zoosadism =

Sexual pleasure from the pain of animals

Zoosadism is a type of sadism in which it involves pleasure derived from cruelty to animals. It can also be a paraphilia, where people are sexually aroused by torturing animals. Zoosadism is part of the Macdonald triad, a set of three behaviors that have been considered the precursor to psychopathic behavior.

== Research ==
Some studies have suggested that individuals who are cruel to animals are more likely to be violent to humans. According to The New York Times:

The FBI has found that a history of cruelty to animals is one of the traits that regularly appear in its computer records of serial rapists and murderers, and the standard diagnostic and treatment manual for psychiatric and emotional disorders lists cruelty to animals as a diagnostic criterion for conduct disorders.

However, Helen Gavin wrote in Criminological and Forensic Psychology (2013):

This is not a universal trait, though. Dennis Nilsen had difficulty initiating social contact with people, but loved his faithful companion, Bleep, a mongrel bitch. After his arrest, he was very concerned for her welfare, as she was taken to the police station too.

Alan R. Felthous reported in his paper "Aggression Against Cats, Dogs, and People" (1980):

A survey of psychiatric patients who had repeatedly tortured dogs and cats found all of them had high levels of aggression toward people as well, including one patient who had murdered a boy.

This is a commonly reported finding, and for this reason, cruelty to animals is often considered a warning sign of potential violence towards humans.

Piers Beirne, a professor of criminology at the University of Southern Maine, has criticized existing studies for ignoring socially accepted practices of violence against animals, such as animal slaughter and vivisection, that might be linked to violence against humans.

== Cases ==
Serial killers such as Ted Bundy, Edmund Kemper, Jeffrey Dahmer, and Albert DeSalvo were known for torturing and killing animals in their youth.

In September 2018, a whistleblower exposed part of the furry fandom as animal abusers. One zoosadist exposed during this scandal was an adult member of the furry fandom in Cuba, by the name of Rubén Marrero Pernas, also known as "Woof". Pernas was found to be raping, torturing and killing dogs and puppies and recording the acts online for a group of zoosadists on Telegram who found this to be sexually gratifying. Pernas being exposed led to public outrage, and eventual legal reform.

A Canadian man, Leighton Labute, known as DollyFlesh online, was arrested in 2020 for torturing and killing three hamsters, and uploading the video to social media.

Zoosadist Adam Britton, who mainly used Telegram to distribute recordings of his rape, torture and murder of dogs, was arrested in 2022 and pled guilty in 2023.

In June 2023, the BBC uncovered a global monkey torture ring, where participants would produce and distribute videos of monkeys being hurt and killed.

A Canadian man, Peter Krsul, was arrested in 2026 with animal cruelty and bestiality charges after a severely emaciated cat was found bound at a motel residence and later had to be euthanized in Niagara Falls.

== Legal status ==
In 1999, the United States Congress enacted a statute affecting the legality of crush films which criminalized the creation, sale, and possession of depictions of animal cruelty, though with an exception for "any depiction that has serious religious, political, scientific, educational, journalistic, historical, or artistic value."

In 2008, the United States Court of Appeals for the Third Circuit invalidated the ban on the sale and possession of such films (if not otherwise obscene) as a violation of the Constitution's guarantee for freedom of speech. The United States Supreme Court affirmed the Third Circuit's decision in United States v. Stevens, finding the law unconstitutional because the law was so broad and vague that it included any portrayal of an animal in or being harmed such as by hunting or disease.

On November 28, 2010, bill H.R. 5566, which prohibits interstate commerce in animal crush films, was passed by the House of Representatives and the Senate, and on December 9, the bill was signed by President Obama becoming the Animal Crush Video Prohibition Act of 2010.

On September 8, 2015, a Houston woman pleaded guilty in the nation's first federal animal crush video case.

On November 25, 2019, President Donald Trump signed into law the PACT ACT, the Preventing Animal Cruelty and Torture (PACT) Act, which authorized the FBI and other federal law enforcement agencies to prosecute malicious animal cruelty. The PACT act defines animal crushing as when "one or more living non-human mammals, birds, reptiles or amphibians is purposely crushed, burned, drowned, suffocated, impaled or otherwise subjected to serious bodily injury."

== See also ==
- Sexual sadism disorder, for the equivalent paraphilia when the victim is human
- Bloodsport
- Cruelty to animals
- Crush fetish
