= Richard Holden =

Richard Holden may refer to:

== Sports ==
- Rick Holden (born 1964), English footballer
- Dick Holden (1885–?), English footballer
- Richard Holden (tennis), played Tennis at the 1995 Summer Universiade

== Others ==
- Richard Holden (British politician), Conservative MP
- Richard Holden (economist) (born 1974), Australian economist
- Richard Holden (Canadian politician) (1931–2005), Canadian lawyer and politician
- Richard Holden (dancer) (1927–2015), American dancer and choreographer
- Richard Holden (New Zealand), businessman and mayoral candidate, see Les Mills
- Richard Holden (highway patrol) (d. 2014), American highway patrol commander
