= Crush fetish =

Type of paraphilia

A crush fetish is a fetish and a paraphilia in which sexual arousal is associated with observing objects being crushed or being crushed oneself. The crushed objects vary from inanimate items (e.g., food), to injurious and/or fatal crushing of invertebrates (e.g., insects, snails, worms, spiders), or vertebrates (e.g., birds, reptiles, non-human mammals).

In the most severe cases, crushing has involved homicide or extended torture until death of restrained animals including dogs, cats, pigs, and monkeys. Animal welfare organisations, such as the Humane Society of the United States, condemn this practice. Additionally, links between animal abuse and violence towards humans are being researched, with animal abuse perhaps being a precursor to further violence, and animal cruelty cases have been tracked by the American FBI since 2016. The motivation for these acts may be in the financial gain derived from producing a film of the acts, which is sold on the Internet to crush fetishists who find the content sexually gratifying and perhaps entertaining, a tailored genre known as "crush film". Those in impoverished areas may be more likely to produce and star in this content due to financial gain.

There are currently no laws specifically forbidding the act of crushing animals, but general animal protection laws apply in many countries, prohibiting and sanctioning unnecessary torture and killing of animals. However the production or trade of crush erotica involving live vertebrates is illegal in many countries, including the United States, Italy and the United Kingdom. In the United States, interstate commerce in (hard) crush videos has been illegal since 2010, and many other countries also have banned them.

== Classification ==
Crush fetishists have used terms to classify crushing on the basis of the victim subjected to the crushing:

- 'Object crush' – crushing of food, toys, electronics and other non-living items.
- 'Soft crush' – crushing of invertebrates and fish. This is the most common form. Most exclusive soft crush fetishists prefer to distinguish themselves from hard crush fetishists, believing that hard crush fetishists give them an unduly negative reputation.
- 'Hard crush' – crushing of amphibians, reptiles, avians, and mammals. This is considered to be more cruel than soft crush as terrestrial vertebrates are believed to have a greater capacity to suffer pain.

== Crush films ==
Example of an object crush fetish film using kiwifruits

=== General ===
Crush films are videos produced for sexual gratification of crush fetishists.

In crush films, the crushing agent is typically a woman, who will concentrate her body weight upon her feet to compress the object against the floor. The feet are typically dressed in sexually suggestive dominatrix-like footwear, such as high-heels and lace stockings, but other footwear or bare feet may be used. This recalls elements of both foot fetishism and BDSM culture.

Jeff Vilencia is one known director of crush films, such as Smush! Vilencia, along with many other fetishists, has loved to see invertebrates crushed since a young age; he claims that when he was two–three years old, he repeatedly attempted to get people to step on him.

=== Legal status ===
The legality of crush films and the actual practice of crushing varies by region; however, many have been posted on web sites and are available for download via the Internet, making the control of their distribution difficult.

The production or trade of crush erotica involving vertebrates is condemned by opponents of animal cruelty and is illegal in many countries, including the United States.

==== United States ====
In 1999, the United States Congress enacted a statute affecting the legality of crush films which criminalized the creation, sale, and possession of depictions of animal cruelty, though with an exception for "any depiction that has serious religious, political, scientific, educational, journalistic, historical, or artistic value." In 2008, the United States Court of Appeals for the Third Circuit invalidated the ban on the sale and possession of such films (if not otherwise obscene) as a violation of the Constitution's guarantee for freedom of speech. The United States Supreme Court affirmed the Third Circuit's decision in United States v. Stevens, finding the law unconstitutional because the law was so broad and vague that it included any portrayal of an animal in or being harmed such as by hunting or disease. On November 28, 2010, bill H.R. 5566, which prohibits interstate commerce in animal crush films, was passed by the House of Representatives and the Senate, and on December 9, the bill was signed by President Obama becoming the Animal Crush Video Prohibition Act of 2010.

On September 8, 2015, a Houston woman pleaded guilty in the nation's first federal animal crush video case.

On November 25, 2019, President Donald Trump signed the Preventing Animal Cruelty and Torture Act (PACT Act) into law, making animal "crushing" and sexual abuse of animals a federal felony if the offense is in or affecting foreign or interstate commerce, or if it is committed on federally owned property, such as national parks, federal prisons, and military bases. While the law does not supersede state or local law, a PACT conviction does provide for federal fines and imprisonment of up to seven years. The PACT act defines animal crushing as when "one or more living non-human mammals, birds, reptiles or amphibians is purposely crushed, burned, drowned, suffocated, impaled or otherwise subjected to serious bodily injury."

==== United Kingdom ====
The first arrest in the UK was made in 2002. The industry is estimated to generate hundreds of thousands of pounds' worth of sales.

==== China ====
In 2006 an Internet crush video surfaced in which a woman stomps on a kitten with stiletto high-heels. Eventually the woman drives her heel into the kitten's eye and penetrates the eye socket, leading to loss of blood and the death of the kitten. Internet users discovered and revealed the identity of the woman, revealing her to be a nurse, and the cameraman to be a provincial television employee. The nurse posted an apology on the Luobei city government website, claiming that she was susceptible to persuasion to crush the kitten, being despondent from her recent divorce. Both the nurse and the cameraman lost their jobs as a result of the incident, although their actions were not illegal under the country's laws.

== See also ==
- Animal abuse
- Macrophilia
- Paraphilia
- Shock video
- Vorarephilia
- Zoosadism
