= Pregnancy fetishism =

Pregnancy seen as an erotic phenomenon

Pregnancy fetishism (also known as maiesiophilia or maieusophoria) is a context where pregnancy is seen by individuals or cultures as an erotic phenomenon. It may involve sexual attraction to women who are pregnant or appear pregnant, attraction to lactation, or attraction to particular stages of pregnancy such as impregnation or childbirth.

== Characteristics ==
There are no particular or preferred elements within maiesiophilia that are common to all maiesiophiliacs. Some may pursue fantasies that are concerned with the circumstances in which a subject may give birth, or to the conditions to which the pregnant subject may find themselves acting upon, such as approaches to mobility, sleeping, and dressing, even morning sickness could be considered attractive, however all of this depends on the person. Particularly an enlarged abdomen is the reason for the attractiveness as well as more psychological aspects such as signs of fertility.

== Culture ==
Pregnancy as represented in 1991 on the More Demi Moore cover of Vanity Fair.

The naked appearance of actress Demi Moore in the advanced stage of pregnancy on the cover of Vanity Fair magazine in 1991 marked the beginning of a period which has since seen pregnancy presented by celebrities as a glamorous state of living, while also creating a market for photographers to produce images of pregnant mothers, and for fashion stylists to introduce "pregnancy styling" to their business.

According to 2017 PornHub search statistics, pregnancy fetishistic pornography is becoming increasingly popular in the United States, with pregnancy-related keyword searches having increased 20% since 2014. In 2017, female users were 27% more likely than men to search for pregnancy-related porn.

Impregnation fantasies are characterized by the arousal or gratification from the possibility, consequences, or risk of impregnation through unprotected vaginal sex. Impregnation fantasies are often indulged by reading erotic literature and role playing with a partner.

== See also ==
- Alvinolagnia
- Erotic lactation
- Fat fetishism
- Impregnation fetishism
- Mpreg
- Unbirthing, a subtype of Vore, which fetishizes an individual entering the womb through the vagina.
