= Footwork =

Footwork may refer to:

- Footwork (cricket)
- Footwork (dance)
- Footwork (genre), a genre of electronic music, also known as juke
- Footwork (martial arts), which includes boxing footwork
- Footwork Racing Team, a British motor racing team

== See also ==
- Foot play (disambiguation)
