= Giantess =

Female giant

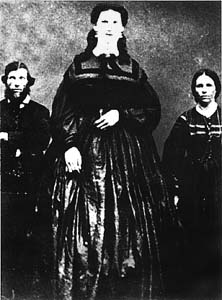
Giantess Anna Haining Bates (née Swan) with her parents.

Giantesses are female giants: either a mythical being, such as the Amazons of Greek mythology, resembling a woman of superhuman size and strength or a human woman of exceptional stature, often the result of some medical or genetic abnormality (see gigantism).

== Polytheism and mythology ==
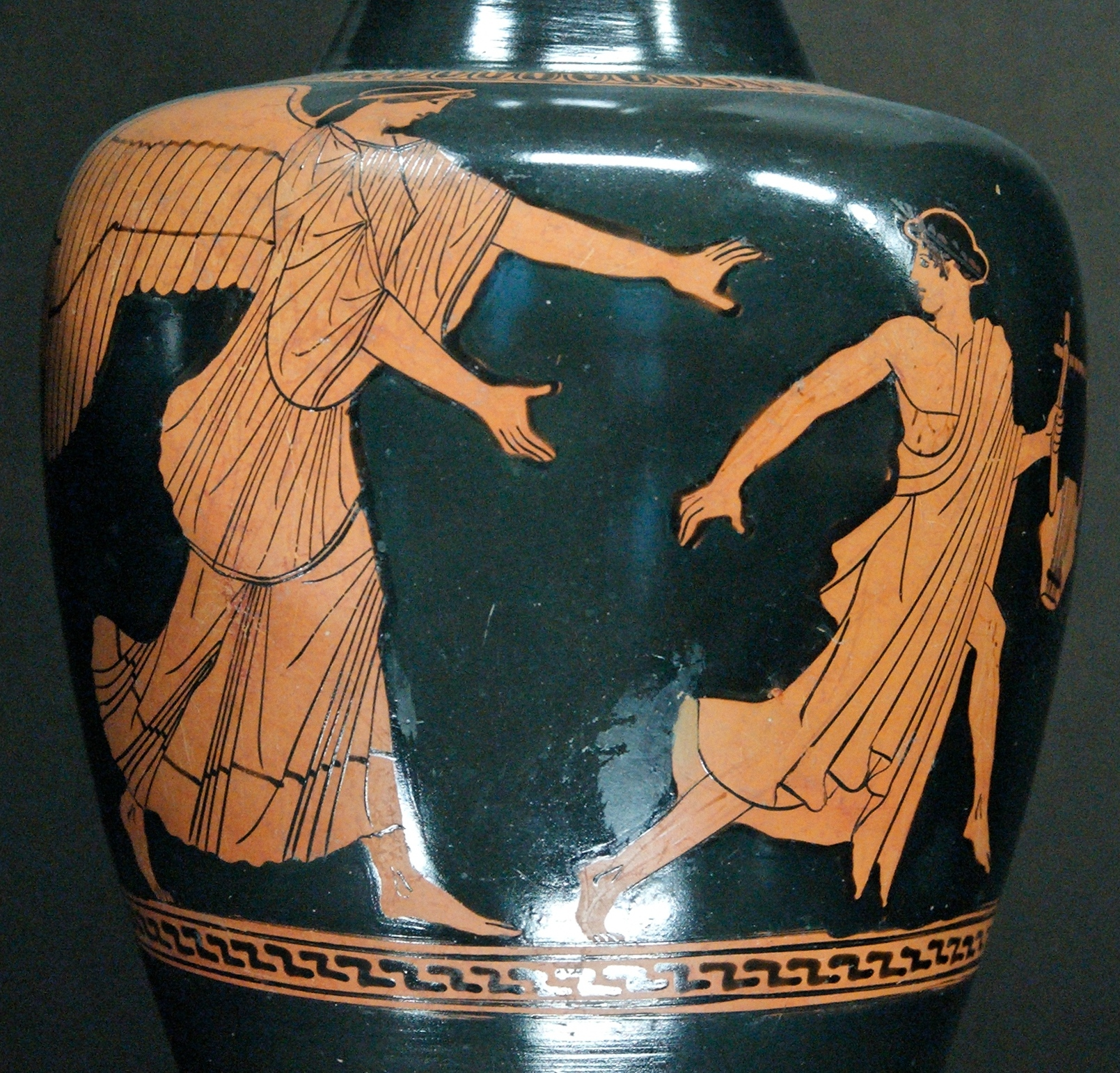
The Titanide Eos pursues the object of her affection, the reluctant Tithonos, on an Attic oinochoe of the Achilles Painter, ca. 470 BC–460 BCE (Louvre)

=== Baltic mythology ===
In 543, according to the folk etymology for the name of Neringa Municipality, there was a giantess girl named Neringa on the seashore formed the Curonian Spit, who helped fishermen.

=== Greek mythology ===
The Titanides, sisters and children of Titans, may not have originally been seen as giants, but later Hellenistic poets and Latin ones tended to blur Titans and Giants. In a surviving fragment of Naevius' poem on the Punic war, he describes the Gigantes Runcus and Purpureus (Porphyrion):

Inerant signa expressa, quo modo Titani
bicorpores Gigantes, magnique Atlantes
Runcus ac Purpureus filii Terras.

Eduard Fraenkel remarks of these lines, with their highly unusual plural Atlantes, "It does not surprise us to find the names Titani and Gigantes employed indiscriminately to denote the same mythological creatures, for we are used to the identification, or confusion, of these two types of monsters which, though not original, had probably become fairly common by the time of Naevius". Other giantesses in Greek myth include Periboea, the princess of the giants that participated in the Gigantomachy, and the queen and princess of the Laestrygonians who participated in the attacking and devouring of Odysseus' crew.

=== Nordic mythology ===
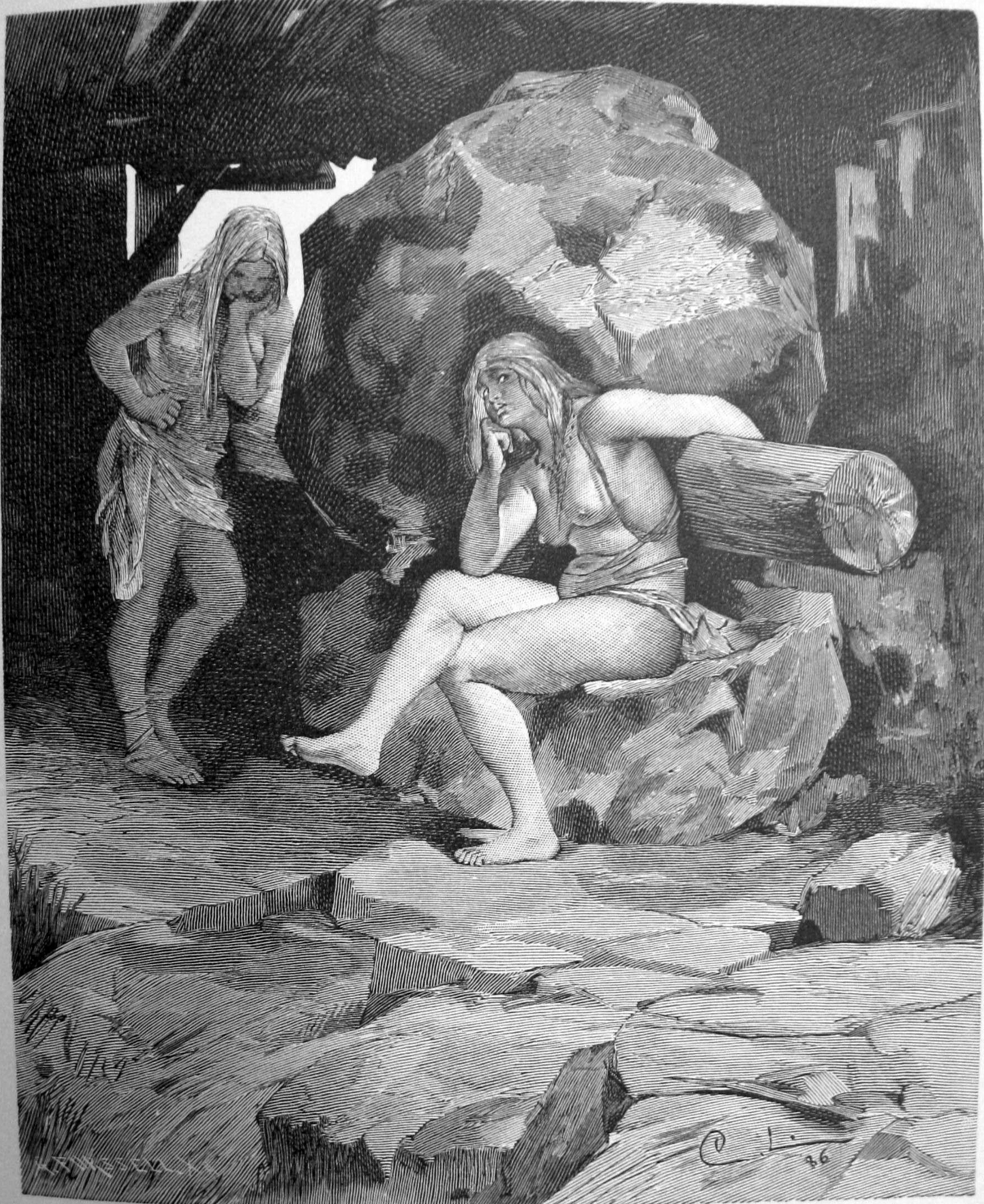
Enslaved gýgjar Fenja and Menja plot revenge against their selfish owner, King Fróði

Female jötnar have a prominent role in Nordic mythology, where they are referred to as gýgr, íviðja and tröllkona. While these terms are often glossed as "giantess", in texts containing the oldest traditions, they are often not notably large and the terms are often left untranslated.

Notable gýgjar include:

- Gríðr - a gýgr who saved Thor's life. She was aware of the jötunn Geirrod's plans to get Thor killed and sets out to help him by supplying him with a belt of strength, a pair of magical iron gloves, and a magical wand.
- Gerðr - A beautiful gýgr with whom Freyr fell in love at first sight, as told in Skírnismál. After marrying him, she became the mother of the mythic Swedish king Fjölnir.
- Skaði - The daughter of Þjazi, whom the gods had killed. After journeying to Ásgarðr from Þrymheimr, she agreed that she would renounce her vengeance on two conditions: that they allow her to choose a husband from among them, and that they succeed in making her laugh. The gods allowed her to choose a husband, but she had to choose him only from his feet; she choose Njörðr because his feet were so beautiful that she thought he was Baldr. Then Loki succeeded in making her laugh, so peace was made, and Odin made two stars from Þjazi's eyes. After a while, she and her husband separated because she loved the mountains, while he wanted to live near the sea in Nóatún.
- Hyrrokin - A gýgr who came riding on a wolf to Baldr's funeral and gave the ship he had been lain upon such a push that fire flashed from the rollers and all the earth shook.
- Thokk - The only being who refused to weep upon Baldr's death, resulting in Hel not releasing the god from the underworld until after Ragnarök. According to Snorri Sturluson, Thokk was Loki in disguise.

=== Hinduism ===
Giantesses are fairly common in the Hindu religion. The demoness Putana (who attempted to kill the baby Krishna with poisoned milk from her breasts) is usually drawn as a giantess.

=== Celtic mythology ===
Giantesses are common in the folklore of Britain and Ireland, Scotland and Wales. A notable giantess in Irish mythology is Bébinn who comes from a kingdom known as "The Land of Maidens" which is entirely populated by other giantesses, who are her one hundred and forty nine sisters, with the only males in her land being her father and three brothers.

=== Turkish folklore ===
In Turkish folklore, a man sucking milk of a "giant mother" (dev anası) is a common narrative. In this theme, a man is supposed to drink the milk of a giantess without being noticed. Thus, he will become an adoptive child of her and the giantess will not attack him. Those motives are encountered in stories such as Altın Bülbül (Golden Nightingale) and Seksen Göz (Eighty Eyes).

== Modern art and literature ==
=== Books ===
In Lewis Carroll's story Alice's Adventures in Wonderland, there are several scenes where the heroine Alice grows to giant size by means of eating something (like a cake or a mushroom). Similarly Arthur C. Clarke's story Cosmic Casanova describes an astronaut's revulsion at discovering that an extraterrestrial female he adored on a video screen is in fact thirty feet tall.

=== Comics ===
Size-changing heroines have appeared in such comics as Doom Patrol, Mighty Avengers, Marvel Adventures Avengers, Team Youngblood, and Femforce. In the latter series, the giantess-superheroines Tara and Garganta combine immense size and strength with beauty and femininity, and have a cult following among both men and women. Conversely, size-changing villainesses, such as Wonder Woman foe Giganta, use their strength and beauty for less altruistic purposes as a weapon to crush their foes. Giantesses are also common in the manga and anime mediums of Japan. She-Hulk's nickname is "The Jade Giantess", due to the main character growing in size and more powerful when becoming She-Hulk.

The giantess also appears in modern-day art, illustration and fashion. UK based illustrator Emma Melton has used the giantess as a symbol in her illustrated fashion line 'Blessed by a Giantess', which aims to promote healthy body image in young girls and spread the message that 'We are all beautiful.

=== Motion pictures ===
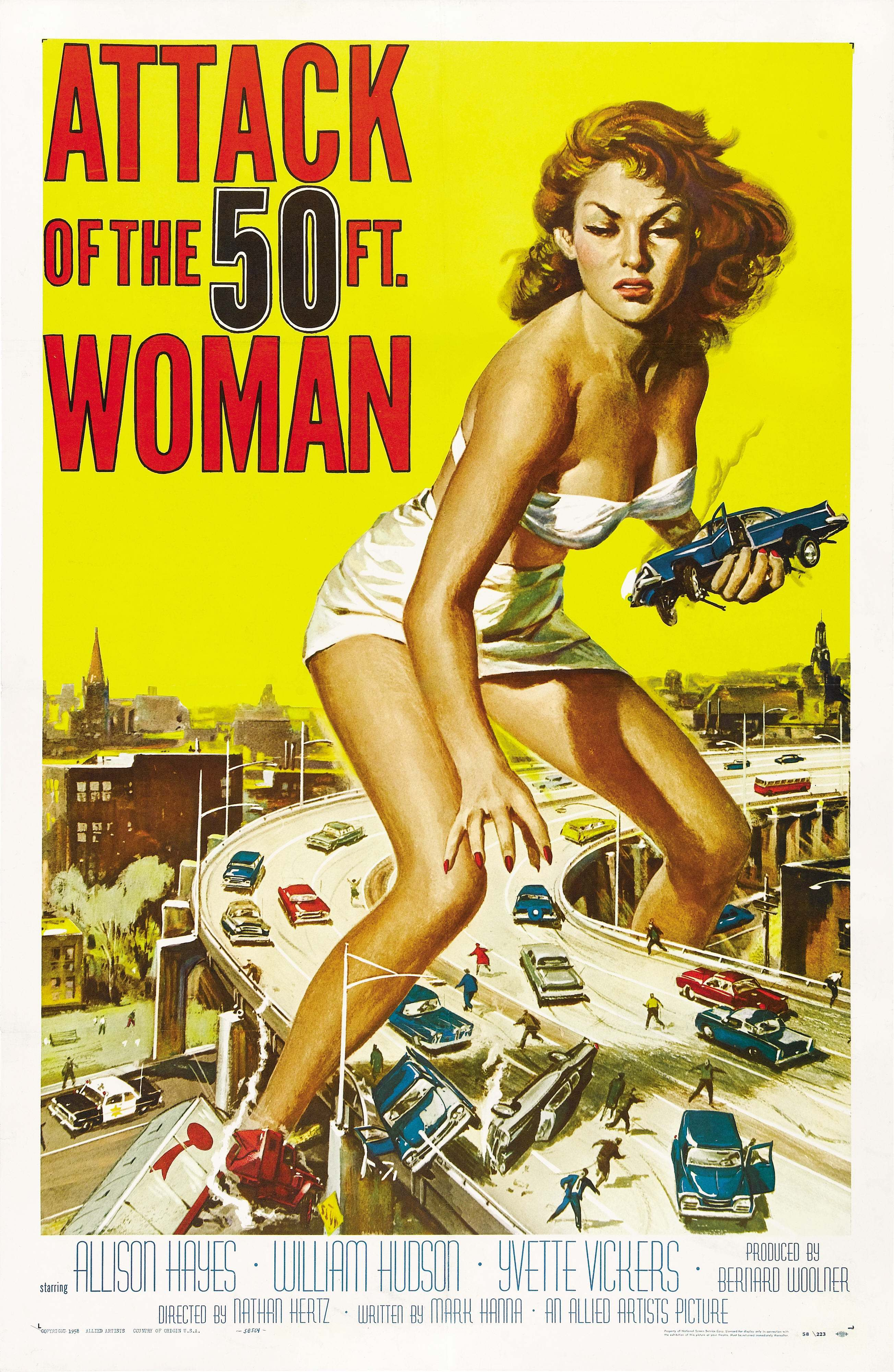
Poster of Attack of the 50 Foot Woman

The giantess theme has also appeared in motion pictures, often as a metaphor for female empowerment or played for absurd humor. The 1958 B-movie Attack of the 50 Foot Woman formed part of a series of size-changing films of the era which also included The Incredible Shrinking Man, The 30 Foot Bride of Candy Rock, and Village of the Giants. The 1993 remake of Attack of the 50 Foot Woman, starring Daryl Hannah in the title role, was advertised as a comedy; many scenes did parody earlier size-changing movies (most notably The Amazing Colossal Man), although the central theme was feminist. The heroine Nancy, formerly a cipher to her domineering father and husband, is empowered by her new-found size and starts to take control of her destiny, and encourages other women to do the same.

In Dude, Where's My Car?, five nubile female characters morph into an extraterrestrial 20 foot tall giantess played by Jodi Ann Paterson who picks up one of the characters and eats him. Talk to Her features a sequence in the style of early silent cinema called 'The Shrinking Lover,' where an accidentally shrunken scientist is rescued from his mother's clutches by his lover, who carries him home in her handbag. The shrunken scientist then roams his lover's body while she lies in bed. Monsters vs. Aliens features a satirization of Attack of the 50 Foot Woman in which the main protagonist, Susan Murphy, is clobbered by a radioactive meteor that causes her to grow up to 49 feet, 11½ inches, becoming Ginormica. In Attack of the 50 Foot Cheerleader, Cassie Stradford, a college student, steals a drug and injects herself with it to make her pretty. However, the drug had a side effect when she starts to grow taller and taller until she is a 50-foot-tall giantess. The Incredible Shrinking Woman, which parodies The Incredible Shrinking Man, ends with Lily Tomlin becoming a giantess.

Outside of Hollywood, giantesses have also appeared in special interest films. AC Comics giantess Garganta is featured in a live action DVD movie available from accomics.com entitled Gargantarama, which also includes giantess scenes from many movies as well as the feature length 1958 B-movie Attack of the 50 Foot Woman. Embracing the use of the giantess in popular culture, AC has made it a frequently recurring theme in their products.

Giantesses have also appeared in advertisement campaigns, with similar erotic/humorous intent. In 2003, a commercial for the Italian company Puma featured the theme. The giantess, played by model/actress Valentina Biancospino, stomps around town causing havoc and swallowing a man whole before finally picking up a man (played by Italian footballer Gianluigi Buffon) and kissing him.

Natasha Stefanenko plays a giantess in the Italian advert Natasha Stefanenko : La gigantessa, where she rescues a horse from a spaceship and puts it back in its place and she accidentally breaks a building by sitting on it and Anna Campori provides the voice of Natasha in this advert.

Giantesses have also appeared in some television series such as Genie in the House, Snorks, Schoolhouse Rock, Jackie Chan Adventures, Braceface, The Electric Company, The Muppet Show, Dexter's Laboratory, Futurama, Justice League Unlimited, Animaniacs, Toonsylvania, Kids Next Door, Archie's Weird Mysteries, Harley Quinn, The Powerpuff Girls in Attack of the Fifty Footed Woman, Totally Spies! episode in Attack Of The 50 Ft Mandy, Phineas and Ferb, Rick and Morty, The 7D, The Grim Adventures of Billy & Mandy, Disenchantment, The Cuphead Show!, Jelly Jamm and American Dragon: Jake Long. The Snorks episode "The Littlest Mermaid" features a scene where a mermaid grows into a giantess caused by a machine. The Schoolhouse Rock episode "Unpack Your Adjectives" includes a scene where a tall girl grows into a 34-foot giantess, causing only her legs and sandals to be seen. She then stomps on a small boy who wouldn't stop laughing at how tall she grew. In the first episode of The Electric Company, Judy Graubart grows into a giantess while holding up a sign for the kid audience to read that says "giant".

=== Music videos ===
Pamela Anderson plays a giantess version of her V.I.P. Character Vallery Irons in the music video for "Miserable" by the rock group Lit. In the video, the band members perform on Anderson's body and are eventually devoured by her at the end, serving as a metaphor for women who are "maneaters."

Kylie Minogue appears as a giantess in the music video for the single "Giving You Up".

Lana Del Rey plays a giantess walking around Los Angeles in the music video for her cover of Sublime's "Doin' Time".

== See also ==
- Macrophilia
- Vorarephilia
