= North Carolina State Highway Patrol =

Highway patrol agency for North Carolina, US

- Shoulder patch of the North Carolina State Highway Patrol

- Seal of the North Carolina State Highway Patrol

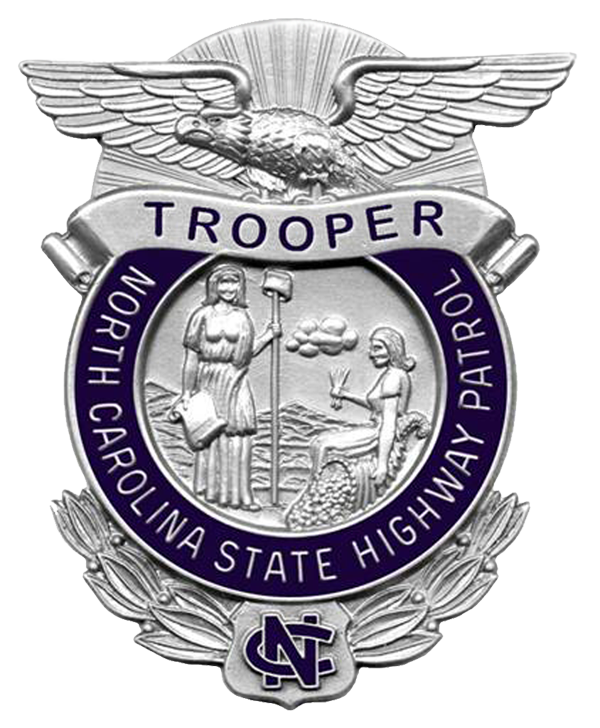
- Trooper badge of the North Carolina State Highway Patrol
- Abbreviation: NCSHP
- Motto: Esse Quam Videri; Latin: To be rather than to seem

Agency overview
- Formed: 1 July 1929; 97 years ago
- Employees: 2,178 (as of 2019)
- Volunteers: 12 (as of 2008)

Jurisdictional structure
- Operations jurisdiction: North Carolina, USA
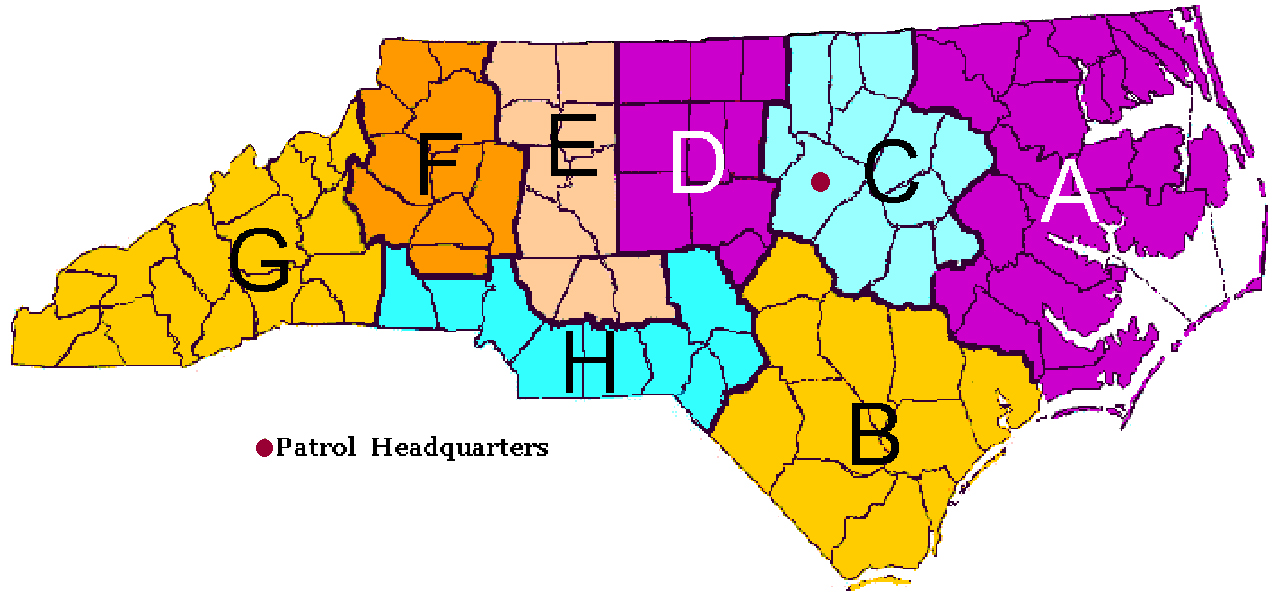
- North Carolina State Highway Patrol Troops
- Area: 53,865 square miles (139,510 km^{2})
- Population: 10,389,388 (2020 cens.)
- Legal jurisdiction: State of North Carolina
- Constituting instrument: North Carolina Constitution
- General nature: Civilian police

Operational structure
- Headquarters: 512 North Salisbury Street; Raleigh, North Carolina
- Troopers: 1,873 (as of 2025)
- Civilian members (uniformed and non uniformed personnel w/various titles)s: 508 (as of 2014)
- Agency executive: Freddy L. Johnson Jr., Commander (Colonel)
- Parent agency: North Carolina Governor
- Sections: 5: Administrative Services; Technical Support Unit; Office of Professional Standards; Training; Field Operations
- Troop Headquarters: 8: Greenville; Fayetteville; Raleigh; Greensboro; Salisbury; Newton; Asheville; Monroe

Facilities
- Districts: 54
- Airbases: 4
- Lockups: None (local county jails or state juvenile facilities used)
- Helicopters: Bell 206 JetRanger, Bell OH-58A+ and Bell 407
- Dogs and horses: Narcotic Detection Canines and ceremonial horses

Notables
- Anniversary: July 1st
- Award: CALEA Accredited

Website
- NCSHP website NCSHP Org Chart

The North Carolina State Highway Patrol (NCSHP) is the highway patrol agency for North Carolina which has no per-se "state police" agency. The Patrol has jurisdiction anywhere in the state except for federal or military installations and on the Cherokee Indian Reservation or on Cherokee outlying lands in the western mountains. NCSHP personnel at times conduct formations, inspections, and honor guard activities. The primary stated mission of the North Carolina State Highway Patrol is to ensure safe and efficient transportation on the streets and highways, reduce crime, protect against terrorism, enforce motor vehicle laws, and respond to natural and man-made disasters.

The Highway Patrol is an independent, cabinet level agency, with its commander answering directly to the governor. The patrol's headquarters is located in the DPS headquarters in Raleigh in the Archdale Building downtown. This building also houses the NC Department of Public Safety, which also includes the NC State Bureau of Investigation (SBI), NC Alcohol Law Enforcement (ALE), NC Civil Air Patrol, Emergency Management, NC State Capitol Police, and the NC National Guard.

== History ==
Established in 1929, the NC State Highway Patrol's mission is to ensure safe and efficient transportation on the streets and highways, reduce crime, protect against terrorism, enforce motor vehicle laws, and respond to natural and man-made disasters.

North Carolina, like many Southern states, was distrusted by the federal government from starting a "state police" agency, due to concerns that the department would be used for political motives to intimidate blacks from voting in the late 1920s, at a time when lynchings and Ku Klux Klan activities were on the rise following the end of World War I. The vast majority of the 100 NC Sheriffs also did not want to lose political power to a state police agency. These issues were alleviated by establishment of a traffic enforcement agency to police the ever-expanding highways with the enforcement of motor vehicles laws primarily. The original members of the Highway Patrol were the command staff and they were sent to the Pennsylvania State Police Academy for training. Upon their graduation and return to North Carolina, these men established the first basic school at Camp Glenn, an abandoned World War I Army Camp in Morehead City where Carteret General Hospital is now located. Several extra recruits were brought to the original basic school and were sent home as alternates, in the event that original members quit or were fired. Most of these men were never recalled to duty after 8 weeks of training. Over the years, the agency obtained semi-state police powers with the authority of the Governor to implement it, but this has never been fully done by any NC Governor. Changes in the regulations by the general assembly were made in response to political appointees being named as commander. The changes ensured that the commander of the SHP must meet all trooper requirements, including completion of the grueling basic trooper training school, thus preventing unqualified political appointees from being named commander.

=== Establishment ===
In 1921, 150,558 motor vehicles were registered in North Carolina. By 1929, the number of registered vehicles increased to 503,590. As the number of vehicles increased, so did the number of people killed in traffic accidents: 690 deaths in 1929.

Traffic control was of such concern that in 1929 the General Assembly passed an act authorizing the establishment of a State Highway Patrol. The new organization was given statutory responsibility to patrol the highways of the state, enforce the motor vehicle laws, and assist the motoring public.

The organization was designed as a division of the State Highway Commission. The Highway Commission initially sent ten men (later designated as a captain and nine lieutenants) to Pennsylvania to attend the training school of the Pennsylvania State Police. Their mission was to study law, first aid, light adjustments, vehicle operation, and related subjects for use in North Carolina's first Patrol School.

The SHP was housed in the Department of Revenue's Motor Vehicle Bureau until 1941 becoming part of the newly formed NC Department of Transportation, but was again transferred to the newly formed Department of Crime Control and Public Safety in the mid-1970s. This agency more recently became the Department of Public Safety, which expanded to absorb other agencies including the State Bureau of Investigation and other state departments dealing with statewide law enforcement.

An office was established in Raleigh to serve as state headquarters, and a district office was established in each of the nine state DOT highway districts. A lieutenant and three patrolmen were assigned to each district. All patrolmen were issued Harley Davidson motorcycles and the lieutenants drove Model A Ford Coupes. The Patrol commander was issued a Buick automobile. The new patrolmen and command staff made a cross-state introductory riding tour on July 1, 1929 to show off the new agency's personnel to the state. On the following day, the first officer death occurred when Patrolman George I. Thompson, who was driving his motorcycle in the procession, was killed in a traffic collision in Anson County (see below for line-of-duty deaths).

=== Growth ===
In 1933, the General Assembly detached the patrol from the State Highway and Public Works Commission and placed under the control of North Carolina Department of Revenue's Motor Vehicle Bureau. Legislation capped the force to 67 patrolmen and authorized it perform inspections of gasoline, oil and gasoline pumps.

Without vehicular radios, patrolmen were issued 2 rolls of dimes each week so they could phone in for calls on a regular basis. Though the legislature authorized the patrol to establish a one-way statewide radio system in 1937, it had many areas of no reception (dead spots), especially in the far eastern coastal areas and more so in the rugged western mountains. The system was flawed in that patrolmen could not answer back. Poor reception made it hard for patrolmen to tell which patrolman was being called, even when they could hear the radio. If dispatchers could not locate a patrolman, they would call certain selected stores, gas stations and post offices in the particular patrolman's district and ask the employees or personnel to watch for and to flag the patrolman down the next time he was seen passing by and to tell him to call in. If patrolmen arrested a violator, they would have minor offenders follow them to the justice of the peace office or courthouse. If they physically arrested a violator, the patrolmen would hide their motorcycle in brush and drive an offender to the local jail in his own vehicle.

All patrolmen were assigned individual vehicles in 1937, and over the passing decades, numerous executive, legislative, and administrative changes have occurred since the Patrol's creation. The duties and responsibilities have varied, different ranks have been designated, and the organizational structure has been modified to improve efficiency, to address the needs of the state and in response to changing technology. Examples included an expanded air wing after World War II, implementation of two-way radios, use of helicopters, abolition of fixed-wing aircraft, use of breath testing devices, K-9 dog units, body armor, pursuit vehicles such as Mustangs and Camaros, speed measurement instruments such as the "whammy" in the 1950s, later RADAR, VASCAR and LIDAR and more recently computerized dispatch through in-vehicle terminals.

In World War II, a number of Patrolmen who had served in World War I were recall to active duty and others enlisted, taking leave of absence from the SHP. Many others had served in the Guard or Reserves. Patrolmen assisted the military by being alert for saboteurs and spies by reporting suspicious activity to the FBI. Deserters and AWOLS were also arrested. By 1946, all personnel on military status had returned to duty with the Patrol.

As of 2025, the North Carolina State Highway Patrol had an authorized strength of over 1,925 sworn law enforcement officers, including Capital Police, making it the largest police agency in North Carolina. In 2003, over 300 uniformed DMV enforcement officers were permanently reassigned to the SHP and cross-trained as troopers. In 2025, the remaining 203 DMV plain clothes law enforcement inspectors were permanently reassigned to the SHP, ending all law enforcement operations under the NC DMV.

The NC Capital Police Department was also assigned under the SHP, but will continue to function as a semi-independent, sub agency, with distinct badges, uniforms and separately marked patrol cars, responsible mainly to protect state property, facilities, offices, employees and visitors inside the I-440 Beltline, but NCCP’s Chief will be answerable to the SHP Commander, who is a cabinet level secretary-equivalent official as of July 1st, 2025, with a 5-year term of office.

In 2018, the NC State Highway Patrol arrested 19,910 people for Driving While Impaired and investigated 1,037 fatalities on North Carolina highways. The Motor Carrier unit fined thousands of truck drivers for various violations.

== Rank structure ==
Rank	Insignia	Description
Colonel		The Rank of Colonel is held by the North Carolina State Highway Patrol Commander. The NCSHP Commander is appointed by the Governor and confirmed by the legislature, for a 5-year term and is legally a cabinet-level secretary.
Lieutenant Colonel		The Rank of Lieutenant Colonel is held by the North Carolina State Highway Patrol Deputy Commander / Director of Support Operations
Major		Majors are in charge of Support/Operations/Training/Professional Standards
Captain		Captains are Troop Commanders / (1 per troop; others assigned to specific posts)
Lieutenant		(3 per troop; others assigned to specific posts)
First Sergeant		District Commander (1 per patrol district; others assigned to specific posts)
Sergeant		Shift Supervisor (3-6 per patrol district; others assigned to specific post)
Master Trooper		Rank stated on badge (6+ years experience)
Senior Trooper		Rank stated on badge (3–6 years experience)
Trooper		6 months – 3 years experience
Probationary Trooper		0–6 months experience (field training)
Trooper Cadet		Trooper School

Former Ranks

In the history of the Patrol there have been several ranks that have been abolished:

The rank of Patrolman First Class, which was denoted by a one stripe chevron and represented 3 years of service. It was established in the early 1940s, and was abolished in the 1960s.

The rank of Corporal was established in 1931 as second in command in each district. It was abolished in 1968.

The Rank of Technical Sergeant was established in 1951 as third in command in each troop. There were only around eight at a given time in the state and the rank was made almost redundant and obsolete by the addition of the rank of First Sergeant in 1968, and so it too was abolished in 1970.

In 1962 the rank of “Air-wing Sergeant” was created and only held by two men, Patrolman Pilot Al Cope and Patrolman Pilot Dan Williams. The Rank was abolished in 1972 when the helicopter replaced the Patrol's airplanes and Cope left the program. At that time Patrol Pilots were given the rank of “Warrant Officer”.

The Rank of Warrant Officer was used by several Helicopter Pilots for the Patrol until the early 1980s when the rank was abolished.

Lastly the ranks of First and Second Lieutenant were merged into one Lieutenant in the late 1970s to avoid confusion of seniority among members.

== See also ==
- Richard Holden (highway patrol)
- North Carolina Highway Patrol K-9 incident
- Highway patrol
- List of law enforcement agencies in North Carolina
- State patrol
