= North Carolina Highway Patrol K-9 incident =

2007 animal welfare scandal in the United States

On August 8, 2007, during a canine training exercise, North Carolina Highway Patrol Sgt. Charles L. Jones was video taped by cell phone hanging his assigned police dog by the neck and repeatedly kicking the dog in order for it to release a chew toy that was in the dog's mouth. Jones claimed he was following proper canine handling procedure.

The incident originally led to Jones being dismissed and North Carolina canceling its Highway Patrol K-9 program, but on November 22, 2010, a North Carolina Superior Court Judge ruled that Jones was improperly dismissed, and awarded Jones back salary and attorney fees.

== Timeline ==
On August 8, 2007, during a training process at the North Carolina Highway Patrol Training Center, Trooper Ray Herndon video taped Jones hanging and kicking his assigned police dog, a Belgian Shepherd Dog (Malinois) named Ricoh, when the dog refused to release its favorite chew toy. After the training exercise, the video footage was given to Jones' superiors, however, no action was taken to investigate or discipline Jones. One supervisor's administrative assistant was Jones' wife, and both lived in the superior's house in Wake County, North Carolina. Jones' other supervisor was given a written warning for failing to report the existence of the video to his superiors.

On August 28, 2007, the video tape and investigation was given to the internal affairs unit of the Highway Patrol and ultimately the matter was turned over to the North Carolina State Bureau of Investigation and the Wake County, North Carolina, district attorney's office. On August 31, 2007, Jones was placed on paid administrative leave while being investigated. On September 8, 2007, Jones was given a pre-dismissal hearing. Internal affairs recommended Jones be terminated, and Jones was terminated the following day.

In April 2008, a three-day hearing was held in Jones' lawsuit against the state of North Carolina and the North Carolina Highway Patrol for wrongful termination. According to Jones, his technique for forcing the dog to release the chew toy was part of standard police dog training. On April 30, 2008 the Secretary of the State Department of Crime Control and Public Safety suspended the operations of the K-9 program, saying he was disturbed by evidence at Jones' hearing that some troopers thought kicking a dog was acceptable training.

In October 2008, the North Carolina State Personnel Commission ordered the Highway Patrol to reinstate Jones, stating it did not find "just cause to dismiss for unacceptable personal conduct." However, it did find "sufficient cause for discipline for unsatisfactory job performance."

Several animal advocate groups campaigned for Officer Jones to face criminal charges for his actions, however, no criminal charges were filed. Jones' police dog, Ricoh, was removed from his possession and retired.

In late October 2008, Ricoh was found living back with Jones. The Highway Patrol had given Ricoh to another trooper after it was retired, and that trooper gave the dog back to Jones. That trooper testified on his behalf at the April 2008 hearing to reinstate Jones. The Highway Patrol had asked the trooper to return the dog, but he refused.

According to Jones' own reports of more than 240 training sessions leading up to the kicking incident, Jones issued one positive report after another for Ricoh. For the past 18 months, the reports showed that Ricoh obeyed voice commands and hand signals, found illegal drugs stashed in cars and buildings, or passed by those that were clean. He was praised, rewarded or both nearly every time. "Ricoh was utilized for an obedience exercise," Jones wrote in one report on June 11, 2007. "Ricoh did well following all voice and hand commands. Ricoh was rewarded and praised." However, Jones and his former fellow officers testified that Ricoh was a "maniac" and "hard to handle". The discrepancy between the reports and the testimony prompted a criminal investigation by the State Bureau of Investigation.

In December 2008, after the testimony of Jones and his former fellow officers about their canine handling techniques, the North Carolina Highway Patrol canceled its K-9 program indefinitely. In June 2009, the patrol implemented a new program with new dogs and handlers. Six Labrador Retrievers had been paired with freshly trained troopers. The Highway Patrol now uses Labrador Retrievers instead of Shepherd breeds, because they are better at detecting drugs, which is the dogs' primary duty.

== Wrongful termination lawsuit ==
After the Highway Patrol refused to rehire Jones following an October 2008 ruling by a state committee that Jones should be reinstated, Jones sued the state of North Carolina and the Highway Patrol for reinstatement and back salary plus attorney's fees.

On November 22, 2010, a superior court judge ruled that Jones was improperly dismissed, and that Jones should receive back salary and attorney fees. The judge ruled that although Jones' actions were not among the training techniques specifically approved by the Highway Patrol, "they were no worse than the agency's accepted methods."

== See also ==
- United States v. Stevens
