= Impregnation fetishism =

Sexual fetish

Impregnation fetishism, commonly known as a breeding kink, is the experience of intense sexual attraction at the thought of being impregnated or impregnating someone. This means a person wanting to ejaculate inside their partner or to be ejaculated into without any birth control during sexual intercourse.

Impregnation fetishism is characterized by sexual excitement when posed with the risk of becoming or getting someone pregnant during intercourse. According to sex expert Gigi Engle, the fetishism is rooted in the fantasy of getting pregnant, but not the desire of raising a baby. Women may have a breeding kink, but do not necessarily want to get pregnant in real life, whereas men may be turned on by the fantasy of accidentally getting a woman pregnant.

== History ==
Early forms of impregnation-related erotic interest can be traced to periods when reproduction held strong cultural and moral significance. In the Victorian era, reproduction was closely tied to ideals of family stability and national identity. Public discourse emphasized sexual restraint, but private erotic materials often focused on fertility, conception, and the visible signs of pregnancy. Scholars note that Victorian erotica sometimes highlighted reproductive outcomes because they could be described with fewer censorship concerns than explicit sexual acts. This environment encouraged the erotic framing of pregnancy and conception, although the fetish itself had not yet been formally identified. The first theoretical frameworks that help explain the development of impregnation fetishism appeared in early psychoanalytic literature. Sigmund Freud's Three Essays on the Theory of Sexuality (1905) examined the formation of fetishistic interests and the symbolic meaning attached to reproductive functions. Freud did not identify impregnation fetishism as a specific category, but his work is often used by later scholars to understand how reproductive imagery can acquire erotic meaning.

During the late twentieth century, cultural shifts in the study of sexuality created clearer terminology for a wide range of fetishes involving bodily functions and reproductive themes. Researchers of sexuality and gender studies began documenting how fantasies involving conception, pregnancy risk, or fertility symbolism appeared in erotic literature and media. These analyses provided the basis for identifying impregnation fetishism as a distinct form of sexual interest. The rise of the internet in the 1990s and 2000s played a major role in shaping the modern form of the fetish. Online communities, message boards, and user-generated erotic fiction allowed individuals to discuss impregnation scenarios openly and anonymously. Scholars studying digital sexuality note that these platforms made it possible for people with similar interests to form subcultures and create shared terms, narrative styles, and fantasy conventions. As a result, impregnation fetishism developed clearer boundaries as a category within contemporary sexual culture.

Although the modern form of the fetish is primarily associated with online spaces, its historical foundations draw on long-standing cultural themes surrounding fertility, masculinity, and reproduction. These themes appear across Victorian reproductive symbolism, early psychoanalytic theory, and modern analyses of sexual fantasy.

== Psychological perspectives ==
Impregnation fetishism can often be confused with pregnancy fetishism; however, they represent two different psychological and symbolic sensations. Pregnancy fetishism involves the attraction of a pregnant woman, whereas an impregnation fetish focuses on the act or possibility of getting someone, or becoming, pregnant. Pregnancy fetishism has been found to be common in people exposed to pregnancy and lactation between the ages of 1.5 and 5. They concluded that sexual preferences, including pregnancy type fetishes, can be acquired through exposure, and can eroticize symbolic features of pregnancy (nurturance/connection). Some researchers suggest that individuals can associate impregnation with intimacy and may find it to be an arousal trigger.

Although sexual behaviors are mostly private, they are still impacted by broader social scripts shaped from expectations and social norms. Simon and Gagnon (2003) state that "sexual encounter remains a profoundly social act in its enactment and even more so in its antecedents and consequences." In this case, both antecedents and consequences could result in pregnancy. The cultural scripts that associate impregnation with intimacy often merge with sexual scripts of a relationship. Sexual scripting is not meant to be a faultless theory of human sexuality but more of a guide for examining patterns in behavior in sexual situations. Interpersonal scripts can help develop trust or connection between partners, whether they are in a relationship or in a single consensual encounter. These scripts can help individuals interpret sexual situations and the meanings attached to them. Lehmiller and Gormezano (2023) found that most participants reported having sexual fantasies, which they use to enhance arousal, reduce stress, and even to fulfill emotional needs such as trust and closeness.

These fantasies may overlap with behavior but are separate from actual desire. The separations of behavior and desire can help in understanding how fantasies function psychologically and socially. Understanding these mechanisms provide perception into emotional responses, and the symbolic meanings individuals attach to sexual scenarios. Some research highlights seven core themes that characterize sexual fantasies, including taboo elements. These taboo fantasies offer a unique window into sexual interests with no real-world constraints. The arousal often comes from the potential consequence of pregnancy and not actual impregnation. In some cases, the risk itself is the main component of sexual arousal. It is the possibility of pregnancy that can add a sense of vulnerability and intimacy that some find exciting. Skakoon-Sparling, Cramer, and Super (2016) conducted an experiment in which participants would watch video clips depicting sexual acts, with breaks every 2 minutes to play blackjack. What they found was that increased sexual arousal was associated with more risky plays, showing that a risk can heighten arousal. This relationship is similar to some instances of impregnation fetishism, where arousal comes from the possibility of getting pregnant, not from actually getting pregnant.

== Sociological perspectives ==
Western culture and society have historically placed a stigma on the topic of sexuality as a whole, which has made research surrounding fetishes, including breeding kinks extremely limited. Earlier psychological theories, including those influenced by Freud, often described unusual sexual interests as signs of internal conflict or a psychological flaw, which contributed to the alienation of fetish communities. As a result of Freuds ideas, individuals in society found it difficult to have conversations about sexual practices that were not traditional or for reproductive purposes. This idea of being sexually deviant caused individuals with fetishes not to discuss it during this time period, thus the limited research.

More recent work from the sociological perspective suggests that attitudes toward sexuality have become less restrictive in different settings. As kinks become more visible, individuals involved in these local communities and social groups are more likely to discuss their interests openly and form supportive networks. The presence of more spaces to discuss kinks and fetishes in different communities allow individuals to discuss aspects of sexuality and different sexual preferences in a safe space. These shifts make it easier for researchers to understand a wider range of sexual kinks, including impregnation fetishes.

Research on the reaction by different communities to the AIDS crisis demonstrate how sexual cultures rally together when it comes to sexual health. At this time, kink communities created education networks that advocated for safe sexual practices and the intent of avoiding risks. It is noted that these education networks were powerful and caused for a closer community without judgment. Although there is little research on strategies aimed towards practices for impregnation fetishisms, the activism created from kink communities proved the importance of addressing risks and promoting safety especially in kink communities.

Studies also draw on broader research about unintended pregnancy to understand the potential social effects of behaviors associated with impregnation themes. Studies show that unintended pregnancies can lead to economic effects, reduced access to care, and higher rates of unsafe abortion and maternal health risks in various contexts. These findings are not specific to impregnation fetish communities but help explain fetishes within wider social and cultural discussions about sexuality, risk, kinks, and sexual health.

Overall, the impregnation fetish is influenced heavily by historical, social, and cultural factors rather than just being a personal preference. Stigmatized views on differing sexual interests affects research done on kinks, such as impregnation fetishes as these views link back to the comfort level of individuals discussing kinks and different sexual practices, thus resulting in limited research. Although impregnation fetishes have not been heavily studied, research done on different kinks, sexual cultures and communities, and safe sex practices allow a greater sense of fetishes and their communities. Additionally, the research available allows for a sense of how fetishes have evolved and how they work in a sociological perspective historically and in modern times. The shift in community and attitudes towards sexual practices and kinks over time shows how cultural ideals affect the way individuals express their sexual interests.
