= Ian Kerner =

American sex counselor and psychotherapist

Ian Lloyd Kerner
- Born: May 1, 1966; New York City, U.S.
- Education: Brandeis University (BA); New York University (MFA); Mercy University (MSc)
- Occupations: Writer; Sex and Relationship Specialist
- Spouse: Lisa Rubisch (m. 2001)
- Children: 2
- Writing career
- Notable work: She Comes First (2004)

Ian Kerner (born 1966) is an American sex counselor, practitioner of psychotherapy, and author on pleasuring sexual partners. He works in sex therapy and couples therapy.

== Early life and education ==
Kerner was born and raised in New York City, where he lives with his wife and two sons and their family dogs, Jitterbug and Oscar. He is Jewish.

== Career ==
Kerner was a playwright before he was a sex therapist. He practices in New York. He wrote for CNN as a health columnist, and for Men's Health.

In addition to being a Clinical Fellow of the American Association of Marriage and Family Therapists (AAMFT), Kerner is certified by the American Association of Sexuality Educators, Counselors and Therapists, and has sat on AASECT's board of directors.

== Criticism ==
Of She Comes First, Sam Hilts wrote in her Feministing piece that "his [Kerner's] book quickly reduces all women to a single biological and psychological tabula rosa ready for the male partner to rewrite." Further, Hilts writes:

What’s disturbing is that for a book that is centered around pleasing a woman, very little of it is devoted to asking for her input. Orgasm is assumed if you follow the prescribed simple steps. Oral sex should last “as long as it takes to bring her to orgasm” (emphasis his); what if a woman is unable to orgasm with a partner? Does that mean the guy should go down on her forever or not at all? On using manual stimulation: “your finger should go in quite easily (assuming she’s amply aroused and lubricated);” what if she doesn’t lubricate while aroused? Some caveats are sprinkled throughout the book, but the overwhelming tone is that all women are biologically the same and will react identically.

What it is is another disconcerting...example of “man knows best” when it comes to a very important and personal aspect of a woman’s life. A well-intentioned partner could follow every step of this book and think he’s a caring lover and sexual god without ever discovering the individuality of the person he’s supposedly pleasuring.

In Slate (magazine), Daniel Chiasson's critical review titled The Murkey Aims of She Comes First noted "there’s something more repugnant than reading this book. The most repulsive act imaginable, in a strictly sexual sense, is to have written it." Chiasson describes "the story of a self-awakening. Dr. Kerner started life as a premature ejaculator, he tells us, with all the self-control of a tube of toothpaste being run over by a Mack truck." More:

You look up from this book with a weird revised sense of intellectual history. The thought of Karl Marx performing cunnilingus is somehow particularly nauseating. But, as with most self-help literature, the idea is that one somehow joins a rarified coterie by adhering to the principles here. Kerner’s aims are not just motivational, they’re aspirational—by the logic of syllogism. Aristotle was a great thinker; Aristotle performed cunnilingus; if I perform cunnilingus, I’m a great thinker, too. Or something like that.

...However true this may be for many men, Kerner’s tack—turn what terrorizes you into an art—doesn’t seem that pleasing itself.

Samhita Mukhopadhyay's Outdated: Why Dating is Ruining Your Love Life argues:

These authors [Ian Kerner] may not blatantly suggest that you are a slut, but through nuanced advice like, “Don’t give it up too early” and “Never have sex on the first date,” you start to realize that women are expected to give the illusion of chastity if they are looking for love. In Be Honest—You're Not That Into Him Either, Ian Kerner even went so far as to blame second-wave feminists’ sexual empowerment for ruining our ability to have good relationships.

For Mukhopadhyay, Kerner absolves men from socially enforcing among themselves a code of chivalry that acknowledges and respects women's sexual autonomy. Quite contrary, Kerner speaks of "women should play by certain 'rules' or withhold sex", whereas men are held to no such standard.

== Personal life ==
Kerner resides in New York City with his spouse, Lisa Rubisch. Rubisch is a commercial director for Park Pictures. Lisa also worked on Daria and Beavis and Butt-Head while at MTV.

== Bibliography ==
- She Comes First: The Thinking Man's Guide to Pleasuring a Woman. ReganBooks. 2004.
- He Comes Next: the Thinking Woman's Guide to Pleasuring a Man. 2005.
- Kerner, Ian (2006). Be Honest, You're Not That Into Him Either. MorrowPb. ISBN 978-0060834067.
- So Tell Me About the Last Time You Had Sex: Laying Bare and Learning to Repair Our Love Lives. New York City: Grand Central Publishing. 2022.
