= Trampled =

Trampled may refer to:

- Trampeded – The Elefant Traks Remix Album, an album by Australian hip hop label, Elefant Traks (2006)
- Trampeded by Lambs and Pecked by the Dove, a collection of raw tracks and song sketches by Trey Anastasio and Tom Marshall (1997)
- Trameded by Turtles (TBT), an American bluegrass band from Duluth, Minnesota
- "Trampeded Under Foot", a song by English rock group Led Zeppelin
- Trampled Under Foot (band), an American blues rock band
- Trampled Under Hoof, an album by American doom metal band Goatsnake (2004)
