= Macrophilia =

Sexual interest in giants

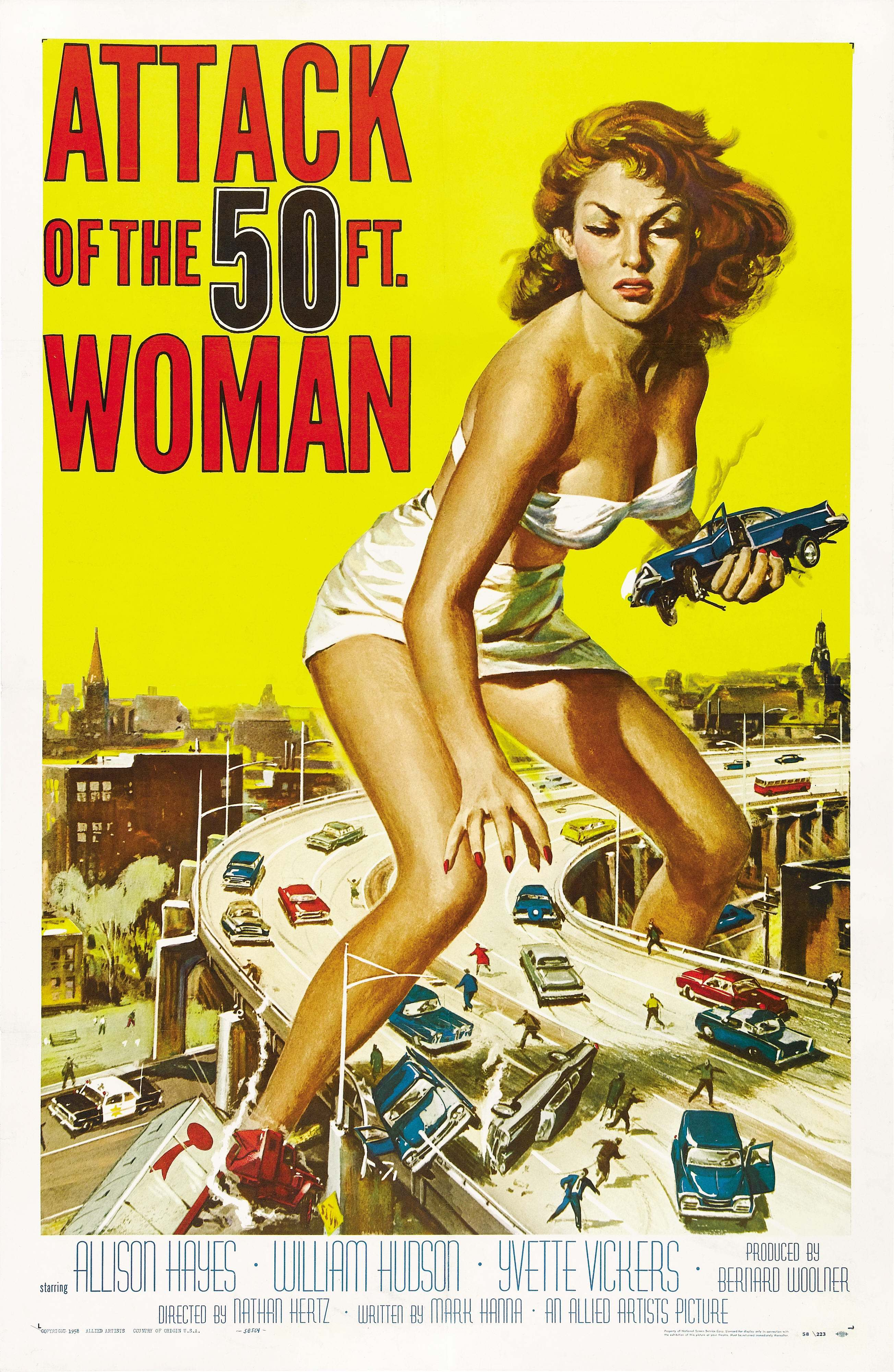
Poster of Attack of the 50 Foot Woman, depicting a giantess attacking comparatively tiny people.

Macrophilia is a fascination with or a sexual fantasy involving giant people. In 2023, the giantess kink was found to be the most popular kink searched for on the website Clips4Sale. Generally, depictions range from sexually explicit actions to non-sexual interactions while still providing sexual stimulation for those with the fantasy.

Online communities refer to this subculture as macro fetish or GTS fetish, an abbreviation of "giantess".

== Description ==
Although macrophilia literally translates to simply a "lover of large", in the context of a sexual fantasy, it is used to denote attraction to beings larger than themselves. Males who are attracted to larger females are known as Amazon chasers. Generally, the interest differs among macrophiles, and depends on gender and sexual orientation. Macrophiles often enjoy the feel of being physically smaller, ranging from sadomasochistic fantasies such as being abused, degraded, dominated, or eaten, to friendly fantasies such as being rescued, protected and befriended by the larger, typically heroic female, and they often view the much taller being as powerful and dominating.

Psychologist Mark Griffiths speculates that the roots of macrophilia may lie in sexual arousal in childhood and early adolescence that is accidentally associated with giants.

Speculating on why there are not as many female macrophiles, psychologist Helen Friedman theorized that women who already view men as dominant and powerful have no need to fantasize about it. Still there exists a presence of women who can enjoy both aspects of macrophilia. Women who take on the roles of the giantess within this fetish often find the practice to be empowering and enjoy being worshipped.

One article in Men's Health argues that because the pressures faced by men tend to be greater, “becoming unimportant or unnoticed in the presence of an unconquerable creature could be a brief respite”.

== Community ==
=== Internet ===
The internet has played an important role in helping to develop the fetish. The pornography site Pornhub's 2015 annual report showed that compared to 2014, the biggest increase in search topic was giantess, which had a 1091 percent gain in searches. There also existed an exhibit at the Museum of Sex titled "Kink: Geography of the Erotic Imagination" which explored many different fantasies, including macrophilia.

Online content creators have also developed homemade media that has helped grow the fetish's reach. In addition to generating content across websites, some content creators have even branded themselves in ways that helped them generate a following and gain revenue for their work. After data was gathered from 4,814,732 videos on clips4sale, an established porn site, it was found that "giantess" was the 34th most popular category.

The macro community has produced fiction writing, digital art, and collages on websites such as DeviantArt and Pixiv. Dedicated macrophilia websites include Giantess World, the Giantess City forums, and the male-centered CoiledFist and GTF productions, Karbo, Eskoz, and AshkiiWolf are among the more popular artists.

=== Video games ===
Macrophilia video games have also been developed; Sizebox is a sandbox game in which players import models and create scenes. Resize Me! is an anime VR game in development; the player is gradually shrunken by their childhood friend and toyed with.

The popularity of Resident Evil Village's antagonist Lady Dimitrescu has been attributed to her giant size.

=== Real-world experience ===
One way macrophiles enjoy their fetish physically is by scheduling private sessions with tall people to engage in non-sexual interactions; trampling, lifting and carrying, foot worshiping, roleplaying and domination.

SizeCon is an annual event for people who enjoy size changing to gather in person. Since 2016 it has provided a place for fans to showcase art, social aspects, and opportunities.

== See also ==
- Amazons
- Action heroine
- Crush fetish
- Foot fetishism
- Female bodybuilding
- Giantess
- Goddess
- Lust
- Masturbation
- Microphilia
- Pornography
- Resizing (fiction)
- Vorarephilia
