= Foot fetishism =

Sexual fascination with feet

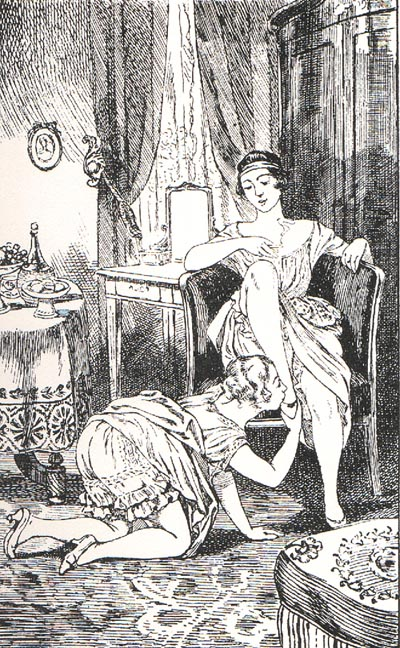
The Countess with the whip (1926), an illustration by Martin van Maële

Foot fetishism, also known as foot partialism or podophilia, refers to a sexual interest in feet. Similar to other fetishes, individuals with a foot fetish experience varying degrees of sexual attraction to feet, from merely viewing the foot as a pleasing part of the human body alongside other parts, to sexual activity involving feet being the only way that the fetishist can climax. In 2006, it was the most commonly discussed type of partialist fantasy in pornographic Internet forums, and is the most common type of culturally atypical body part partialism, (Note: "Atypical" in this context refers to body parts other than the genitals, buttocks, and breasts.) with studies estimating it to affect 14% of Americans in some way, though the amount of individuals who are only able to or usually prefer to climax to feet is likely smaller. It is most common in men, with a slight increase in gay and bisexual men, and is least common in heterosexual women.

The appeal of foot fetishism as with other fetishes is idiosyncratic, common reasons cited by foot fetishists in studies include an element of humiliation and domination, the sensitivity of the feet and its usage as an erogenous zone in sex, and as part of a greater form of olfactophilia due to foot odor. Traditional attitudes related to femininity and masculinity have also been noted in terms of symbolic parts of the fetish. The cause of any type of fetishism is largely speculative, but is thought to be a complex interplay of events in prenatal neurodevelopment, cultural, and psychodynamic factors. Issues with the brain such as epilepsy and lesions can result in suddenly gaining or losing sexual interests, including fetishes like feet.

Foot fetishism, when it is not accompanied by antisocial expressions of the fetish such as burglary of footwear or non-consensual contact, or considerable psycho-social distress or impairment in daily life, is considered by contemporary psychiatric and medical institutions to be a valid expression of human sexuality and not pathological. The medical treatment of those with foot fetishism that is considered pathological is the same as other fetishes and paraphilias, which is primarily focused on reducing shame regarding the sexual fantasy in psychotherapy, and if absolutely needed, pharmacological treatments to reduce impulsive behavior such as SSRIs or medications that directly inhibit the sexual libido, such as antiandrogens, as well as the treatment of co-morbid disorders due to stress being a common trigger for impulsive sexual behavior.

== Characteristics ==
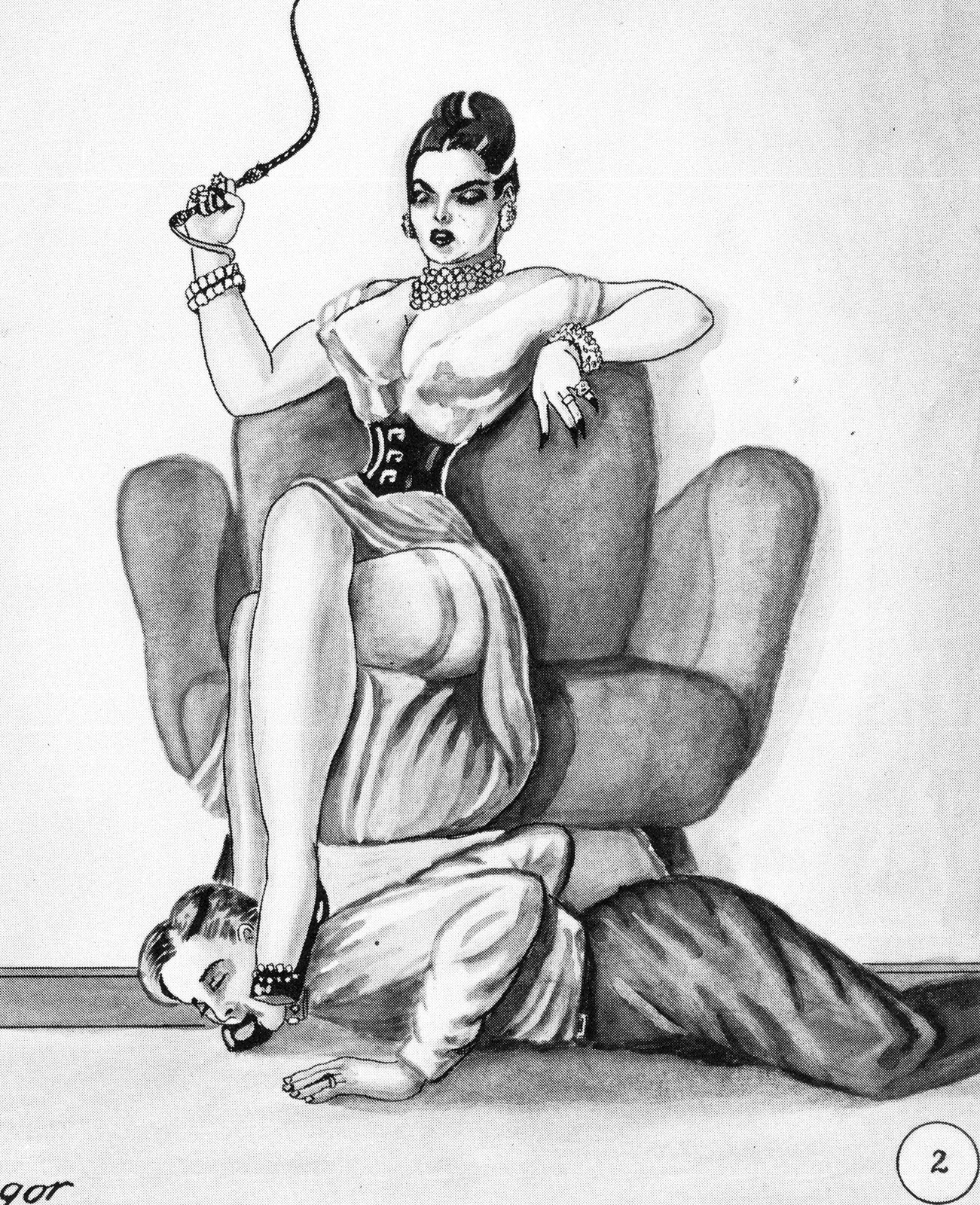
Illustration depicting foot worship in Bizarre Honeymoon (circa 1950)

For a foot fetishist, points of attraction may include the shape and size of feet, feet soles, toes, jewelry (such as toe rings or anklets), treatments (such as massaging, washing partner's feet, or painting partner's toenails), state of dress (such as barefoot, flip flops, or high heels), or sensory interaction (such as smelling, kissing, tickling, or rubbing of feet and genitals).

Foot fetishism is very often associated with worshipping and sexual dehumanization and sexual activities may be mixed with other fetishes, for example, some foot fetishists might also enjoy being stepped or trampled on, however not all fetishists who enjoy being treated as carpets have a specific arousal towards feet.

In a 1994 study, 45% of those with a foot fetish were found to be aroused by smelly socks or foot odor.

== Relative frequency ==
To estimate the relative occurrence of fetishes, in 2006 researchers at the University of Bologna examined 381 Internet discussions of fetish groups, in which at least 5,000 people had been participating. Researchers estimated the prevalence of different fetishes based on the following elements:

- (a) the number of discussion groups devoted to a particular fetish;
- (b) the number of individuals participating in the groups;
- (c) the number of messages exchanged.

It was concluded that the most common fetishes were for body parts or for objects usually associated with body parts (33% and 30%, respectively). Among those people preferring body parts, feet and toes were preferred by the greatest number, with 47% of those sampled preferring them. Among those people preferring objects related to body parts, 32% were in groups related to footwear (shoes, boots, etc.).

According to Ian Kerner, foot fetishism is the most common form of sexual fetish related to the body.

In August 2006, AOL released a database of the search terms submitted by their subscribers. In ranking only those phrases that included the word "fetish", it was found that the most common search was for feet.

Foot fetishism may be more common in men than in women. Researchers using a polling agency to conduct a survey of the general Belgian population as part of an effort to chart interest in BDSM in 2017 found that 76 of the 459 male respondents (17%) and 23 of the 565 female respondents (4%) answered "Agree" or "Strongly agree" to a fetish interest in feet in the whole sample of both controls and kinksters, with a correlation towards the S&M group alongside other fetishes noted such as leather and latex.

In "Tell Me What You Want" by Justin Lehmiller, about 14% of all American respondents of both sexes claimed to have had a sexual fantasy involving feet at least once in their life. In his study, gay and bisexual men were the most likely to have sort of fetishism of feet, and heterosexual women were the least likely. He stressed that the number of those with a high amount of foot fetishism (those who are only able to climax from feet or prefer feet compared to other types of activity) are likely lower than the study rate, and that cultural taboos regarding feet may be a reason for choosing feet in sexual activity (the subjects may not necessarily have involved feet from sexual arousal to the object itself), with a general pattern of the "American id" being focused on intentionally breaking social norms in sexual activities.

Foot fetishism of some sort is much more common in Iran, with about 76% of Iranian men and 28% of Iranian women reporting some sort of interest in feet during sex.

== Causes ==
Similar to other forms of sexual fetishism and other paraphilias, no consensus has yet been established about the specific causes of foot fetishism. While many works on the topic exist, their conclusions are often regarded as highly speculative. Currently widely accepted etiological models hypothesize paraphilias to originate from a complex set of neurological, cultural, and psychodynamic factors in a given person. Different paraphilias may have different causes, and there is no guarantee that two persons with the same paraphilias as the other would be interested in the same aspects of it or have the same ultimate cause for its development. For example, some individuals with a foot fetish are attracted to foot odor, while others are not. Culturally, ideas on practices regarding "beautiful feet" often influence the types of foot fetishes that are developed in that society, such as foot binding fetishism in China.

=== Neurological ===
A 2D diagram of the cortical homunculus. V.S. Ramachandran hypothesized that the genital areas being closest to areas related to sensory processing of the foot are a potential explanation for some or all cases of foot fetishism.

==== Sensory neuron theory ====
The cortical homunculus is a "map" of sensory and motor neurons. Neuroscientist V. S. Ramachandran proposed that the closeness of genital-related neurons to neurons regulating sensory and motor functions in the toes and feet may lead to foot fetishism. Ramachandran did not provide experimental evidence for this claim in his original work.

A 2013 study involving 800 subjects criticized this hypothesis, showing that there was very little neuronal activation from foot stimulation or inter-correlation between foot regions and others, as well as issues regarding Ramachandran's usage of the cortical homunculus model to explain the core of foot fetishism. (Note: The main criticism of the neural cross-talk model that the cited paper gave out is that Ramachandran had inappropriately characterized the sensory cortex as a place where "concepts" of the body parts are stored with the brain, when in actuality they merely cover tactile sensations of an individual, which clashes with the fact that foot fetishism is aroused via visual stimuli to feet in general, which would not interact with the tactile systems in any matter. The cortical sensory neurons control sensory information of one's own system, which would conflict with the idea that sexual arousal to another persons feet is linked to "cross-talk". Even if cross-talk occurred, the paper argues that the neurons implicated being primarily related to tactile sensory perception would mean that there would be no way for them to influence someone's "opinion" on a body part, implying that an individual with a hypothetical case of cross-talk, regardless of their reported symptoms, would likely not have a foot fetish influenced by their case, if one is developed at all.) The study also conducted a meta-analysis that showed that there are no known cases of erotic stimuli being produced from neurostimulation in the cortex.

The authors did not rule in or out that other areas relating to emotional or erogenous stimulation may have been involved. The other proposed brain areas for researching into similar sensory zones in the study were the thalamus, the periaqueductal gray, and the insula, which are all connected to erogenous zones and have complex relations to sexuality, emotions, and prosocial behavior. These areas primarily develop prenatally.

==== Temporal-lobe mechanisms ====
In extremely rare cases of lateral temporal lobe epilepsy, foot fetishism and other paraphilias are known to spontaneously occur. These episodes are often characterized by extremely sexually impulsive behavior, such as a foot fetishist with epilepsy licking the feet of others unprompted, stealing items of sexual interest (in this scenario, footwear) and public masturbation or sexually assaulting hospital staff in those whom are institutionalized. The vast majority or all of the fetishism and impulsive behavior immediately disappears once treatment of the epilepsy occurs, leading to the hypothesis that the temporal lobe may have a key role in fetishism and other paraphilias. It is common for people with epilepsy to report significant changes in sexuality after a lobectomy of one or both of their temporal lobes, with a rarer amount documenting a perceived wiping of an existing sexual interest or a new one occurring. A case study of a man with a fetish for safety-pins in early childhood who later on developed absence seizures became well known after a coincidental surgery to fix the epilepsy ended up accidentally ridding him of his fetishism towards safety-pins.

In a case study of two intellectually disabled adults who had severe forms of foot and shoe fetishism since early childhood that involved sexually assaulting others by licking and touching the feet and shoes of complete strangers, the usage of carbamazepine for temporal lobe epilepsy detected during a screening accidentally caused a complete cessation of any fetishism of the feet in one of the subjects and caused partial remission of foot fetishism in the other, while completely stopping the impulsive sexual behavior.

Temporal lobe dysfunction has been noted in studies regarding other paraphilias such as pedophilia and those with hyposexuality. The relation between the temporal lobe and sexual dysfunction, or why fetishes can sometimes be wiped or gained from dysfunction of the temporal lobe, are poorly understood.

Other brain lesions have also been noted to affect sexuality and fetishism in different ways, with hypothalamic lesions being a similar example to the symptoms experiences in temporal lobe epilepsy.

=== Conditioning and social learning ===
Mechanisms regarding classical and operant conditioning have been proposed as potential explanation for how links between fetishistic objects like feet can become sexualized over time. For example, a future fetishist may notice a correlation between feet and footwear like high-heels and other sexually appealing attributes, which when viewed over and over again, result in development of the fetish. Masturbation is a proposed explanation for how the fetish sustains itself into adulthood once it initially appears. Personality traits linked to susceptibility to conditioning such as introversion have been correlated in fetishists, who are hypothesized to be more susceptible to noticing the correlation between the fetish object and other sexual stimuli due to increased internal thinking regarding the stimuli.

The correlation between sexual fetishism and personality is often debated in terms of what factors matter for development. A large scale Swedish study had found that those who had less interest in romantic parts of a relationship and rated themselves as being more dissatisfied with life were more likely to have partialist and general fetishism and other paraphilias, and that those who responded positively to having an atypical sexual interest were more likely to have others. Fetishists were more likely to suffer from substance use disorders, masturbated more frequently in adolescence and in the present, and reported less opportunities for hands-on romantic or sexual activity in adolescence, regardless of their sexual performance in adulthood.

In a study of 262 homosexual and bisexual males who were part of a foot fetishist organization in the 1990s, Wernberg et al. found that while 80% respondents did not report child abuse (unlike some other paraphiliac classes like biastophiliac respondents), about half reported "no significant friendships" in adolescence, and of about 20% of respondents who felt comfortable answering open-ended questions about the development of their fetish reported various scenarios, with the only commonality being the association between articles of clothing, sneakers and feet being part of individuals they found attractive or with sex. Wernberg claimed that the study showed a cultural and personalized cause of foot fetishism due to the selectivity of scenarios regarding feet, with examples such as that over 60% of respondents attracted to shoes reporting that they would not be interested in unworn shoes (with the rest saying that they preferred to fantasize about the potential wearer of one in thrift stores or in photos on magazines), and that the subjective attractiveness of the person with the foot or shoes mattered. Foot fetishists also psychologically clustered different types of shoewear to different classes of people that they found attractive, with sneaker fetishists often associating them with young gay men and boots with domineering men. About 75% of the shoe fetishists said that the attributes of the wearer, alongside the shoes, were necessary for arousal. The social and gender implications of the wearer of the shoes/bearer of the feet were also important to the fetishists.

Wernberg showed that like with other paraphilic interests, many of the foot fetishists had other paraphilic sexual interests, with about 66% reporting having engaged in BDSM at some point in their lives, and about 30% of them saying that "all or most" sexual contact involving feet from them was as part of a greater role as a sadist/masochist in sexual roleplay. About 58% also were attracted to clothing and undergarments, particularly the smell. Foot fetishists are usually able to get some form of sexual partner to comply with their foot fetish unlike other particular fetishes, which Wernberg puts primarily on the commonality of shoewear and footwear as a sign of sex in Western culture and the relative innocence of the fetish perceived by the public in comparison to others that may be seen as more disturbing or offensive. The psychodynamic portrayal of fetishists as often having been either socially or sexually isolated teenagers who developed the fetish as part of sexual daydreaming about the sex most preferred to their sexual orientation and/or those exposed to the object in a sexual way that felt positive at an early age was used as an explanation for the 50% rate of social withdrawal by Wernberg, as well as a case study of a foot fetishist in 1979 who reported the former model of development as a child.

A small-scale study of heterosexual participants assigned heterosexual men a series of women, where they were then asked which one they wanted to date. If rejected, they continued the process over and over until accepted, and those who were accepted were asked to continue with the date independently outside of the study if they wished. Compared to a small non-fetishistic control group, men who were rejected more often were more likely to rate the feet, legs, undergarments, lingerie and legs of women in pornographic pictures they were given to be much more arousing on their own versus men who got accepted closer to the beginning of the study and the control group. The study aimed to test whether or not personality factors could be an antecedent of partialism and fetishism as a whole. The suggested mechanism is that fetishists aim their erotic feelings towards body parts associated with potential partners, rather than the psychological concept of a romantic or sexual relationship with the partner in an example of adaptive social learning theory and operant conditioning, where the fetishist learns to divert their sexual expectations elsewhere as part of a learnt behavior.

==== Individual and sociological factors ====
Foot fetishes, particularly what a fetishist with one would consider to be sexually arousing characteristics of the feet themselves, and potentially whether they develop it or not can be molded by the society that they are raised in, with some societies having normalized certain rituals involving the feet as sex symbols or displays of the feminine beauty ideal in that particular culture. Homosexual males with a foot fetish often remark that the bigger size and lack of feminine characteristics of the male foot render it as a sex symbol of masculinity, akin to parts such as the penis, with the opposite occurring in bisexual fetishists, who often remarked that feminine aspects of the foot and add-ons such as high-heels and polish rendered it a symbol of femininity in their minds.

Sensory experiences such as licking and smelling foot odor were rated as arousing because of their perceived intimacy. The massaging of the feet of a partner or attempting to apply pleasing sensory experiences to the feet to please their partner was considered arousing by some foot fetishists in surveys, as they deemed the feet to be a private, erogenous zone for foreplay. Being dominated was also listed as a reason for enjoying feet during sex, with the mental concept of the feet as a dirty area and its usage by a sadistic dominant to be a key part of this particular fantasy.

Iranians are significantly more likely to say that they have an interest in feet than Westerners, which an Iranian research group attributed to the role of foot hygiene in Islam and the sex-negative culture in Iran, with over 76% of Iranian males reporting other object and body part fetishes other than feet as well. The authors criticized the current literature available as having an overly Western focus and a psychiatric focus as a form of cultural bias in studies.

Justin Lehmiller has commented that in his American surveys of sexuality, people who report "taboo" fetishes such as feet and others are more likely to be religious, to be socially conservative, and to have felt sexually repressed in some way during childhood, which he attributes to Western attitudes on sex, particularly conservative attitudes that these subjects would've heard the most of, often causing people under them to feel as if they need to "break out" and intentionally break norms and attitudes in society in private in order to express themselves, which he calls the "American id" of attitudes regarding sex.

=== Imprinting ===
Desmond Morris considered foot fetishism the result of mal-imprinting at an early age, the tactile pressure of a foot or shoe being important in this. Sigmund Freud's reading of foot fetishism also involved early imprinting, but he considered the smell of feet significant in this.

==== Krafft-Ebing's imprinted memories ====
Richard von Krafft-Ebing in his book Psychopathia Sexualis attributed the cause of fetishes like foot fetishes to be largely due to childhood events which "imprint" erotic memories related to the object via either accidental association or a mental correlation between the object and concomitant sexual activity. The initial "spark" is forgotten, while the sexual feeling is then transferred to adulthood. Krafft-Ebing claimed that hand and foot fetishism were largely correlated with other paraphilias in his other case studies, particularly sadism and masochism.

==== John Money's "lovemap" theory ====
The lovemap theory by John Money attempts to explain sexual interests in terms of a "map" of what an individual finds erotic. He hypothesized that all humans possess innate concepts of what they find attractive that are unique to them and are developed over time during childhood and puberty. Forced hyposexuality (or forced avoidance of an object), abuse, lack of sexual play or messaging regarding sexual intercourse, or an otherwise non-sexual event that is paired with sexual stimuli (i.e a coincidental erection) are hypothesized root causes for culturally alien atypical sexuality and fetishism under this model. Another explanation proposed for fetishism is that an early childhood event that is mistakenly implanted by the brain as typical sexual stimuli for the lovemap may be discovered later as an adult via pornography or self experimentation.

When classifying paraphilias, Money had claimed that sexual expressions of fetishism and paraphilias are the individual in question attempting to reconcile with the societal disgust, illegality, or negative internal feelings they may have regarding the paraphilia/fetish. Under the lovemap model, Money suggests that fetishism results from a conflict where the individual must weigh the taboo of the fetish from their culture and their unique sexual needs as a human being. Fetishism is the result of the individual attempting to gain control of what they believe to be a transgression of their sexual needs, where they replace the socially acceptable lover with the object to save society from their taboo while claiming victory. Due to social pressure, the individual must repeat this ritual repeatedly, which reinforces the fetish without ultimately satisfying the need for independence.

=== Psychodynamic ===
==== Anatomical baseness of the foot ====
Georges Bataille saw the lure of the feet as linked to their anatomical baseness (abjection).

==== Castration complex ====
Sigmund Freud saw the fetishism of toes on the foot as a surrogate for the penis that served as a primitive psychological defense against the fear of the shattering of the castration complex (and a defense against the resulting castration anxiety), which is the belief that men and women both have penises that Freud hypothesized was a key part of the phallic stage of his model of human development, which in the same model is later shattered, marking the end of the phallic stage. Otto Fenichel similarly saw castration fear as significant in foot fetishism, citing a future fetishist who as an adolescent said to himself "You must remember this throughout life – that girls, too, have legs", to protect himself from the fear. Where fear of the (castrated) female body is too great, desire is felt not for shoes on female feet but for women's shoes alone, without women.

=== Health and disease ===
Some researchers have hypothesized that foot fetishism increases as a response to epidemics of sexually transmitted infections. In one study, conducted by A. James Giannini at Ohio State University, an increased interest in feet as sexual objects was observed during the great gonorrhea epidemic of twelfth-century Europe, and the syphilis epidemics of the 16th and 19th centuries in Europe. In the same study, the frequency of foot-fetish depictions in pornographic literature was measured over a 30-year interval. An exponential increase was noted during the period of the current AIDS epidemic. In these cases, sexual footplay was viewed as a safe sex alternative. However, the researchers noted that these epidemics overlapped periods of relative female emancipation.

== Psychiatry ==
Foot fetishism by itself is not considered to be an issue under contemporary psychiatric guidelines. It may however need treatment with psychotherapy, an SSRI and/or antiandrogen therapy if the individual either has extreme distress related to the fetish that is causing troubles with living, such as excessive impulsive purchases of fetish wear, or if the individual engages with non-consensual contact with others to fulfill the fetish or engages in contact with others that are not generally considered to be able to consent to sexual activity, such as children and the intellectually disabled. The DSM considers six months of these symptoms at minimum to be a sufficient time for a diagnosis to occur. Treating co-morbid disorders (if present) is usually advised, as stress can trigger impulsive behavior and lead to the individual using a paraphilia as a compulsive way to de-stress. There is no time limit needed for the ICD entries for fetishism.

== Society and culture ==
Some of the earliest recorded instances of foot fetishism occur in the erotic poems To a Barefoot Woman and To a Barefoot Boy attributed to the Ancient Greek writer Philostratus. The Hindu god Brahma was aroused by the sight of Parvati's feet in the eighth-century text Skanda Purana.

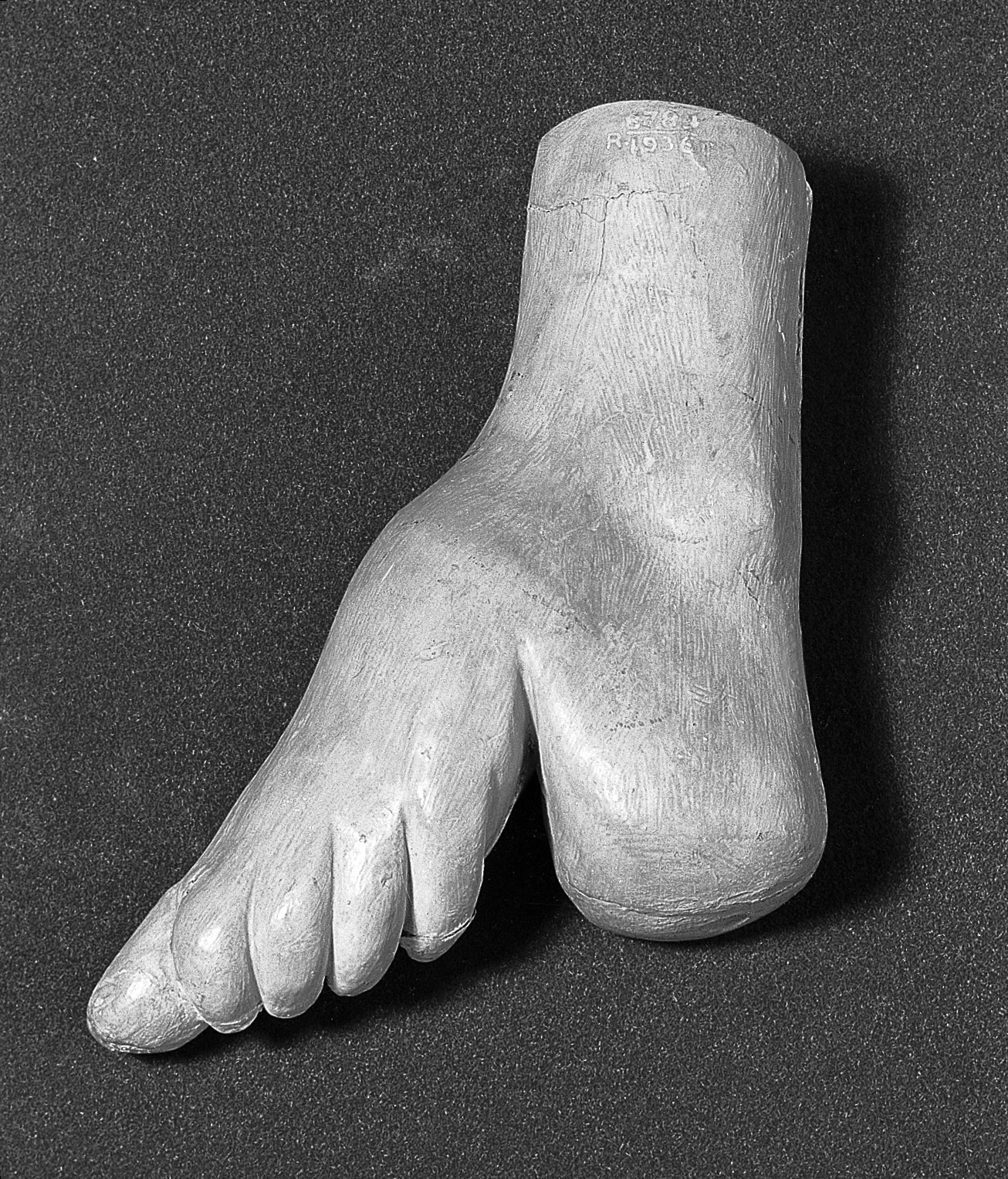
A cast of the foot of a woman who underwent foot binding from infancy. The physical deformities seen here were fetishized frequently in Ancient China. Chinese men would often lick the heels and toes of women with bound feet, and took pleasure in the odor generated from the small shoes used during the process. Despite its symbol as a sign of wealth and feminine beauty, women with bound feet were often permanently disabled from walking normally and suffered gangrene of the extremities.

In ancient China, foot binding was considered to be a sign of great wealth and sexual beauty in the women who had the practice done to them, despite the severe physical side effects and the high risk of medical sequelae like gangrene that often accompanied it. Young Chinese girls would often be forced under threats of physical punishment to have their foot bound in a tiny shoe, which would usually build up malodorous scents over the summer, originating from the sweat from body and environmental heat, and blood and pus from the painful deformations caused by the binding and tightness of the shoe and infections originating in the toes, caused by ischemia from the bandaging, which was often placed in the middle of the foot. The odor was considered to be sexually arousing by Chinese men, and licking the feet, sucking on the toes, and smelling the foot odor from the aforementioned process was a common practice with male partners of women who were forced to undergo the physical deformations. Chinese men considered the unique "lotus feet" from this process as an area of sexualized beauty, similar to how many cultures view the female breasts and buttocks, with historical Chinese erotic paintings considering them to be taboo and erotic enough that alongside other objects such as the breasts, they were not shown. The practice was so widespread and common that some Chinese provinces mandated all young girls born or married within their territories to be forcibly bound if not already done so. Up to 50% of Chinese women had bound feet, with levels nearing to 100% for wealthy ethnic Han Chinese women. Sigmund Freud considered this to be a major widespread case of foot fetishism within a society, particularly foot fetishism directed at the malodorous feet that was generated by the binding process. Since the 19th century, projects from religious missionaries and women's rights groups had resulted in the practice of foot binding being banned in China in 1919, with only a handful of elderly women from the era still being alive today. Foot binding fetishism as a whole in China has effectively died out.

Foot fetishists, alongside other fetishists, are often portrayed in TV shows and other media as sexually predatory people who commit sexual offenses. The vast majority of foot fetishists, however, include their fetishism in consensual sex. Some people in countries like the US and Australia view foot fetishism as unhealthy or disgusting, and personality attitudes regarding sexual morality and sexually conservative attitudes are largely correlated with reported disgust levels towards fetishism in general.

American film-maker Quentin Tarantino often includes forms of foot fetishism within pieces of media that he directs, and has made statements regarding the inclusion of feet in his films due to the attention it has received from film-buffs. He has called himself a "foot-fan" and has claimed to be fond of feet, though he has also stated in separate interviews that the inclusions of feet within his films are merely a part of his creative process and are not meant to be pornographic in nature.

== See also ==
- Body odour and sexual attraction
- Boot worship
- Crush fetish
- Elmer Batters
- Footjob
- Footsies
- Hand fetishism
- Partialism

== Sources ==
- Hickey, Eric W., ed. (2006). Sex crimes and paraphilia. Pearson Education. ISBN 978-0-13-170350-6. OCLC 1501008786. OL 18288386M.
