= Monkey hate =

Monkey hate is a form of zoosadism where humans have a hatred for monkeys, particularly macaque, and take pleasure in their suffering. The phenomenon drew public attention after a global monkey torture ring was uncovered by the BBC in 2023. It is predominantly seen on the Internet, with United States law enforcement noting an increase in interest during the COVID-19 pandemic. Despite numerous arrests in the United States, United Kingdom, and Indonesia, monkey hate videos continue to be circulated online. Individuals who consume monkey abuse content reportedly often cite macaques as a proxy for their hatred of young children or pregnant women, or consume the content for sexual gratification.

== Background and causes ==
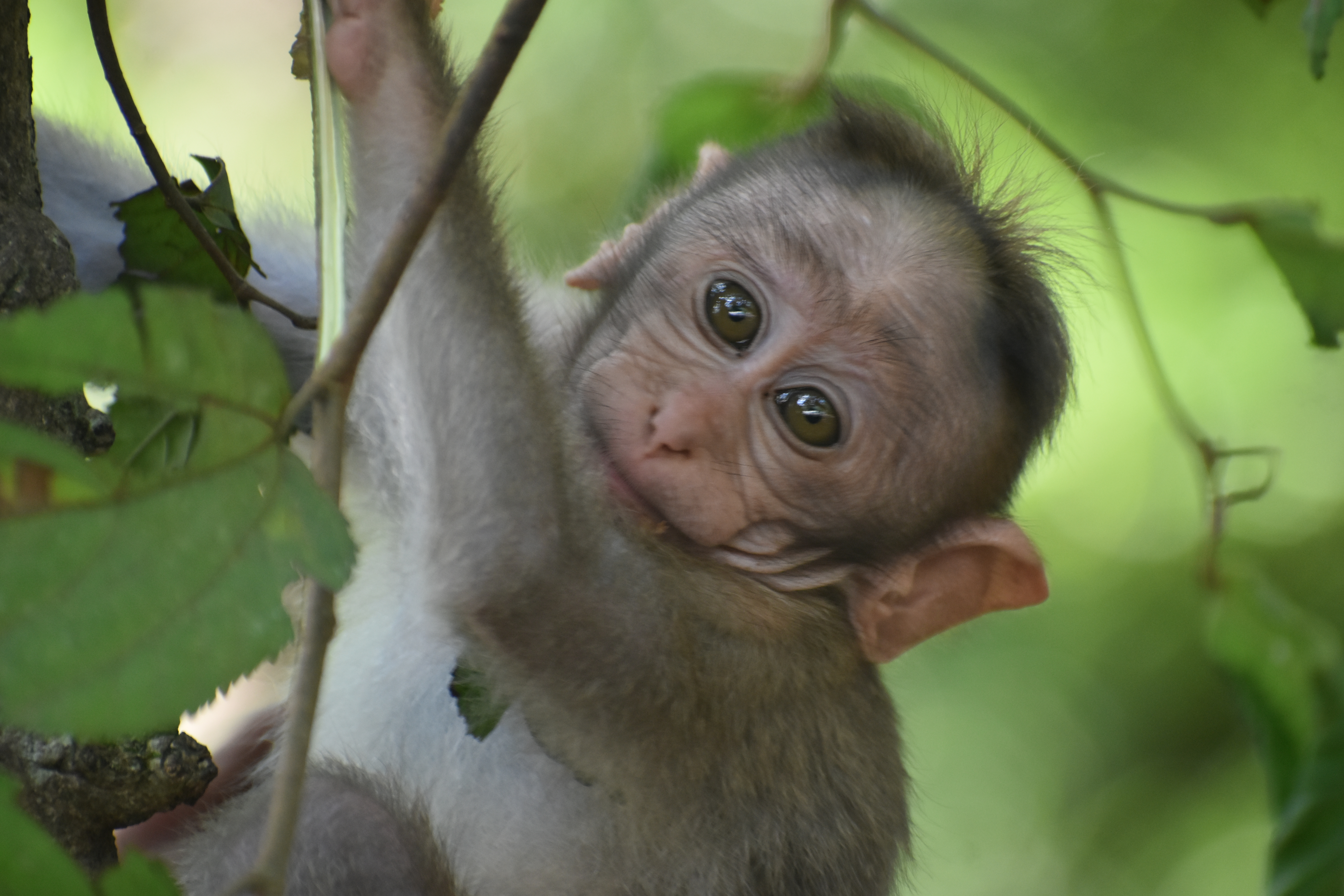
Baby macaques are the main target of abuse toward monkeys in online circles centered around monkey hate.

Videos of baby monkeys, particularly long-tailed macaques, being tortured or abused have been commonly uploaded to social media platforms such as YouTube and Facebook. In Southeast Asian countries where long-tailed macaques are native, they are often considered pests as a result of negative interactions with humans, and lack significant legal protections.

According to Chief Inspector Kevin Lacks-Kelly from the British National Wildlife Crime Unit, people who consume monkey torture content generally defend their actions as caused by a "hatred for pregnant women or small children". The Independent reported that macaques are used in abuse videos due to their perceived resemblance to human babies. Monkeys have also been tortured for viewers' sexual gratification, according to the Miami Herald. COVID-19 pandemic lockdowns driving people online were noted by United States federal law enforcement to have contributed to the phenomenon.

== Investigations and arrests ==
According to a September 2021–May 2023 study by Asia for Animals' Social Media Animal Cruelty Coalition (SMACC), videos by pet macaque owners had a total of 12.05 billion views online, with 12 percent of these videos involving intentional physical torture, 13 percent involving psychological abuse, and 60 percent involving direct physical abuse. Video titles have often contained broken English phrases such as "million pity" and "million sadness". Monkeys are often referred to within monkey hate communities as "tree rats", while videos are referred to as "sauce".

In 2021, a United States-based Telegram monkey torture group, Million Tears, was shut down after being brought to public attention. The group had about thirty members, who would pay owners of monkeys to abuse them. A continuation of the group, Ape's Cage, which involved around four hundred members, was uncovered by the BBC in 2023. Video operators who carried out the monkey torture were primarily based in Indonesia, while the members of the group were largely from the United States and other Western countries. Torture methods ranged from submerging monkeys in ice water to killing them in blenders, sawing them in half, or cutting off their tails and limbs.

Several notable members of Ape's Cage have been arrested, including American Michael "Torture King" McCartney and two British women, Holly LeGresley and Adriana Orme. "Mr. Ape", the pseudonymous leader of the group, has not been publicly identified. In Indonesia, a state civil servant, who possessed 58 monkey torture videos, was arrested. In spite of these arrests, monkey torture videos have continued to be circulated across different groups. As of July 2026, at least 30 participants had been indicted in the United States alone.

Animal welfare organizations such as Action for Primates and Lady Freethinker have been involved in investigating monkey hate groups. As a response to the monkey hate videos, Action for Primates lobbied in 2023 for animals to be included in the UK's Online Safety Bill.

== See also ==
- Hurtcore
- Zoosadism
