= Footwork (cricket) =

Footwork in the sport of cricket refers to the technique a batsman employs as he or she faces a delivery from the opposing bowler.

The two primary categories of conventional footwork include batsmen's shots played off the front foot, and shots played off the back foot. A right-handed batsman's front foot is the left; the back foot is the right. Typically, the conventional batsman will employ a front foot shot for deliveries of a fuller length (i.e., pitching closer to the batsman), and a back foot shot for deliveries of shorter length.

Because of the leverage the batsman can create with his or her feet, front foot shots usually result in the ball being played in front of the batsman, while back foot shots result in the ball being played behind the batsman's wicket. Many exceptions to this exist, however.

== See also ==
- Cricket terminology
- Batting (cricket)
