= Richard Holden (highway patrol) =

Col. Richard W. Holden, Sr. (died August 22, 2014) was the first African-American commander of the North Carolina State Highway Patrol. In 1969, he became one of the first six African Americans to join the Highway Patrol. Holden took charge of the Highway Patrol in 1999, following a series of scandals. He retired in 2004 after a 35-year career in law enforcement with the rank of colonel.

== Dates of rank ==
- 1984—first sergeant
- 1987—lieutenant
- 1990—captain
- 1993—major
- 1997—lieutenant colonel
- 1999—colonel

== Death ==
Holden died on Friday, August 22, 2014, at the age of 67. On August 27, 2014, all North Carolina flags were lowered to half-staff to honor him.
