= Animal Crush Video Prohibition Act of 2010 =

2010 United States bill

The Animal Crush Video Prohibition Act of 2010, Pub. L. 111–294 (text) (PDF), 124 Stat. 3177, enacted December 9, 2010, was a United States bill that addressed the banning of depictions of cruelty to animals to satisfy a crush fetish. The bill, H.R. 5566, was introduced by Rep. Elton Gallegly (R-CA), and primarily modified 18 U.S.C. § 48. The law was upheld by the Fifth Circuit Court of Appeals in USA v Richards.

== Background ==
The act revised the version of 18 U.S.C. § 48 that had entered into effect on December 9, 1999, which had been ruled an unconstitutional abridgment of the First Amendment right to freedom of speech by the Supreme Court. The previous law, placed into effect by Pub. L. 106–152 (text) (PDF), aimed at banning the publication, sale, and ownership of so-called "crush videos", which are films that feature a person or another animal crushing or trampling another smaller animal to death. In 2010, the Supreme Court ruled that the law was too vague and broad in United States v. Stevens, and, in an 8–1 decision, it ruled unconstitutional the 1999 law.
