= Footsies =

Form of flirtation

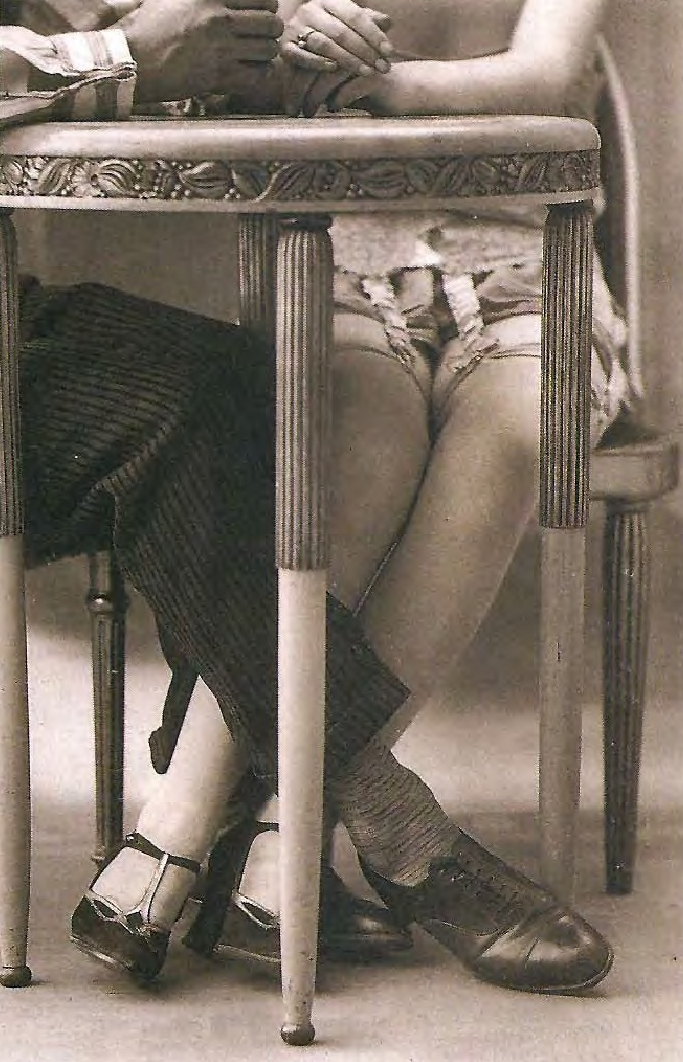
Two people playing footsies

Footsies (also footsy or footsie) is a flirting game where two people touch feet under a table or otherwise concealed place, often as a romantic prelude. It is a game played either as an act of flirtatious body language, or simply for enjoyment. Although footsies is not inherently romantic, the nature of it as playful touching is often done between romantic partners as a sign of affection, and most often without discussion. The term comes from a 1940s humorous diminutive of foot.

== Effects ==
In a 1994 study on secret relationships, participants (college students from the US) played a partnered card game in which a subset were instructed to play footsies with their card playing partner. Of these, individuals whose footsies was kept a secret rated the attractiveness of their partner significantly higher than either those who did not play footsies, or those whose footsies was publicly known.

== In popular culture ==
American comics author Robert Crumb published an autobiographic comic strip named "Footsy" in 1987 which deals with "his teenager encounters with the feet of various lusty creatures at school" and is a "typically self-lacerating portrayal of one of Crumb's myriad sexual fetishes".

== See also ==
- Public display of affection
