= United States v. Stevens =

- Supreme Court of the United States

Argued October 6, 2009 Decided April 20, 2010
- Full case name: United States v. Robert J. Stevens
- Docket no.: 08-769

Case history
- Prior: Motion to dismiss denied, No. 2:04-cr-00051-ANB (W.D. Pa. Nov. 10, 2004); defendant convicted; vacated, 533 F.3d 218 (3d Cir. 2008); cert. granted, 556 U.S. 1181 (2010).

Holding
- Depictions of animal cruelty are not categorically unprotected by the First Amendment.

Court membership
- Chief Justice John Roberts Associate Justices John P. Stevens · Antonin Scalia; Anthony Kennedy · Clarence Thomas; Ruth Bader Ginsburg · Stephen Breyer; Samuel Alito · Sonia Sotomayor

Case opinions
- Majority: Roberts, joined by Stevens, Scalia, Kennedy, Thomas, Ginsburg, Breyer, Sotomayor
- Dissent: Alito

Laws applied
- U.S. Const. amend. I; 18 U.S.C. § 48

United States v. Stevens, 559 U.S. 460 (2010), was a decision by the Supreme Court of the United States, which ruled that 18 U.S.C. § 48, a federal statute criminalizing the commercial production, sale, or possession of depictions of cruelty to animals, was an unconstitutional abridgment of the First Amendment right to freedom of speech.

After this ruling, the statute was revised by the Animal Crush Video Prohibition Act of 2010 to have much more specific language indicating it was intended only to apply to "crush videos."

== Background ==
Robert J. Stevens, an author and small-time film producer who presented himself as an authority on pit bulls, compiled and sold videotapes showing dogfights. Though he did not participate in the dogfights, he received a 37-month sentence under a 1999 federal law that banned trafficking in "depictions of animal cruelty."

=== District Court ===
Public Law No: 106-152 was a federal criminal statute that prohibited the knowing creation, sale, or possession of depictions of cruelty to animals with the intention of placing the depiction in interstate or foreign commerce for commercial gain. The law had been enacted in 1999, primarily to target "crush videos," which depicted people crushing small animals to gratify a sexual fetish. It excluded from prosecution "any depiction that has serious religious, political, scientific, educational, journalistic, historical, or artistic value." The language tracked the "Miller test," used by the U.S. Supreme Court to determine whether speech could be prosecuted for obscenity or was protected by the First Amendment.

In 2004, Stevens was indicted under 18 U.S.C. § 48 for creating and selling three video tapes, two of which depicted pit bulls engaged in dog fighting. The third tape depicted a pit bull attacking a domestic pig as part of the dog being trained to catch and kill wild hog and included "a gruesome depiction of a pit bull attacking the lower jaw of a domestic farm pig."

Although Stevens' criminal prosecution concerned only three tapes, he had made $20,000 in two and a half years from selling nearly 700 videos. Stevens was not accused of engaging in animal cruelty himself or of shooting the original footage from which the videos were created. However, the footage in each of the videos "is accompanied by introductions, narration and commentary by Stevens, as well as accompanying literature of which Stevens is the author."

Stevens filed a motion to dismiss the indictment by arguing that the federal statute abridged his right to freedom of speech under the First Amendment. The United States District Court for the Western District of Pennsylvania denied his motion in November 2004. In January 2005, Stevens was convicted by a jury, after a deliberation of 45 minutes.

=== Third Circuit ===
Stevens appealed, and the United States Court of Appeals for the Third Circuit vacated his conviction, holding that 18 U.S.C. 48 violated the First Amendment. The court stated that dog fighting and the use of dogs to hunt hogs may be made illegal to protect animals from cruelty.

=== Review by Supreme Court ===
The government asked the Supreme Court of the United States to overturn the appellate court ruling by appealing the case to the High Court. On April 20, 2009, the Supreme Court agreed to review the lower court's decision. Oral arguments in the case were heard on October 6, 2009.

Stevens' attorney, Washington, D.C., lawyer Patricia Millett, has written:

The notion that Congress can suddenly strip a broad swath of never-before-regulated speech of First Amendment protection and send its creators to federal prison, based on nothing more than an ad hoc balancing of the 'expressive value' of the speech against its 'societal costs' is entirely alien to constitutional jurisprudence and a dangerous threat to liberty.

In June 2009 the Animal Legal Defense Fund filed a brief in defense of the animals' interests. The brief encouraged the Court to recognize the protection of animals as a compelling government interest and to uphold Section 48.

More than a dozen media outlets joined an amicus brief in support of Stevens, including The New York Times, National Public Radio, the American Society of News Editors, the Association of Alternative Newsweeklies, Citizen Media Law Project, MediaNews Group, the National Press Photographers Association, the Newspaper Association of America, the Newspaper Guild–Communications Workers of America, Outdoor Writers Association of America, the Radio-Television News Directors Association, the Society of Environmental Journalists, and the Society of Professional Journalists.

== Decision ==
On April 20, 2010, the Supreme Court affirmed the appellate court ruling in an 8–1 decision written by Chief Justice Roberts, with Justice Alito dissenting. The Court found that 18. U.S.C. §48 was substantially overbroad and so was invalid under the First Amendment to the United States Constitution.

=== Alito's dissent ===
Alito dissented, arguing that "(t)he most relevant of our prior decisions is Ferber, 458 U. S. 747 (1982), which concerned child pornography. The Court there held that child pornography is not protected speech, and I believe that Ferber's reasoning dictates a similar conclusion here."

== Aftermath ==
On April 21, one day after the Supreme Court struck down the law, its original sponsor, Representative Elton Gallegly (R-CA) introduced a new bill with much more specific language, indicating it was intended only to apply to "crush videos." President Barack Obama signed the bill into law on December 9, 2010.

== See also ==
- Snyder v. Phelps (2011)
- Bartnicki v. Vopper (2000)
- Church of Lukumi Babalu Aye v. City of Hialeah (1993)
- New York v. Ferber (1982)
- North Carolina Highway Patrol K-9 incident
