= Vorarephilia =

Erotic desire to eat or be eaten by someone

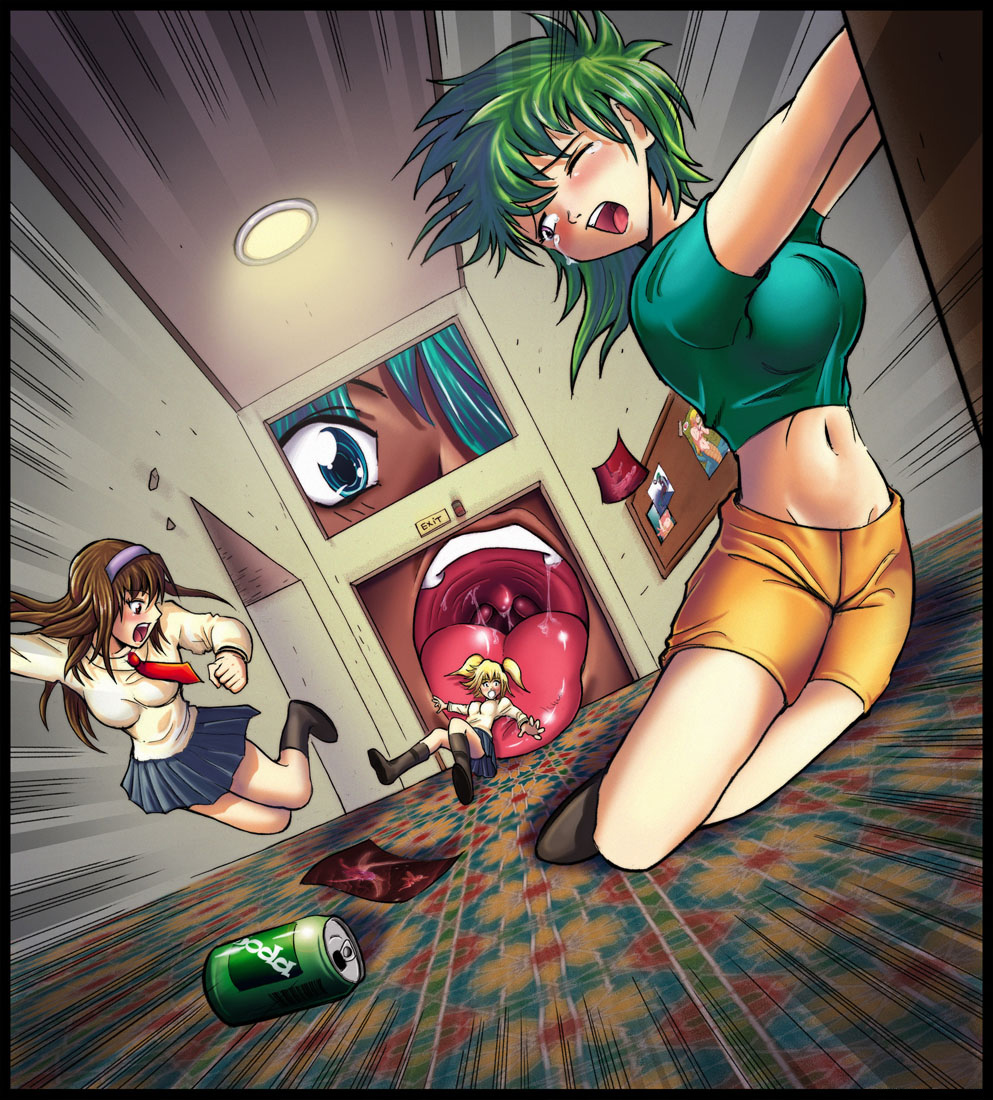
An example of manga-style vorarephilic artwork

Vorarephilia (often shortened to vore) is a paraphilia characterized by the erotic desire to be consumed by, or to personally consume, another person or creature. Vorarephilia can involve "soft" vore fantasies in which the victim is swallowed alive and whole, or sexual fantasies of cannibalism, also referred to as "hard" vore. The word vorarephilia is derived from the Latin vorare (to "swallow" or "devour"), and Ancient Greek φιλία (philía, "love").

== Content ==
Usually, vorarephilic fantasies involve a consumer (usually referred to as predator or pred for short) ingesting one or multiple victims (sometimes called prey) in some way. Since vorarephilic fantasies cannot be acted out in reality without injuring or killing someone, or are simply physically or physiologically impossible, they are often expressed in stories or drawings as well as sexual roleplay.

Vore is most often enjoyed through pictures, stories, videos, and video games, and similar themes can appear in mainstream media. Expressions can involve humans, animals, dragons, giant snakes, and other creatures, real or fictional. In some cases, vorarephilia may be described as a variation of macrophilia and may combine with other paraphilias. Apart from macrophilia, vore fantasies often have themes of BDSM, microphilia, pregnancy fetishism, and sexual cannibalism.

Most vorarephiles are not overly interested in sadomasochism; instead, they may get their pleasure from the psychological aspects, such as the total annihilation of identity. This does not necessarily indicate suicidal tendencies but is more often linked to general fantasies of escapism and solitude.

== Variations ==
A same-size vore illustration featuring a character with a large, distended belly after swallowing another whole

A macro/micro vore comic depicting a woman swallowing a much smaller man

There are several variations to the fantasy, often changing the way in which the victim is ingested. Typically, when the victim is consumed orally, artwork may depict what is known as "soft vore", meaning that the victim is swallowed whole and enters the stomach of the consumer, then is either left unharmed or digested inside. If the victim is kept safe (also known as endo vore or endosoma), the victim can eventually be let out by regurgitation or defecation, whereas if digestion happens, the victim is usually killed and the ensuing process may or may not also be shown in more detail, but may "reform" magically, spiritually, or technologically in some cases. The more extreme and less common form of the fetish is "hard vore", in which the victim is chewed and torn apart by the consumer, which may or may not be followed by a more gruesome depiction of digestion.

As there is room for artistic interpretation and niches, variations where a victim is inserted through a different body orifice may also be seen.

The sizes of the consumer and victim can vary. Notable examples include "Macro/micro vore", which is art in which the victim is much smaller than the consumer. Same-size vore, on the other hand, depicts a scenario where the victim and consumer are roughly the same size.

== Research ==
One case study analysis connected the fantasy with sexual masochism, and suggested that it could be motivated by a desire to merge with a more powerful other or permanently escape loneliness. With "no known treatment" for vorarephiles who feel 'ill' with their sexuality, psychologists at Toronto's Centre for Addiction and Mental Health have recommended trying to "adjust to, rather than change or suppress" the sexual interest. Medication for libido reduction could be used if deemed necessary.

Surveys in 2021 and 2022 that received roughly 1,600 and 3,200 responses respectively from an online community of self-identified vorarephiles offered some insight on the demographics of the community. 80% of vorarephiles were reported as male, about half identified as heterosexual, and slightly less than half of those surveyed described themselves as part of the furry fandom or unsure about their belonging to the fandom.

== See also ==
- Autassassinophilia – Sexual arousal by the risk of being killed
- Feederism
- Furry pornography
- Human cannibalism
- Inflation fetish
- List of paraphilias
- Sexual cannibalism – Animals' behaviours involving eating their mates during or after copulation
- Sitophilia – Sexual arousal by situations involving food
