= July 8 =

July 8 this year in various calendars
- Wednesday, 8 July 2026
| Akan | Kwawukuo |
| Armenian | 23 Hrotich 1475 |
| Aztec | Tepeilhuitl 19, 11 Mazātl |
| Babylonian | 22 Simanu, 2337 SE |
| Balinese pawukon | Menga, Beteng, Sri, Umanis, Was, Buda of Medangsia, Ludra, Jangur, Suka |
| Bengali | 24 Asharh, BS 1433 |
| Chinese | Yin Water Goat・Wall Mansion; Fire Horse Year, Month 5, Day 24 (Xiaoshu, 15 days until Dashu) |
| Common Era | 8 July 2026 CE |
| Coptic | 1 Epip, AM 1742 |
| Egyptian | 23 Athyr, 2775 NE |
| Ethiopian | 1 Ḥamlē, 2018 Amätä Məhrät |
| French Republican | Décade II, Décadi de Messidor de l'Année 234 de la République |
| Gregorian | 8 July, AD 2026 |
| Hebrew | 23 Tamuz, AM 5786 |
| Hindu | Revatī・Atigaṇḍa; Solar: 24 Āṣāḍha, 1948 SE; Lunisolar: Aṣṭamī, Kṛishna pakṣa of Jyeṣṭha, 2083 VE; Rāudra・5127 KY・1,872,764 |
| Icelandic | Miðvikudagur, 17 Sólmánuður 2026 |
| Islamic | 22 Muharram, AH 1448 (using tabular method) |
| ISO week date | 2026-W28-3 |
| Japanese | 24 Satsuki, Reiwa 8 (Shōsho, 15 days until Taisho) |
| Julian | 25 June, AD 2026 (AM 7534) |
| Julian day | 2461230 |
| Korean | 24 Maldal, 4359 DE |
| Maya | 13.0.13.13.7; 0 Xul, 11 Manik |
| Roman | ante diem VII Kalendas Iulias, MMDCCLXXIX AUC |
| Solar Hijri | 17 Tir, SH 1405 |
| Tibetan | 23 snron, me pho rta 2153 or 1772 or 1000 |

| << | July | | | | | >> |
| Su | Mo | Tu | We | Th | Fr | Sa |
| | | | 1 | 2 | 3 | 4 |
| 5 | 6 | 7 | 8 | 9 | 10 | 11 |
| 12 | 13 | 14 | 15 | 16 | 17 | 18 |
| 19 | 20 | 21 | 22 | 23 | 24 | 25 |
| 26 | 27 | 28 | 29 | 30 | 31 |
2026

July 8 in recent years
2026 (Wednesday)
2025 (Tuesday)
2024 (Monday)
2023 (Saturday)
2022 (Friday)
2021 (Thursday)
2020 (Wednesday)
2019 (Monday)
2018 (Sunday)
2017 (Saturday)

July 8 is the 189th day of the year (190th in leap years) in the Gregorian calendar; 176 days remain until the end of the year.

== Events ==
=== Pre-1600 ===
- 1167 – The Byzantines defeat the Hungarian army decisively at Sirmium, forcing the Hungarians to sue for peace.
- 1283 – Roger of Lauria, commanding the Aragonese fleet, defeats an Angevin fleet sent to put down a rebellion on Malta.
- 1497 – Vasco da Gama sets sail on the first direct European voyage to India.
- 1579 – Our Lady of Kazan, a holy icon of the Russian Orthodox Church, is discovered underground in the city of Kazan, Tatarstan.

=== 1601–1900 ===
- 1651 – The Venetian fleet under Alvise Mocenigo engages with an Ottoman fleet under Hosambegzade Ali Pasha south of Naxos, defeating it after three days.
- 1658 – Abaza Hasan Pasha and his allies declare a revolt against grand vizier Köprülü Mehmed Pasha, demanding his execution and marching on Istanbul.
- 1663 – Charles II of England grants John Clarke a Royal charter to Rhode Island.
- 1709 – Peter I of Russia defeats Charles XII of Sweden at the Battle of Poltava, thus effectively ending Sweden's status as a major power in Europe.
- 1716 – The Battle of Dynekilen forces Sweden to abandon its invasion of Norway.
- 1730 – An estimated magnitude 8.7 earthquake causes a tsunami that damages more than 1,000 km (620 mi) of Chile's coastline.
- 1741 – Reverend Jonathan Edwards preaches to his congregation in Enfield, Connecticut his most famous sermon, "Sinners in the Hands of an Angry God"; an influence for the First Great Awakening.
- 1758 – French forces hold Fort Carillon against the British at Ticonderoga, New York.
- 1760 – British forces defeat French forces in the last naval battle in New France.
- 1775 – The Olive Branch Petition is signed by the Continental Congress of the Thirteen Colonies of North America.
- 1776 – John Nixon delivers the first public reading of the Declaration of Independence of the United States.
- 1822 – Chippewas turn over a huge tract of land in Ontario to the United Kingdom.
- 1832 – An Egyptian army under Ibrahim Pascha defeats an Ottoman army under Mehmed Pascha in the battle of Hims.
- 1853 – The Perry Expedition arrives in Edo Bay with a treaty requesting trade.
- 1859 – King Charles XV & IV accedes to the throne of Sweden–Norway.
- 1864 – Ikedaya Incident: The Choshu Han shishis planned Shinsengumi sabotage on Kyoto, Japan at Ikedaya.
- 1874 – The Mounties begin their March West.
- 1876 – The Hamburg massacre prior to the 1876 United States presidential election results in the deaths of six African-Americans of the Republican Party, along with one white assailant.
- 1879 – Sailing ship USS Jeannette departs San Francisco carrying an ill-fated expedition to the North Pole.
- 1889 – The first issue of The Wall Street Journal is published.
- 1892 – St. John's, Newfoundland is devastated in the Great Fire of 1892.

=== 1901–present ===
- 1912 – Henrique Mitchell de Paiva Couceiro leads an unsuccessful royalist attack against the First Portuguese Republic in Chaves.
- 1932 – The Dow Jones Industrial Average reaches its lowest level of the Great Depression, closing at 41.22.
- 1937 – Turkey, Iran, Iraq, and Afghanistan sign the Treaty of Saadabad.
- 1947 – Reports are broadcast that a UFO crash-landed in Roswell, New Mexico in what became known as the Roswell UFO incident.
- 1948 – The United States Air Force accepts its first female recruits into a program called the Women's Air Force (WAF).
- 1960 – Francis Gary Powers is charged with espionage resulting from his flight over the Soviet Union.
- 1962 – Ne Win besieges and blows up the Rangoon University Student Union building to crush the Student Movement.
- 1965 – Canadian Pacific Air Lines Flight 21 is destroyed by a bomb near 100 Mile House, Canada, killing 52.
- 1966 – King Mwambutsa IV Bangiriceng of Burundi is deposed by his son Prince Charles Ndizi.
- 1970 – Richard Nixon delivers a special congressional message enunciating Native American self-determination as official US Indian policy, leading to the Indian Self-Determination and Education Assistance Act of 1975.
- 1972 – Israeli Mossad assassinate Palestinian writer Ghassan Kanafani.
- 1980 – The inaugural 1980 State of Origin game is won by Queensland who defeat New South Wales 20–10 at Lang Park.
- 1980 – Aeroflot Flight 4225 crashes near Almaty International Airport in the Kazakh Soviet Socialist Republic (present day Kazakhstan), killing all 166 people on board.
- 1982 – A failed assassination attempt against Iraqi president Saddam Hussein results in the Dujail Massacre over the next several months.
- 1988 – The Island Express train travelling from Bangalore to Kanyakumari derails on the Peruman bridge and falls into Ashtamudi Lake, Kerala in India killing 105 passengers and injuring over 200 more.
- 1990 – West Germany win the FIFA World Cup final against defending champions Argentina, with Andreas Brehme scoring the game's only goal.
- 1994 – Kim Jong Il begins to assume supreme leadership of North Korea upon the death of his father, Kim Il Sung.
- 1994 – Space Shuttle Columbia is launched on an international science mission.
- 2003 – Sudan Airways Flight 139 crashes near Port Sudan Airport during an emergency landing attempt, killing 116 of the 117 people on board.
- 2011 – Space Shuttle Atlantis is launched in the final mission of the U.S. Space Shuttle program.
- 2014 – Israel launches an offensive on Gaza amid rising tensions following the kidnapping and murder of three Israeli teenagers.
- 2022 – Former Japanese prime minister Shinzo Abe is shot and killed with an improvised firearm due to resentment against the Unification Church.
- 2025 – Hurricane Beryl makes landfall in Texas as a Category 1 hurricane, causing 44 deaths, over 2.7 residents without power, and $28 billion to $32 billion dollars worth of damage.

== Births ==
=== Pre-1600 ===
- 1478 – Gian Giorgio Trissino, Italian linguist, poet, and playwright (died 1550)
- 1528 – Emmanuel Philibert, Duke of Savoy (died 1580)
- 1538 – Alberto Bolognetti, Roman Catholic cardinal (died 1585)
- 1545 – Carlos, Prince of Asturias (died 1568)
- 1593 – Artemisia Gentileschi, Italian painter (died 1653)

=== 1601–1900 ===
- 1621 – Jean de La Fontaine, French author and poet (died 1695)
- 1766 – Dominique Jean Larrey, French surgeon (died 1842)
- 1779 – Giorgio Pullicino, Maltese painter and architect (died 1851)
- 1819 – Francis Leopold McClintock, Irish admiral and explorer (died 1907)
- 1830 – Frederick W. Seward, American lawyer and politician, 6th United States Assistant Secretary of State (died 1915)
- 1831 – John Pemberton, American chemist and pharmacist, invented Coca-Cola (died 1888)
- 1836 – Joseph Chamberlain, English businessman and politician, Secretary of State for the Colonies (died 1914)
- 1838 – Eli Lilly, American soldier, chemist, and businessman, founded Eli Lilly and Company (died 1898)
- 1838 – Ferdinand von Zeppelin, German general and businessman, founded the Zeppelin Airship Company (died 1917)
- 1839 – John D. Rockefeller, American businessman and philanthropist, founded the Standard Oil Company (died 1937)
- 1851 – Arthur Evans, English archaeologist and academic (died 1941)
- 1851 – John Murray, Australian politician, 23rd Premier of Victoria (died 1916)
- 1857 – Alfred Binet, French psychologist and graphologist (died 1911)
- 1867 – Käthe Kollwitz, German painter and sculptor (died 1945)
- 1876 – Alexandros Papanastasiou, Greek sociologist and politician, Prime Minister of Greece (died 1936)
- 1882 – Percy Grainger, Australian-American pianist and composer (died 1961)
- 1885 – Ernst Bloch, German philosopher, author, and academic (died 1977)
- 1885 – Hugo Boss, German fashion designer, founded Hugo Boss (died 1948)
- 1892 – Richard Aldington, English author and poet (died 1962)
- 1892 – Pavel Korin, Russian painter (died 1967)
- 1894 – Pyotr Kapitsa, Russian physicist and academic, Nobel Prize laureate (died 1984)
- 1895 – Igor Tamm, Russian physicist and academic, Nobel Prize laureate (died 1971)
- 1900 – George Antheil, American pianist, composer, and author (died 1959)

=== 1901–present ===
- 1904 – Henri Cartan, French mathematician and academic (died 2008)
- 1905 – Leonid Amalrik, Russian animator and director (died 1997)
- 1906 – Philip Johnson, American architect, designed the IDS Center and PPG Place (died 2005)
- 1907 – George W. Romney, American businessman and politician, 43rd Governor of Michigan (died 1995)
- 1908 – Louis Jordan, American singer-songwriter, saxophonist, and actor (died 1975)
- 1908 – Nelson Rockefeller, American businessman and politician, 41st Vice President of the United States (died 1979)
- 1908 – V. K. R. Varadaraja Rao, Indian economist, politician, professor and educator (died 1991)
- 1910 – Carlos Betances Ramírez, Puerto Rican general (died 2001)
- 1913 – Alejandra Soler, Spanish politician (died 2017)
- 1914 – Jyoti Basu, Indian politician, 6th Chief Minister of West Bengal (died 2010)
- 1914 – Billy Eckstine, American singer and trumpet player (died 1993)
- 1915 – Neil D. Van Sickle, American Air Force major general (died 2019)
- 1915 – Lowell English, United States Marine Corps general (died 2005)
- 1916 – Jean Rouverol, American author, actress and screenwriter (died 2017)
- 1917 – Pamela Brown, English actress (died 1975)
- 1917 – Faye Emerson, American actress (died 1983)
- 1918 – Paul B. Fay, American businessman, soldier, and diplomat, 12th United States Secretary of the Navy (died 2009)
- 1918 – Oluf Reed-Olsen, Norwegian resistance member and pilot (died 2002)
- 1918 – Craig Stevens, American actor (died 2000)
- 1919 – Walter Scheel, German soldier and politician, 4th President of West Germany (died 2016)
- 1920 – Godtfred Kirk Christiansen, Danish businessman (died 1995)
- 1921 – John Money, New Zealand psychologist and sexologist, known for his research on gender identity, and responsible for controversial involuntary sex reassignment of David Reimer (died 2006)
- 1923 – Harrison Dillard, American sprinter and hurdler (died 2019)
- 1923 – Val Bettin, American actor (died 2021)
- 1924 – Johnnie Johnson, American pianist and songwriter (died 2005)
- 1925 – Marco Cé, Italian cardinal (died 2014)
- 1925 – Arthur Imperatore Sr., Italian-American businessman (died 2020)
- 1925 – Dominique Nohain, French actor, screenwriter and director (died 2017)
- 1926 – David Malet Armstrong, Australian philosopher and author (died 2014)
- 1926 – John Dingell, American lieutenant and politician (died 2019)
- 1926 – Martin Riesen, Swiss professional ice hockey goaltender (died 2003)
- 1926 – Elisabeth Kübler-Ross, Swiss-American psychiatrist and author (died 2004)
- 1928 – Balakh Sher Mazari, former prime minister of Pakistan (died 2022)
- 1929 – Shirley Ann Grau, American author, wrote Pulitzer Prize winning novel Keepers of the House (died 2020)
- 1930 – Jerry Vale, American singer (died 2014)
- 1931 – Roone Arledge, American sports and news broadcasting executive (died 2002)
- 1933 – Antonio Lamer, Canadian lawyer and politician, 16th Chief Justice of Canada (died 2007)
- 1934 – Raquel Correa, Chilean journalist (died 2012)
- 1934 – Edward D. DiPrete, American politician, 70th Governor of Rhode Island (died 2025)
- 1934 – Marty Feldman, English actor and screenwriter (died 1982)
- 1935 – John David Crow, American football player and coach (died 2015)
- 1935 – Steve Lawrence, American actor and singer (died 2024)
- 1935 – Vitaly Sevastyanov, Russian engineer and cosmonaut (died 2010)
- 1939 – Ed Lumley, Canadian businessman and politician, 8th Canadian Minister of Communications (died 2025)
- 1941 – Dario Gradi, Italian-English footballer, coach, and manager
- 1942 – Phil Gramm, American economist and politician
- 1944 – Margaret W. Rossiter, American historian and author (died 2025)
- 1944 – Jeffrey Tambor, American actor and singer
- 1945 – Micheline Calmy-Rey, Swiss politician, 91st President of the Swiss Confederation
- 1947 – Kim Darby, American actress
- 1947 – Luis Fernando Figari, Peruvian religious leader, founded the Sodalitium Christianae Vitae
- 1948 – Raffi, Egyptian-Canadian singer-songwriter
- 1948 – Ruby Sales, American civil-rights activist
- 1949 – Wolfgang Puck, Austrian-American chef, restaurateur and entrepreneur
- 1949 – Y. S. Rajasekhara Reddy, Indian politician, 14th Chief Minister of Andhra Pradesh (died 2009)
- 1951 – Anjelica Huston, American actress and director
- 1952 – Larry Garner, American singer-songwriter and guitarist
- 1952 – Jack Lambert, American football player and sportscaster
- 1952 – Anna Quindlen, American columnist (1992 Pulitzer Prize)
- 1952 – Marianne Williamson, American author and activist
- 1957 – Carlos Cavazo, Mexican-American guitarist and songwriter
- 1957 – Aleksandr Gurnov, Russian journalist and author
- 1958 – Kevin Bacon, American actor and musician
- 1958 – Andreas Carlgren, Swedish educator and politician, 8th Swedish Minister for the Environment
- 1958 – Tzipi Livni, Israeli lawyer and politician, 18th Justice Minister of Israel
- 1959 – Pauline Quirke, English actress
- 1960 – Mal Meninga, Australian rugby league player and coach
- 1960 – Yann LeCun, French-American computer scientist
- 1961 – Andrew Fletcher, English keyboard player (died 2022)
- 1961 – Toby Keith, American singer-songwriter, producer, and actor (died 2024)
- 1962 – Joan Osborne, American singer-songwriter and guitarist
- 1963 – Mark Christopher, American director and screenwriter
- 1964 – Alexei Gusarov, Russian ice hockey player and manager
- 1966 – Ralf Altmeyer, German-Chinese virologist and academic
- 1966 – Shadlog Bernicke, Nauruan politician
- 1967 – Jordan Chan, Hong Kong actor and singer
- 1967 – Charlie Cardona, Colombian singer
- 1968 – Billy Crudup, American actor
- 1968 – Shane Howarth, New Zealand rugby player and coach
- 1969 – Sugizo, Japanese singer-songwriter, guitarist and producer
- 1970 – Beck, American singer-songwriter and producer
- 1970 – Mark Butler, Australian politician
- 1970 – Sylvain Gaudreault, Canadian educator and politician
- 1970 – Todd Martin, American tennis player and coach
- 1971 – Neil Jenkins, Welsh rugby player and coach
- 1972 – Karl Dykhuis, Canadian ice hockey player
- 1972 – Sourav Ganguly, Indian cricketer
- 1972 – Shōsuke Tanihara, Japanese actor
- 1973 – Kathleen Robertson, Canadian actress and writer
- 1974 – Hu Liang, Chinese field hockey player
- 1976 – Talal El Karkouri, Moroccan footballer
- 1976 – Ellen MacArthur, English sailor
- 1977 – Christian Abbiati, Italian footballer
- 1977 – Paolo Tiralongo, Italian cyclist
- 1977 – Milo Ventimiglia, American actor, director, and producer
- 1977 – Wang Zhizhi, Chinese basketball player
- 1978 – Urmas Rooba, Estonian footballer
- 1980 – Eric Chouinard, American-Canadian ice hockey player
- 1980 – Robbie Keane, Irish footballer
- 1981 – Anastasia Myskina, Russian tennis player
- 1982 – Shonette Azore-Bruce, Barbadian netball player
- 1982 – Sophia Bush, American actress and director
- 1982 – Alicia Vela-Bailey, American stunt performer, stunt double, actress, dancer, and choreographer
- 1982 – Hakim Warrick, American basketball player
- 1983 – Rich Peverley, Canadian ice hockey player
- 1986 – Renata Costa, Brazilian footballer
- 1987 – Josh Harrison, American baseball player
- 1988 – Miki Roqué, Spanish footballer (died 2012)
- 1988 – Jesse Sergent, New Zealand cyclist
- 1989 – Yarden Gerbi, Israeli Judo champion
- 1989 – Tor Marius Gromstad, Norwegian footballer (died 2012)
- 1990 – Kevin Trapp, German footballer
- 1991 – Virgil van Dijk, Dutch footballer
- 1992 – Ariel Camacho, Mexican singer-songwriter (died 2015)
- 1992 – Son Heung-min, Korean footballer
- 1993 – David Corenswet, American actor
- 1996 – Marlon Humphrey, American football player
- 1998 – Maya Hawke, American actress
- 1998 – Jaden Smith, American actor and rapper
- 1999 – İpek Öz, Turkish tennis player

== Deaths ==
=== Pre-1600 ===
- 689 – Kilian, Irish bishop
- 810 – Pepin of Italy, son of Charlemagne (born 773)
- 873 – Gunther, archbishop of Cologne
- 900 – Qatr al-Nada, wife of the Abbasid caliph al-Mu'tadid
- 901 – Grimbald, French-English monk and saint (born 827)
- 975 – Edgar the Peaceful, English king (born 943)
- 1153 – Pope Eugene III (born 1087)
- 1253 – Theobald I of Navarre (born 1201)
- 1261 – Adolf IV of Holstein, Count of Schauenburg
- 1390 – Albert of Saxony, Bishop of Halberstadt and German philosopher (born circa 1320)
- 1538 – Diego de Almagro, Spanish general and explorer (born 1475)

=== 1601–1900 ===
- 1623 – Pope Gregory XV (born 1554)
- 1689 – Edward Wooster, English-American settler (born 1622)
- 1695 – Christiaan Huygens, Dutch mathematician, astronomer, and physicist (born 1629)
- 1716 – Robert South, English preacher and theologian (born 1634)
- 1721 – Elihu Yale, American-English merchant and philanthropist (born 1649)
- 1784 – Torbern Bergman, Swedish chemist and mineralogist (born 1735)
- 1794 – Richard Mique, French architect (born 1728)
- 1823 – Henry Raeburn, Scottish portrait painter (born 1756)
- 1822 – Percy Bysshe Shelley, English poet and playwright (born 1792)
- 1850 – Prince Adolphus, Duke of Cambridge (born 1774)
- 1859 – Oscar I of Sweden (born 1799)
- 1873 – Franz Xaver Winterhalter, German painter and lithographer (born 1805)
- 1887 – Ben Holladay, American businessman (born 1819)
- 1895 – Johann Josef Loschmidt, Austrian chemist and physicist (born 1821)

=== 1901–present ===
- 1905 – Walter Kittredge, American violinist and composer (born 1834)
- 1913 – Louis Hémon, French-Canadian author (born 1880)
- 1917 – Tom Thomson, Canadian painter (born 1877)
- 1921 – Ellen Oliver (suffragette), British suffragette and purity activist (born 1870)
- 1930 – Joseph Ward, Australian-New Zealand businessman and politician, 17th Prime Minister of New Zealand (born 1856)
- 1933 – Anthony Hope, English author and playwright (born 1863)
- 1934 – Benjamin Baillaud, French astronomer and academic (born 1848)
- 1939 – Havelock Ellis, English psychologist and author (born 1859)
- 1941 – Moses Schorr, Polish rabbi, historian, and politician (born 1874)
- 1942 – Louis Franchet d'Espèrey, Algerian-French general (born 1856)
- 1942 – Refik Saydam, Turkish physician and politician, 5th Prime Minister of Turkey (born 1881)
- 1943 – Jean Moulin, French soldier and leader of the French Resistance (born 1899)
- 1950 – Othmar Spann, Austrian sociologist, economist, and philosopher (born 1878)
- 1952 – August Alle, Estonian lawyer, author, and poet (born 1890)
- 1956 – Giovanni Papini, Italian journalist, author, and critic (born 1881)
- 1965 – Thomas Sigismund Stribling, American lawyer and author (born 1881)
- 1967 – Vivien Leigh, British actress (born 1913)
- 1968 – Désiré Mérchez, French swimmer and water polo player (born 1882)
- 1971 – Kurt Reidemeister, German mathematician connected to the Vienna Circle (born 1893)
- 1972 – Ghassan Kanafani, Palestinian writer and politician (born 1936)
- 1973 – Gene L. Coon, American screenwriter and producer (born 1924)
- 1973 – Ben-Zion Dinur, Russian-Israeli educator and politician, 4th Education Minister of Israel (born 1884)
- 1973 – Wilfred Rhodes, English cricketer and coach (born 1877)
- 1979 – Sin-Itiro Tomonaga, Japanese physicist and academic, Nobel Prize laureate (born 1906)
- 1979 – Michael Wilding, English actor (born 1912)
- 1979 – Robert Burns Woodward, American chemist and academic, Nobel Prize laureate (born 1917)
- 1981 – Joe McDonnell, Irish Republican Army member, died on hunger strike (born 1951)
- 1985 – Phil Foster, American actor and screenwriter (born 1913)
- 1985 – Jean-Paul Le Chanois, French actor, director, and screenwriter (born 1909)
- 1986 – Skeeter Webb, American baseball player and manager (born 1909)
- 1987 – Lionel Chevrier, Canadian lawyer and politician, 27th Canadian Minister of Justice (born 1903)
- 1987 – Gerardo Diego, Spanish poet and author (born 1896)
- 1988 – Ray Barbuti, American runner and football player (born 1905)
- 1990 – Howard Duff, American actor (born 1913)
- 1991 – James Franciscus, American actor (born 1934)
- 1993 – Abul Hasan Jashori, Bangladeshi Islamic scholar and freedom fighter (born 1918)
- 1994 – Christian-Jaque, French director and screenwriter (born 1904)
- 1994 – Kim Il Sung, North Korean commander and politician, President of North Korea (born 1912)
- 1994 – Lars-Eric Lindblad, Swedish-American businessman and explorer (born 1927)
- 1994 – Dick Sargent, American actor (born 1930)
- 1996 – Irene Prador, Austrian-born actress and writer (born 1911)
- 1998 – Lilí Álvarez, Spanish tennis player, author, and feminist (born 1905)
- 1999 – Pete Conrad, American captain, pilot, and astronaut. Third man to walk on the moon. (born 1930)
- 2001 – John O'Shea, New Zealand independent filmmaker (born 1920)
- 2002 – Ward Kimball, American animator and trombonist (born 1914)
- 2004 – Paula Danziger, American author and educator (born 1944)
- 2005 – Maurice Baquet, French actor and cellist (born 1911)
- 2006 – June Allyson, American actress and singer (born 1917)
- 2007 – Chandra Shekhar, Indian lawyer and politician, 9th Prime Minister of India (born 1927)
- 2008 – John Templeton, American-born British businessman and philanthropist (born 1912)
- 2011 – Roberts Blossom, American actor and poet (born 1924)
- 2011 – Betty Ford, 38th First Lady of the United States (born 1918)
- 2012 – Muhammed bin Saud Al Saud, Saudi Arabian politician (born 1934)
- 2012 – Ernest Borgnine, American actor (born 1917)
- 2012 – Gyang Dalyop Datong, Nigerian physician and politician (born 1959)
- 2013 – Edmund Morgan, American historian and author (born 1916)
- 2013 – Claudiney Ramos, Brazilian footballer (born 1980)
- 2013 – Sundri Uttamchandani, Indian author (born 1924)
- 2014 – Plínio de Arruda Sampaio, Brazilian lawyer and politician (born 1930)
- 2014 – John V. Evans, American soldier and politician, 27th Governor of Idaho (born 1925)
- 2014 – Ben Pangelinan, Guamanian businessman and politician (born 1956)
- 2014 – Howard Siler, American bobsledder and coach (born 1945)
- 2016 – Abdul Sattar Edhi, Pakistani philanthropist (born 1928)
- 2018 – Tab Hunter, American actor, pop singer, film producer and author (born 1931)
- 2020 – Naya Rivera, American actress, model and singer (born 1987)
- 2020 – Alex Pullin, Australian snowboarder (born 1987)
- 2022 – Shinzo Abe, Japanese politician (born 1954)
- 2022 – Larry Storch, American actor and comedian (born 1923)
- 2022 – Luis Echeverría, Mexican lawyer and politician (born 1922)
- 2022 – Tony Sirico, American actor (born 1942)
- 2025 – Edward D. DiPrete, American politician, 70th Governor of Rhode Island
- 2025 – Paulette Jiles, American writer (born 1943)
- 2026 – Bonnie Tyler, Welsh singer (born 1951)

== Holidays and observances ==
- Christian Feast Day:
  - Abda and Sabas
  - Auspicius of Trier
  - Grimbald
  - Landrada
  - Kilian and Totnan
  - Saints Peter and Fevronia Day (Russian Orthodox)
  - Priscilla and Aquila
  - Procopius of Scythopolis
  - Sunniva and companions
  - July 8 (Eastern Orthodox liturgics)
- Air Force and Air Defense Forces Day (Ukraine)
