= Academy maniacs =

Russian serial killer duo

Artyom Anoufriev and Nikita Lytkin
- Born: October 4,1992 (Anoufriev); March 24, 1993 (Lytkin); Irkutsk, Irkutsk Oblast, Russia
- Died: November 30, 2021 (Nikita Lytkin)
- Other names: "Academy Maniacs" "Irkutsk Molotochniki"
- Motive: Inconclusive; notoriety and misanthropy appear to be primary factors
- Conviction: Murder
- Penalty: Life imprisonment (Anoufriev); 24 years' imprisonment, later changed to 20 years (Lytkin)

Details
- Span of crimes: 2010–2011
- Country: Russia
- State: Irkutsk (Note: Official name is the "Akademgorodok Microdistrict"; part of the Sverdlovsk Administrative District of Irkutsk)
- Killed: 6
- Injured: 9
- Weapons: Hammer; Knife; Air gun; Screwdriver
- Date apprehended: April 5, 2011

Artyom Alexandrovich Anoufriev (Russian: Артём Александрович Ануфриев; October 4, 1992) and Nikita Vakhtangovich Lytkin (Russian: Никита Вахтангович Лыткин; March 24, 1993 – November 30, 2021) were a serial killer duo from Irkutsk, Russia, known as the Academy maniacs and the Irkutsk Molotochniki (Hammer Men of Irkutsk). The pair collectively committed six murders and injured nine others in a series of attacks that took place in Irkutsk Academgorodok between 14 November 2010 and 3 April 2011, while still teenagers.

Both perpetrators were detained on April 5, 2011, and were collectively charged with murder, robbery, abuse of victims' bodies and organizing extremist activities. The judicial investigation of the case lasted from August 2012 to February 2013. On April 2, 2013, the Irkutsk Regional Court sentenced Anoufriev to life imprisonment, and Lytkin to 24 years imprisonment. On October 3, 2013, the Supreme Court of Russia finalized the verdict of Anoufriev's life sentence, while Lytkin's sentence was reduced to 20 years imprisonment. The drastic difference in their sentences is attributed to the fact that Russia established specific caps for prison time concerning juvenile offenders, and Lytkin was 17 at the time the majority of his crimes were committed. On November 30, 2021, Lytkin slashed his wrists at the Correctional Colony No. 7 in Angarsk and was found dead in the early morning of December 1, 2021.

The case is noteworthy for the fact that it was the first ever time that a case concerning violent extremism in Irkutsk Oblast was solved using forensic science.

== Early life of both ==
=== Artyom Anoufriev ===
Artyom Anoufriev was born on October 4, 1992, in Irkutsk, a city in Russia in central Siberia, and was raised without a father. Childhood friends described him in court positively, but nevertheless, his childhood was very difficult psychologically. His mother, Nina Ivanovna Anoufrieva, who worked as an accountant in an insurance company, did not have a good influence on the teenager's upbringing. According to the previous headmaster of the school he studied in, she had instructed young Anoufriev to hate people. When he received bad grades, his mother immediately wrote statements in which she reproached teachers for psychological pressure on her son, and if the marks were written only on his diary, she would write complaints about the concealment of information. Ultimately, while Anoufriev was in the 9th grade, the school management was forced to look for a new physics teacher, because the previous one refused to teach the classes that Anoufriev was in.

Anoufriev did well in his studies; he had good marks in literature and English, he participated in many activities and school competitions, had musical lessons for the guitar and double bass in 5 years, and also sang and played in a local music group that fell apart after his organizer left Irkutsk. However, since first grade Anoufriev was an outcast, and only in senior classes, when his classmates gradually matured and became more friendly, Anoufriev managed to get rid of this stigma, but at the same time, while in the 10th grade, his performance worsened and graduated from school with sufficiency. In the senior class, shortly before graduation, classmates shot a farewell amateur film, in which they told what happiness was in their opinion. Anoufriev was the only one who said: "To be honest, I do not know what happiness is. But I would really like to quickly find out what it is." After school, Anoufriev entered the Irkutsk State Medical University and at the same time went to work as an auxiliary worker in the art museum.

At the trial, Anoufriev's mother said that he had been beaten once by a group of Armenians, and a criminal case was opened, but nobody was charged. The Anoufriev family was transferred a sum amounting of 50 thousand rubles as compensation for non-pecuniary damage, but according to his mother, Anoufriev became very unbalanced after this incident. According to some reports, however, Anoufriev himself provoked the conflict by insulting the Armenians' family on an internet social networking site, after which his representatives called him to a "showdown", and the criminal case was stopped after the parties reconciled.

Nina Anoufrieva spoke against her son's friendship with Nikita Lytkin and believed that their communication should be prohibited, because, in her opinion, Lytkin was a bad influence on her son.

=== Nikita Lytkin ===
Nikita Lytkin was born on March 24, 1993. His great-grandparents were hydraulic builders, and participated in the construction of the Uglich and Irkutsk hydropower stations, while his mother Marina worked as an employee at a shoe store. Like Artyom Anoufriev, his father was absent. His father, Nikita Vakhtangovich Lytkin, was of Ossetian ethnicity and abandoned the family when Nikita was just a toddler. Vakhtang remarried and had another son, hence Nikita's younger half-brother. A few years later, Vakhtang's second wife passed away. His mother's death perturbed Nikita's adolescent, grief-stricken brother so much, he committed suicide via a firearm. Soon after, the father returned to the family, but his severe clinical depression, caused by the death of his second wife and the suicide of his second son, did not allow him to establish contact with Nikita. His father later returned to the family sporadically, leaving Lytkin even more disappointed each time he left. The last time he saw him was at 16, but the two found it difficult to communicate. The overlap of Nikita’s behavior, his brother’s suicide, and their father's severe clinical depression strongly point toward a complex mix of genetic vulnerability and environmental trauma. Nikita's father never made a public statement or legal declaration regarding his son's crimes.

Outwardly, Lytkin behaved quietly and calmly, but, according to his mother, he grew up very closed and uncommunicative. If guests came to visit, Lytkin preferred not to appear and each time went to his room. In childhood, he was often caught painting walls at the entrance of the house. In elementary school, Lytkin had a friend named Artur Lysenko, who helped him adapt among his peers. "He treated him like an object. But he helped him a lot - helped him to adapt. Nikita could not refuse, did not know how to say no. He had no option. I taught him to be able to say this very no. And when he learned that, he stopped being friends with Artur," Lytkin's mother commented on their relationship.

Prior to the 5th grade, Lytkin was a good student, had exemplary behavior, often participated in creative contests and received commendable letters, his hobby being video games. In 2004, Lytkin enrolled in the mathematics class, due to high test scores, however, his mother later stated the other children did not accept him. He met Anoufriev, who was a year older, at Lysenko's birthday party. By that time, Lytkin was in a state of deep depression, and only decided to entrust all of his problems to Anoufriev, since he received support from him in return. According to Lytkin's mother, since the other boys did not like Anoufriev, Lytkin gradually began to lose previous friends, because Anoufriev's unfriendly attitude began to spread to him, but the teenager did not worry about it, as he considered his relationships with previous friends as "fake children's friendships." Meanwhile, Artur Lysenko said in court that Lytkin lost friends due to his quick change in behavior, which was expressed once when Lytkin came to school, he did not greet anyone, and then completely closed himself. According to unverified claims from Lysenko, this was due to the fact that Lytkin was very jealous of classmates from richer families and more stable home lives. The lack of socialization of the teenager resulted in his classmates bullying him; Lysenko said at the trial that there would be no conflict if Lytkin had learned to fight back, but instead he would answer "die", because of which for 5 years Lytkin's school name was "Jimbo" (referring to the character Jimbo Jones from the American animated series The Simpsons, a grim and cruel teenager).

Together with Anoufriev, Lytkin formed a punk rock band called Злые Гномы (English: Evil Dwarfs). This group did not last long, but managed to release one full-length album in 2008 entitled Чёрные полосы крови (English: Black Streaks of Blood). Soon after, the duo created another new group; this time a noise band called Расчленённая ПугачОва (English: Dismembered PugachOva). The lyrics of both bands centered around violence and obscene language, Dismembered PugachOva in particular tried to be deliberately offensive with its song titles and lyrics which was a characteristic that was heavily inspired by the American grindcore band Anal Cunt—a band that the pair even covered a song from on one of the many digital releases that Lytkin subsequently uploaded to the Internet. Few acquaintances knew about their musical activities, since Lytkin did not show the slightest signs of aggression, sadism or interest in heavy music. According to Anoufriev, Lytkin could not stand up for himself and often gave up to the offenders. At the time of the killings, Anoufriev was Lytkin's only friend, and he was very dependent on their friendship. In turn, Lytkin was also Anoufriev's only friend at the time.

In the 8th grade he began to skip school and, unlike Anoufriev, was expelled after nine classes, entering college twice afterwards—first in energy, then in construction in 2009. In the first case, he was expelled for academic failure, after he failed to pass the first session; in the second, Lytkin had a conflict with his classmates when they began to bully him, one of his classmates patronized him, so in return he burglarized his house and stole money and belongings. Lytkin's mother filed a police report but later withdrew it, not wanting him to be imprisoned. After this, Lytkin stopped attending classes.

As a child, Lytkin and his mother attended church for two years and both were baptized, but over time Marina began paying more attention to work, going to church less and less. Then Lytkin himself began to reject the church. For some time he was engaged in music, painting and kickboxing, but then gave it all up, devoting all his free time to regular visits on social networks. He had a lag in psychological development since childhood. Psychologists had advised his mother to give him more freedom and not to restrict his personal space; however, as time passed, Lytkin's state of mind began to deteriorate, and several years before the killings he began to be ashamed of his mother, trying to avoid her at all costs.

On November 30, 2021, Lytkin slashed his wrists at the Correctional Colony No. 7 in Angarsk. He was found dead in the early morning of December 1, 2021, having served ten years of his sentence. Initially sentenced to 24 years in prison by judges, the Supreme Court of Russia lowered his sentence to 20 years in prison, which would have resulted in his release in 2031. He was 28 years old at the time of his death.

== Crimes ==
=== Background and motives ===
Anoufriev was for some time a member of a white power skinhead group (he also participated in the Annual Russian March in Irkutsk in 2010), and in certain circles he had the nickname "Fashik-Natsik", but did not participate in speeches and was not very active. Lytkin, at the suggestion of Anoufriev, also communicated with the skinheads, but was not accepted because of his "discrediting" Ossetian patronymic Vakhtangovich. After his arrest, Anoufriev said that it was the communication with the skinheads that led him to commit murder, although he had not participated in their society for long, finding their ideology too passive and soft. The then unofficial leader of the Irkutsk skinheads "Boomer", to whom Anoufriev spoke for a couple months in 2009, said in court that Anoufriev was not part of their society, because his views differed from their ideology. According to Boomer, Anoufriev simply felt hatred towards everyone, and did not care about whom he killed.

The prime investigator, Captain Yevgeny Karchevsky, who interrogated both criminals during the investigation, claimed from joining the skinhead group and ending with murders, the motive was the desire to become famous and attract attention. A peculiar role was also played by the fact that when they were members of the Neo-Nazi organization "White Power", one of its members advised the pair to read a certain kind of literature—a book whose name, in Russian, sounds like "Born to hate". The duo became interested in this, because they discovered that the psychological state of the person described there was very similar to their own, and it seemed that they would be able to solve all their problems this way. In fact, this is precisely what caused the misanthropy in them. Meanwhile, Alexander Kostrov, an associate professor at the department of Modern National History of the Irkutsk State University, supported the claim in court that their actions fit into the misanthropy category.

Another motive, confirmed by both Anoufriev and Lytkin, was the desire to imitate other well-known serial killers. A certain role was played when they watched a TV program in 2007 about the "Bitsa Park Maniac" Alexander Pichushkin, who committed several dozen murders in Moscow. The pair became interested in him, and Anoufriev created the "Pichushkin – Our President" group on the internet. On February 13, one day before the anniversary of the execution of Andrei Chikatilo, they posted his portrait on the internet with the signature "Andrei Romanovich. We grieve." They were interested in the so-called "Dnepropetrovsk maniacs" Viktor Sayenko and Igor Suprunyuk, as well as the Irkutsk "Blood Magic Gang", whose sentence was delivered on March 1, 2010. The duo openly expressed their sympathy for the gang leader Konstantin Shumkov and for the gang's activities in general, in particular, Lytkin even created a group in one social network called "Irkutsk anti-bom gang: Blood Magic". In addition, the teens dedicated one of their albums from "Dismembered PugachOva" to Shumkov's gang under the name "Blood Magic", and in the introduction they openly declared their intention of continuing Shumkov's work:

The "Dismembered PugachOva" group will continue the work of the "Blood Magic" not only in the musical sense, but also in the real sense. [...] There is no place for posers in our group. Only those who decide the fate of cattle or are only going to start serious actions are allowed. If you are determined, you are here.

Three months before the arrest, Anoufriev's neighbors began to hear strange sounds from his apartment. Anoufriev shouted "I hate everybody!" and "I will kill you!", and at the same time, strange sounds were heard, as if he was beating with his fists on the wall or rushing at it with his body. There is an assumption that he beat his mother, as the neighbors would occasionally hear somebody yelling to get off them. During the investigation, Anoufriev frankly admitted that his relationship with his mother was so strained that at times he was afraid he wouldn't be able to prevent himself from killing her. Lytkin also expressed a similar aggravation: he almost stopped communicating with his family, his depression intensified, and he began to suffer from insomnia.

During the investigation, Marina Lytkina blamed herself for her son's hatred, saying: "I have always told him that there are many good people in the world and that there are more good people than bad people to learn and forgive. I tried to protect him from trouble while I could, and thus broke his life. I have ceased to be an authority for him, because I myself am just a weak woman who has not achieved anything in life, who has only worked from morning till night in order to somehow survive."

=== Inclination to kill ===
According to Anoufriev, the idea of killing came from Lytkin, arguing that, unlike Lytkin, killing did not give him the satisfaction or relief he had hoped for; "I will just say—he is a leader. He did not influence, but was an instigator of crimes," said Anoufriev. In the course of the investigation, Anoufriev stated in the testimony that he planned to move to St. Petersburg in the future, where he wanted to commit more crimes, but later refuted his claims.

According to investigator Yevgeny Karchevsky, Lytkin himself admitted that he could not have committed the murders alone, since it "wasn't interesting to one." "Artyom and I did it—I liked it," he said. In a number of interviews, Lytkin also stated that he would have continued to kill if he hadn't been arrested.

At the court hearing on March 6, 2013, Lytkin declared that Anoufriev did not incline him to commit crimes, in response to which Anoufriev said: "I will go crazy with this person". After the announcement of the sentence, one of the surviving victims, Nina Kuzmina, said:

Nikita was just unlucky with a friend. He was an outcast from 5th grade, he was not accepted, and because of his character he could bear it. It was hard for him to live. And then came the only friend. Artyom joined skinheads. Then he got into the National Socialists. He needed to approve himself. Judging by the way Anoufriev behaved during the meetings, he is rather deceitful, very cunning, and arrogant. Nikita was just at hand. This does not justify Nikita in the least, but I told him so during the debate: "Nikita, you are not lucky."

Among the investigators there was an opinion that in the pair "Anoufriev-Lytkin", Anoufriev was a "think tank" and "ideological inspirer", and Lytkin was the "performer", since it was established that all knife wounds were made by Lytkin. But during the arrest, Anoufriev called Lytkin a leader and instigator in an interview with CM Number One. The "Boomer" mentioned above, at the trial, said that Anoufriev was "too flawed" to be a leader. In his words, once their group attacked a group of Caucasians, but Anoufriev didn't show his worth and fled. However, it was later established that most of the first strikes were delivered by Lytkin. After the verdict was passed, investigator Maxim Khomyak said: "These teenagers are locked on each other, because they fit together perfectly. Anoufriev is a leader who wanted to be understood at a glance. Lytkin is a performer who dreamed of approval and recognition."

=== Chronology of attacks ===
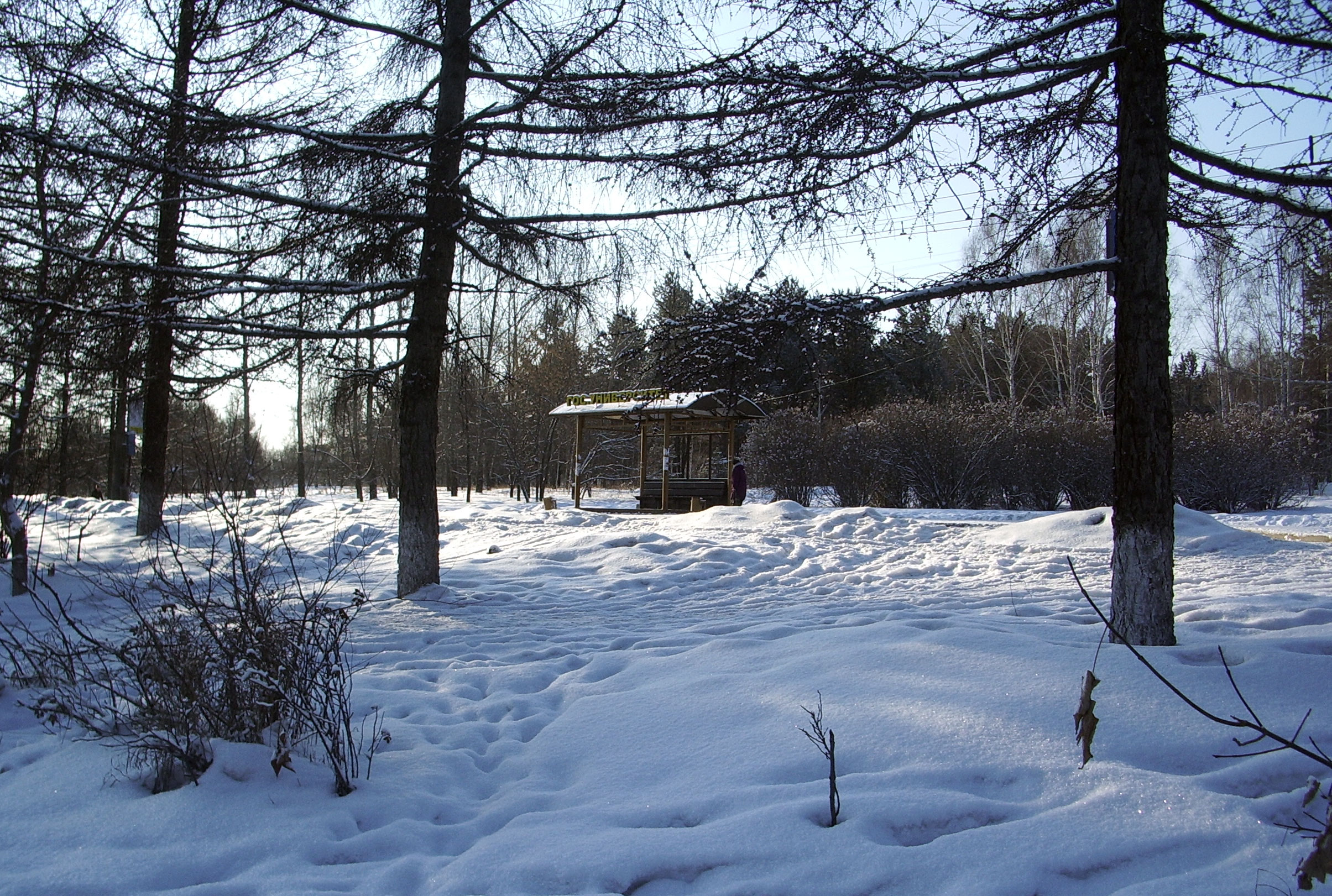
Public transport stop "State University" in Akademgorodok

While searching for victims, Anoufriev and Lytkin walked the same way—from the "State University" stop to the "Akademgorodok" every day, from 6 p.m. to 10 p.m. They often passed by as many as twenty people while looking for a victim that was suitable for them. For the first week of these walks, they did not attack anyone. As the investigator Yevgeny Karchevsky stated at the trial, "this was the urge [in which] they listened to their inner voice." For the killings, the Molotochniki chose to attack either in the late evening, night, or early morning, taking advantage of the fact that their mothers worked at night. Mallets, hammers, and baseball bats were used as murder weapons, as well as knives. During interrogation, Anoufriev admitted that he had dealt the first blows, while Lytkin was the first to mutilate the corpses. They finished off the victims together, inflicting anywhere from 15 to 20 blows. Since Anoufriev and Lytkin always attacked from behind, all the survivors of the "Molotochniki" could not tell the investigators any specific details that could immediately expose the criminals, because all of them at best saw them only briefly and did not even remember their voices. And although at court they recalled the same signs of the attackers and recognized that Anoufriev and Lytkin were very similar to them, they couldn't definitely recognize them.

- November 14, 2010: Lytkin and Anoufriev attacked 18-year-old Anastasia Markovskaya while she was walking from the "19th school" stop in the direction of the Novo-Irkutsky village, and smashed her head. The girl remained alive, as the killers were frightened off (according to other sources, she pretended to be dead). OM-2 officers from the Irkutsk Police Department did not initiate a criminal case, citing the fact that Markovskaya was not robbed, although she was prepared to describe her attackers. Meanwhile, Markovskaya herself reported the attack on the Akademgorodok Internet forum. The criminals, after reading the message, began to correspond with her, being especially interested in what she felt when she was beaten.
- November 24, 2010: Anoufriev and Lytkin attacked a 46-year-old woman, and then stole her bag. This time a criminal case was initiated, but only for robbery.
- December 1, 2010: Anoufriev and Lytkin attacked another woman, but, frightened by witnesses, they ran away, taking her bag. In the bag were 500 rubles, with which they later bought mallets. After some time, they saw 12-year-old Danil Semyonov, who studied in the same school as them. Semyonov was going for a ride on a hill with his snow scooter. Lytkin, noticing the boy, suggested to Anoufriev that they kill him, to which he agreed. According to Anoufriev, Lytkin noted that Semyonov was a weak victim, unable to provide strong resistance. After catching the child, Lytkin stunned him from behind with a blow to the head with the mallet, and when he fell, Anoufriev continued to beat him with a baseball bat. On Semyonov's hand a hematoma was found, indicating either that he had defended himself, or one the killers had sharply grabbed his arm. Lytkin then drove a penknife into Semyonov's temple by the handle. When the victim's mother and brother found the child, he was still alive. An ambulance team was called to the scene, but they got stuck in a traffic jam, and by the time of arrival the boy had already died. At that time, Semyonov's parents did not think that their son could have been a murder victim. Similarly, the experts considered the case an accident, concluding that the boy had hit a birch tree at very high speeds. However, the hill's slope on which he rode had an inclination of only 10 degrees, the boy's snow scooter was undamaged, and according to former investigator Maxim Khomyak, who was involved in the case, there was nothing at all in the snow that Semyonov could have smashed his head on. No criminal case was started, which is why for some time Semyonov was not associated with the murderers. Later, Lytkin and Anoufriev admitted that they simply "trained" on the boy. Semyonov was their first killed victim.
- December 16, 2010: Twenty meters from the place where Semyonov was killed, the body of 69-year-old Olga Mikhailovna Pirog, a leading researcher at the Research institute for Solar and Terrestrial Physics, was found. The woman, as it turned out, was killed in the same way as Semyonov, but this time she was murdered quickly, which was later done with the other victims. On her body, 30 knife wounds were counted, but money and jewelry were untouched. For some time, it was mistakenly believed that Pirog was the first victim killed by the pair, since Semyonov's death was recognized as an accident. In the course of this attack, the criminals made an audio recording, on which they first discussed how they would kill her, then recorded the murder.
- December 29, 2010: First, the pair attacked Inessa Valentinovna Svetlova, who managed to miraculously escape—they just took her bag, which they then threw away. Then, at 7 o'clock in the morning (an hour after the attack on Svetlova), the coach of the local sports school, 22-year-old Yekaterina Karpova, who was pregnant, was returning home to the private sector near Akademgorodok together with her 6-year-old niece Olya Averina. She encountered Anoufriev and Lytkin near the railway, but did not pay attention to them because she was talking on her mobile phone. The pair then attacked them when they crossed the railroad. Averina managed to escape; however, Lytkin had managed to hit her in the sides (the girl was later diagnosed with an extensive hematoma in the liver area). Yekaterina Karpova, despite the fact that she screamed that she was pregnant, had her fingers snapped and her head smashed in, but suddenly a car leaving from behind the nearest corner scared off the killers, which saved both Karpova's life and that of her unborn child. In the emergency room of the hospital where she was taken, Karpova saw Svetlova with similar injuries.
- January 1, 2011: Around 5 o'clock in the morning, Anoufriev and Lytkin attacked a homeless man who was alone near some garbage cans on Lermontov Street, inflicting about 40 blows to him and smashing his head with their mallets. He later died in hospital; authorities could not establish his identity, and in the case he was listed as "Corpse No. 20".
- January 30, 2011: Anoufriev and Lytkin attacked student Oleg Semyonov, who was returning home late at night from the "Stratosphere" night club. Semyonov managed to escape, and later doctors diagnosed him with bruised head wounds, a brain concussion and traumatic brain injuries.
- February 3, 2011: The pair attacked an elderly woman, who was later taken to the hospital with an open head injury.
- Night of February 8–9, 2011: The pair attacked another woman who survived, because the killers were frightened off by a passing car.
- February 21, 2011: Alexander Petrovich Maximov, who was drunk and returning home from visiting his sister, was killed by the pair. The man had his jaw and head completely broken. Lytkin had shot him in the head with a Baikal Air pistol, and Anoufriev tried to remove the injured eyeballs, but could not do it because he did not know how. Maximov was buried in a closed coffin and decapitated, with remnants of his skull later becoming tangible evidence.
- February 27, 2011: Lytkin single-handedly attacked Nina Kuzmina, who was sitting on a bench on Lermontov Street. He hit her twice on the head, but the woman made a fuss, which made Alexander Chervyakov, who lived next door, look out the window. Lytkin, frightened, ran away, taking the woman's mobile phone with him. (Note: Lytkin's attack on Nina Kuzmina in February 2011 was the only time that only one of them was active. Anoufriev did not take part in this, so his number of attempted murders is less than Lytkin's.)
- Night of March 10–11, 2011: On the footpath near the "State University" bus stop, not far from Anoufriev's house, the criminals attacked another homeless person, Roman Faizullin. Anoufriev shot the man twice in the face, after which, together with Lytkin, they dragged the body into some bushes and began stabbing him in the head, groin and chest with knives. Lytkin tried to cut off the hand, but due to the fact that the knife was small, he managed to cut off only the little finger. Later, Anoufriev photographed the corpse, behind which a bloody trail was shown, from the window of his apartment.
- Unknown date: Anoufriev and Lytkin attacked a homeless woman. She survived because the criminals were frightened off by a police officer who saw them from the window of his apartment.
- Unknown date: The pair attacked a woman under an arch; at the investigative experiment Anoufriev said that this time he had used a screwdriver instead of a knife. Since it was a crowded place, the pair, fearing to attract attention, did not kill her and ran away, taking her bag.
- April 3, 2011: The last victim of the criminals, 63-year-old homeless woman Alevtina Kuydina, was killed near a research institute. Anoufriev and Lytkin first killed her, then filmed themselves mutilating her corpse. On the video, shot by Anoufriev, Lytkin cut off the woman's earlobe with a knife, after which he wanted to cut off her wrists and eyeballs, but this did not work out for him; he then threw the knife straight into the woman's eye and began to stab her repeatedly in the face. Later, they threw the earlobe on a porch of the school in which they studied. Anoufriev later sent the video to his online "friend of interest" from St. Petersburg, Ilya Ustinov (known by the online alias "Solomon Godzho"), who distributed it all over the Internet; because of this, the Irkutsk police for some time checked for leaks of information, since an erroneous version of the video itself was distributed over to the police themselves.

=== Question about possible accomplices ===
In October 2012, a 27-year-old Vladimir Gusev from Krasnoyarsk Krai spoke at the trial, admitting that he was Anoufriev's "second friend", with whom he agreed on the basis of common extremist views. The young man confessed that at one time Anoufriev told him about three of the murders and had even taken him two times to "hunt", which, however, both times ended in nothing. For the first time, Vladimir agreed to go, because he did not believe that Anoufriev and Lytkin were behind the killings, and when he realized that they weren't lying, he did not report it to the police, because he was afraid that they would kill him and the girl who lived next door to Anoufriev. Vladimir also stated that a few days before the murder, Lytkin had received a subpoena in the army in connection to coming of age, to which Anoufriev casually told Vladimir that "Lytkin will have to be killed so that he will not be burned."

On March 6, 2013, Lytkin unexpectedly stated at the trial that Anoufriev did not take part in four of the crimes. In particular, he hadn't killed Olga Pirog, and instead there was another person there with Lytkin, with whom he committed two of the attacks, and in the fourth they were joined by another accomplice. The defendant called their names, but the press did not disclose them; however, they did confirm that the accomplice in the fourth crime had been a witness. The investigation was on the verge of renewal, when on March 13, Lytkin, again, unexpectedly, admitted that he had no accomplices. He declined to say why he had slandered the innocent, but the media suggested that he wanted to delay the investigation. His mother said that he had done it to shield Anoufriev; on dates in the detention center, Lytkin once told his mother "Why do they make the devil out of Artyom and I am so white and fluffy? We are both to blame. He is no worse and no better than me, we committed murders together." Anoufriev said that the investigator had pressured Lytkin, threatening him with a transfer to a solitary cell. Lytkin's mother denied a statement from Anoufriev, saying that at those early interrogations where she was present, the investigators had never pressed her son, and that she did not see the point that they would pressure him now.

=== Online activities ===
In addition to the attacks, Anoufriev and Lytkin were active in social networks. Without concealing themselves, they described their crimes and even framed their gravity. On his personal pages on VKontakte, Anoufriev wrote: "We are gods, deciding who will live and who will die." The young men also led "recruiting conversations" with a number of users who visited their pages and groups. In a correspondence with a certain Yura Anoufriev, he suggested that the interlocutor try and kill the janitor for "training" and "training the psyche"; during the trial, Artyom Anoufriev stated that his account was being corresponded by an acquaintance who had access to it. Later during the investigation, when all the users with whom Anoufriev and Lytkin communicated were interrogated, it turned out that most of them simply did not believe the criminals, believing that they were taking on other people's murders in order to attract attention. The entire correspondence of Anoufriev, seized during the investigation, was 8 volumes in the form of 4,600 pages of printed text, which remained classified until the end of the trial.

== Investigation ==
On March 11, 2011, after the body of a victim of the "Molotochniki" was found, a rally was held in Akademgorodok on what measures should be taken regarding the events taking place. By that time, there was already information that the killers were from age 16 to 18. Anoufriev and Lytkin also attended the meeting, offering ideas and videotaping it on a mobile phone. Meanwhile, constant patrols were conducted in the area. Special squads were created, and the crime rate decreased markedly, but did not lead to the killers' capture. In Akademgorodok there was a panic caused by misinformation about the killings, which is why most common version among citizens was that it was a single maniac and he was about 30 years old. Anoufriev and Lytkin never once came under suspicion, because, according to the words of investigator Maxim Khomyak, "everyone looked for strangers. And these guys were their own in Akademgorodok."

Olga Lipchinskaya, a journalist of Komsomolskaya Pravda, a month before the arrest of Anoufriev and Lytkin, when no one could establish their identities, gave this description of the "Academy Maniac":

Akademovsky residents think they are afraid of a killer maniac or teenagers hooked up on a bloody craft. There are no other versions about the one who kills. And a certain spiderman sitting at a computer at home is genuinely amused, knowing how much people are afraid of HIM. In fact, hundreds of people, precisely according to HIS reports of victims, gather in the squares, organize people's guards, and are afraid to take to the streets. OH, this person feels like a winner. We are in the age of the Internet, gentlemen.

=== False arrest ===
On January 15, 2011, the homeless 19-year-old Vladimir Bazilevsky, who had blood on his clothes, was detained on suspicion of murdering the unknown homeless man on January 1. Bazilevsky stated that he had spent the night of January 1 in a sewer well, but the operative who interrogated him began to convince him otherwise using beatings. According to Bazilevsky, the investigator literally knocked out a murder confession from him, forcing him to write it down. He gave the name of the victim as Andrei, nicknamed "Taiga"; this was actually the name of one of his friends. During the investigative experiment, Bazilevsky explained how the murder took place and where he had left the body, giving his testimony to the camera. Based on results of a forensic examination, which showed the blood of the murdered and the blood on Bazilevsky's clothes matched, Judge Andrei Obyskalov convicted Bazilevsky in April 2011, sentencing him to 4 years.

Subsequently, investigator Yevgeny Karchevsky, while checking the man's testimony, found with the help of an investigator from the Sverdlovsk Oblast that the blood on Bazilevsky's clothes did not in fact match the victim's. In addition to this, the investigators found that Andrei "Taiga" was actually alive. He asked the prosecutor's office to reconsider the case, but he was refused. However, the lawyers of the human rights organization Public Verdict soon found out about it, because of which Karchevsky's second petition was granted. In May 2012, Bazilevsky, after one-and-a-half years' imprisonment, was released from prison, and all charges against him were dropped. The operative who pressed him was never found. Another officer, Yuri Fedorov, was accused of falsifying evidence and removed from work at the end of July. On October 9, 2014, he was sentenced to three years with 2 years prohibition of holding posts in state and municipal services. Fedorov did not admit guilt and filed an appeal, after which in February 2015 his sentence was canceled and sent for review. For the illegal sentence, Bazilevsky's lawyer demanded compensation from the state amounting to 3 million rubles, but as a result, on November 19, 2013, the Sverdlovsk District Court of Irkutsk ordered the state to pay only 300,000 rubles.

=== Detention and arrest ===
A few days before his arrest, Lytkin's mother found a knife packaged in the hallway (according to other sources, she found the knife in a pocket of his jacket). When asked why he needed a knife, Lytkin answered that he had it for self-defense. A little later, he said to his grandmother: "I will soon be lost." Both were arrested on April 5, 2011, after the alleged facial composites were distributed at the Institute of Organic Chemistry, where Lytkin's grandmother worked at the time. His grandmother and Lytkin's uncle Vladislav studied the images, and suspecting something was wrong, Vladislav went to Lytkin's house. Nikita Lytkin was not at home then, but he had left behind his camera, in which he inadvertently left a flash card with a recording of Alevtina Kuydina's murder. Upon seeing the recording, Vladislav took the camera to the police, and after an hour and a half the two were detained by officers. Lytkin reacted calmly to the arrest, as the relatives persuaded him to surrender. By midnight, Lytkin and Anoufriev confessed to the authorities about five of the murders and six other attacks. When Anoufriev signed the protocol, he, imitating Pichushkin, told investigator Yevgeny Karchevsky that: "As one hero said, give me a glass of whiskey and a cigar—and you will learn so much new about this life that your hair will begin to move on your head." Later the number of crimes increased to six murders and ten attacks. Anoufriev and Lytkin also added that in the evening of that day they had planned another murder.

During the investigation, the apartment of a man named Friedrich Oberschulets was searched, based on the fact he was in close contact with Anoufriev on the Internet; nothing was found, but Lyudmila Begagoina from Irkutsk Reporter stated that the search was carried out too late and there was also time to hide the dirt. During a search in the apartments of the teenagers, a 60-mm mallet, four "pearly yellowish" teeth, a black hat with slots, an air gun which Anoufriev had hidden in an electric stove, folding knives, video tapes and flash cards were found. There were also notebooks with materials of an extremist nature, which the public prosecutor hardly read during the trial, because all of them contained profanities. Anoufriev's mother destroyed one of the notebooks while investigators searched the apartment, as it clearly incriminated Anoufriev; this fact was later indicated by the prosecutor during the announcement of the search protocol.

On April 7, 2011, the Sverdlovsk District Court of Irkutsk chose a measure of restraint in relation to Anoufriev and Lytkin in the form of detention for a period of two months. Subsequently, the terms of keeping the "Molotochniki" in custody were periodically extended: on June 6, 2011, they were extended until October 6, due to the need for a forensic psychiatric examination, but on October 5 it became known that the prison terms were extended by another two and a half months. On February 13, 2013, when they once again expired, Anoufriev's lawyers made a petition in which they asked the court to change the preventative measures on their own recognizance, and Anoufriev himself stated that he no longer represented a danger to society. Lytkin did not submit any petitions. The court disagreed with the arguments of the defense and extended the terms in custody for both until March 2013.

On June 9, 2011, the media published a video message made by Anoufriev, where he apologized to the victims' families and advised parents to monitor their children in order to avoid similar crimes in the future. A month earlier, an open letter was published by Irina Alekseyevna Antipova, Lytkin's grandmother, in which she accused the media and the Internet of promoting violence.

== Court ==
=== Judicial investigation ===
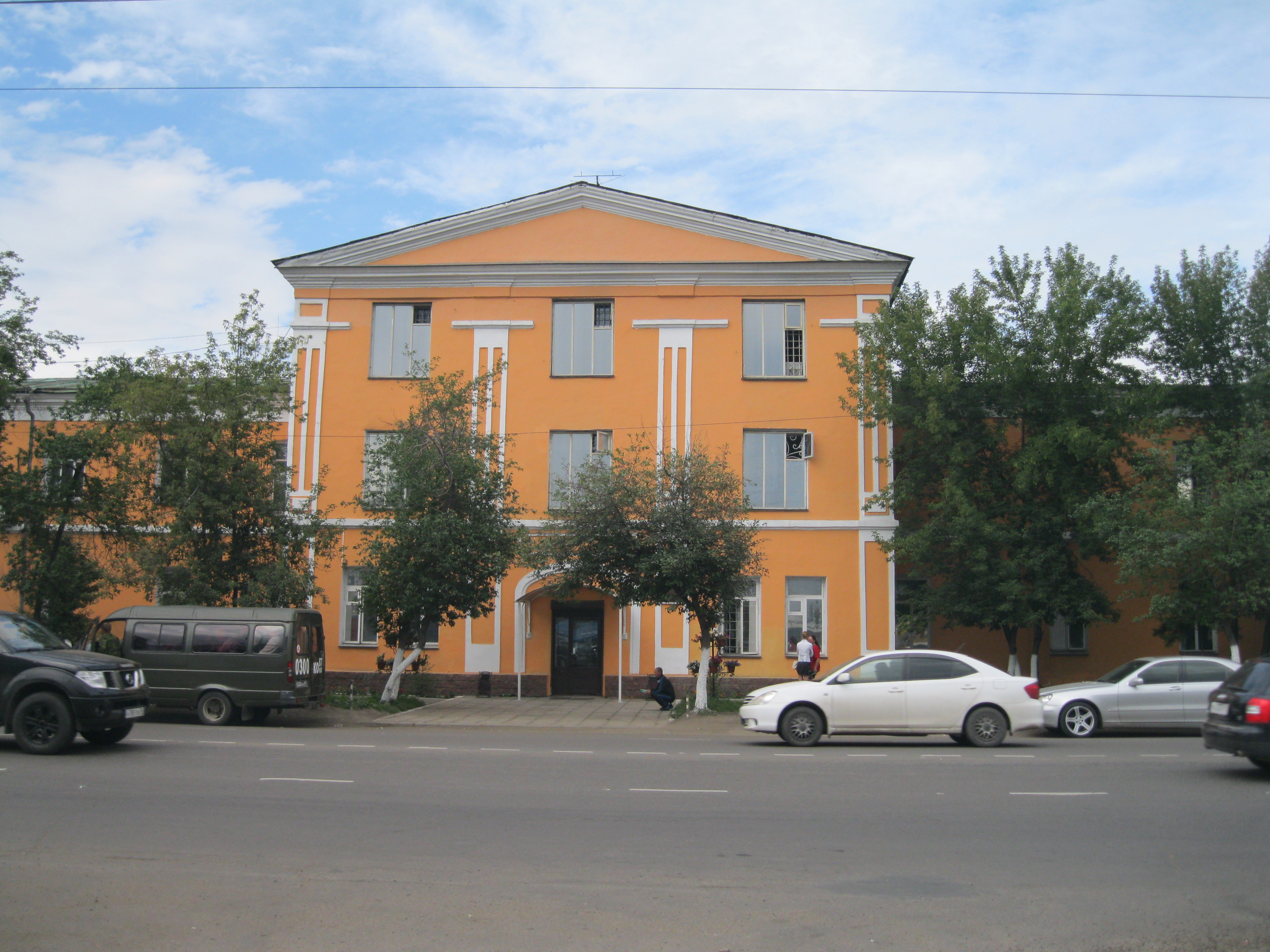
The remand prison No. 1 in Irkutsk

On August 12, 2012, the Investigative Committee transferred the case of Anoufriev and Lytkin to the Irkutsk Regional Court. Officially, the judicial investigation of the case lasted from September 5, 2012, to February 11, 2013, during this period 16 victims and more than 50 witnesses were questioned.

On September 5, 2012, the consideration of the case began, which eventually amounted to 49 volumes (according to other data, 46 and 35 volumes). At the meeting, the court granted Anoufriev's petition to have another lawyer enter the case, in connection with which the court hearing was postponed until September 10; thus, during the trial, the defendants were represented by three lawyers (Lytkin by one and Anoufriev by two).

The meeting on September 10 began with announcement of the indictment, which the prosecutor read out for an hour and a half. In total, Anoufriev and Lytkin were charged with six murders, nine attempted murders, three robberies and desecration of the bodies of the dead. In addition to the killings, the "Molotochniki" were incriminated in the creation of an extremist community. Separately, Artyom Anoufriev was charged with 14 counts of engaging a minor in criminal activities (Lytkin had been 17 for almost all the killings). Anoufriev refused to admit his guilt for the involvement, extremism, attempted murders, robberies, and abuse of the corpses, and of the six murder charges against him, he agreed only with two—the murders of Pirog and Kuydina. Lytkin, on the contrary, only rejected the extremism charge.

In Irkutsk's remand prison No. 1, Anoufriev was placed in a common cell, and Lytkin in a double room. Although the forensic psychiatric examination found both sane, the Anoufriev SIZO was registered as prone to self-mutilation and suicide, and psychologists carried out separate work with him. During the investigative experiment, the suspects were accompanied by twenty operatives because of the fear that local residents would attack them. Danil Semyonov's father wanted to be present at the experiment, but he was not allowed in an attempt to avoid a mob trial. Anoufriev was present only at the verbal identification of the experiment, the technical verification was carried out only by Lytkin. Subsequently, the defendants were placed in different solitary cells, since there was information about a planned murder against both.

The trial was very difficult psychologically. Because of the wide publicity of the criminal case, some witnesses and victims refused to testify, and others did not want to remind themselves of the tragedy. During the trial, several times the court had to declare breaks due to the witnesses fainting. At the trial, Anoufriev, at first, behaved very cynically and carefully outlined the interviews of witnesses, which caused their discontent, but at some point he lost his courage and burst into tears twice in the hall, finally giving his testimony, trying to pin all the murders on Lytkin, claiming that he was only present at the time of the murder, but did not do anything. Vladimir's testimony (that he knew about the crimes, but remained silent because he feared Anoufriev would kill him) provoked indignation in Anoufriev and he denied it all, mentioning that Vladimir had allegedly killed a Caucasian in his time, and at the same time he offered Anoufriev to injure his girlfriend when he quarreled with her. Vladimir, in response, admitted that he actually lied about the murder, so as not to fall out in the eyes of the skinheads (in his words, at the time of trial, he had already departed from them) and denied all accusations against Anoufriev who, at the end of the trial, became firmly insistent that he was involved only in the murders of Pirog and Kuydina. Lytkin, throughout the whole process, looked aloof and behaved inexpressively. One time, after a 4-hour testimony, his head ached, because of which the interrogation was postponed another day, but at the end of the proceedings he began to give short answers with many pauses.

On October 16, 2012, Anoufriev, while in court, inflicted cut wounds to the side of his neck and scratched his stomach with a razor, which he carried in his sock when he was taken from prison to court. He could not explain why he did it. His lawyer Svetlana Kukareva considered this the result of a strong emotional outburst, which was caused by the fact that his mother first appeared in court that day. The media mentioned the case when Anoufriev, in front of one of the meetings, cut his neck with a screw, unscrewed from the sink in the convoy room.

=== Anoufriev's complaints ===
On November 6, 2012, Anoufriev filed a complaint against the operatives and investigators of the OP-2 Akademgorodok, accusing them of cruel psychological and physical treatment during the arrest and no less cruel treatment during his time in the cell. According to him, he made confessions to the murders under pressure from police officers, and after the incident on October 16 in the temporary detention cell in which he was taking breaks during the trial, the escorts handcuffed him to the window bars. Anoufriev also filed a complaint that he did not receive materials on the case, and that on October 3, through guards, he was in the same compartment of a special car with a pair of skinheads who, while also being arrested, were witnesses in the case. The inspection on the fact of self-mutilation did not reveal any irregularities in the actions of the police: it was established that the handcuffs were applied to Anoufriev in accordance with the federal law "On Police", and that there was no indication in his personal file about the need for separate maintenance from other prisoners. Nevertheless, his lawyers noted that a few days after his arrest, the examination recorded an abrasion in the region of the crown of Anoufriev's head, inflicted by a tangential blow of a hard blunt object.

At the beginning of December, at the court hearing, a video was shown of Anoufriev's testimony at the investigative experiment, after which the judge asked the defendant whether he confirms it. However, Anoufriev refuted his words regarding the murder of the homeless man, committed on the night of March 10–11. He wouldn't have been able to into the pneumatics even from two steps, and then testified about the attacks which involved a knife. Anoufriev stated that he told all this in the investigative experiment only because the authorities ordered him to do so. When the judge asked him why he was silent about this matter, Anoufriev replied that he did not have the right to vote, and his lawyer was "sitting like furniture in his office." Then he announced that he was beaten and humiliated by cellmates in the SIZO cell, and when he decided to change his lawyer, he was told it wasn't worth it. He also stated that the protocol for checking testimonies on the spot took place on April 11 (according to other data—April 4) of 2011, and was signed by another person on his behalf. At the request of the public prosecutor, a handwriting examination was appointed, which was entrusted to the Irkutsk forensic laboratory. This was one of the reasons for the delay in the judicial investigation. The examination acknowledged that Anoufriev's signature was genuine, which caused many objections from the latter, who continued to insist that he did not sign the protocols.

From the very beginning of the trial, Anoufriev firmly insisted on his non-involvement in the killings (he confessed only to the murders of Pirog and Kuydina), referring to the fact that his case was never proven guilty. When Lytkin announced that Anoufriev was not involved in the four other murders, the latter began to request that the investigator visit Lytkin and interrogate the convoy on duty. The court denied this, but granted the prosecution's petition—from now on, the killers were separated from the courtroom, while communication between them was excluded.

=== Judicial debate and sentence ===
On February 13, 2013, a judicial debate began about Anoufriev and Lytkin's case. First in the debate was the public prosecutor, who, taking into account all the evidence examined at the court session and the position of the defendants, asked the court to find the defendants guilty and sentence Anoufriev to life imprisonment in a strict regime correctional colony, and Lytkin to 25 years' imprisonment serving the sentence in a strict regime colony. In addition, the prosecutor eventually refused to file charges against Anoufriev for involvement in a criminal activities as a minor, justifying his refusal by saying that the age difference between Anoufriev and Lytkin was only six months.

On February 25 the lawyers of the defendants spoke at the debate. Anoufriev's lawyers asked the court to acquit him, and they didn't take into account the two counts of murder in which he pleaded guilty, referring to the fact that during the murder of the homeless man, Anoufriev was recording with the camera, and the audio recording of Pirog's murder was impossible to establish that he also took part in it. In turn, Lytkin's lawyer insisted on reducing the term of the latter to 20 years' imprisonment.

The defendants's last words were scheduled for March 12, 2013, but it failed, since, according to them, they weren't ready. Then Anoufriev was transferred the next day, but even then they weren't ready, and as a result it took place on March 18. Lytkin refused the right to a last word. Without interrupting, Anoufriev read a prepared text, in which he again asked for forgiveness from the victims, once again rejecting accusations against him:

Thanks to the media on me now is a stain which I can't wash off. My grandfather was a veteran of the Great Patriotic War, and they call me a fascist - the ones from whom he defended us. The materials of the case didn't prove my fault. I plead guilty only in the murder of Olga Pirog, as well as in the abuse of the corpse, but only in the fact that I shot the video. In all other crimes did not participate. It may sound silly, but I myself do not understand why I did it. I do not know what came over me. Sincerely condolences. I believe that there are no people of our age who could not be corrected. You can fix any person at any age. There would be a desire. I have this desire.

On April 2, 2013, the Irkutsk Regional Court sentenced Anoufriev to life imprisonment with service in a special regime colony, and Lytkin to 24 years' imprisonment, of which five years (two of which he had already served before his sentencing) were to be held in prison, and the rest in a strict regime colony. After Lytkin's liberation, he would be restricted in movement for a year, prohibited from leaving the territory. The sentence, which had about 150 pages, was read out for 8 hours, during which one of those present in the hall—a man who, during the killings, was among the combatants patrolling Akademgorodok—fell into a swoon. Lytkin was visibly nervous but did not lower his eyes during the sentencing. Anoufriev stared indifferently at the floor, but upon hearing the judge's verdict, fell on the bench and wept. After the announcement of the verdict, he shouted to the victims' families: "Well, are you satisfied?" (According to other sources, his words were addressed to investigator Yevgeny Karchevsky, who conducted the interrogation). In response, Danil Semyonov's mother, Svetlana, shouted at him: "And you were pleased when my son was killed, the 12-year-old child lying in the ground!" Lytkin did not respond to the verdict and did not look at Anoufriev. The verdict provoked harsh criticism from the victims, who felt that Lytkin deserved a similar life sentence. Svetlana Semyonova filed an appeal and personally wrote a letter to Vladimir Putin. Meanwhile, one of the surviving victims, Nina Kuzmina, considered the verdict against Lytkin fair, even though it was he who had attacked her.

Around October 2013, the killers remained in Irkutsk's detention center. During this time, their lawyers challenged the decision of the regional court in the Supreme Court, where an appeal hearing was held on October 3, at which, by a decision from the Supreme Court, Lytkin's term was reduced from 24 years to 20, as his minor age was taken into account at the time of the majority of murders. Anoufriev's sentence remained unchanged.

=== Civil proceedings ===
In November 2012, the surviving victim Yekaterina Karpova sued Anoufriev and Lytkin in a civil suit for 1 million rubles. Then another two people filed a lawsuit—another one of the surviving victims, who estimated the damage at 800,000 rubles, and the son of Alevtina Kuydina, who estimated the damage at 1 million rubles. During the announcement of the verdict, the Irkutsk Regional Court ruled that the total amount of compensation that the criminals had to pay is 2.75 million rubles, of which 500,000 rubles must be paid to Nina Kuzmina. State prosecutor Alexander Shkinev said that they would have to pay from the money they earn in prison, so they are unlikely to ever pay off their victims.

== Aftermath ==
=== Anoufriev ===
On January 27, 2014, Anoufriev was transferred to Ognenny Ostrov in the Vologda Oblast, where he became the youngest prisoner at the time. In April, journalists from Komsomolskaya Pravda interviewed him, in which he made it clear that he did not repent at all, did not consider himself guilty, and did not agree with the verdict. "Your colleagues helped me get here. I see you need something from me all the time," he said, further saying that he would only talk if he was paid. He added that his family is taking various measures by which he can be released on parole, but he does not count on it. Anoufriev also admitted that he was writing a book, without explaining what it was about.

On April 21, 2016, the Irkutsk Court partially granted Anoufriev's claim for compensation for non-pecuniary damage and collected money from the Ministry of Finance of the Russian Federation in its favor. The amount of compensation wasn't reported.

In February 2017, Anoufriev stated in a report to NTV's infoshow True Gurnov that he was studying law at the University of Latvia.

=== Lytkin ===
==== Incarceration and psychiatric diagnosis ====
During his pre-trial detention, Nikita Lytkin produced at least one written statement that became publicly accessible.

In November 2012, several months before the trial concluded, he authored a letter that was subsequently made public. It remains the only known example of his correspondence available to the general public. While it is presumed that he maintained private communication with his mother and possibly other relatives, no additional letters have been released. This contrasts with co-defendant Artyom Anoufriev, who was noted for maintaining extensive correspondence, including replies to letters from outside admirers.

Following his 2013 conviction, Nikita Lytkin was initially incarcerated in a correctional facility in the Irkutsk region before being transferred to the Sakha Republic later that year.

In 2015, he was moved to Correctional Colony No. 41 (IK-41) in Kemerovo, where a court-ordered forensic psychiatric evaluation diagnosed him with a severe mental disorder. As a result, in August 2016, the Zavodsky District Court of Kemerovo ruled that he should be released from prison and placed in a psychiatric hospital for compulsory treatment.

However, before this ruling was implemented, Lytkin attacked another inmate, striking him multiple times with a metal dustpan in the toilet area of the prison's medical unit. The victim survived the attack, and other prisoners intervened to stop Lytkin.

According to investigative records, Lytkin later admitted that the attack was a deliberate attempt to receive a life sentence and be transferred to a different penal colony, specifically to be housed in the same facility as his co-defendant, Artyom Anoufriev.

As a result, the court overturned its prior ruling on psychiatric treatment, ordered a second forensic psychiatric evaluation, and determined that Lytkin was criminally responsible. On June 1, 2017, he was convicted of attempted murder and sentenced to an additional 11 years in a strict-regime penal colony.

==== Imprisonment in IK-7 and allegations of abuse ====
In 2018, Lytkin was transferred to Correctional Colony No. 7 (IK-7) in Angarsk, where he remained until his death.

The Russian penal system operates under an informal prisoner hierarchy, typically dividing facilities into:

Red Zones (Красные зоны): Prisons where administration maintains strict control, suppressing criminal subcultures.

Black Zones" (Чёрные зоны): Facilities where inmates enforce an internal criminal code, often subjecting low-ranking prisoners to mistreatment, forced labor, and violence.

Officially, IK-7 is classified as a "red zone", meaning prison administration is in control.

Lytkin was assigned to menial labor, including cleaning toilets, which is typically associated with the lowest rank in the prison hierarchy. While there are no direct reports of abuse specific to Lytkin, human rights organizations have raised concerns about prisoner mistreatment in Russia's strict-regime facilities.

==== Death in custody ====
On December 1, 2021, Lytkin was found in his prison cell at IK-7. According to official reports, he had self-inflicted deep cuts on his arms and was discovered during a routine prisoner count on November 28, 2021. Despite receiving emergency medical attention, he died of his injuries two days later, on December 3rd 2021.

According to Russian lawyer and former investigator at the Irkutsk Region Prosecutor's Office, Nikolai Kataev, Lytkin's suspected depression and harassment from other inmates were the cause of Lytkin's suicide.

== Fatalities ==
- December 1, 2010 – Daniil Semyonov (age 12)
- December 16, 2010 – Olga Pirog (age 69)
- January 1, 2011 – unknown homeless man
- February 21, 2011 – Alexander Maximov
- March 10–11, 2011 – Roman Faizullin
- April 3, 2011 – Alevtina Kuydina (age 63)

== See also ==
- Dnepropetrovsk maniacs
- The Cleaners (serial killers)
- Nighttime Killers
- Blood Magic Gang
- List of Russian serial killers

== Literature ==
- Vaske E.V., Kurakina OI. The ideology of man-hating. Psychological and legal analysis of modern manifestations of extremism // Bulletin of the Nizhny Novgorod University. N.I. Lobachevsky: magazine. – 2014. – Vol. 3 (1) . – p. 228 – 233
- Organization of an extremist community: problems of qualification and evidence: manual / P. V. Agapov, etc. .; by ed. V.V. Merkurieva; Academy of the Prosecutor General's Office of the Russian Federation. – M., 2013. – 248 p
