= Abercius =

Abercius (Avercius, Avircius, Avirkios) is a masculine given name that may refer to:

- Abercius of Hieropolis, Christian bishop and saint (feast 22 October)
- Abercius, Christian martyr, brother of Helena (feast May 20)
- Aberoh, Egyptian Christian martyr, brother of Atom (feast July 2)
- Archimandrite Averchie (1806/1818–?), Aromanian monk and schoolteacher
- There are martyrs named Abericius whose feasts are listed under 28 February and 5 December in the Menaea Graeca and the Menologium der Orthodox-Katholischen Kirche des Morgenlandes

== See also ==
- Inscription of Abercius, hagiography of Abercius of Hieropolis
