= Romanus of Samosata =

Saint Romanus

Martyr
- Died: 297; Samosata, Syria
- Venerated in: Roman Catholic Church Orthodox Church
- Canonized: Pre-Congregation
- Feast: December 9 Roman Catholic January 29 Eastern Orthodox

Romanus of Samosata (died 297) was a martyr for Christianity in Syria in 297. He and his companions, Jacob, Philotheus, Hyperechius, Abibus, Julianus, and Paregorius were all subject to a variety of tortures before being hanged to trees and then nailed against them. They are mentioned in the Menaea Graeca and the Menologium der Orthodox-Katholischen Kirche des Morgenlandes. Their feast day is January 29.

Romanus is one of the 140 Colonnade saints which adorn St. Peter's Square.
