= Abiathar and Sidonia =

Saints
- Venerated in: Georgian Orthodox Church
- Feast: 1 October

Abiathar and Sidonia were a legendary Jewish priest of Mtskheta and his daughter. They were attendants to Queen Nana. Abiathar is said to have been the first person Saint Nino converted to Christianity. An apocryphal account of the life and miracles of Saint Nino is attributed to them.

They are regarded as saints in the church in Georgia, and are mentioned in Bessarion's The Saints of Georgia and the Menologium der Orthodox-Katholischen Kirche des Morgenlandes.

It is said that after the death of Christ his Robe was carried to Mtskheta by Elioz, Sidonia's brother. After having listened to her brother's grief story about the death of Christ she "clutched the Robe to her breast and immediately gave up her spirit". She was buried with the Holy Robe in her embrace.

Abiathar and her daughter Sidonia are considered to be the first Georgian writers. A lot of pseudo-epigraphical texts that tell about spreading of Christianity in Georgia are ascribed to them.

Their feast day is celebrated on 1 October in Georgia.

The name "Abiathar" is derived from a Biblical character, a priest of the Jerusalem Temple in the time of King David.

== External sources ==
- Sepiashvili, Otar (2011). Memory Symphony—Chronicles and Interludes of the Fate of Georgian Jews. USA: Xlibris Corporation. p. 98.
