= Nighttime Killers =

Ukrainian criminal duo

- Born: Vladislav Volkovich; Volodymyr Kondratenko; c. 1967; Kyiv, Ukrainian SSR, Soviet Union
- Died: Kondratenko: May 31, 1997
- Cause of death: Suicide
- Other name: The Nighttime Killers
- Penalty: Volkovich: Life imprisonment

Details
- Victims: 16
- Span of crimes: 1991–1996
- Country: Ukraine
- Date apprehended: 1996

The Nighttime Killers (Ukrainian: Нічний Серійник, romanized: Nichnyi Seriinyk) is the media epithet for the killers responsible for a string of brutal murders in Kyiv, Ukraine, between 1991 and 1996. Two men, Vladyslav Volkovich (Ukrainian: Владислав Волкович) and Volodymyr Kondratenko (Ukrainian: Володимир Кондратенко) were arrested and charged with 16 murders. Most victims were shot with a .22 sporting rifle and stabbed or bludgeoned with a wide variety of weapons ranging from stitching awls to bricks and iron bars. The killers claimed that they began the murder spree in order to prepare themselves for an eventual career as contract killers, practicing on the homeless, and continued killing for profit and for fun. Kondratenko killed himself in prison during the trial. Volkovich was found guilty and sentenced to life in prison.

== Murders ==
On June 18, 1996, a 44-year-old factory worker named Yevheniy Osechkin was found dead near the Karavaevi Dachi railway station in Kyiv. An anonymous tipster called the police and claimed that someone was just shot with a silenced pistol. However forensics uncovered that the victim was actually shot with a .22 round (a single shell casing was recovered), and stabbed multiple times. The tipster was never located. Investigation quickly determined that Osechkin, a factory worker, had no enemies, and robbery was ruled out as a motive as Osechkin still had the salary he received the day of the murder on his person.

Investigators then began looking at other murders in the area, and found that some months earlier a homeless man had been shot with a .22 rifle and stabbed in the same area, just 100 meters away from the spot where Osechkin was murdered. Investigators began canvassing the area, and set up surveillance at the train station. Some people that raised the suspicion of the investigators were arrested, but all had alibis for the time of the murders.

Two weeks later a well-known local doctor named Oleksandr Yehorov was shot and killed in his car in broad daylight. Some witnesses to the murder were located, who provided a description of a suspect described as a lone man of about 30 years of age.

Less than an hour after Yehorov's murder, another male victim was found several blocks away, again shot with a .22 rifle and stabbed. Description of a man seen loitering in the area matched the suspect in the Yehorov and the Osechkin murders. Fingerprints were also recovered from both scenes.

However, no match was found for the fingerprints in any databases, and the description offered few leads. The investigation stalled until another murder was reported two weeks later. The new victim was a man named Oleksandr Shpack. Prior to the murder he was at a birthday party with his girlfriend. After getting drunk, Shpack got into an argument with two men who crashed the party. All four then left the party. Shpack was found shot and stabbed a short time later. Shpack's girlfriend provided a description of the two men, which matched the earlier murders. She also remembered that one of the men was named Volodymyr.

=== More victims ===
On September 4, another male victim was found in the streets, shot in the head and the chest with a .22 rifle and stabbed. Shell casings found at the scene tied it with the earlier murders. However, the victim was never identified and no witnesses came forward. The investigation stalled again.

On September 28 at about 10:30 PM, another male victim aged 35 to 40, this time a man named Petr Gromov, was found shot in his vehicle, a VAZ-2106. After being shot twice in the head, Gromov was stabbed multiple times. The killers pushed the body out of the car and tried to drive away, but the shots broke a window and punctured the roof, and the killers abandoned the vehicle less than a block away, apparently concerned that the damage would draw unwanted attention.

Investigators were now convinced that they were dealing with a pair of serial killers who targeted men in mid-to-late 30s. Local militsia (police) was instructed to arrest anyone matching the description on sight. Canvassing apartments near the Hromov murder scene, they located a woman who claimed to recognize one of the suspects as a man named Volodymyr who lived nearby. Police put the building she pointed out under surveillance. Surveillance located an unlocked door in the building, and there was a dead body inside the apartment, also shot and stabbed. The victim was identified as Oleksandr Bykov. His death was estimated to have occurred on September 23. Several unlit matches had been stuck between the door and the frame, which fell out when the door was opened. Investigators surmised that these were markers left by the killers to determine whether the door had been opened in case they ever returned. The apartment was put under constant surveillance, and a man matching the description was seen to approach the building three days later. Unfortunately something spooked him, and the investigators lost the man when he ran into a nearby marketplace.

=== Capture ===
By this time, five more murders had been tied to the .22 killings, with a total of 11 known victims. Investigators suspected that there had been some others. Desperate for leads, the investigators pored over older reports. Crime scene photographs from the Bykov crime scene contained the images of a person matching a suspect's description. The man volunteered to assist the police in search for clues and gave them his name. He was identified as Volodymyr Dmytrovych Kondratenko. However, the investigators did not have his address. Continued surveillance on a Sotzialistychna Street block where the Bykov and Gromov murders took place quickly located Kondratenko loitering with another man who also matched a suspect's description. The second man was later identified as Vladyslav Volkovych. By the time the information was sent up the chain and the two men were ordered detained, the pair claimed one final victim, an unidentified woman they struck and killed while driving drunk at a high speed in a stolen VAZ-2102. The car was stolen in preparation for a burglary of a commercial warehouse, where they also planned to murder the lone guard.

Once detained, the men quickly confessed to over 20 murders, as well as numerous robberies, carjackings, and burglaries.

=== Findings ===
The reasons behind Kondratenko's assistance in the Bykov investigation were quickly uncovered. Apparently Kondratenko had been friends with Bykov for years, and also had an affair with Bykov's wife. Bykov also reportedly owned a pistol that Kondratenko wanted for himself. After the murder he continued to see the victim's wife, and drove her to the morgue and appointments with investigators, ostensibly helping her to look for her husband's killer, all in order to continue their affair.

The killers' MO was also explained, shedding light on the reasons why most witnesses only saw one killer with most victims. By the time the men began killing drivers for their cars, Volkovich would hitch-hike, and ask the drivers to go to an address to pick up a "friend with a box". The waiting friend would be Kondratenko, and the box would contain their .22 TOZ-16 sporting rifle. Kondratenko would immediately shoot the driver, and Volkovich would stab him at the same time. They had apparently murdered at least 7 men for their cars, most of which they later sold.

=== Trial ===
The case quickly went to trial. Two more co-conspirators were identified. Andriy Tymoshyn, a former Senior Customs Inspector, was charged with one of the murders and the subsequent auto theft. Serhiy Tretiachenko, a delivery driver, was charged with assisting Kondratenko with attempted auto theft in a murder/burglary scheme that was cut short by the arrest. Two main suspects, Volkovich and Kondratenko, had confessed to over 20 murders, but many of their earlier victims who had been homeless were never located. The two men were charged with only 16 of the murders.

Days after the trial began, Kondratenko overdosed on prescription medication and died while in police custody. His death was ruled a suicide. After his death, Volkovich attempted to change his testimony to paint Kondratenko as the only trigger man in all of the murders. Tymoshyn also changed his testimony, claiming that he was unaware that the other men planned to kill their victim, and simply went along to rob a taxi driver. Kondratenko had earlier stated that Tymoshyn had offered them a price to kill that particular victim, who was apparently in conflict with the inspector.

After a lengthy trial, all three living suspects were found guilty in August 2000. Volkovich received the sentence of life imprisonment, as the death penalty had been abolished in Ukraine.

== Suspects ==
According to a psychological profile prepared by the prosecution, Kondratenko had been a model child until he started school, when constant physical abuse by his father began to take its toll. Kondratenko was initially a good student, but his perfectionist father would severely beat him for any grade below a 5 or Excellent. Kondratenko's personality quickly changed; first he'd get on his knees and beg his teachers not to give him lower grades, but quickly stopped and became shy and withdrawn. After graduation Kondratenko's father, a construction worker, forced his son to go into an architectural college. Kondratenko dropped out after one semester, and at the age of 18 was drafted into the Soviet Army.

Army service was reportedly hard on Kondratenko, who was frequently injured, once receiving a serious concussion after falling from a tank. He was also constantly abused in the atmosphere of rampant hazing (dedovshchina). He was discharged after the compulsory service, and reported back home in civilian clothes, instantly inviting a beating from his father for not being in uniform. Kondratenko planned to go back to school, but came down with a severe case of jaundice which left permanent disfiguring marks on his face. Kondratenko was so unhappy with his appearance that he refused to go outside for months. He was eventually committed to a psychiatric institution by his parents, but after some time was deemed sane and released. Unable to find a job, and continuing to stay at home most of the time, the conflict between Kondratenko and his father continued to grow. Kondratenko knew that he needed to move out, and in order to move out, he needed money.

Vladyslav Volkovich, according to the prosecution, had "an even less interesting background than Kondratenko". He was reportedly a twin, growing up in an uneventful household with no reported instances of abuse or aggression. Growing up in poverty, Volkovich was always preoccupied with appearances and looking for ways to make money, but did not want a full-time job. He made friends with Kondratenko and the two men often discussed various ways of making money, as well as various philosophical concepts, eventually deciding that "there is no such thing as morals or honor in this world".

== Motivation ==
The two men discussed becoming contract killers, thinking that this would be a perfect job for them. They also discussed killing some of their friends for more immediate financial gain. However they did not know how to look for contract work, and were unsure they'd be able to kill a friend on the first try, so they decided to practice on the homeless. They reportedly killed at least five before risking to attack a more dangerous target. They eventually settled on attacking car owners; owning a personal vehicle was a considerable luxury and a sign of wealth in the former Soviet Union of the early 1990s. However the killers admitted that they did not have much luck killing random car owners, as most of them had little if any money on them, and taking and later selling their cars was difficult. By this time however both men admitted that they enjoyed by itself, and continued to kill even if it didn't bring financial gain.

Speaking of their victims at trial, Volkovich stated that "they were nothing to me, not people, just items in a list". He then added that murders became like a drug to him. "They made me feel like a superman", he said. The only victim he expressed any regret over was their last, the woman he had accidentally hit while drunk driving, and the pair's only known female victim.

== See also ==
- Dnepropetrovsk maniacs, two Ukrainian serial killers who also worked in a group, occasionally robbing their victims.
- The Cleaners (serial killers)
- Academy maniacs
- Blood Magic Gang
- Thrill killing
