= The Saints of Georgia =

The Saints of Georgia is a book of hagiography published by Bessarion. It is a primary source of biographies of saints, including the following:

- Abiathar and Sidonia
- Abibo Joseph

== Sources ==
- Holweck, F. G. A Biographical Dictionary of the Saints. St. Louis, MO: B. Herder Book Co. 1924.
