= Menaea Graeca =

The Greek Menaea (Latin: Menaea Graeca) was a 12-volume set of books published in Venice in 1880 including various hagiographies.

== Contents ==
It includes biographies of the following Christian saints:

- Abercius
- Abercius the Martyr
- Pelagia the Harlot
- Romanus of Samosata
