= Dnepropetrovsk maniacs =

Ukrainian serial killers

Dnipropetrovsk maniacs
- Дніпропетровські маніяки
- Sayenko (left) and Suprunyuk
- Born: 6 May 1988 (age 38) (Sayenko); 20 April 1988 (age 38) (Suprunyuk); Dnipropetrovsk, Ukrainian SSR, Soviet Union
- Citizenship: Ukraine
- Convictions: Premeditated murder and animal cruelty (Sayenko and Suprunyuk) and robbery (Hanzha, Sayenko and Suprunyuk)
- Penalty: Life imprisonment for Sayenko and Suprunyuk; nine years' imprisonment for Hanzha

Details
- Victims: 21
- Span of crimes: 25 June – 16 July 2007
- Country: Ukraine
- State: Dnipropetrovsk Oblast
- Date apprehended: 23 July 2007

The Dnipropetrovsk maniacs (Note: Ukrainian: Дніпропетровські маніяки, romanized: Dnipropetrovski maniiaky; Russian: Днепропетровские маньяки, romanized: Dnepropetrovskiye manyaki) (also known as the Dnepropetrovsk maniacs) are Ukrainian serial killers responsible for a string of murders in Dnipropetrovsk (Note: The murders took place in Dnipro, which was officially known as Dnipropetrovsk until 2016. Contemporary English-language media coverage of the case generally used the Russian-derived spelling "Dnepropetrovsk".) in June and July 2007. The case gained worldwide notoriety after the killers made video recordings of some of the murders, with one of the videos leaking to the Internet. Two 19‑year-olds, Viktor Sayenko (Note: Ukrainian: Віктор Саєнко, romanized: Viktor Saienko; Russian: Виктор Саенко) (born 6 May 1988), and Igor Suprunyuk (Note: Ukrainian: Ігор Супрунюк, romanized: Ihor Supruniuk; Russian: Игорь Супрунюк) (born 20 April 1988), were arrested and charged with 21 murders.

A third conspirator, Alexander Hanzha (Note: Ukrainian: Олександр Ганжа, romanized: Oleksandr Hanzha; Russian: Александр Ганжа, romanized: Aleksandr Ganzha) (born February 1988), was charged with two armed robberies that took place before the murder spree. On 11 February 2009, all three defendants were found guilty. Sayenko and Suprunyuk were sentenced to life imprisonment, while Hanzha received nine years in prison. The lawyers for Sayenko and Suprunyuk launched an appeal, which was dismissed by the Supreme Court of Ukraine in November 2009.

== Murders ==
The first two murders occurred late on 25 June 2007. The first victim was a 33-year-old woman, Yekaterina Ilchenko, who was walking home after having tea at her friend's apartment. According to Sayenko's confession, he and Suprunyuk were "out for a walk". Suprunyuk had a hammer. As Ilchenko walked past, Suprunyuk "spun around" and hit her in the side of the head. Ilchenko's body was found by her mother at 5:00 a.m. Within an hour of the first murder, the two men attacked and killed Roman Tatarevich, as he slept on a bench near the first murder scene. Tatarevich's head was smashed with blunt objects numerous times, rendering him unrecognizable. The bench was located across the street from the local public prosecutor's office.

On 1 July, two more victims, Yevgenia Grischenko and Nikolai Serchuk, were found murdered in the nearby town of Novomoskovsk. On the night of 6 July, three more people were murdered in Dnipro. The first was Egor Nechvoloda, a recently discharged army recruit, who was bludgeoned while walking home from a nightclub. His mother found the body in the morning by their apartment building on Bohdan-Khmelnytsky Street. Yelena Shram, a 28‑year-old night guard, was then murdered around the corner on Kosiora Street. According to Sayenko's taped confession, as Shram walked toward them, Suprunyuk struck her with the hammer he had been hiding under his shirt and hit her several more times after she fell. She had been carrying a bag filled with clothes. The men picked up the bag, used the clothes to clean the hammer, and threw the bag out. Later the same night, the men murdered a woman named Valentina Hanzha (no apparent relation to co-defendant Alexander Hanzha), a mother of three with a disabled husband.

The next day, 7 July, two 14‑year-old boys from Pidhorodne, a nearby town, were attacked as they went fishing. One of the two friends, Andrei Sidyuk, was killed, but the other, Vadim Lyakhov, managed to escape after hiding in the woods. Later, on 12 July, 48‑year-old Sergei Yatzenko, disabled by a recent bout with cancer, went missing while riding his Dnepr motorcycle. His battered body was found four days later, with signs of a savage attack visible even after four days in the summer heat. Just days later, on 14 July 45‑year-old Natalia Mamarchuk was riding her scooter in the nearby village of Diyovka. As she was passing through a wooded area, two men approached her and knocked her down. They then bludgeoned her to death with a hammer or pipe and drove off on her scooter. Local witnesses gave chase but lost sight of the attackers.

Thirteen more murders followed, often with multiple bodies found on the same day. In addition to the earlier sprees, two victims were found each day from 14 July to 16. Victims were seemingly selected at random. Many were vulnerable to attack, including children, the elderly, vagrants, or people under the influence of alcohol. Most victims were killed using blunt objects, including hammers and steel construction bars. Blows were often directed at their faces, leaving them unrecognizable. Many victims were also mutilated and tortured; some victims had their eyes gouged out while they were still alive. One pregnant woman had her fetus cut from her womb. No sexual assault on any victim was reported. Some victims were also robbed of their cellphones and other valuables, with their possessions pawned to second-hand shops in the area. However, most victims had their belongings left intact. The murders covered a large geographical area. Aside from Dnipro, many occurred in outlying areas of the Dnipropetrovsk Oblast.

== Investigation ==
No official link between the murders was made until the 7 July attack on two boys in Pidhorodne. Vadim Lyakhov, the survivor, was initially placed under arrest, suspected of murdering his friend. He was reportedly denied access to counsel and beaten by police during questioning. However, it quickly became clear that he was not responsible for his friend's death, given that the murder was connected with the developing murder spree. Lyakhov cooperated with the investigators to create sketches of the attackers. Two local children who had also witnessed the 14 July Mamarchuk attack, hidden in a tent just a few feet away, also provided a detailed description corroborating the one given by Lyakhov.

A task force was quickly sent from Kyiv, headed by lead criminal investigator Vasily Paskalov. The manhunt soon grew to encompass most local law enforcement, and reportedly over 2,000 investigators worked on the case. The investigation was initially kept secret. No official information about the murders was released, and local people were not warned about possible attacks or provided with descriptions of the suspects. However, rumors of the attacks kept most of the local population home at night. Eventually, investigators selectively distributed sketches and lists of stolen property to local pawn shops, and soon, the stolen property began to be identified in the pawn shops of the city's Novokodatskyi District.

=== Suspects ===
The three suspects Viktor Sayenko, Igor Suprunyuk, and Alexander Hanzha were arrested on 23 July 2007. Suprunyuk attempted to sell a cellphone stolen from a victim in a local pawn shop, asking for ₴150 (around US$30 in 2007). After making a phone call from the shop, Sayenko and Suprunyuk were arrested at the cash register. Hanzha was arrested at home, reportedly managing to flush other stolen cellphones and jewelry down the toilet. The items were recovered, but all information on the phones was lost.

The three suspects had attended school together, and by age 14 found some common ground. "Me and Igor [Suprunyuk] were both afraid of heights, and we were afraid we'd be beaten up by bullies", Sayenko stated during questioning. Suprunyuk sought advice on getting rid of their fears, which led the boys to stand on a balcony of their 14th-floor apartment for hours, hanging over the railing. This reportedly had a positive effect on their fear of heights. Hanzha was reportedly the most squeamish of the three. He had a blood phobia, and even refused to bathe his kitten, afraid he might scald it. Suprunyuk suggested tackling the fears by torturing stray dogs. The boys captured dogs in a wooded area near their house, hanged them from trees, disemboweled them, and took pictures next to the corpses. Prosecution evidence included many of these photos taken by the suspects while underage. Some photos show the boys drawing swastikas and other symbols with animal blood, and giving the Nazi salute. In one photo, Suprunyuk poses sporting a toothbrush mustache, similar to Adolf Hitler's mustache. Suprunyuk was born on 20 April, the same day as Hitler, and referred to this fact. A long video showing the three torturing a white kitten was shown in court.

When the boys were 17, Suprunyuk beat up a local boy and stole his bike, which he then sold to Sayenko. Both were arrested, but did not go to jail due to their age. After high school, Hanzha drifted between odd jobs, which included a pastrychef and a construction worker. At his arrest he had been unemployed for some time. Sayenko went to a metallurgy institute part-time and worked as a security guard. Suprunyuk remained officially unemployed but made a living driving his green Daewoo Lanos as an unlicensed taxi. The car was reportedly a birthday gift from his parents.

Some months before the murder spree, Suprunyuk – with the help of Sayenko and Hanzha – began picking up passengers and robbing them. A green Daewoo with a taxicab's checkerboard marking was often described as the vehicle used in the murders. According to the suspects' confessions, some murder victims were picked up as passengers in the cab. Hanzha reportedly participated in one where two men were robbed and then declined to take part in any further attacks.

Local media reported the suspects had wealthy influential parents with ties to local law enforcement. Vladimir Suprunyuk, Suprunyuk's father, in his interview for Segodnya stated that he had been employed at Yuzhmash as a test pilot, often flying with Leonid Kuchma, the future president of Ukraine, and continuing to serve as his personal pilot on domestic flights after Kuchma's rise to power. Local authorities, including deputy interior minister Nikolay Kupyanskiy, initially referred to the supposed influence of the suspects' families, but later denied the assessment, claiming that all three suspects came from poor families. However, Sayenko was represented in court by his father, Igor Sayenko, a lawyer.

=== Trial ===
The three men were charged with involvement in 29 separate incidents, including 21 murders and eight more attacks where victims survived. Suprunyuk was charged with 27 of the cases, including 21 counts of capital murder, eight armed robberies, and one count of animal cruelty. Sayenko was charged with 25 instances, including 18 murders, five robberies, and one count of animal cruelty. Hanzha was charged with two counts of armed robbery stemming from a 1 March 2007 incident in Kamianske.

All three confessed quickly, although Suprunyuk later withdrew his confession. Their trial began in June 2008. Suprunyuk pleaded not guilty, while the other two suspects pleaded guilty to all charges. Viktor Chevguz, Suprunyuk's original defense lawyer, left the case after reportedly being disappointed that his client's plea of insanity was not accepted. Lawyers for the victims' families argued that the level of care taken by the killers during their crime spree meant that they were fully aware of their actions.

Prosecution evidence included blood-stains on the suspects' clothing and video recordings of the murders. The defense denied that the people in the videos were the suspects, claiming serious problems with the investigation, including at least 10 more murders covered up by the prosecution, supposed cover-ups of additional arrests of people with powerful connections who were released without being charged, even naming some of the additional people supposedly involved with the murders. The case was heard by a panel of judges chaired by judge Ivan Senchenko. The prosecution asked for life imprisonment for Sayenko and Suprunyuk, and 15 years of hard labor for Hanzha. Ukraine has no capital punishment since February 2000 after the Constitutional Court ruled the death penalty unconstitutional in December 1999.

=== Motivation ===
The prosecution did not establish a motive behind the killings. Local media reported the killers had the plan to get rich from the murder videos they recorded. One suspect's girlfriend reported that they planned to make forty separate videos of murders. This was corroborated by a former classmate who claimed he often heard Suprunyuk was in contact with an unknown "rich foreign website operator" who ordered forty snuff videos and would pay much more money once they were made. Regional security chief Ivan Stupak rejected the claim that the murders were committed to make internet snuff videos, saying that there was no evidence of this. Deputy interior minister Nikolay Kupyanskiy commented "For these young men, murder was like entertainment or hunting". At the trial, it emerged that Suprunyuk collected newspaper cuttings about the case. Some photographs of the crimes had captions added, including: "The weak must die. The strongest will conquer."

=== Defense claims ===
The legal team defending the suspects consisted of three lawyers, one for each suspect. All three lawyers were originally court-appointed, but after the initial hearings, Sayenko requested to be represented by his father because his appointed lawyer apparently graduated from law school only two months earlier. The request was granted, which significantly delayed the proceedings as Sayenko's father familiarized himself with the evidence. Igor Sayenko became the most prominent figure on the defense, giving numerous interviews and taking a lead role in court proceedings.

Hanzha's attorneys based their defense on the fact that he never participated in the murder spree, and was involved only with a single incident four months before the killings began, in which two men were robbed in the nearby town of Dniprodzerzhynsk. Hanzha admitted his guilt, hoping for leniency in sentencing.

The defense strategy for the other two suspects was to attack the prosecution on a wide front. Multiple investigators were called to the stand, including the leader of the arrest team and the lead investigator in the case. The defense claimed illegal searches, improperly kept records, and problems during questioning. Igor Sayenko raised questions about the videotape of the searches conducted in the suspects' apartments. According to Sayenko, the tape constantly stops and restarts, showing the evidence obtained only after being picked up by investigators but never the actual moment of discovery. The legal team also denied that the people in the murder videos were the suspects.

In an interview with Komsomolskaya Pravda, Igor Sayenko claimed that a fourth suspect named Danila Kozlov was initially charged with the murders. Tatiana Shram, a sister of victim Elena Shram, also stated in an interview that she saw Kozlov's name mentioned in court documents and that Kozlov was reportedly aware of the murders and was with the suspects just before her sister was murdered. Shram further stated that the investigators told her that Kozlov remains free because he "did not murder anyone", and when her attorney attempted to bring up the matter in court, the judge "asked him to sit down".

Igor Sayenko continued to speculate on the influence of the families of the "real killers", claiming that he conducted an interview with an escaped victim who wanted his identity kept secret for fear for his life. This unnamed victim claimed that he identified the suspects in his attack and that two other men were identified and arrested. The suspects were supposedly released an hour later due to pressure from their families, and two of the investigators were fired. Sayenko stated in court that four days before the three suspects were arrested, police caught two men and a woman committing one of the murders. The suspects attacked the police officers but were arrested and booked under the names of Sayenko and Suprunyuk, but they were not the men currently on trial. "But now these details are being covered up", Sayenko said in court. "The investigators claim that this did not happen. But there are people, officers in the Militsiya, who on July 19, 2007, received reports that those three were arrested. [...] But, alas, it turned out that the persons arrested had powerful parents. So the information was quickly suppressed, and instead, my son and two of his friends were railroaded. I also believe that the girl arrested on that day has since left the country and is now in Germany."

The defense team also claimed the prosecution withheld from the court information that exonerated their clients. Igor Sayenko claimed the police interviewed witnesses and recovered evidence from two additional murders. The suspects had a strong alibi for the time of these murders, so all information on these crimes was removed from the case.

Sayenko's defense claimed that he had a "psychological dependence" on Suprunyuk, whom they called the ring-leader. They claimed that Suprunyuk repeatedly threatened Sayenko and that Sayenko feared for his life. Sayenko testified in court that he was in constant fear of Suprunyuk since the 7th grade.

The strategy of the defense team received some support from the victims' families, who were reportedly dissatisfied with the slow-moving legal process and an alleged cover-up by the investigators. Some victims' relatives told the media they planned to begin an independent organization to monitor the court proceedings. The authorities in Ukraine strongly denied that a fourth person was involved in the killings who could still be at large and said that rumors of similar crimes taking place since the arrest of the three suspects were unfounded.

=== Murder videos and photographs ===
The suspects' cellphones and personal computers contained multiple video recordings of the murders. A video was leaked to the Internet under the title 3 Guys 1 Hammer, showing the murder of 48‑year-old Sergei Yatzenko. He is seen lying on his back in a wooded area and is struck repeatedly in the face with a hammer held inside a plastic bag. One attacker stabs Yatzenko in the eye and abdomen with a screwdriver. Yatzenko is then struck with the hammer to ensure he is dead. The attack lasts over six minutes, during which the victim lapses in and out of consciousness. One murderer is seen smiling at the camera during the video. The murderers walk back to their car, showing that the crime took place close to the side of a road, next to their parked car. They discuss the murder calmly, expressing mild surprise that the victim was still breathing after a screwdriver was plunged into his exposed brain. The suspects then wash their hands and the hammer with a water bottle and begin to laugh. Only two suspects appear to be present in the video, with one always behind the camera.

The suspects were also found in possession of multiple photographs showing them attending the funerals of the victims. They can be seen smiling and "flipping off" the coffins and gravestones. Evidence of animal abuse was also shown in court, with the suspects posing alongside mutilated animal corpses.

The photographic and video evidence was shown in court on 29 October 2008, as part of a larger presentation of over 300 photographs and two videos. The defense objected to the presentation, claiming that the evidence was obtained illegally and that the subjects shown in the video and the photographs were digitally altered to resemble the suspects. When Sayenko and Suprunyuk were asked if they recognized the people in the photographs, they replied that they did not. Judge Ivan Senchenko responded by stating: "You are not blind." Valery Voronyuk, an expert on film and video editing, testified that the video was not faked or altered. The court rejected all defense objections, accepted the prosecution's argument that the material was genuine, and showed the suspects in the act of murdering their victims.

=== Victim in the video ===
The man whose murder was recorded in the leaked video was identified as Sergei Yatzenko, a 48 year-old man from the village of Taroms'ke. His murder took place on 12 July 2007, and his body was found on 16 July. He had recently been forced into retirement due to a cancerous tumor in his throat. The treatment left him unable to speak for some time, but Yatzenko was unhappy with being unable to work and continued to find odd jobs around the village. He took on small construction work, repaired cars, wove baskets, and cooked for his family. He was starting to regain his voice at the time he was murdered. Yatzenko was married, and had two sons and one grandchild. He also looked after his disabled mother.

At around 14:30 on the day of the murder, he called his wife to say he was going to fill his motorcycle and visit his grandchild. He never arrived at his grandson's house, and his cellphone was turned off by 18:00. His wife, Lyudmila, called a friend and walked around the village, afraid that her husband might have fallen ill or had a motorcycle accident. They could not locate any sign of him. They also could not file a missing person's report, since in Ukraine a person cannot be declared missing until at least 72 hours after last being seen. The next day, Lyudmila posted photographs of her husband around the village and enlisted more local help to search the surrounding area. Four days later, a local who saw one of Lyudmila's posters remembered seeing an abandoned Dnepr-bike in a remote wooded area by a garbage dump. He took Yatzenko's relatives to the scene, where they discovered his mutilated and decomposing body.

The video of Yatzenko's murder was unknown to the public until a court session on 29 October 2008. The unedited video of the murder was shown as part of a large presentation by the prosecution, causing shock in the gallery. The court agreed with the prosecution that the video was genuine, showing Suprunyuk attacking the victim and Sayenko behind the camera.

The video showing the murder of Sergei Yatzenko was leaked to a shock site based in the United States and dated 4 December 2008. Ekaterina Levchenko, adviser to Ukraine's minister of the interior, was critical of the leak but admitted that control of videos on the Internet was "virtually impossible". Caitlin Moran of The Times watched part of the video and recalled her reaction in her column in January 2009.

=== Sentencing ===
Suprunyuk photographed with a hammer; the court described the motive of the killers as "morbid self-affirmation".

On 11 February 2009, the court in Dnipro found Sayenko and Suprunyuk guilty of premeditated murder and sentenced both to life imprisonment. Suprunyuk was found guilty of 21 murders, Sayenko of 18. They also received fifteen-year sentences after being found guilty on the robbery charges. Hanzha, who was not involved in the killings, was found guilty of robbery and sentenced to nine years in prison. Sayenko and Suprunyuk were also found guilty on the animal cruelty charges. Hanzha said of Sayenko and Suprunyuk: "If I had known the atrocities that they were capable of committing, I would have not gone near them at gunpoint." The judge stated in the verdict that the main motive for the crimes had been a desire for "morbid self-affirmation". Referring to the accused, the court noted "the poverty of their emotional world, and their absence of interest in people and moral standards".

The court's verdict was several hundred pages long and read out over two days. The lawyers for Sayenko and Suprunyuk announced their intention to appeal, saying that the authenticity of the photographic and video evidence was not established beyond a reasonable doubt. The claim was dismissed by Edmund Saakian, a lawyer for one of the victims' families, who commented: "In theory a photo can be faked, but to fake a forty-minute video would require a studio and a whole year." Larissa Dovgal, a representative of the victims' families, claimed other perpetrators involved in the crimes could still be at large.

The parents of Sayenko and Suprunyuk repeated their belief in the innocence of their sons. Vladimir Suprunyuk claimed that Igor had been tortured to extract his confession, with the police covering his head and forcing him to inhale cigarette smoke. Speaking at a televised press conference, he cited irregularities in the investigation and said that the case against his son was false. Sayenko claimed that his son was a scapegoat and that the crimes were committed by relatives of senior officials. The parents stated their intent to appeal to the Supreme Court of Ukraine and the European Court of Human Rights. The parents of Sayenko and Suprunyuk also argued that the sentence on Hanzha was too lenient. An opinion poll conducted in Dnipro found that 50.3% of people believed that the sentence was fair, and 48.6% believed that the sentence should have been more severe. In April 2011, a poll found that nearly 60% of Ukrainians wanted the death penalty available for serial killings where judicial error had been ruled out.

=== Appeal ===
On 18 August 2009, the Supreme Court of Ukraine referred the case back to the Dnipro regional court of appeal. The move was welcomed by Igor Sayenko, who stated that it was a step toward clearing his son's name. Speaking at a press conference, Igor Sayenko and Vladimir Suprunyuk repeated their belief that the case was based on fabricated evidence. A spokesperson for the prosecutor's office said that the decision to refer the case back to the appeal court was procedural, and they were confident that the verdict would be upheld. The appeal was scheduled for 5 October 2009. In an interview with the newspaper Novi Most, the mothers of Sayenko and Suprunyuk said that their children were being treated well in prison. It was also reported that Igor Sayenko was considering setting up a website about the case.

On 24 November 2009, the Supreme Court of Ukraine upheld the life sentences passed on Sayenko and Suprunyuk in February 2009. Hanzha did not appeal his nine-year sentence.

=== Release of Hanzha ===
In April 2019, it was reported that Alexander Hanzha had been released from prison after serving nine years, and is married with two children.

== Media ==
=== Chilean documentary ===
Suprunyuk waits at the roadside before the murder of Sergei Yatzenko on 12 July 2007. The yellow plastic bag conceals the hammer used in the attack. A longer version of the Yatzenko murder video was obtained by the Chilean TV-documentary series Aquí en Vivo.

On 2 August 2010, the Chile television channel MEGA broadcast a documentary about the case. It was titled Los maníacos del martillo (The Hammer Maniacs) and ran for 1 hour and 25 minutes as part of the investigative series Aquí en Vivo (Here, live). Journalist Michele Canale flew to Dnipro and interviewed a range of people involved in the case.

The parents of Sayenko and Suprunyuk maintained the innocence of their children, while detectives involved in the case gave their recollections and repeated the lack of confirmation for the theory that the murder videos had been shot as snuff films for sale overseas. Lidia Mikrenischeva, an elderly woman who survived a hammer attack and helped to identify the killers in court, was also interviewed. She recalled being struck on the head from behind and falling to the ground, but her life was saved when the dogs accompanying her barked loudly and scared off the attackers. Natalia Ilchenko, the mother of the first known victim Ekaterina Ilchenko, recalled finding her daughter unrecognizable after the hammer attack and commented that the killers should not be compared to animals because they killed for fun.

The documentary was notable for showing a wide range of previously unseen photographs and video material from the case. From an anonymous source, the filmmakers obtained a longer and unedited version of the cellphone video showing the murder of Sergei Yatzenko. Sayenko and Suprunyuk are seen standing at the woodland roadside next to Suprunyuk's Daewoo Lanos taxi, waiting for a suitable victim to arrive and discussing what they are going to do. At one point, Suprunyuk is seen looking through binoculars for any approaching vehicles. He can also be seen posing with a hammer, which he conceals inside a yellow plastic bag. After 20 minutes, Sergei Yatzenko arrives on a bicycle and is knocked to the ground before the attack in the woods next to the road begins. Yatzenko's children were asked to take part in the documentary, but they declined. According to the commentary, at least five more murder videos are known to exist. The Yatzenko video was shown to the Chilean horror-film director Jorge Olguín, who was so disturbed that he was unable to watch all of it. The documentary also showed brief excerpts from a five-minute video of the murder of another victim, an unidentified man. At one point in the video, the killers comment that the man has a gold tooth. The man was killed with blows to the head and a knife, with some of his personal belongings taken as trophies.

The documentary also showed a video recording of Sayenko's confession, in which he admits that robbery was a motive for some of the killings. A video of Hanzha was also shown, with his face bruised after an alleged beating by the police. Michele Canale attempted to obtain an interview with the killers in prison but was denied by the Ukrainian authorities. A range of motives for the killings was examined, and it was concluded that despite the court verdict, there are still unanswered questions about the case.

== Alleged copycat case in Irkutsk ==
On 5 April 2011, two Russian youths, Artyom Anoufriev (Russian: Артём Ануфриев) (born 1992) and Nikita Lytkin (Russian: Никита Лыткин) (born 1993), known as the Academy maniacs (Russian: Академовские маньяки) were arrested in connection with six murders and attacks on residents in Akademgorodok in Irkutsk. The attacks, which involved a mallet and knife, began in December 2010. Both were arrested after a video recording showing a female body being mutilated with a knife was found on a camera belonging to Lytkin's uncle, who had become suspicious. According to media reports, the youths were influenced by reading about the Dnipropetrovsk maniacs on the Internet. A psychiatric examination found them sane, and they told doctors they chose weak people as their victims. On 2 April 2013, Anoufriev was sentenced to life imprisonment and Lytkin to 24 years in prison.

== See also ==
- Blood Magic Gang
- Nighttime Killers
- The Cleaners (serial killers)
