= Blood Magic Gang =

Russian serial killer gang

The "Blood Magic Gang" was a gang of Russian serial killers, organized in 2007 by 19-year-old Irkutsk resident Konstantin Shumkov. The gang consisted of teenagers from dysfunctional families aged 14-15 years, who lived in Leninsky District of the city. According to the investigation, from January to June 2008, Shumkov and four teenagers murdered five helpless elderly people, participated in one rape, and also caused serious injury to a further three people. On 1 March 2010, the Irkutsk Regional Court sentenced Shumkov to 25 years' imprisonment, and the juvenile offenders to various terms of imprisonment ranging from 6 to 10 years.

== Influence ==
Artyom Anoufriev and Nikita Lytkin, who committed six murders and a series of attacks in the Irkutsk's Academgorodok region during the period from December 2010 to April 2011, showed interest in the activities of the Blood Magic Gang. In particular, in one of the social networks Lytkin created a group called "Irkutsk anti-bum gang: Blood Magic".

== See also ==
- Academy maniacs
- Dnepropetrovsk maniacs
- The Cleaners (serial killers)
- Nighttime Killers
- List of Russian serial killers
