= Joseph of Alaverdi =

Georgian saint

Saint Joseph of Alaverdi
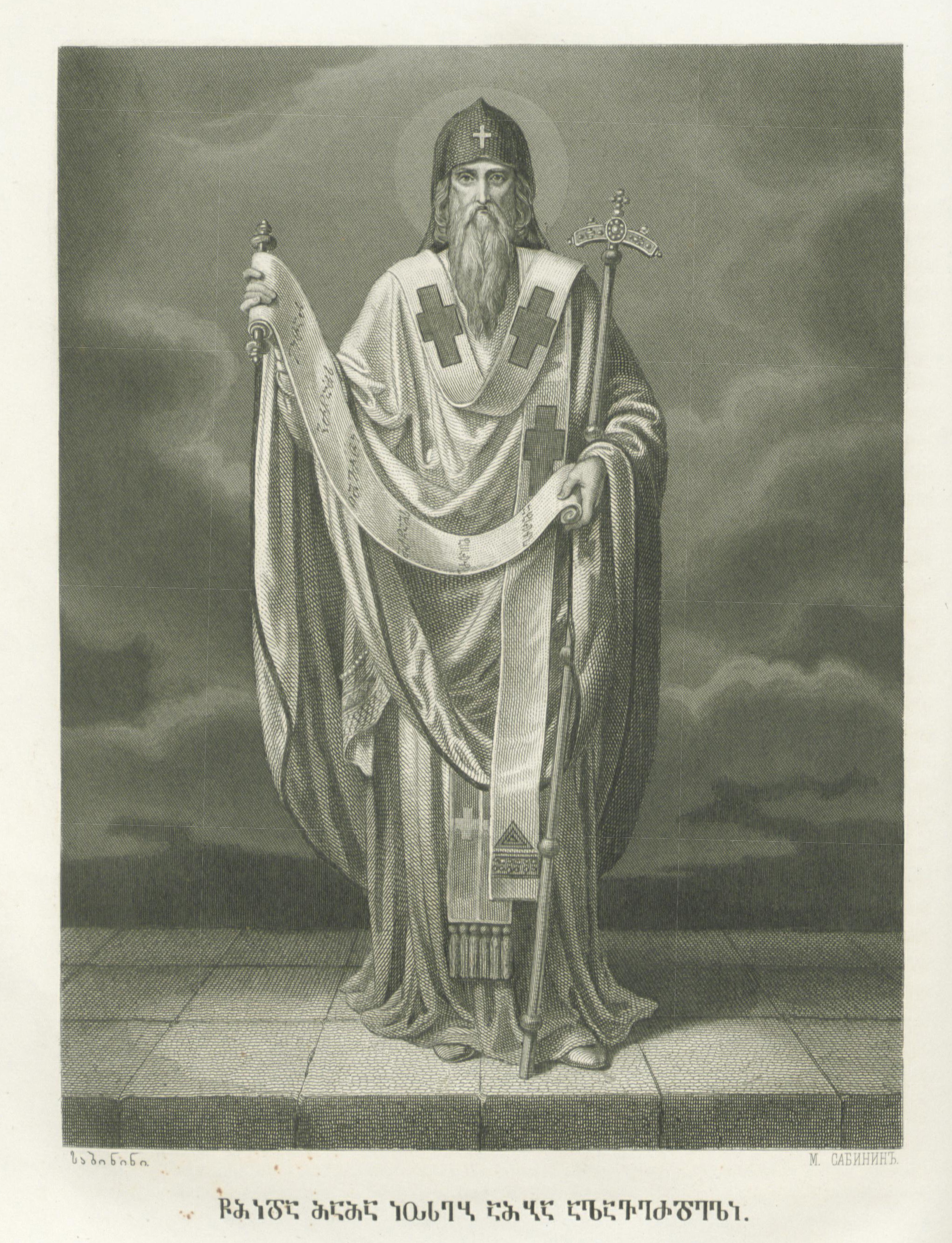
- Joseph illustrated by Mikhail Sabinin, c. 1882

Abbot and Monk
- Born: 6th century Antioch, Syria
- Died: c. 590; Alaverdi Monastery, Georgia
- Venerated in: Georgian Orthodox Church; Catholic Church
- Feast: September 15

Joseph of Alaverdi (Georgian: იოსებ ალავერდელი, romanized: ioseb alaverdeli) was a saint who founded a monastery in Alaverdi and served as abbot. A native of Syria, he was a disciple of John of Zedazeni and one of the Thirteen Assyrian Fathers. He is mentioned in Bessarion's The Saints of Georgia. His feast day is celebrated on September 15.

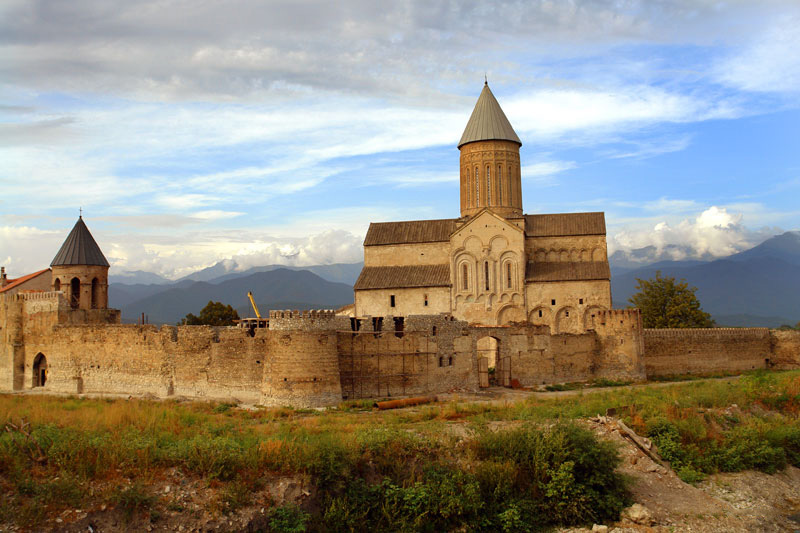
Alaverdi monastery in Kakheti, Georgia
