= The Cleaners (serial killers) =

Russian serial killer gang

- Чистильщики
- Years active: 2014-2015
- Territory: Moscow and Yaroslavl Oblasts, Russia
- Membership: Pavel Voitov; Elena Lobacheva; Artur "Narcis" Narcissov; Maxim "Zakirka" Pavlov; Vladislav "Persik" Karataev
- Activities: Murder, 15+ victims; Robbery

The Cleaners (Russian: Чистильщики, romanized: Chistilshchiki) were a gang of Russian serial killers and neo-Nazis. Between 2014 and 2015, they killed more than 15 people in Moscow, the Moscow Oblast and the Yaroslavl Oblast. Their victims of choice were mainly the homeless and alcoholics. On October 23, 2017, the Moscow City Court sentenced the member Pavel Voitov to life imprisonment, Elena Lobacheva to 13 years' imprisonment and Maxim Pavlov to 9 years and 6 months' imprisonment in a penal colony. Vladislav Karataev was sentenced to 16 years, and Artur Narcissov to 9 years and 6 months, which were to be served in a corrective labour colony.

== Murders ==
The members met in far-right groups on the social media website VKontakte. The leading role among the participants was taken by Pavel Voitov: he distributed roles, made decisions and actively led the activities of the gang. The motives for the killings were the desire to "clean the city", and "hatred of alcoholics and homeless people". According to the investigators, they wanted to "contrast themselves with others and show their superiority".

They committed murders with particular cruelty in different parts of Moscow, as well as the Moscow Oblast and the Yaroslavl Oblast, from July 2014 and February 2015. Victims were found not far from the Belorussky railway tracks, sometimes in the Eastern Administrative District. The corpses were subsequently found in deserted places, where there were no surveillance cameras (under bridges, near fences, garages, in abandoned hangars or on far-away glades in forest parks):

- one killed at the Belorussky station, with 44 knife wounds on the body;
- one killed at the hippodrome, with 18 hammer blows and 51 stab wounds on the body;
- one killed in Begovaya, with 35 stab wounds on the body;
- one killed under the bridge near Workers' Village, with 46 stab wounds and 2 blows from a stone on the body;
- two killed on Izmaylovsky Boulevard, one of them with 15 stab wounds and 10 blows from a hammer, and the other sustaining 13 stab wounds;
- one killed next to Filevsky Park, with 48 stab wounds on the body;
- one killed in Nagornaya, with 9 knife wounds on the body;
- one killed in Odintsovo, with 50 stab wounds on the body;
- one killed near Kurskaya, with 48 stab wounds and 6 blows from a hammer on the body;
- one killed on Lilac Boulevard, with 84 stab wounds on the body;
- one killed in Kuskovo, with 171 stab wounds and 5 hammer blows on the body;
- two killed on Bryansky Post Street, with one sustaining 42 stab wounds and 2 hammer blows, and the other sustaining 35 stab wounds.

== Members ==
The five members of the gang included: Pavel Voitov, Elena Lobacheva, Artur "Narcis" Narcissov, Maxim "Zakirka" Pavlov and Vladislav "Persik" Karataev. Lobacheva and Narcissov lived in Moscow. Lobacheva had grown up on the outskirts of Moscow near the Vykhno metro station, and after school, she worked first as a courier, then as an assistant accountant. Before the murders, she had a suspended sentence for a series of thefts. Narcissov worked in a warehouse, and also as a courier. Karataev was born and lived in Pavlovo, 70 kilometres away from Nizhny Novgorod, with his father raising him. He previously had resided in a psychiatric hospital and had taken medication. The youngest of the group, Maxim Pavlov, was 16 at the time of the crimes, and lived in Rostov, Yaroslavl Oblast.

The leader of the gang Pavel Voitov was registered with his grandmother—a war veteran—in the Ruza District of the Moscow Oblast. During the investigation, Voitov claimed that he lived through robbing people and stealing mobile phones from passers-by. But the numerous cases listed by him, with the exception of one, were not confirmed, or at least there were no reports to the police from the victims. From five to thirteen years old, he lived with his parents on Izmailovsky Boulevard, then, after his parents divorced, he spent some time in Riga with his father, where in 2012 he was sentenced to a year of imprisonment for the desecration of graves at a Jewish cemetery. Voitov wanted to be a soldier, and, together with Karataev and Pavlov, tried to go to war against the rebels in the far-right Azov Battalion, but all three were instead deployed on the Russian-Ukrainian border, and then returned home to Moscow by bus.

All of the members led a healthy lifestyle and did not drink anything stronger than beer. Subsequent psychological examinations determined that all members except Karataev to be sane; Karataev was recognized as partially sane.

== Investigation and arrest ==
In the fall of 2014, operatives paid attention to a similar style of murders in different parts of the city: victims were tricked into visiting scarcely populated or deserted areas, mostly at night, then hit with a hammer first and struck with dozens of knives afterwards, the victims usually being heavily drunk or homeless, sometimes guest workers. Suspecting that all the crimes were committed by the same people, the investigators combined them into one case; the investigation went without serious clues for a long time. Suspicion fell on supporters of Nazi ideology, and relevant groups in social networks were actively studied, but no trace of crimes could be found online.

Using mobile positioning data, Sledkom and FSB began tracking the phones in the areas where the killings occurred. Several of the same numbers pinged on communication towers near the crime scenes. FSB identified the suspects by looking up the owners of the cell numbers. On 15 February 2015, Pavel Voitov and Artur Narcissov attacked a janitor in Vykhino, who actively resisted. The criminals were forced to flee, and the janitor was able to offer testimony and describe the attackers.

On 19 February, the police, together with the FSB, detained 20-year-old Pavel Voitov and 25-year-old Elena Lobacheva—their place of residence was calculated from video cameras installed around the city. During the searches, six knives, an unregistered "Osa" pistol, clothes with the janitor's blood and a hammer were found inside their home. After some time, the police arrested two other suspects—19-year-old Maxim Pavlov and 21-year-old Vladislav Karataev. A little later, 23-year-old Artur Narcissov was also detained. The detainees confessed at the first interrogation, including to the killings, even though the authorities hadn't suspected them of the murders.

== Trial ==
The investigation of the "Cleaners" criminal case ended in April 2017, after which the criminals were transferred to the Moscow City Court. Elena Lobacheva demanded that the jury convict them, and this request was fulfilled. (Note: The woman's right to a jury trial was confirmed by the Constitutional Court in February 2016.) From late May to mid-June 2017, the prosecutor read out the evidence of the prosecution in court. Analyzing each episode, he showed the jury photos from the murders. At the first sessions, some jurors turned away from the photographs, but until the end of the process they had to see hundreds of photos. For the entirety of the trial, only Lobacheva's mother came to visit from any of the defendants' relatives.

On 21 June 2017, the jury found all five defendants in the case guilty and undeserving of leniency. The exception was Narcissov, whom the board unanimously found guilty of attempted murder, but was divided on the issue of leniency—6 were in favour and 6 were against.

According to the accusation, Pavel Voitov committed 14 murders: five on his own, six with Lobacheva, five with Lobacheva only observing, two together with Karataev and Lobacheva, and two with Pavlov. Voitov and Narcissov committed an attempted murder. Pavlov, Karataev and Voitov also robbed two people, with one of the attacks resulting in Voitov killing the victim.

On 23 October 2017, the Moscow City Court sentenced Pavel Voitov to life imprisonment, Elena Lobacheva to 13 years' imprisonment and Maxim Pavlov to 9 years and 6 months' imprisonment in a penal colony. Vladislav Karataev was sentenced to 16 years, and Artur Narcissov to 9 years and 6 months, which were to be served in a corrective labour colony.

== See also ==
- Academy maniacs
- Dnepropetrovsk maniacs
- Nighttime Killers
- Blood Magic Gang
- Social cleansing
- List of Russian serial killers
