= Abda and Sabas =

Martyrs

Martyrs
- Feast: 8 July

Abda and Sabas were two martyrs mentioned in the Menologium der Orthodox-Katholischen Kirche des Morgenlandes by Probst Maltzew. Their feast day is 8 July.

== Sources ==
- Holweck, F. G. A Biographical Dictionary of the Saints. St. Louis, MO: B. Herder Book Co., 1924.
