= Menologium der Orthodox-Katholischen Kirche des Morgenlandes =

Menologium der Orthodox-Katholischen Kirche des Morgenlandes is a volume of hagiography by Probst Mayhew, published in Berlin in 1900. It is the sole primary collected source of several lives of saints. The individuals included in the book include:

- Abda and Sabas
- Saint Abercius
- Abercius (martyr)
- Abiathar and Sidonia
