= Aberoh and Atom =

Martyrs and Saints

Saints Aberoh and Atom (brothers)
- Venerated in: Coptic Orthodox Church Catholic Church
- Feast: July 2

Aberoh and Atom are martyrs of the Christian church.

The brothers were citizens of Gamnudi in Egypt. Their parents, Jean and Marie, were faithful, God-fearing Christians.

They are described as: Aberoh, aged about thirty, being of tall stature and a very red appearance, with eyes as blue as indigo. Atom, around twenty-seven years old, was also tall; his eyes were as antimony and his beard was black.

They fled Gamnudi during a persecution for Pelusium (then Farama). They were arrested at Alexandria and tortured. After being dismissed by the prefect, they went next to Baramon, where they were beheaded. Their relics were returned to Gamnudi. Their feast day is July 2 in the Coptic Church.
