= Aleksandr Gurnov =

Russian TV persona (born 1957)

Aleksandr Gurnov, full name Aleksandr Borisovich Gurnov, (born 8 July 1957 in Moscow, Soviet Union) is a Russian TV persona.

He was appointed the bureau chief of the international Russian television network, Russia Today (RT), in London. He has also worked on the Russian sports channel Match TV. Gurnov was a head of the Russian television news agency TSN, on Moscow's TV-6. In 2006, he participated in an on-line interview with Russian President Vladimir Putin as a representative of the website Yandex.

Gurnov formerly presented the "Spotlight" programme on RT.

== Controversies ==
In 2018 Aleksandr Gurnov participated in an investigation by BBC Russia on the Poisoning of Sergei and Yulia Skripal. Gurnov questioned the legitimacy of information on the alleged attack, asking "[Was] there really an assassination attempt? Are they really in a London hospital? Are they really close to death?"

Despite his claims, statements have been released by Scotland Yard and The Political Quarterly to the contrary.

== Achievements ==
1. Medal "Defender of Free Russia" - for the performance of civic duty in the defense of democracy and the constitutional order on August 19–21, 1991
2. Gratitude of the President of the Russian Federation (May 8, 1996) – for active participation in the creation and development of the All-Russian State Television and Radio Broadcasting Company
