= TOTSE =

Internet forum (1989–2009)

Temple of the Screaming Electron
- Website type: Internet forum
- Dissolved: January 17th, 2009
- Owner: Jeff Hunter
- Revenue: Graphical advertisements (AdBrite)
- Website: totse.com, totse (Archive)
- Commercial: Yes
- Registration: Closed
- Launched: 1989 (dial up BBS); 1997 (UBB); 2007 (vBulletin)
- Current status: Closed as of January 17, 2009

TOTSE (/ˈtɒtsi/,) was a San Francisco Bay Area website and former BBS dedicated to storing text files on a variety of subjects and viewpoints, many of which were unusual or controversial. The name is an acronym for Temple of the Screaming Electron.

The TOTSE forum has been described as taking part in early online trolling, and compared to shock sites such as Rotten.com and Stile Project.

== History ==
TOTSE was founded by the pseudonymous Jeff Hunter and J.C. Stanton. Jeff Hunter was a founding member of NIRVANAnet, which began in 1989 as a dial-up BBS originally named "& the Temple of the Screaming Electron". The original &TOTSE specialized in small text files. Hunter had an old 8088 PC XT clone with limited hard drive space; small text files were the only data he could store in reasonable quantity. The identity of J.C. Stanton is even more obscure than that of Jeff Hunter; he is described as being an "intensely private person."

TOTSE became available on the Internet in 1997, and the dial-up BBS system was discontinued in the spring of 1998. TOTSE closed on January 17, 2009, after a goodbye message was posted on the front page of the website by Jeff, thanking the users for the last 20 years. The website was considerably popular, receiving 38,000,000 hits in February 2003; averaging more than 89,000 hits per hour.

== Text files ==
J.C. Stanton claimed that TOTSE was the largest text file repository on the internet. The text files spanned a wide range of controversial and criminal subject matter, and included numerous instruction manuals for making street drugs, particularly methamphetamine.

== Media attention ==
TOTSE has been featured in the media, usually for members committing crimes or for its controversial text files.

A 1993 article in the Contra Costa Times described TOTSE (and other NIRVANAnet BBS nodes) as "an information network providing criminal insights to anyone with a phone, personal computer and modem... offer[ing] hundreds of files providing instructions on credit card fraud, money laundering, mail fraud, counterfeiting, drug smuggling, cable-tv theft, bomb-making and murder."

Another feature was due to the "hacking" of an electronic parking lot sign in Crawley, England, designed to display the number of spaces left in each lot. The top two displays were replaced with "Fuck" and "Off", while the lower display read "totse".

The site appears on a 2006 Australian anti-terrorism poster and a television advertisement.

A number of TOTSE members placed prank calls to Live Prayer with Bill Keller starting on November 21, 2006. When another TOTSE member reported the calls' origin to Keller via email, Keller threatened legal action against TOTSE, specifically stating that the prank calls amounted to "conspiracy to obstruct commerce." The incident resulted in procedural changes to the Live Prayer show, including a three-second delay for callers.

== Community ==
The TOTSE community congregated on an Internet forum and IRC channel. Some users referred to themselves as "Totseans," and to the site as "The Temple". The community engaged in discussion about a wide variety of topics, including religion, sex, politics, poetry, humanities, weapons, explosives, drugs, illegal activities, technology, music, metaphysics, sub-culture activities, the environment, mechanics, food, and do it yourself projects.

Although Hunter had an account he rarely posted on the TOTSE forums as himself. Before its closing, Hunter stated that he conceived TOTSE as "a place where all types of ideas could be spoken, traded, and exchanged, where no topic was off-limits or forbidden" in the early days of the Internet; and, as demonstrated in the scope of TOTSE text file archive, he felt this was only a part of the community by 2009.

The forum ran on a highly modified version of Infopop Ultimate Bulletin Board 5.47a, which came under criticism by some users due to its age. Hunter later purchased a copy of vBulletin 3.12a, with the upgrade occurring on April 4, 2007.
