= Ogrish.com =

Internet shock site

- 2006 logo, reflecting a change
- Website type: Shock site
- Available in: English
- Website: www.ogrish.com
- Commercial: Yes
- Registration: Optional
- Launched: 2000
- Current status: Inactive (redirects to ItemFix.com)

Ogrish.com was a shock site that presented uncensored news coverage and multimedia material based for the most part on war and war crimes, industrial/machinery accidents, and executions.

Much of the material depicted was graphic, uncensored, gory videos and images. The content was depicted as a means to challenge the viewer, with its catch line being "can you handle life?", but later changed to "uncover reality" after the site received a major design overhaul with aims of becoming more open to the general public and become a respected "alternative news service".

From November 2006 to May 2021, Ogrish.com redirected to LiveLeak, which was registered in October 2006. LiveLeak featured mostly user submitted videos and allowed the embedding of media on other sites. LiveLeak became ItemFix in May 2021, which Ogrish.com now redirects to.

== History ==
The site hosted many graphic videos of violent events, without the permission of the families of the people shown. This has led to heated arguments concerning the rights of the people pictured and the nature of the pictures and videos on the site. For example, in 2002, graphic pictures and videos of the jumpers of the September 11, 2001 attacks were displayed on the site. The site was targeted for hacking attacks from Koreans after Ogrish uploaded the execution video of Kim Sun-il during the summer of 2004.

In August 2005, German official internet watchdog group Jugendschutz.net contacted the local branch of telecommunications company Level 3 about Ogrish, whose IP address was then blocked in Germany. Since several ISPs connect through the blocked Level 3 connection in Frankfurt, many other countries outside of Germany were also affected by this block, including the Netherlands, France, Poland, Italy and Switzerland. The Youth Protection group had found that the provider violated German legislation that requires websites to verify the age of its visitors before granting access to adult content.

In early 2006, Ogrish.com changed its design to a much faster-loading, cleaner layout. Its previous layout was very "dark" and graphic-intensive. On January 27, 2006, the "Flame/Lame/Hate" section was replaced with The Ogrish Zoo, a more politically correct version that forbade racial slurs. This change lasted barely a day, and after some consideration was finally replaced with "The Underground", a private and hidden member group accessible only at the request of an established member to an administrator. On April 21 Ogrish closed this section, finally making the transition from a "gore" website to an "uncensored news" website. In April 2006, Ogrish.com introduced a podcast service (DJed by Shawn Wasson) and added a new forum section called Underground Media—members have the choice to join this section to see more images and videos.

The website's name derives from the archaic word "ogrish" according to the site's FAQ, "ogrish" or "ogreish", i.e. "like an ogre", as defined in older dictionaries in a figurative sense; that is being like a person who is felt to be particularly cruel, brutish or hideous.

== See also ==
- Best Gore
- Goregrish.com
- LiveLeak
- Rotten.com
- Stile Project
