= Best Gore =

2008–2020 Canadian shock website

- Website type: Shock site
- Available in: English
- Owner: Mark Marek
- Revenue: Advertising and donations
- Launched: April 30, 2008; 18 years ago
- Current status: Defunct since November 15, 2020; 6 years ago

Best Gore was a Canadian shock site active from 2008 to 2020 and owned by Mark Marek, which provided highly violent real-life news, photos and videos, with authored opinion and user comments. The site received media attention in 2012, following the hosting of a video depicting the murder of Jun Lin. As a result, Marek was arrested and charged under Canada's obscenity law with corrupting public morals.

== History ==
The site was launched on April 30, 2008, by Mark Marek, and hosted explicit, real-life, photographic and video material of events such as murders, suicides, torture, open surgeries, mutilations, traffic collisions, leaked government documents, live assassinations, and CIA and FBI files.

In a 2017 interview with GQ Australia, Mark Marek insisted that running BestGore.com costs more than it generates in revenue and said, "No company with a reasonable budget would want to advertise on a website that exposes police brutality, government abuse of citizens, war profiteering and similar anti-people activities. So all I'm left with is porn. Worse yet, porn earns less today than it did five years ago".

As of November 15, 2020, the website is considered defunct as Marek, its founder and administrator, has decided to focus his attention on other interests. On November 17, 2020, when asked in the comment section on BestGore.com's lbry.tv site whether BestGore.com is down and if it will be indefinitely, Mark Marek replied, "Most likely permanently".

== Controversies and legal issues ==
=== Murder of Jun Lin ===
In June 2012, the website was criticized for the inclusion of the graphic video titled "1 Lunatic, 1 Ice Pick", which depicts the murder of Jun Lin, as well as the rape and dismemberment of his corpse, committed by Luka Magnotta. Police said that Marek had initially refused requests to remove the video from the site, while Marek said, "I took it down myself, on my own terms, without being asked. Had any such request by police to take it down, as alleged, been made, I would have just told them that the video had been down for days." Gil Zvulony, a Toronto-based lawyer specializing in Internet law, stated that the evidence supported the laying of obscenity charges against BestGore.com, stating, "There's no real crime where there's no knowledge, but once they got notice of that and they allowed it to stay on there."

Marek claimed that he would receive positive testimonies from readers and that viewing the website's content had sometimes convinced people to avoid taking risks in their everyday life including speeding, darting between traffic on motorcycle, horseplay with forklifts, and even persuaded some not to kill themselves. Marek compared his website's content to the shocking images used by the Canadian government on cigarette packaging to discourage smoking.

=== Corruption of morals charge ===
In June 2012, it was reported that the Service de police de la Ville de Montréal was investigating Bestgore.com for charges of obscenity due to the posting of "1 Lunatic, 1 Ice Pick". The Toronto Sun claimed that charges were pending against Marek, which he denied.

On July 16, 2013, Edmonton police charged Marek with one count of "corrupting morals" in connection with posting the Magnotta video. The rare charge is based on section 163 of the Canadian Criminal Code and carries a maximum sentence of two years' imprisonment. One police investigator described the site as "a racist website, inciting hate, hatred, violence—violence above and beyond anything normal". Marek was released on bail, but was re-arrested on July 26 for allegedly violating the terms of his release. In January 2016, he pleaded guilty and was given a conditional sentence of three months of house arrest followed by three months of community service.

In a November 2013 interview with Adrianne Jeffries of The Verge, Marek said that section 163(1) prohibits distribution of crime comics and methods of curing venereal disease, and noted that the law was enforced selectively and could be used indiscriminately. Marek also defended the value of viewing gory material:

You can take the publishing of the chainsaw beheading by the Syrian rebels propaganda team who claimed that this atrocity was committed by people behind president Bashal al-Assad [sic]. The video stirred major outrage in the ranks of the sheeple, but it didn't fool anyone on Best Gore, because we know where the video is really from. It's been on Best Gore since before the Syrian fraudulent revolution started and we have its full version, including the original audio and know it's from Mexico. It was the same when Best Gore busted the rebels about the publishing of the domestic gas leak explosion which they also manipulated into looking like the aftermath of alleged indiscriminate bombings by the rulers.

Or more recently, when the whole world was revving about Muslims being slaughtered by Buddhists in Burma (Myanmar)—the propaganda fooled everyone, except us on Best Gore because we recognized the lynching video from Kenya, the earthquake in Tibet and the tsunami disaster in Thailand which had been used in unrelated context.

== See also ==
- Goregrish.com
- LiveLeak
- Nowthatsfuckedup.com
- Ogrish.com
- Rotten.com
- Stile Project
