= Stile Project =

Internet shock and pornography site

- Website type: Shock/Porn
- Available in: English
- Creator: Jay Stile
- Website: StileProject.com
- Registration: Optional (to upload content)
- Launched: October 3, 1999
- Current status: Sold 2010; portal

Stile Project is a website founded by a writer and webmaster known by the pseudonym Jay Stile. Stile started the site in 1999 when he was in high school, and ran it for 12 years. Stile Project grew into a large network of counter-culture, amateur adult entertainment and current-events sites, forums, collectively called stileNET. On December 2, 2010, Stile announced that he had sold Stile Project. According to Stile, after selling the website, he went on to study computer science and received his postgraduate academic degree in 2013.

== Content ==
The Register referred to Stileproject.com as a "shock site" in a 2001 article. The website assembled "vast visual libraries of any taboo or depravity that could be digitized." In the early 2000s, as "the Web's leading repository of crude filth – probably the most reliable source of tastelessness in the history of the Internet," its content was criticized for its shock value. One example was a video showing a Korean villager killing, cooking, and eating a cat was highly publicized and denounced by PETA, who sought a federal investigation, which did not occur. Stile reportedly faked his own suicide live on webcam in 1999, and he confirmed the hoax in 2012.

Open-source software and porn were "memorialized in J. Stile's hoard of erotic Linux Slut images". As the site evolved, it survived what Stile reported was webhost troubles, and a major hacking incident. By 2004 AlterNet wrote that it and other similar shock sites "aren't grossing out teenagers anymore."

== Awards ==
Stile Project won Webby Awards in 2000 for Weird site and People's Voice winner.

== Associations ==
- Stile is a former member of the underground art scene groups ACiD, DARK and iCE. His specialty was designing ANSI logos for art group projects and bulletin board systems in the early 1990s.
- In 2006, Canadian poet Daniel Scott Tysdal cited Stile Project (December 2004) as a stanza in his poetry collection Predicting the Next Big Advertising Breakthrough Using a Potentially Dangerous Method.

== See also ==
- Best Gore
- Goregrish.com
- LiveLeak
- Ogrish.com
- Rotten.com
- Webcam model
