= NDDB =

NDDB is an initialism that may stand for:

- National Dairy Development Board, India
- Niger Delta Development Board, now the Niger Delta Development Commission

== See also ==
- NNDB, Notable Names Database, an online biographical database
