= The Aquinian =

Student newspaper at St. Thomas University in New Brunswick, Canada

- Type: Weekly Student Newspaper
- Format: Online
- Owner: Autonomous
- Publisher: The Aquinian Inc.
- Editor-in-chief: Fernanda Sanchez
- Managing editor: Emilia Alvear
- Founded: 1935; 91 years ago
- Headquarters: 51 Dineen Drive, Fredericton, New Brunswick
- Website: theaquinian.net

The Aquinian is a student-owned-and-operated publication at St. Thomas University (STU) in Fredericton, New Brunswick, Canada. The Aquinian is published on a weekly basis during the regular academic year and is a member of the Canadian University Press.

The Aquinian's mission is to "foster a sense of community at STU by developing and promoting dialogue." The Aquinian provides the campus community with an educational, informative and worthwhile presentation of STU and the greater Fredericton communities in newsprint form.

== Recent history ==
Before the 2004–05 academic year, The Aquinian was printed biweekly in broadsheet format. In the fall of 2004, the editorial staff scaled the paper down to tabloid format, which made it financially feasible to print on a weekly basis. In 2020, due to COVID-19 pandemic, The Aquinian stopped its weekly printing schedule to transition to fully digital, where staff now publish stories on a weekly basis on its website.

The Aquinian has a friendly, good-natured rivalry with The Brunswickan, the campus newspaper for the University of New Brunswick, which is also located on Fredericton's campus hill.

== Controversies ==
- 2004–05 academic year

In November 2004, The Aquinian published a photo of four University of New Brunswick (UNB) male rugby players streaking across the university's rugby pitch, after the team had just won the provincial men's rugby championship. The publication made headlines across the country, and the UNB administration subsequently suspended the four players from competing in the Maritime men's university rugby championship the following weekend, which the team went on to lose. The four players in the photo were believed to be among at least ten who partook in the bare festivities.

- 2005–06 academic year

The paper's content came under fire in the 2005–06 academic year after it published an opinion piece on student apathy towards the U.S.-led invasion of Iraq. It was accompanied by a photograph of a dead Iraqi soldier who had allegedly been run over by a tank. The image was taken from the controversial website, nowthatsfuckedup.com. The paper came under further scrutiny after publishing a questionable column on fitness ("Low Resolution") by then-arts editor Max Maxwell. In the piece, he made several incorrect assumptions about his primary subject. One apparent problem turned out to be a simile comparing the student's willpower to that of a donkey, chasing a carrot. Many misread the phrase as having described the main subject as looking like a donkey. A brief controversy arose when the student then disposed of several copies of the issue in which the piece was printed, instructed to do so by Sofia Rodriguez Gallagher, the president of the St. Thomas University Students' Union at the time. Maxwell was given the choice to either resign or be fired.

- 2012–13 academic year

The paper generated a significant amount of negative attention following articles printed with regards to the resignation of a Students' Union Vice-president. The writer of said articles had been accused of prying into the personal life of the vice-president, reporting rumours and speculation as fact and citing unprofessional sources. When asked for an apology by the Students' Representative Council, its Editor-in-Chief at the time, Liam McGuire, refused and maintained that the writer had done nothing wrong.

== Editor in Chief ==
- 2025-26: Fernanda Sanchez
- 2024–25: Oliver Pearson
- 2023–24: Giuliana Grillo de Lambarri
- 2022–23: Aaron Sousa
- 2021–22: Hannah Rudderham
- 2020–21: Diana Chávez
- 2019–20: Caitlin Dutt
- 2018–19: Sarah Morin
- 2017–18: Angela Bosse
- 2016–17: Hadeel Ibrahim
- 2015–16: Joseph Tunney
- 2014–15: MacKenzie Riley
- 2013–14: Ian Leblanc
- 2012–13: Liam McGuire
- 2011–12: Alyssa Mosher
- 2010–11: Tara Chislett
- 2009–10: Matt McCann
- 2008–09: Bailey White
- 2007–08: Nick Moore
- 2006–07: Kate Wright
- 2005–06: Justin Sadler
- 2004–05: Miriam Christensen
- 2002–04: Carmy Joseph
- 2002–02: Kyle Hanniman
- 2001–02: Andrew MacDonald

== Managing Editor ==
- 2025-26: Emilia Alvear
- 2024-25: Katherine Del Salto
- 2023–24: Peter Jewett
- 2022–23: Brooklyn Wilkins
- 2021–22: Hana Delaney
- 2020–21: Jasmine Gidney
- 2019–20: Jerry-Faye Flatt
- 2018–19: Cassidy Chisholm
- 2017–18: Sarah Betts
- 2012–13: Shane Fowler
- 2001–02: Greg Mercer

== See also ==
- List of student newspapers in Canada
- List of newspapers in Canada
