= NDB =

NDB may refer to:

== Finance ==
- National development bank, set up by a country's government to improve that country's economy
- New Development Bank, a development bank jointly operated by the BRICS nations
- NDB Bank, Sri Lankan commercial bank

== Politics/military ==
- Do not let Belgrade drown (Ne davimo Beograd), a political party in Serbia
- Nachrichtendienst des Bundes ("Federal Intelligence Service"), one of the Swiss intelligence agencies
- National Defense Battalions (Iraq) (1961–2003), Iraqi Kurdish paramilitary units
- Nuclear depth bomb, a naval weapon

== Technology ==
- NDB Cluster, a database storage engine
- Next DB, an alternate Python client library for the Google App Engine datastore
- Non-directional beacon, a fixed radio transmitter used as a navigational aid

== Other ==
- Nerima Daikon Brothers, an anime series
- Neue Deutsche Biographie, a German reference work

== See also ==
- NNDB, the Notable Names Database
