= NIRVANAnet =

- Website type: BBS network
- Founded: 1989
- Dissolved: January 17, 2009
- Revenue: Donations and graphical advertisements (AdBrite)
- Website: N/A
- Commercial: Donations accepted
- Launched: 1989 (dial up BBS); 1997 (UBB); 2007 (vBulletin)
- Current status: Closed

NIRVANAnet was a dial-up BBS network, started in 1989 in the San Francisco Bay Area, by Joe Russack (also known as Dr. Strangelove, the sysop of Just Say Yes, an early two node BBS), and Jeff Hunter (also known as Taipan Enigma, sysop of the & the Temple of the Screaming Electron), when they linked their existing systems using FidoNet protocol. Later, they were joined by Ratsnatcher (sysop of the East Bay based Rat Head Systems). NIRVANAnet was unique among BBS networks at the time because member BBS systems agreed to allow anyone to connect, and access everything on the systems, instantly and anonymously. They also traded thousands of text files between the systems covering every subject imaginable. &TOTSE continued as a website until January 17, 2009, when it was closed by Jeff Hunter.

It later expanded to include other eclectic BBSs that valued liberty and privacy, including realitycheckBBS (Poindexter Fortran), The New Dork Sublime (Count Zero Interrupt), My Dog Bit Jesus (Berkeley-Oakland, Dittany of Crete/Susan), Lies Unlimited (South San Francisco, later Salt Lake City, Mick Freen), Sea of Noise (Norwich, CT), El Observador, The Salted Slug (Santa Cruz, also Dr. Strangelove), The Lair (Boise, Idaho), Burn This Flag (San Jose, run by Zardoz), The Stage, Tomorrows Order of Magnitude (Mountain View/Palo Alto, finger_man), Tower of Destiny (Central New Hampshire), and others.

The initial NIRVANAnet core consisted of Jeff/Taipan, Joe Russack/Dr. Strangelove, Poindexter Fortran, and Dittany of Crete. Just Say Yes was one of the first nodes to close, in 1992, when Dr. Strangelove returned to school. &TOTSE closed its node function around 1998; several online "attempts to recreate an online database" were claimed to be impostors by original founding members, who are named on the trademark application (now expired). &TOTSE was—if functioning—a members-only BBS by 2000. Both node and voice functions were discontinued or changed before 1999.

realitycheckBBS is still operated by Poindexter Fortran.
