= Graphic violence =

Depiction of violence in media

Graphic violence refers to the depiction of explicit or detailed acts of violence in mass media. It may be real, simulated live action, or animated.

== Subterms ==
=== Gore ===
Gore refers to imagery or video depicting blood or an otherwise gruesome injury. On the internet, the term is used as a catch-all for footage capturing real incidents of extreme body destruction, such as mutilation, work accidents, and zoosadism. The term "medical gore" is sometimes used to refer to particularly graphic real-life medical imagery, particularly intense surgical procedures.

The term is often considered a synonym for "graphic violence", but some people or organizations distinguish between the terms "gore" and "graphic violence.” For instance, Adobe Inc. makes a distinction between "gore" and "graphic violence" on its publication service, and news outlet The Verge used similar verbiage when reporting the closure of LiveLeak, a website that often hosted and distributed gore videos before its closure.

The distribution of gore content has resulted in legal prosecution and sentencing.

=== Guro ===
Guro, also known as Ero-Guro (ero meaning erotic and guro a japanese loanword for grotesque), is a sub-genre of gore content consisting exclusively of artistic depictions of extreme injuries and mutilation, usually in a sexual or fetishistic way. Not all Guro-labeled content is pornographic, but is often used to romanticize bodily mutilation and destruction.

=== Hurtcore ===
Hurtcore, a portmanteau of the words "hardcore" and "hurt", is a name given to a particularly extreme form of child pornography, usually involving violence, bodily harm, and murder relating to child sexual abuse.

=== Graphic footage and documentary ===
Some documentary films or photos contain graphic violence, such as footage of war and crime. Unlike gore content, sharing graphic documentary and footage is legal, although the publication of such subject matter has sparked controversy.

== Media ==
Film and video game ratings for mature audiences, which are common for media featuring graphic violence

Graphic violence generally consists of any clear and uncensored depiction of various violent acts. Commonly depicted content includes murder, assault with a deadly weapon, dismemberment, accidents which result in death or severe injury, suicide, and torture. In all cases, it is the explicitness of the violence and the injury inflicted which results in it being labeled "graphic". In fictional depictions, appropriately realistic plot elements may be included to heighten the sense of realism (i.e. blood effects, prop weapons, CGI). In order to qualify for the "graphic" designation, the violence depicted must generally be of a particularly unmitigated and unshielded nature.

Graphic violence arouses strong emotions, ranging from titillation and excitement to utter revulsion and terror, depending on the mindset of the viewer and the method in which it is presented. A certain degree of graphic violence has become de rigueur in adult "action" genre, and it is presented in an amount and manner carefully deliberated to excite the emotions of the target demographic without inducing disgust or revulsion. Even more extreme and grotesque acts of graphic violence (generally revolving around mutilation) are often used in the horror genre in order to evoke intense fear and shock.

Graphic violence in media has become a highly controversial topic. Many believe that exposure to graphic violence leads to desensitization to committing acts of violence in person, leading to censorship in extreme cases and regulation in others. When worry of the impact of video game violence on youth sparked controversy in the United states, the Video Game Ratings Act was passed, leading to the creation of the US Entertainment Software Rating Board (ESRB) in 1994. The vast majority of countries now require varying degrees of approval from television, movie, and software rating boards before a work can be released to the public; however, some critics claim that watching violent media content can be cathartic, providing "acceptable outlets for anti-social impulses".

=== Film ===
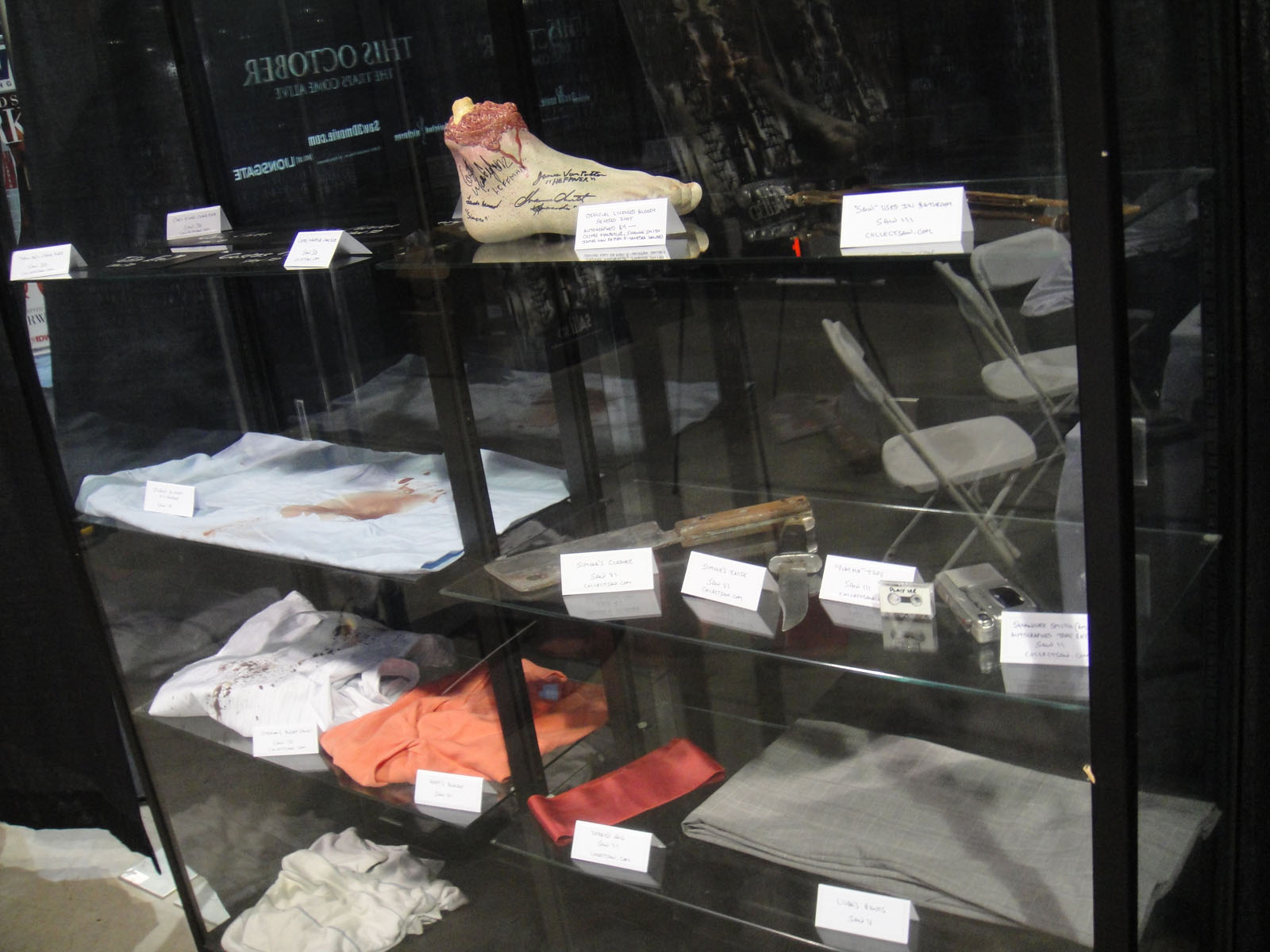
A set of props used in the production of the Saw films, which are notorious for depicting extreme graphic violence

Graphic violence is used frequently in horror, action, and crime films. Several films of this nature have been banned from certain countries for their violent content.

A recent study presented in an annual American Academy of Pediatrics conference showed that the "good guys" in superhero movies were on average more violent than the villains, potentially sending a strongly negative message to young viewers. Additionally, film scholar Diane Shoos argues in Domestic Violence in Hollywood Film (2017) that domestic and family violence in Hollywood cinema is represented almost ubiquitously as a private matter, a problem of the individual solved by personal agency, rather than an issue of the larger society that must be addressed through collective political action aimed at systemic change.

=== News media ===
News media on television and online video frequently cover violent acts. The coverage is oftentimes preceded with a warning, stating that the footage may be disturbing to some viewers.

Sometimes graphic images are censored, typically by either blurring or blocking a portion of the image, removing violent segments from an image sequence, or withdrawing certain portions of film footage from viewing.

=== Music videos ===
Graphic and gory violence has appeared in recent music videos, such as British rock vocalist Robbie Williams’ "Rock DJ,” which features self-mutilation. "Hurricane" by American rock band Thirty Seconds to Mars and "Happiness in Slavery" by American industrial rock group Nine Inch Nails also feature such imagery. The music video for "Forced Gender Reassignment" by American deathgrind band Cattle Decapitation displays such intense graphic violence that it is not hosted by many popular video hosting sites like YouTube and Dailymotion. As of 2026, it is only hosted by Vimeo.

=== Video games ===
Violent content has been a central part of video game controversies. Because violence in video games is interactive and not passive, critics such as Dave Grossman and Jack Thompson argue that violence in games hardens children to unethical acts, calling first-person shooter games "murder simulators", although no conclusive evidence has supported this belief.

=== Internet ===
Several sites dedicated to recordings of gore exist, such as Bestgore.com and Goregrish.com. Furthermore, many content-aggregator sites such as Reddit or imageboards such as 4chan and 8chan have their own subsites which are dedicated to or allow such content, although they may also require that gore material to be marked as such, often by the internet abbreviation "NSFL" ("not safe for life"). Such media often depicts footage of war, car crashes and other accidents, decapitations, suicide, terrorism, murder, or executions.

== See also ==
- Effects of violence in mass media
- Extreme cinema
- Influence of mass media
- Mobile software content rating system
- Motion picture content rating system
- Pornographic film
- Snuff film
- Splatter film
- Television content rating system
- Video game content rating system
- Violence in art
