= NameBase =

Database of names relating to intelligence community

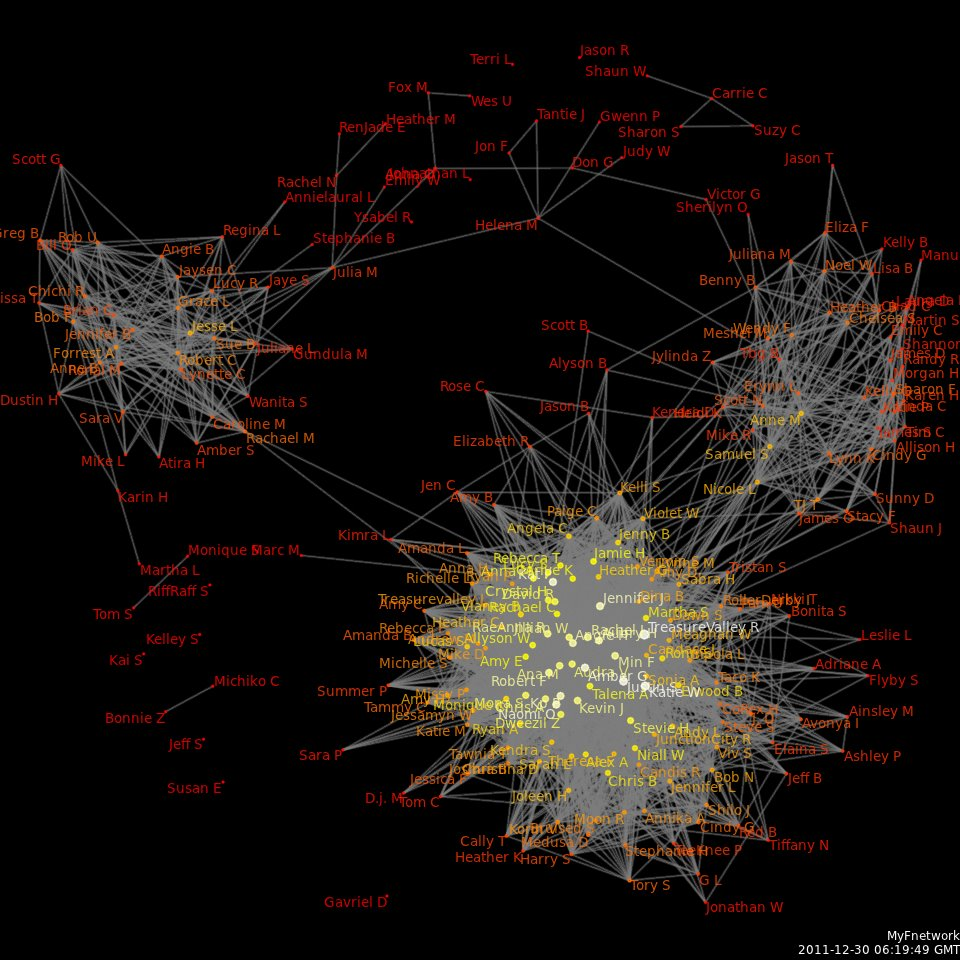
NameBase generated increasingly sophisticated social network diagrams ultimately generally similar to this one created by a third-party app in 2011 (displaying friendship ties among a set of Facebook users)

NameBase is a web-based social network database of names that focuses on individuals involved in the international intelligence community, U.S. foreign policy, crime, and business. The focus is on the post-World War II era and on left of center, conspiracy theory, and espionage activities up to 2008.

== Overview ==
Founder Daniel Brandt, who later became an Internet activist, began collecting clippings and citations pertaining to influential people and intelligence agents in the 1960s. He did so especially in the 1970s after becoming a member of Students for a Democratic Society, an organization that opposed US foreign policy. With the advent of personal computing, he developed a database which allowed subscribers to access the names of US intelligence agents.

In the 1980s, through his company Micro Associates, he sold subscriptions to this computerized database under its original name, Public Information Research Inc. (PIR). At PIR's onset, Brandt was President of the newly formed non-profit corporation, and investigative researcher Peggy Adler served as its Vice President. The material was described as "information on all sorts of spooks, military officials, political operators and other cloak-and-dagger types". He told The New York Times at the time that "many of these sources are fairly obscure so it's a very effective way to retrieve information on U.S. intelligence that no one else indexes." One research librarian calls it "a unique part of the 'Deep Web'", equally useful to investigative journalists and students.

By 1992, private citizens, news organizations, and universities were all using NameBase. With the advent of public access to the Internet and World Wide Web in the 1990s, these efforts became the basis of the NameBase website starting in 1995. As of 2003, the database contained "over 100,000 names with over 260,000 citations drawn from books and serials with a few documents obtained under the Freedom of Information Act." The website utilizes hyperlinks to allow users to both visualize relationships in a social network diagram and access diagrams and links of those who appear on it. These linkages, diagrams, and hyperlinked footnoted information allow users to uncover potential relationships or connections between individuals and groups. NameBase was described by information scientist Paul B. Kantor as being the "only web-based tool readily available for visualizing social networks of terrorism researchers."

== Similar projects ==
In the 1980s Daniel Brandt taught former CIA employee Philip Agee how to use computers and computer databases for his research. Former CIA analyst Ralph McGehee developed a similar database he called CIABASE, a website containing information on events, people, and programs concerning the CIA or American intelligence, including links to other texts available to the public.

The Notable Names Database (NNDB) is an online database and self-described "intelligence aggregator" bringing together the biographical details of over 40,000 people.

== See also ==
- Social network
- Deep web
