= LiveLeak =

Video sharing website (2006-2021)

- Website type: Video sharing
- Founded: 31 October 2006 (20 years ago)
- Dissolved: 5 May 2021 (5 years ago)
- Headquarters: London, United Kingdom
- Area served: Worldwide
- Founder: Various co-founders including Hayden Hewitt
- Website: liveleak.com (redirects to itemfix.com)
- Registration: Optional
- Current status: Inactive (defunct)

Video of the Tongo Tongo ambush in Niger (October 2017)

LiveLeak was a video sharing website. It was founded on 31 October 2006, in part by the team behind Ogrish.com, a shock site that closed on the same day. LiveLeak aimed to freely host real footage of politics, war, and other world events and to encourage citizen journalism, although it became known for hosting videos with gore and extreme violence.

LiveLeak ceased operations on 5 May 2021, and the URL now redirects to ItemFix, a safe-for-work video sharing site which was set up by members of the LiveLeak team including - but only for the set up and launch - Hayden Hewitt.

== History ==
LiveLeak first came to prominence in 2007 with the filming and leaking of the execution of Saddam Hussein, earning the site a mention from White House Press Secretary Tony Snow as the likely place to see updates or stories from active American soldiers. On 30 July 2007 the BBC programme Panorama reported on how street violence between children as young as 11 was being posted on websites including LiveLeak. Questioned by Panorama, co-founder Hayden Hewitt refused to take the videos down, saying: "Look, all this is happening, this is real life, and this is going on, and we're going to have to show it."

LiveLeak was again in the spotlight in March 2008 when it hosted the anti-Quran film Fitna, made by the Dutch politician Geert Wilders. Fitna was taken down for 48 hours as personal threats against Hewitt, the only public representative of the site, peaked. It was reposted on 30 March 2008 after arrangements for Hewitt's family and safety had been improved. The film was removed again over a copyright claim.

On 24 March 2014 LiveLeak and Ruptly announced a content partnership.

On 19 August 2014, a video depicting the beheading of American journalist James Foley was posted by Islamic State terrorists on YouTube and other sites. When it was reported on by U.S. News & World Report, YouTube and Facebook deleted all related footage and implemented bans, but demand increased for LiveLeak's footage as they permitted it. Hewitt then posted that LiveLeak's content policy had been updated to ban all beheading footage produced by the Islamic State. The website continued to host the video depicting the aftermath of Foley's execution for its historical relevance. On 30 March 2019, Australian Internet service providers blocked the websites 4chan, 8chan, Voat, Zero Hedge and LiveLeak to prevent spreading the video of the Christchurch mosque shootings in New Zealand.

At the beginning of June 2020, LiveLeak temporarily disabled users' ability to log in, and only suggested videos from other sources, such as YouTube and Dailymotion. After 14 June 2020 it became possible to log in and view LiveLeak's videos again. Those who did not log in only saw suggested videos hosted on other platforms.

On 5 May 2021, the LiveLeak website closed, with liveleak.com and ogrish.com being redirected to itemfix.com (ItemFix), a safe-for-work video sharing website.

== See also ==
- Best Gore
- Goregrish.com
- Ogrish.com
- Rotten.com
- Stile Project
