= Nowthatsfuckedup.com =

Internet shock site

nowthatsfuckedup.com was a controversial shock website depicting corpses in kill zones in Iraq and Afghanistan. It existed from February 2004 until April 2006, when it was shut down under Florida obscenity laws.

Often known by its initials NTFU, It had an initial focus on user-contributed amateur pornography until it adopted a novel business model whereby U.S. military personnel, unable to use their credit cards due to the point-of-sale being located in high-risk regions and wary of repercussions from their superiors, could gain access to the site's content in exchange for proof of military employment for free memberships. The first pictures submitted were soldiers posing with tanks and other harmless situations. As word spread of the free admittance, so-called trophy photos, or graphic depictions of corpses and other disturbing imagery direct from the kill zones in Iraq and Afghanistan began to be submitted. The site took on an idea of "bodies-for-porn."

After receiving national publicity, proprietor Christopher Wilson was arrested on 301 total charges, 300 misdemeanors and one felony, under Florida obscenity laws. Wilson hired the high-profile First Amendment law firm of Weston, Garrou, & DeWitt as well as received legal assistance from the American Civil Liberties Union and others; they eventually worked out a plea bargain with prosecutors. Under the deal, Wilson agreed to the closure of his business and not to work on any adult websites for five years, and pleaded guilty to five misdemeanor charges. The website operated for 90 more days, accepting logins from existing subscribers, before being taken over by the Polk County Sheriff.

Wilson now runs documentingreality.com, which specializes in war footage and death photos (both celebrity and non-celebrity).

== See also ==
- First Amendment to the United States Constitution
- Obscenity Prosecution Task Force
