= NNDB =

Online biographical database (2002–updated until 2022)

Notable Names Database
- Website type: Online biographical database of prominent historical and modern people
- Available in: English
- Owner: Soylent Communications
- Website: nndb.com
- Commercial: Yes
- Launched: August 7, 2002
- Current status: Online but no longer updated

The Notable Names Database (NNDB) is an online database of biographical details of over 40,000 people. Soylent Communications, a sole proprietorship that also hosted the later defunct Rotten.com, describes NNDB as an "intelligence aggregator" of noteworthy persons, highlighting their interpersonal connections. The Rotten.com domain was registered in 1996 by former Apple and Netscape software engineer Thomas E. Dell, who was also known by his internet alias, "Soylent".

== Entries ==
Each entry has an executive summary followed by a brief narrative about their life. It also lists date and cause of death if deceased. Businesspeople and government officials are listed with chronologies of their posts, positions, and board memberships.

As of 2022, the site is no longer updated. In 2026, several updates resumed.

== NNDB Mapper ==
The NNDB Mapper, a visual tool for exploring connections between people, was made available in May 2008. It required Adobe Flash 7.

== See also ==
- NameBase
