= Shock site =

Website intended to offend or disgust its viewers

A shock site is a website that is intended to be offensive or disturbing to its viewers, though it can also contain elements of humor or evoke (in some viewers) sexual arousal, or which contain hate speech and dehumanization which causes the site to target people with their social identities such as gender, race/ethnicity, sexual orientation, religion, age, skin color, disability/neurodiversity, nationality, body type, appearance, height, weight, and more. Shock-oriented websites generally contain material that is pornographic, scatological, racist, antisemitic, sexist, graphically violent, insulting, vulgar, profane, disparaging, misogynistic or of some other provocative nature of the viewer's social identity. Websites that are primarily fixated on real death and graphic violence are particularly referred to as gore sites. Some shock sites display a single picture, animation, video clip or small gallery, and are circulated via email or disguised in posts to discussion sites as a prank. Steven Jones distinguishes these sites from those that collect galleries where users search for shocking content, such as Rotten.com (which was the first shock site, from 1996 to 2012 or 2021). Gallery such as image and video sites can contain beheadings, execution, electrocution, suicide, murder, stoning, torching, police brutality, hangings, terrorism, cartel violence, drowning, vehicular accidents, war violence and criminality, rape, necrophilia, genital mutilation and other sexual crimes.

Some shock sites have also gained their own subcultures and have become internet memes on their own. Goatse.cx featured a page devoted to fan-submitted artwork and tributes to the site's hello.jpg, and a parody of the image was unwittingly shown by a BBC newscast as an alternative for the then-recently unveiled logo for the 2012 Summer Olympics. A 2007 shock video known as 2 Girls 1 Cup also quickly became an Internet phenomenon, with videos of reactions, homages, and parodies widely posted on public video sharing sites such as YouTube.

== History ==
There have been several shock galleries that have launched and shut down. Rotten.com hosted murder videos and images of deceased people, and brandished the motto "Pure Evil Since 1996". During their operation, the owners of Rotten.com launched several new sites, one of which was Shockumentary.com in 2006. Shockumentary.com was created to sell mondo films like Traces of Death (1993). Ogrish.com, which was established in 2000, hosted "mutilated corpses, car accidents, burn victims, congenital malformations and other grotesqueries". Ogrish.com's reputation rested on its publication of gore media from terrorists and war. In 2006, Ogrish.com was rebranded as Liveleak. Bestgore.com, established in 2008 by Mark Marek, was notorious for its extremely graphic content, such as photos and videos of murders, suicides and violent accidents with an estimated 15–20 million monthly visits during its operation. Marek pleaded guilty and was given a six-month conditional sentence for his role in a case where he was accused of corrupting public morals in Alberta, Canada. Some shock galleries, however, established more specific niches. In the early 2000s, the site Necrobabes hosted images of women pretending to be dead, while the sites Cannibal Café and Gourmet tailored themselves to would-be cannibals. The latter sites gained attention in 2003 when Armin Meiwes, an aspiring cannibal, used the sites to connect with Jürgen Brandes, a man who desired to be eaten. Additionally, Graham Coutts visited the aformentioned Necrobabes, alongside Rapepassion, Violentpleasure, and Hangingbitches frequently before strangling teacher Jane Longhurst.

There have also been several individual videos that received viral attention. Goatse was one of the earliest and best-known shock sites, featuring an image of a man stretching his anus with his hands. The site featured a page devoted to fan-submitted artwork and tributes to the site. The site was shut down in 2004; however, various mirror sites featuring the image still exist. In 2012, it was resurrected as an e-mail service. In 2008, the Dnepropetrovsk maniacs posted the graphic murder video 3 Guys 1 Hammer. This was followed years later by Luka Magnotta's video 1 Lunatic 1 Icepick in 2012—a video of Magnotta murdering Chinese student Jun Lin that contained dismemberment, cannibalism, and necrophilia, and was posted on Bestgore.com.Magnotta also shared a video one year prior of him using a vacuum and plastic bag to suffocate two kittens to the song "Happy Xmas (War Is Over)" by John Lennon to several gore sites. Meatspin is a shock site containing a close-up looping video (set playing to "You Spin Me Round (Like a Record)" by Dead or Alive) of anal sex, while the penis of the receiving partner swings in a circle endlessly. Although frequently reported to be gay pornography, the clip was in fact derived from a transgender pornography film. A counter keeps track of how many "spins" the viewer has watched. In 2013, a student at Florida State University hacked the wireless network of his campus and redirected all traffic to Meatspin. In 2015, consternation followed when a family restaurant played the website in front of young children. In 2016, the website was played on a public digital billboard in Sweden, resulting in international media attention. An advertising industry website documenting this incident referred to it as creating Swedish MeatSpin. The site first went live on March 10, 2005. John-Michael Bond of The Daily Dot stated that to an extent, "casual homophobia" of the 2000s helped popularize Meatspin.

== Legality ==
Currently, there is no federal or state legislation in the United States that outlaws possessing or viewing videos or images that depict the death of a human being. In 2000, a bill was introduced in the California State Legislature to outlaw these films, but after the American Civil Liberties Union (ACLU) raised protest over First Amendment concerns, the bill failed to pass. No other bill has passed since. In the case of Miller v. California, the Supreme Court of the United States established a test to determine whether content falls under the category of unprotected obscenity. The Miller test requires that content "appeals to the prurient interest" to be obscene, meaning content must have a sexual component.

That test was modified by United States v. Richards, which ruled that animal crush videos (videos that involve the killing of animals) can be obscene and therefore, are not protected by the First Amendment even though they do not clearly appeal to sexual interests. The court ruled animal crush videos to be unprotected obscenity for two reasons. First, animal crush videos can appeal to a "specific sexual fetish," which fits the sexual conduct requirement of the Miller test. Second, United States v. Richards modified the Miller test by ruling that obscenity "can also cover unusual deviant acts" even if they are not directly sexual. Child pornography also falls under the category of unprotected obscenity by these tests. Due to the combination of murder and pornography depicted on shock sites that contain murder videos like gore2gasm.com, legal scholars have argued that murder videos also appeal to specific sexual interests and are thus unprotected under United States v. Richards.

In terms of liability, unless death videos are illegal, third party providers like shock sites that host death videos are protected by the Communications Decency Act of 1996 (CDA). However, websites that require users to upload illegal content or actively encourage users to create and share illegal content can be held liable. Additionally, courts have granted increasing privacy rights to families over the publication and distribution of images of deceased relatives. The owners of Rotten.com were successfully sued by families for hosting photos of dead people and videos of their deaths on the site.

In the United Kingdom, Parliament passed the Criminal Justice and Immigration Act 2008, which included a section outlawing extreme pornography (that which is intended to sexually arouse viewers that threatens a person's life, is likely to seriously harm a person's anus, breasts, or genitals, or involves a human corpse or an animal). This has resulted in shock sites, as well as American pornographers including Max Hardcore and Extreme Associates, being convicted of obscenity in the United Kingdom.

During the Christchurch mosque shootings in New Zealand, the shooter broadcast the first shooting at Al Noor Mosque live on Facebook. The video was shared on Facebook and uploaded to YouTube shortly after. Footage of the mass murder was hosted on 4chan, 8chan, LiveLeak, Voat, Zero Hedge, and KiwiFarms. Rather than the Australian government trying to ban this specific instance of murder video, internet service providers in Australia chose to place temporary blocks on any sites that hosted the footage until all the footage was believed to be removed.

== Ethics ==
Several ethical concerns have been raised on the topic of shock sites and murder videos. One concern is that the popularity of shock sites will encourage an increase in violent murders, which can result in more extreme and violent videos that will likely generate more views on shock sites. Murder videos can inspire copycats to replicate the snuff films. After one of the Dnepropetrovsk Maniacs' videos leaked on the internet as 3 Guys 1 Hammer in 2007, Luka Magnotta murdered Lin Jun, a Chinese student, and uploaded the video (including scenes of dismemberment, cannibalism, and necrophilia) under the similar title of 1 Lunatic 1 Icepick in 2012.

Another concern is the right of a victim and the victim's family to privacy after death. This is the issue of whether Lin Jun's parents have a right to remove the video of their son's murder from the internet. Murder victims cannot consent to the footage of their deaths being used and uploaded, and several court cases have agreed that parents and loved ones should have a right to prevent the widespread viewership of a personal tragedy and stop the video from being published.

Finally, while shock value is not sufficient to justify banning content legally (as was determined by Cohen v. California), there are still ethical concerns about the emotional damages caused by the jarring nature and content of shock sites. Viewing violent content such as murder videos on social media as part of work can cause or trigger post-traumatic stress disorder (PTSD) and cause other emotional distress.

== Media ==
As more people upload and view murder videos on shock sites, some believe that this practice is being mirrored in the horror film genre. The presence of CCTV in Saw and the online torture auctions in Hostel: Part II raise questions on the nefarious use of monitoring systems and the widespread access to videos of beheadings by Al-Qaeda, executions in American prisons, and other real depictions of violence and murder on the internet. In examples like Saw, the contemporary horror genre reflects real horror on the internet.

Additionally, a parody of Goatse was shown by a BBC newscast as an alternative for the then recently unveiled logo for the 2012 Summer Olympics.

== See also ==
- Deep web
- Dark web
- Deepfake pornography
- Elsagate
- Fan service
- Hurtcore
- Internet censorship
- Internet pornography
- Internet privacy
- List of Internet phenomena
- Moral panic
- Not safe for work
- Reddit
- Rule 34
- Shock humour
- Trash stream
- Troll (slang)
- WorldStarHipHop
