= Goregrish.com =

Website offering uncensored images 2010–2023

- Website type: Shock site
- Available in: English
- Creators: User "D.O.A." and contributors
- Website: goregrish.com
- Registration: Required - (for some pages)
- Users: 400,000+ members
- Launched: 2010; 16 years ago
- Current status: Online

Goregrish.com is a shock site that contains uncensored images and videos of cadavers, accident victims, drug overdoses, suicides, murders, capital punishments, decapitations, botched surgeries, police shootings, drug cartel murder videos and war crimes. It also contains other adult content.

Videos such as murders by the Dnepropetrovsk maniacs and the murder of Jun Lin by Luka Magnotta are also freely available to view on the site.

The staff behind the Goregrish Internet forum have been interviewed over the debate surrounding the morals of allowing such material to be shown online.

In 2017, the website was named one of "The 7 goriest and most fucked up sites on the web" by Inked.

Goregrish.com was banned from Google.de search results in Germany by order of the Bundestag.

== History ==
Goregrish was established in June 2008 under another name, pwnographic.net. It changed its name and domain to Goregrish.com in 2010.

The website was believed to be an offshoot of the now defunct Uncoverreality.com shock website, which itself was an offshoot of the defunct ogrish.com shock website (later called LiveLeak.com and now redirecting to ItemFix), with many former members of both websites residing on the goregrish message boards.

=== Ngatikaura Ngati autopsy images ===
In October 2011, controversy arose when the autopsy images of Ngatikaura Ngati appeared on the site. The Children's Commissioner, Russell Wills was "appalled to learn that images of Ngatikaura Ngati have been used on [the] website."

=== 2021 data breach ===
During July 2021, the site became unreachable for a few days, and visitors were met with a 404 page. When it came back online on the 23rd July 2021, a member of staff posted a thread explaining that the down time had been due to a DDoS attack. He went on to explain that the server had been accessed by an unauthorized third party, and a dump of the site data was stolen. The announcement also gave details about a cloned website of Goregrish appearing at another domain, which members were advised not to visit due to a risk the site could be phishing for passwords. In a later reply, User D.O.A. confirmed that the hacking and cloning took place when he stated: "We have warned people a copy of this website exists, run by hackers. We don't have to provide the URL if you're on goregrish and it's not goregrish.com you know you're not on the right website".

=== 2023 outages and site going offline ===
The site had experienced numerous outages throughout 2023 that the Goregrish staff blamed on a number of issues including external hackers and denial of service attacks, complaints filed with their hosting provider over war and other graphic content and server issues. The most recent outage started in early July and persisted a number of weeks.
