= Murder of Jun Lin =

2012 murder in Montreal, Canada

Coordinates: 45°29′15″N 73°38′20″W

- Lin on an unspecified date
- Location: Montreal, Quebec, Canada
- Date: May 24 or 25, 2012
- Attack type: Murder by stabbing, dismemberment, necrophilia
- Weapon: Various
- Victims: Jun Lin, aged 33
- Perpetrator: Luka Rocco Magnotta
- Motive: Attention seeking; Sadism; Desire to reenact the film Basic Instinct
- Verdict: Guilty on all counts
- Convictions: First-degree murder, committing an indignity to a body
- Sentence: Life imprisonment with the possibility of parole after 25 years

In May 2012, Jun Lin (Chinese: 林俊; pinyin: Lín Jùn; December 30, 1978 – May 24 or 25, 2012), a Chinese university student, was fatally stabbed and dismembered in Montreal, Quebec, Canada, by Luka Rocco Magnotta, who then mailed Lin's hands and feet to elementary schools and federal political party offices. After a video that showed Magnotta mutilating Lin's corpse was posted online, Magnotta fled Canada, becoming the subject of an Interpol Red Notice and prompting an international manhunt. In June 2012, he was apprehended in Berlin.

In December 2014, after eight days of deliberations, a jury convicted Magnotta of first-degree murder. He was given a mandatory life sentence and 19 years for other charges, to be served concurrently. Magnotta was previously sought by animal rights groups for uploading videos of himself killing kittens.

== Victim ==
Jun Lin (Chinese: 林俊; pinyin: Lín Jùn), also known as Justin Lin, was born on December 30, 1978, and came from Wuhan. He had come to Canada in 2010 with the intention of starting a new life there and to study computer engineering. At the time of his death, he was registered as an international student and an undergraduate in the engineering and computer science faculty at Concordia University in Montreal, Quebec. Lin had been studying in Montreal since July 2011, previously attending Tyark College, a language school, and had worked part-time as a convenience store clerk in Pointe-Saint-Charles. He moved into an apartment in Griffintown on May 1, 2012.

Lin, who was gay, had been at some point married to a woman, though they later divorced. In Canada, he had lived for a time with another Chinese man. Lin had never revealed his sexual orientation to his family in China, even though they had met his boyfriend. Shortly before the murder, Lin's relationship with his partner had ended because Lin was experiencing pressure from his family to "settle down" and marry a woman.

After breaking up with his boyfriend, Lin had been using Grindr and other web applications to meet with men. Magnotta later said that they had met after Lin had responded to his Craigslist ad proposing sex and bondage.

== Perpetrator ==
Luka Magnotta
- Magnotta's mugshot in 2012
- Born: Eric Clinton Kirk Newman; July 24, 1982 (age 44); Scarborough, Ontario, Canada
- Other names: Vladimir Romanov; Mattia Del Santo; "Jimmy"; "Justin"; "Angel"; "Uonlywish500"; "Canadian Psycho"; "Butcher of Montréal"; Kirk Trammel
- Occupations: Escort, model, porn actor, stripper
- Height: 1.80 m (5 ft 11 in)
- Status: Imprisoned
- Convictions: First-degree murder; Committing an indignity to a body; Criminally harassing Prime Minister Stephen Harper and other members of Parliament; Mailing obscene and indecent material; Publishing obscene materials
- Penalty: Life imprisonment with the possibility of parole after 25 years

Details
- Victims: Jun Lin, aged 33
- Imprisoned at: Port-Cartier Institution, Quebec (until 2022)

Luka Rocco Magnotta (born Eric Clinton Kirk Newman) was born on July 24, 1982, in Scarborough, Toronto, Ontario, the son of Anna Yourkin and Donald Newman. He was the first of their three children. According to him, his mother was obsessed with cleanliness, would lock her children out, and once left their pet rabbits in the cold to die. His father was diagnosed with schizophrenia in 1994, after which he divorced Magnotta's mother, leading Magnotta to move in with his grandmother, Phyllis.

Magnotta attended I. E. Weldon Secondary School in Lindsay, Ontario. Later on, having been diagnosed with schizophrenia, he received a disability allowance; he supplemented that source of income by engaging in male prostitution. Besides his work as an escort, he began appearing in gay pornography films in 2003. He also worked as a stripper. He appeared as a pin-up model in a 2005 issue of Toronto's fab magazine, using the pseudonym Jimmy.

Although some media labeled him a "porn star" after the murder, further reporting showed that his work as a porn actor had been "anything but prolific or high-profile" as he had shot less than a dozen videos over a five-year period. A staff member of the Internet Adult Film Database commented, upon reviewing Magnotta's output, that "not even the porn industry was much interested in him". He did not have much success at modeling, either.

He legally changed his name from Eric Clinton Kirk Newman to Luka Rocco Magnotta on August 12, 2006. Magnotta declared bankruptcy in March 2007, owing $17,000 in various debts. The bankruptcy was fully discharged in December 2007.

=== Attempts at notoriety ===
In 2007, Magnotta was an unsuccessful competitor in OutTV's reality series COVERguy. He had multiple cosmetic surgeries, later auditioning for the Slice network television show Plastic Makes Perfect in February 2008.

Over several years, Magnotta created many profiles on various social media and internet forums to plant a variety of claims about himself. Among other things, he purported to be a successful model and a prominent porn star. Police stated that Magnotta set up at least 70 Facebook pages and 20 websites under different names. Magnotta would use these pages and multiple false online identities to "sing his own praises" (one page called him "The new James Dean"), attack people he disliked, or spread false information about himself in an effort to attract attention. Nina Arsenault, who had been Magnotta's lover in the early 2000s, described him in 2012 as a manipulative liar and often self-destructive. Magnotta planted multiple hoaxes about himself, including negative rumors, so that he could deny them as part of a campaign of cyberstalking against him.

One such rumor emerged in 2007, claiming Magnotta was in a relationship with Karla Homolka, a high-profile Canadian convicted murderer: this prompted AM 640 and the Toronto Sun to interview Magnotta, allowing him to issue denials. The Toronto Sun reporter who had met with Magnotta later said that he had found him "troubled", and that he had suspected at the time that Magnotta had made up the Homolka rumor to gain attention. However, he had assumed that Magnotta was "if anything (...) more of a danger to himself". One of Magnotta's former lovers said in 2012 that he was obsessed with becoming famous, and that he seemed to perceive Homolka and her accomplice Paul Bernardo as "role models". During the murder investigation in 2012, Montreal police announced that Magnotta and Homolka had dated, but soon retracted the statement, acknowledging that they had no evidence to corroborate the claim.

=== Early criminal activity ===
In 2005, Magnotta, who was going by his birth name at the time, was convicted of one count of impersonation and three counts of fraud (against Sears Canada, The Brick, and 2001 Audio Video): he had taken advantage of a woman with a developmental disability by convincing her to apply for credit cards and then using those cards himself to purchase over $10,000 worth of goods. He was also accused of sexually assaulting the woman, although that charge was later dropped. He pleaded guilty and received a nine-month conditional sentence with 12 months of probation. The court noted at the time that Magnotta had "significant psychiatric issues" and did not always take his medication.

In 2010, Magnotta posted on YouTube a video titled 1 boy 2 kittens, in which he deliberately suffocated two kittens in a plastic bag with a vacuum cleaner. He later published a second video of himself, this time drowning a cat in a bathtub. A third video showed him feeding a cat to a python. In January 2011, a private Facebook group identified Magnotta as the person in these videos; animal rights activist groups subsequently offered a $5,000 reward for bringing him to justice. He was initially dubbed the "Vacuum Kitten Killer" by the online animal activists. The online community that had identified Magnotta reported him to authorities, warning that after committing acts of cruelty to animals, he might pose a threat to humans. Their investigation was later chronicled in the 2019 true crime docuseries Don't F**k with Cats: Hunting an Internet Killer. In February 2011, Toronto police began investigating Magnotta in connection with the videos, after receiving a complaint from the Ontario Society for the Prevention of Cruelty to Animals. The OSPCA also contacted the Royal Society for the Prevention of Cruelty to Animals in Britain, the American FBI, and police in Montreal, due to the suspect's extensive travels.

== Murder and investigation ==
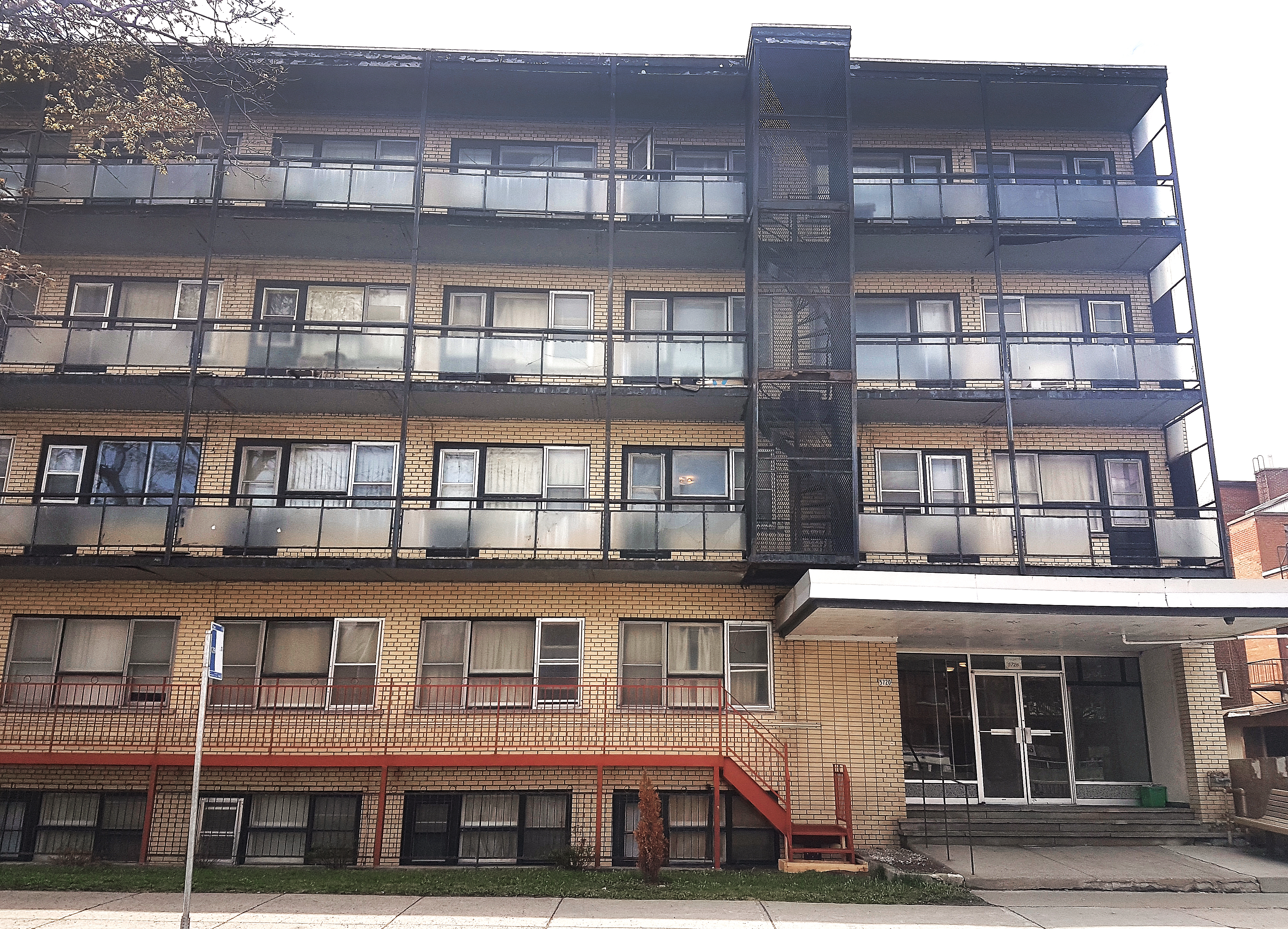
The apartment building on Décarie Boulevard where Lin was last seen alive on the night of May 24, 2012

Lin was last seen alive on May 24, 2012, when surveillance footage captured him and Magnotta entering the apartment building where Magnotta lived. Around midnight, Lin sent a text message to his former boyfriend.

On May 25, an 11-minute video titled "1 Lunatic, 1 Ice Pick" was uploaded to Best Gore. Compiled from various clips and still photos, the video depicts Lin's corpse tied to a bed frame and being stabbed by Magnotta with a kitchen knife and a screwdriver that had been painted silver to resemble an ice pick. Magnotta then dismembers Lin and uses Lin's severed arm to masturbate, before carving flesh from the corpse with a knife and fork and having a dog chew on it. Magnotta then uses a wine bottle to repeatedly sodomise the victim's corpse. Throughout the video, the New Order song "True Faith" plays in the background, and a poster for the 1942 film Casablanca is visible on the wall. According to Canadian investigators, who obtained a "more extensive" version of the video, it is possible that cannibalism was performed. The first few seconds of the video show Magnotta straddling a different man; this man had visited Magnotta's apartment at a different date and had not been murdered.

Several hours after killing Lin, Magnotta booked a round-trip ticket for a flight from Montreal to Paris, using a passport with his own name.

On May 26, a Montana attorney attempted to report the video to Toronto Police, his local Sheriff, and the Federal Bureau of Investigation, but the report was dismissed by officials. Best Gore viewers also attempted to report the video. Police later confirmed it as authentic.

On May 27, Lin's friends entered his apartment and found no sign of him, after which he was reported missing to police.

On May 29, a package containing Lin's left foot was delivered to the national headquarters of the Conservative Party of Canada. The package was stained with blood and marked with a red heart symbol. A package containing Lin's left hand was intercepted in a Canada Post processing facility, addressed to the Liberal Party.

A janitor discovered Lin's decomposing torso in a suitcase behind an apartment building in the Snowdon neighbourhood of Montreal. He first saw the suitcase on May 25, but it was not picked up due to the large amount of garbage that day. After searching the scene, police recovered human remains, bloody clothes, and papers identifying the suspect, as well as "sharp and blunt objects" from the back alley. Footage from surveillance cameras inside the building showed a suspect bringing numerous garbage bags outside, and the images matched the suspect who was captured on video at the post office in Côte-des-Neiges.

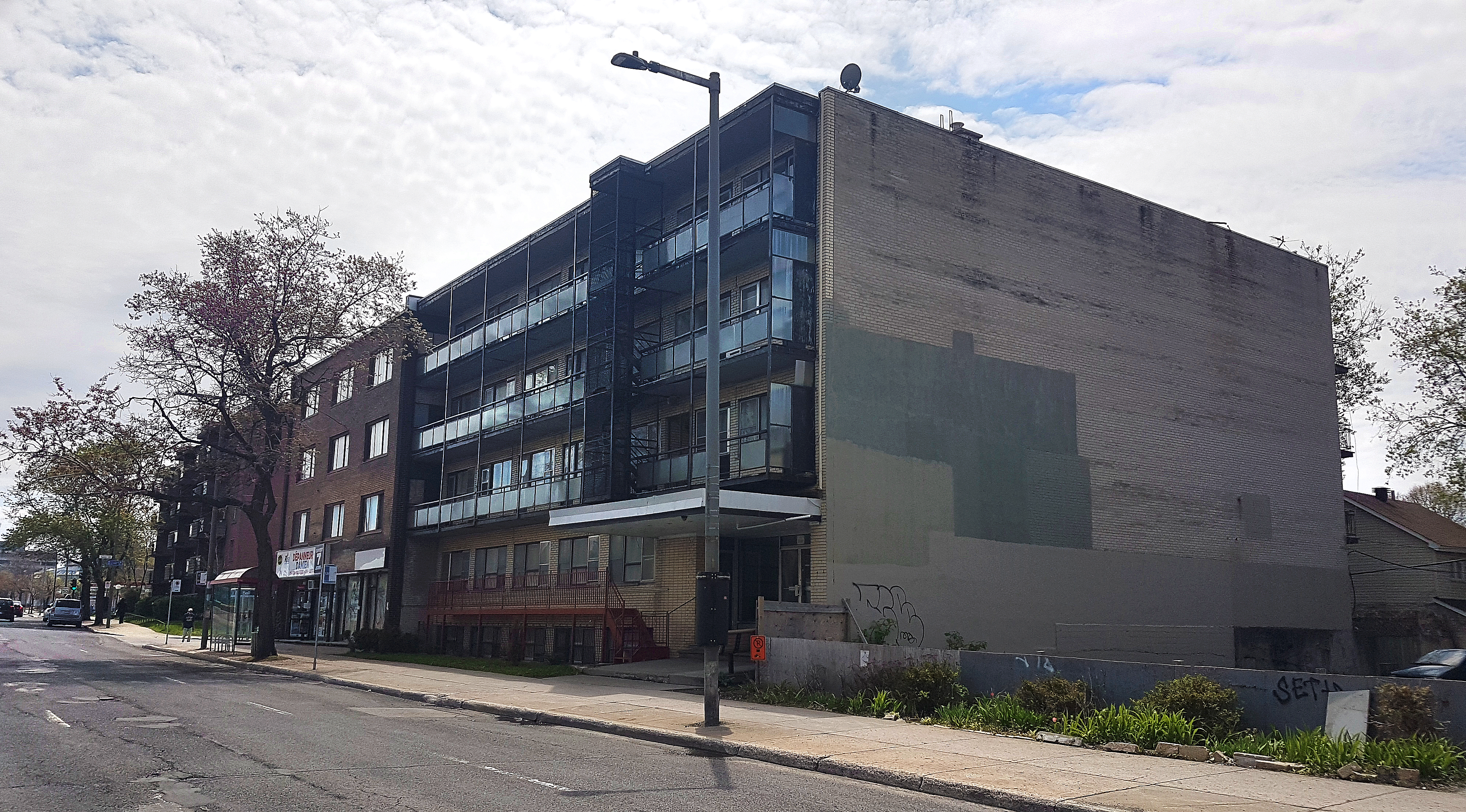
Another view of the apartment building

At 11:33 p.m. EDT (03:33 UTC), police searched the apartment Magnotta was renting on Décarie Boulevard. He had moved in four months prior, and his rent was paid up to June 1. The apartment had been mostly emptied before he left. Blood was found on different items, including the mattress, the refrigerator, the table, and the bathtub. "If you don't like the reflection. Don't look in the mirror. I don't care [sic]" was written in red ink on the inside of a closet.

On May 30, 2012, it was confirmed that the body parts belonged to the same individual, later identified as Jun Lin. The suspect in the case was quickly identified as Magnotta, who had by then fled.

A note was found with the package sent to the Conservative Party, saying six body parts had been distributed, and that the perpetrator would kill again. The other three packages also contained notes, but their contents were undisclosed by police, who cited their concerns about possible copycat crimes. On June 5, 2012, a package containing a right foot was delivered to St. George's School, and another package containing a right hand to False Creek Elementary School in Vancouver, British Columbia. It was confirmed that both packages were sent from Montreal. Some of the packages were wrapped in pink tissue paper; one of them was labeled with a note saying "Roses are red, violets are blue, the police will need dental records to identify you bitch."

On June 13, 2012, the four limbs and the torso were matched to Lin using DNA samples from his family. On July 1, Lin's head was recovered at the edge of a small lake in Montreal's Angrignon Park, after police received an anonymous tip.

== Manhunt ==
Investigations in Canada were headed by Peter Lambrinakos. An arrest warrant for Magnotta was issued by the Service de police de la Ville de Montréal (SPVM), later upgraded to a Canada-wide warrant by the Royal Canadian Mounted Police (RCMP), accusing him of the following crimes:

1. First-degree murder;
2. Committing an indignity to a dead body;
3. Publishing obscene material;
4. Mailing obscene, indecent, immoral or scurrilous material; and
5. Criminally harassing Canadian Prime Minister Stephen Harper and several (unnamed) members of Parliament.

On May 31, 2012, Interpol issued a red notice for Magnotta at the request of Canadian authorities, and for several days before and after his arrest, his name and photo were displayed prominently at the top of the home page of the Interpol website. The red notice requested that Magnotta be provisionally arrested pending extradition back to Canada by any Interpol member state.

Prior to the red notice, Magnotta booked a round-trip ticket for a flight from Montreal to Paris on May 25, using a passport with his own name. After his arrival in France, his cell phone signal was traced to a hotel in Bagnolet, but he had left by the time police arrived. Pornographic magazines and an air-sickness bag were found in the hotel room. Magnotta used a false passport with the name "Kirk Trammel" at the hotel. He had contacts in Paris from a previous visit in 2010, and police were following a large-framed man who had been in contact with Magnotta. Another man he stayed with for two nights did not realize who he was until he had left. Magnotta then boarded a Eurolines bus at the Bagnolet coach station bound for Berlin, Germany.

On June 4, 2012, Magnotta was apprehended by Berlin Police at an Internet café in the Neukölln district while reading news stories about himself. He tried giving fake names before admitting who he was. His identity was confirmed through fingerprint evidence. Magnotta appeared in a Berlin court on June 5, 2012. According to German officials, he did not oppose his extradition. There was sufficient evidence to keep him in custody until extradition, and he agreed to a simplified process.

On June 18, 2012, Magnotta was delivered to Canadian authorities in Berlin, and flown aboard a Royal Canadian Air Force CC-150 Polaris to Mirabel International Airport, north of Montreal. A military transport was reported by the government to be necessary, due to safety concerns with using a commercial flight, and potential legal difficulties if the plane were diverted to another country. He was placed into solitary confinement at the Rivière-des-Prairies detention centre.

== Immediate aftermath ==
The crime was widely reported in China, with some believing the murder was racially motivated. Some Chinese questioned public safety in Canada, as the killing was the second high-profile murder of a Chinese student there in slightly over a year. Foreign Affairs Minister John Baird called Chinese ambassador Junsai Zhang to convey his condolences.

On June 4, 2012, Canadian Prime Minister Stephen Harper said he was pleased that the suspect was arrested, and congratulated the police forces on their good work in apprehending him. Interim Liberal Party leader Bob Rae said that Canadians should mourn the victim, rather than "in any way, shape or form" celebrate Magnotta's notoriety.

Two days later, Lin's family arrived at Trudeau Airport in Montreal. The Chinese Students and Scholars Association of Concordia University established a fund to defray expenses incurred by Lin's family while in Canada, and an award was created in his honour. A candlelight vigil was held in Montreal.

Magnotta was named Canadian Newsmaker of the Year by The Canadian Press, which caused controversy.

Lin's body was cremated on July 11, and his ashes were buried on July 26 at Notre Dame des Neiges Cemetery (K04166) in Montreal.

On July 16, 2013, Edmonton police charged Best Gore owner Mark Marek with corrupting public morals, a rarely used obscenity charge, for hosting the 1 Lunatic, 1 Ice Pick video online. On January 25, 2016, Marek changed his plea to guilty, and was sentenced to a six-month conditional sentence after a joint submission from the Crown and defence. Marek had to serve half of the six-month sentence under house arrest.

== Legal proceedings ==
=== Preliminary hearing ===
On June 19, 2012, Magnotta appeared in court by video link to plead not guilty to all charges through his lawyer. On June 21, Magnotta appeared in person at a high-security Montreal courtroom to request a trial by jury.

A preliminary hearing began on March 11, 2013. The evidence presented is subject to a publication ban. Magnotta's defence team requested the media and the public be barred entirely from the hearing; this was declined the next day. Jun Lin's father, Diran Lin, travelled from China to attend the hearing. On March 13, one of Magnotta's lawyers resigned, due to a possible conflict of interest. Expert witnesses testified, including a forensic pathologist, a forensic toxicologist, a forensic odontologist, a bloodstain analyst, data recovery specialists and an Internet investigations officer. The prosecution also displayed video evidence. Both Magnotta and Diran Lin physically collapsed at separate times during the proceedings.

On April 12, 2013, Magnotta was indicted on charges of first-degree murder, offering indignities to a human body, distributing obscene materials, using the postal service to distribute obscene materials, and criminal harassment.

=== Trial ===
Magnotta elected to be tried by judge and jury. He pleaded not guilty, admitting to the acts of which he was accused but claiming diminished responsibility due to mental disorders. Crown Attorney Louis Bouthillier made his opening statement on September 29, 2014. Quebec Superior Court Justice Guy Cournoyer presided over the trial, which lasted 10 weeks. On the opening day, he instructed jurors that Magnotta "admits the acts or the conducts underlying the crime for which he is charged. Your task will be to determine whether he committed the five offences with the required state of mind for each offence."

Six tools (a pair of scissors, two knives, a screwdriver, an oscillating saw and a hammer) were recovered outside Magnotta's apartment and analysed by ballistics expert Gilbert Desjardins. He said none could be definitively linked to the killing and that no skeletal marks suggested the screwdriver or scissors were used, but some were consistent with saw and knife or X-Acto blade injuries.

During the trial, defence attorney Luc Leclair argued that Magnotta was in a psychotic state at the time of the crimes and could not be held responsible for his actions. The Crown prosecutor argued that the murder of Jun Lin was organized and premeditated and that Magnotta was "purposeful, mindful, ultra-organized and ultimately responsible for his actions".

Magnotta told a psychiatrist who interviewed him about the night he killed Lin that a person named "Manny"—who he said was an abusive client from his escort service—was there urging him to kill. It was then determined that this name and Magnotta's "Tramell" alias were inspired by Sharon Stone's fictional character Catherine Tramell and fiancé Manny Vasquez, both from the film Basic Instinct. Prosecutors also suggested that the black screwdriver used by Magnotta to stab Lin had been painted silver to resemble the ice pick used in Basic Instinct's murder scenes.

Magnotta chose not to testify during the trial.

After a 12-week trial which included 10 weeks of hearing testimony, the jury of eight women and four men received final instructions from the trial judge on December 15, 2014, and was sequestered before beginning its deliberations the next day. On their eighth day of deliberation, they returned a verdict of guilty on all charges. Magnotta was given a mandatory life sentence with eligibility for parole after 25 years. (Note: He will be eligible for day parole in June 2034 and for full parole in June 2037.) He was also sentenced to 19 years for other charges, to be served concurrently.

Magnotta filed an appeal for the convictions to be annulled and a new trial ordered. The appeal was filed with the Quebec Court of Appeal by Magnotta's defence counsel Luc Leclair, citing judicial error in jury instruction. The appeal further claimed that the "verdicts are unreasonable and unsupported by the evidence and the instructions". Magnotta withdrew his appeal on February 18, 2015.

=== Mental health ===
Trial expert testimony
| Expert | Diagnosis | Crown/Defence |
|---|---|---|
| Dr. Roy | Borderline personality disorder with histrionic traits | Independent |
| Dr. Paris | Borderline personality disorder | Crown |
| Dr. Chamberland | Antisocial personality disorder, histrionic personality disorder, narcissistic personality disorder | Crown |
| Dr. Allard | Paranoid schizophrenia (Note: While subtypes of schizophrenia (such as catatonic, disorganized, paranoid, residual, and undifferentiated) were previously specified, they have been proven to be difficult to clearly differentiate, and beginning with the DSM-5 (2013) and the ICD-11, these are no longer recognized as distinct diagnoses.) | Defence |
| Dr. Watts | Schizophrenia, histrionic personality disorder, borderline personality traits, paraphilia | Defence |
| Dr. Barth | Paranoid schizophrenia | Defence |

During his trial for murder, defence witnesses provided evidence that Luka Magnotta had been diagnosed with paranoid schizophrenia as a teenager. Defence expert Dr. Joel Watts testified that Magnotta showed signs of episodic schizophrenia (undifferentiated type), histrionic personality disorder, borderline personality traits and paraphilia not otherwise specified.

The prosecution revealed that Magnotta had been using illegal drugs during his teenage years which led to symptoms that mimicked schizophrenia and that Magnotta had been diagnosed with borderline personality disorder by Crown expert Dr. Joel Paris at Jewish General Hospital in Montreal in April 2012. Dr. Renée Roy, the forensic psychiatrist who treated Magnotta at Rivières-des-Prairies Detention Centre since November 2012, through his preliminary hearing and right up to the murder trial, diagnosed Magnotta with borderline personality disorder with histrionic features.

Dr. Gilles Chamberland, another Crown expert who was not able to interview Magnotta, suggested that Magnotta showed signs of antisocial, histrionic, and narcissistic personality disorders. He testified that Magnotta's actions at the time of the murder were best explained by histrionic personality disorder. The prosecution accused Magnotta of pretending to be schizophrenic since his defence pleaded diminished responsibility due to alleged schizophrenia, and noted that a number of psychiatrists over the years found that Magnotta displayed antisocial, borderline, histrionic, and narcissistic personality traits.

== Investigation into other possible crimes ==
On June 8, 2012, the Los Angeles Police Department announced they were in contact with Montreal police to determine if Magnotta was involved in the then-unsolved murder and decapitation of Hervey Medellin, known as the "Hollywood Sign Murder", but later announced that they did not believe he was involved in the crime. The animal rights group Last Chance for Animals claimed responsibility for posting YouTube videos linking him to the Hollywood Sign Murder in an attempt to lure Magnotta into contacting them. LCA offered a $7,500 reward for information leading to his arrest while he was on the run. On November 16, 2015, Gabriel Campos-Martinez was sentenced to 25 years to life for the murder.

Magnotta was also investigated for possible links to the 2010–2017 Toronto serial homicides, although this lead was eventually abandoned for lack of evidence.

== In media ==
The murder of Jun Lin and its subsequent trial drew comparisons across North America to Mark Twitchell, a convicted murderer inspired by Dexter, who used social media in his crimes, and to self-promote his work. Author Steve Lillebuen, who wrote a book on the case, described a new trend in crime where social media allows killers to become "online broadcasters", and have direct, instant access to a global audience they may crave.

Netflix produced a three-part documentary series on Magnotta, and the group of people on the internet who helped track him down. The show, titled Don't F**k with Cats: Hunting an Internet Killer and directed by Mark Lewis, premiered on December 18, 2019.

== See also ==
- Snuff film
- Armin Meiwes
- Killing of Nguyễn Xuân Đạt

== Bibliography ==
- Dans la peau de Luka Magnotta : histoire d'un Web-killer. Karl Zéro. ISBN 9782213672274
