= AdBrite =

American advertising media sales website

- Company type: Private
- Industry: Online advertising
- Services: Ad exchange
- Current status: Terminated

AdBrite, Inc. was an online ad exchange, based in San Francisco, California, which was founded by Philip J. Kaplan and Gidon Wise in 2002. Founded as Marketbanker.com, the site was relaunched as AdBrite in 2004 as an advertising network and then in 2008 as an ad exchange.

== Overview ==
AdBrite remained an independent ad exchange, reaching more than 160 million U.S. unique visitors each month and providing site-level transparency, display and video capabilities, and an open platform for data providers and real-time bidders. AdBrite was led by Hardeep Bindra, CEO, and Joaquin Delgado, CTO, who had worked at Yahoo! Right Media, another ad exchange. It was backed by Sequoia Capital, and DAG Ventures.

== Closing ==
In 2012, Hardeep Bindra joined AdBrite as its CEO and was tasked to sell the company or its assets. On January 28, 2013, AdBrite sent an email to all of its publishers and advertisers stating that it would cease operations as of February 1, 2013, after a deal to sell the company fell through. In addition, it laid off all 26 employees.

== Acquisition of IP Assets ==
On June 20, 2013 SiteScout announced via press release the acquisition of certain intellectual property assets developed by AdBrite in a deal whose details remain confidential.

== See also ==
- Ad serving
- Advertising network
- Website monetization
