= Rotten.com =

Shock website (1996–2012)

rotten.com
- Screenshot from March 18, 2010
- Website type: Shock site
- Available in: English
- Commercial: No
- Registration: No
- Launched: 1996
- Current status: Defunct

Rotten.com was an American photographic sharing shock site, promoting morbid curiosity and death, active from 1996 to 2012, known for hosting images of blood and gore, death and decomposition, and graphic violence. Founded in 1996, it was run by a developer known as Soylent Communications. Site updates slowed in 2009, with the final update in February 2012. The website's front page was last archived in February 2018.

== History ==
In late 1996, Soylent wrote a program that identified unregistered Internet domain names consisting of one word with a corresponding dictionary entry. "Rotten" was one of the unclaimed words, and Soylent went on to register Rotten.com in the same year. Rotten.com presented itself as a bastion of online free speech, in an era when censorship rules in some countries had begun to restrict internet access.

Rotten.com had a sparse layout; no thumbnail images were present next to links, and the links had one-line descriptions couched in morbid humor, often carrying no hints at their content. Content consisted of user-submitted images, with developers rarely posting content themselves. Though submissions were marked as "real", often they were misattributed; in one instance, a file submitted as "motorcycle.jpg" was given the description of depicting a motorbike crash, but the developers said it was probably an attempted shotgun suicide. The website's logo was a personification of death painted by Jean Colombe for a 15th-century book of hours.

Rotten.com received an alleged image of medical personnel recovering Diana, Princess of Wales' body from a car crash, though this was later confirmed as fake. However, due to wide interest in the crash, the image was posted anyway, resulting in a large traffic spike. The website was also one of the first to publish images of the September 11 jumpers from the Twin Towers, under the title "Swan Dive".

Rotten.com also hosted autopsy videos and forensic case and crime scene videos taken by coroners and forensic services worldwide. Users could submit material via email or request that developers post images or videos that were not publicly available. Rotten.com was one of the earliest adult/graphic content websites to feature pornography (both fake and real), violence, gore, decomposition, and the promotion of death and morbid curiosity.

The website has also had multiple legal threats. In March 2000, the website received a legal threat from The Coca-Cola Company because of an image on the site featuring a Coca-Cola bottle up a woman's anus. On May 17, 2000, the Pillsbury Company sent a legal threat to Soylent Communications because of an image featuring the Pillsbury Doughboy in an oven looking at a woman cooking their species.

On June 24, 2005, Alberto Gonzales, then US Attorney General, ordered the removal of the "Fuck of the Month" section along with content from several ancillary sites. In response, the site's moderator posted a removal notice criticizing supporters of both Gonzales and the George W. Bush administration for enabling censorship.

== Ancillary sites ==
=== The Daily Rotten ===
In late 1999, The Daily Rotten was started by Thomas E. Dell, which published news stories on a daily basis, focusing mostly on terrorism, murder, suicide, abuse and excrement.

=== The Gaping Maw ===
In 2000, The Gaping Maw – an editorial/commentary archive – was founded. Most of the articles were written by cartoonist Tristan Farnon under the alias "Spigot" (from Leisure Town) or by other webmasters. The pages contained news, satire, and commentary on modern society. Along with the Rotten Library, this improved Rotten.com's standing in many communities since it introduced a humane and intellectual aspect to the website. On June 22, 2005, The Gaping Maw went dark to comply with new government bookkeeping requirements regarding the distribution of pornography, specifically governmental age-verification of models, under 18 U.S.C. § 2257. All articles were taken down, and the site's title page was replaced with a statement lamenting the passage of the laws, headed by the banner, "CENSORED BY US GOVERNMENT!". In January 2006, The Gaping Maw came back online with some articles heavily edited.

=== Bonsai Kitten ===
Bonsai Kitten was a black comedy website started in December 2000 by a Massachusetts Institute of Technology graduate student. It purported to grow and sell "bonsai kittens", cats that were kept in glass bottles from early ages, causing their bones to mold to the bottle's shape. The site drew ire from animal rights and welfare organizations, and was investigated by the Federal Bureau of Investigation two months after its creation. After being dropped from eleven different servers, the site was eventually acquired by Rotten, a move that its initial creator believed generated positive publicity for both himself and Soylent.

=== Rotten Dead Pool ===
In November 2003, the Rotten Dead Pool was launched. The Dead Pool was a community game in which players picked ten people they believed would die over the course of the next 12 months. A point was awarded to a player for each of their correct picks.

=== NNDB ===
In mid-2002, Rotten.com launched NNDB, an online database. NNDB is a steadily-updated website that contained information about thousands of notable people. The news section ceased updating on January 16, 2016, and the celebrity deaths section last updated on December 31, 2021.

== Publications ==
- The I Hate Dick Cheney, John Ashcroft, Donald Rumsfeld, Condi Rice Reader. Avalon Publishing. 2004. ISBN 1-56025-620-6. (pp. 194–204 consists of the Rotten Library entry for John Ashcroft)
