= List of political self-immolations =

List of politically motivated suicides

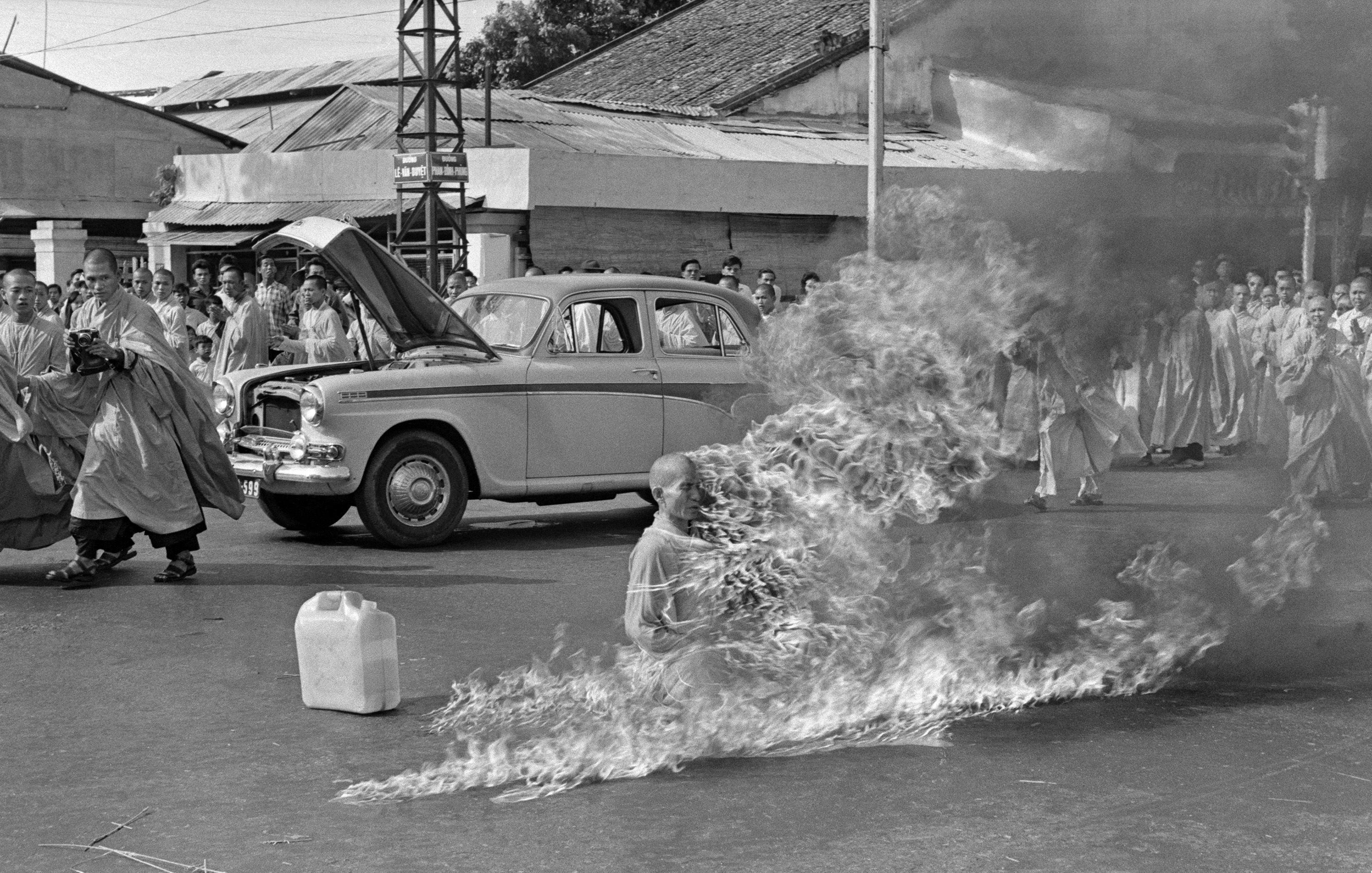
The self-immolation of Thích Quảng Đức, done in protest against the South Vietnamese government's repression of Buddhists

This is a chronological list of people who committed self-immolation, the act of setting themselves on fire, for political reasons. Non-political self-immolations are not included in the list.

== Background ==
Self-immolation is commonly understood as suicide by means of fire, although some scholars refer to the practice using the term "auto-cremation". The act of self-immolation has historical roots extending back centuries. Self-immolation was undertaken by a group of Christians around 300 A.D., who chose to burn themselves before Roman authorities could enact an execution order issued by Emperor Diocletian. Jack Downey, a professor of religious studies at the University of Rochester who specializes in the study of self-immolation as a form of protest, notes that there has long been debate over whether the act's extreme nature ultimately overshadows or detracts from the intended message of the protest itself.

== List ==
=== 1940s ===
Date	Name	Age	Country	Protesting	Notes and references
1948	Kuo-shun	–	ROC (Communist-controlled Zone)	Persecution of Buddhists and destruction of sacred objects by the government of Mao Zedong	Buddhist monk from Vietnam. In the city of Harbin, he sat in the lotus position on a pile of sawdust and soybean oil and immolated himself.

=== 1950s ===
Date	Name	Age	Country	Protesting	Notes and references
December 8, 1959	Poh Kwong	–	Thailand	Loss of money intended to build a new hospital, was possibly swindled through government corruption	Buddhist monk from China. In the city of Bangkok, he sat on a five-foot (1.5 m) pyre and attempted to immolate himself before being stopped by police.

=== 1960s ===
Date	Name	Age	Country	Protesting	Notes and references
June 11, 1963	Thích Quảng Đức	66	South Vietnam	Persecution of Buddhists by the government of Ngô Đình Diệm	Led to several other monks and nuns committing the same act. Before Diệm was toppled, the photo, photographed by Malcolm Browne, became well-associated with his political protest.
August 4, 1963	Thitch Mguyen Huong [sic]	20s	South Vietnam	Persecution of Buddhists by the government of Ngô Đình Diệm	Buddhist monk. immolated himself in the town center of Phan Thiết. Government soldiers removed his body before other monks could recover it.
August 13, 1963	Thich Thanh Tuck [sic]	17	South Vietnam	Persecution of Buddhists by the government of Ngô Đình Diệm	Buddhist novice monk.
August 15, 1963	Dieti Quang [sic]	–	South Vietnam	Persecution of Buddhists by the government of Ngô Đình Diệm	Buddhist nun. Immolated herself in the courtyard of Từ Đàm Pagoda in Huế.
August 16, 1963	Thich Tieu	71	South Vietnam	Persecution of Buddhists by the government of Ngô Đình Diệm	Buddhist monk. He soaked his robes in gasoline and immolated himself in the courtyard of Từ Đàm Pagoda in Huế. Before, he announced over the loudspeaker that he was going to commit suicide in demand for Buddhist rights. After his death (the third self-immolation in one week), the government declared martial law, sparking more Buddhist protests.
October 27, 1963	Ho Dan Van	35–45	South Vietnam	Persecution of Buddhists by the government of Ngô Đình Diệm	Buddhist monk. Dressed in civilian clothing, he was dropped off by a motorcyclist in front of a Catholic cathedral in Saigon, where he squatted in a lotus-fashion, poured gasoline in his lap and struck a match.
December 1963	unidentified female		South Vietnam	Vietnam War	Three men immolated themselves in the next week, all for personal reasons.
January 25, 1964	Kizappazuvur Chinnasamy	27	India	Imposition of Hindi over the Tamil language	Inspired 5 other self-immolations.
1965	Keeranoor Muthu	21	India	Imposition of Hindi over the Tamil language	Hotel worker
January 26, 1965	Kodambakkam Sivalingam	21	India	Imposition of Hindi over the Tamil language	Madras city government employee
January 27, 1965	Virugambakkam Aranganathan	33	India	Imposition of Hindi over the Tamil language	Worked in Madras for the Telephone Department.
February 11, 1965	Ayampalayam Veerappan	26	India	Imposition of Hindi over the Tamil language	School headmaster
February 1965	Satyamangalam Muthu	21	India	Imposition of Hindi over the Tamil language	Farmer
March 1965	Mayavaram Sarangapani	20	India	Imposition of Hindi over the Tamil language	Student
March 16, 1965	Alice Herz	82	United States	Vietnam War	Women Strike for Peace member. Immolated herself on a street corner in Detroit, Michigan.
April 20, 1965	Thich Giac Thanh		South Vietnam	Vietnam War	Buddhist monk
July 23, 1965	Huh Jik	62	South Korea	Treaty on Basic Relations between Japan and the Republic of Korea	Worked for a minor political party. Immolated himself on the steps of the Seoul Capitol.
October 12, 1965	Hiroko Hayashi	36	United States	Vietnam War	Japanese American. Immolated herself in San Diego, California. (Note: Hiroko Hayashi's name is frequently misspelled, either as Hiroko Hayaski from Zaroulis and Sullivan's Who spoke up?:American protest against the war in Vietnam, 1963-1975 and as Hiroko Hayasaki in Donaldson's "The Self Immolators". See Woman Ignites Self With Gasoline in "San Diego Evening Tribune", October 12, 1967 and Craig and Joan: Two lives for peace (1971))
November 2, 1965	Norman Morrison	31	United States	Vietnam War	Quaker from Baltimore. Committed act below Secretary of Defense Robert McNamara's Pentagon office in front of his one-year-old daughter.
November 9, 1965	Roger Allen LaPorte	22	United States	Vietnam War	Catholic Worker. Immolated himself in front of the Headquarters of the United Nations in New York City.
November 9, 1965	Celene Jankowski	24	United States	Vietnam War	Mother whose 3-month-old daughter died in October 1965. Her brother had also died in the Korean War. Immolated herself in front of her home in South Bend, Indiana. Survived.
April 7, 1966	Nikolai Didyk	26	Soviet Union	Government refusal to let him fight in the Vietnam War	Died on April 10.
May 28, 1966	Thích Nữ Thanh Quảng	55	South Vietnam	Government of Nguyễn Cao Kỳ and United States support of the regime (Buddhist Uprising)	Buddhist nun.
May 28, 1966	Ho Thi Thieu	58	South Vietnam	Government of Nguyễn Cao Kỳ and United States support of the regime (Buddhist Uprising)	Buddhist laywoman. Immolated herself in pagoda in Saigon. Thousands were present, and monks covered her body with a Buddhist flag.
May 28, 1966	Thích Nữ Vinh Ngoc	19	South Vietnam	Government of Nguyễn Cao Kỳ and United States support of the regime (Buddhist Uprising)	Buddhist nun. Immolated herself in Huế.
May 29, 1966	Name missing	–	South Vietnam	Government of Nguyễn Cao Kỳ and United States support of the regime (Buddhist Uprising)	Buddhist monk immolated himself in Da Lat.
May 31, 1966	Nguyen Thi Van	17	South Vietnam	Government of Nguyễn Cao Kỳ and United States support of the regime (Buddhist Uprising)	Buddhist laywoman. Immolated herself outside a pagoda in Huế.
May 31, 1966	Name missing	–	South Vietnam	Government of Nguyễn Cao Kỳ and United States support of the regime (Buddhist Uprising)	Buddhist
May 31, 1966	Name missing	–	South Vietnam	Government of Nguyễn Cao Kỳ and United States support of the regime (Buddhist Uprising)	Buddhist
June 4, 1966	Thích Nữ Dien Dinh	26	South Vietnam	Government of Nguyễn Cao Kỳ and United States support of the regime (Buddhist Uprising)	Buddhist nuns. Immolated themselves in the courtyard of a small pagoda in Da Nang.
June 4, 1966	Thích Nữ Bao Luan	24	South Vietnam	Government of Nguyễn Cao Kỳ and United States support of the regime (Buddhist Uprising)	Buddhist nuns. Immolated themselves in the courtyard of a small pagoda in Da Nang.
June 4, 1966	Thích Dieu Nữ Tri	–	South Vietnam	Government of Nguyễn Cao Kỳ and United States support of the regime (Buddhist Uprising)	Buddhist nuns. Immolated themselves in the courtyard of a small pagoda in Da Nang.
June 4, 1966	Name missing	–	South Vietnam	Government of Nguyễn Cao Kỳ and United States support of the regime (Buddhist Uprising)	Novice Buddhist monk. Immolated himself in Quảng Trị
June 17, 1966	Woman; name missing	–	South Vietnam	Government of Nguyễn Cao Kỳ and United States support of the regime (Buddhist Uprising)	
July 12, 1966	Liangqing	70	China	Destruction of the Famen Temple	Buddhist monk
May 16, 1967	Nhất Chi Mai	34	South Vietnam	Vietnam War	Buddhist nun
August 18, 1967	John Copping	33	United States	Vietnam War	Navy veteran.
October 3, 1967	Thích Nữ Tri	–	South Vietnam	1967 South Vietnamese presidential election	Buddhist nun
October 8, 1967	Woman; name missing	–	South Vietnam	1967 South Vietnamese presidential election	–
October 15, 1967	Florence Beaumont	55	United States	Vietnam War	
October 22, 1967	Thích Nữ Hue	–	South Vietnam	1967 South Vietnamese presidential election	Buddhist nun
November 1, 1967	Thích Nữ Thuong	–	South Vietnam	1967 South Vietnamese presidential election	Buddhist nun
November 12, 1967	Yui Chunoshin	73	Japan	Vietnam War	Esperantist
December 4, 1967	Erik Thoen	27	United States	Vietnam War	Zen Buddhist. Immolated himself in Sunnyvale, California.
December 5, 1967	Kenneth D'Elia	20	United States	Vietnam War	Immolated himself outside the United Nations headquarters in New York City, replicating Roger LaPorte's death two years earlier. Died on December 12.
February 29, 1968	Pham Van Qui	28	South Vietnam	Vietnam War	Buddhist layman immolated himself outside pagoda.
March 19, 1968	Ronald Brazee	16	United States	Vietnam War	Student. Died 5 weeks later.
April 2, 1968	Kazuo Shirakawa	17	Japan	Vietnam War	Burned self with kerosene outside the U.S. consulate in Osaka. Died 12 hours later.
September 8, 1968	Ryszard Siwiec	59	Poland	Poland's participation in Warsaw Pact invasion of Czechoslovakia	Died 4 days later.
September 14, 1968	Michaele Burrazzo	40	Italy	Unemployment	Survived.
November 5, 1968	Vasyl Makukh	40	Soviet Union	Soviet rule in Ukraine	Immolated himself on Khreshchatyk, Kyiv's main street, while shouting "Colonialism out of Ukraine!" and "Long live a free Ukraine!"
January 16, 1969	Jan Palach	20	Czechoslovakia	Warsaw Pact invasion of Czechoslovakia	Student. Inspired other self-immolations in Soviet satellite states.
January 20, 1969	Sándor Bauer	17	Hungary	Communist rule in Hungary and Warsaw Pact invasion of Czechoslovakia	Died 3 days later
January 20, 1969	Josef Hlavatý	25	Czechoslovakia	Warsaw Pact invasion of Czechoslovakia	Blue-collar worker. Immolated himself in Plzeň. Died 5 days later.
January 22, 1969	Miroslav Malinka	–	Czechoslovakia	Warsaw Pact invasion of Czechoslovakia	Blue-collar worker. Referenced Jan Palach. Immolated himself in Brno.
January 26, 1969	Jan Bereš	16	Czechoslovakia	Warsaw Pact invasion of Czechoslovakia	Apprentice. Referenced Jan Palach. Immolated himself in Cheb.
January 31, 1969	Gilbert Antonio Sanginetto	19	Italy	Warsaw Pact invasion of Czechoslovakia	Survived.
February 10, 1969	Mykola Bereslavsky	45	Soviet Union	Soviet rule in Ukraine	
February 11, 1969	unidentified male	–	Japan	Nationalism	
February 15, 1969	Lodovico Ferretti	17	Italy	Anger against capitalist system	Survived.
February 25, 1969	Jan Zajíc	19	Czechoslovakia	Communist rule in Czechoslovakia	Student
March 30, 1969	Francine Lecomte	30	France	Nigerian Civil War	Woman, apparently obsessed with Biafra, set herself on fire and died outside the Nigerian embassy in Paris.
April 2, 1969	Evžen Plocek	39	Czechoslovakia	Communist rule in Czechoslovakia	Businessman
April 9, 1969	Eliyahu Rips	20	Soviet Union	Communist rule in Czechoslovakia	Survived. Later became professor of mathematics.
April 11, 1969	Michal Lefčík	19	Czechoslovakia	Communist rule in Czechoslovakia	Soldier
April 22, 1969	James Fleming	23	United Kingdom	Communist rule in Czechoslovakia	Died in June 1969 of his injuries.
May 30, 1969	Bruce Mayrock	20	United States	Genocide against Biafra in the Nigerian Civil War	Columbia University student. Died several hours later.
June 19, 1969	Tom Adams	48	United States	Dispute with union	
July 3, 1969	Unknown male	17	West Germany	Transportation fares	Set himself on fire in Saarbrücken after more than a week of protests. Survived.
August 21, 1969	Jan Polášek	19	Czechoslovakia	Communist rule in Czechoslovakia	Survived self-immolation in Brno.
October 25, 1969	Tony Frain	29	United Kingdom	Perceived police discrimination against his family	Survived after setting himself ablaze outside Scotland Yard.

=== 1970s ===
Date	Name	Age	Country	Protesting	Notes and references
January 17, 1970	Regis –	17	France	Nigerian Civil War	Inspired many other self-immolations in France.
January 20, 1970	Robert Gerekens	18	France	"Wars and the follies of men"	Attended the same school in Lille as Regis, the previous self-immolator.
February 13, 1970	Márton Moyses	28	Romania	Communist rule in Romania	
February 20, 1970	Ottavio Zacchigna	18	Italy	Pacifism and protest against wars	Died in March 1970 of his injuries.
March 17, 1970	Leo Courtney	37	United Kingdom	Support for the Warsaw Pact invasion of Czechoslovakia	
April 10, 1970	Rafael Elizalde Mac-Clure	61	Chile	Climate crisis inaction	Writer, activist and translator who set himself on fire near the Eulogio Sánchez Airport.
May 6, 1970	Robert Rex Vice	27	United States	Vietnam War and Kent State Shootings	Non-student protester at Wabash College demonstration. Died later in hospital.
May 10, 1970	George Winne Jr.	23	United States	Vietnam War	Student at the University of California, San Diego. Died the following day.
June 4, 1970	Thích Nữ Lien Tap	24	South Vietnam	Vietnam War	Buddhist nun
August 15, 1970	Thich Thien Nhu	21	South Vietnam	Vietnam War	Buddhist monk.
September 19, 1970	Kostas Georgakis	22	Greece	Military rule in Greece	Student at the University of Genoa
September 19, 1970	Joseba Elosegi	54	Spain	Bombing of Guernica in 1937. Independence of the Basque Country.	Survived
October 2, 1970	unidentified male	–	France	Communist rule in Czechoslovakia	
November 13, 1970	Jeon Tae-il	22	South Korea	Labor conditions and the government's opposition to reform	
March 19, 1971	Edmondo Unterhausen	18	Italy	Vietnam War	
May 4, 1971	Adil Kartal	25	Turkey	Protest against government	
May 1971	Nguyen Thi Co	–	South Vietnam	Vietnam War	Buddhist nuns
May 1971	Thích Nữ Tinh Nhuan	–	South Vietnam	Vietnam War	Buddhist nuns
August 16, 1971	Man; name missing	–	South Vietnam	Vietnam War	Vietnam War veterans
August 16, 1971	Nguyen Minh Dang	37	South Vietnam	Vietnam War	Vietnam War veterans
October 1971	Thích Nữ Tinh Cuong	–	South Vietnam	Vietnam War	Buddhist nun
October 4, 1971	Olive Parry	66	United Kingdom	Vivisection	Self-immolated on the feast day of Francis of Assisi, the patron saint of animals.
1972	Thích Nữ Dien Han	–	South Vietnam	Vietnam War	Buddhist nun
May 14, 1972	Romas Kalanta	19	Soviet Union	Communist rule in Lithuania	Inspired largest post-war riots in occupied Lithuania and the USSR and 13 other self-immolations
May 29, 1972	V. Stonys	24	Soviet Union	Communist rule in Lithuania	Immolated himself in Varėna.
June 6, 1972	Huguette Gaulin	28	Canada		French Canadian novelist who publicly immolated herself in Montreal while screaming "You have destroyed the beauty of the world!"
September 27, 1972	unidentified male	37	Denmark	Protest against European Common Market and his unemployment	Survived with extensive second-degree burns.
September 30, 1972	Józef Dolak	26 or 27	Poland	Protest against Communist rule in Poland	Probably followed the example of Jan Palach
October 7, 1972	Willie B. Phillips	27	United States	Racism against African-Americans	Immolated himself at Atlanta parade. Died in hospital.
1974	Thích Nữ Du Dieu	–	South Vietnam	Vietnam War	Buddhist nun
August 15, 1974	Phan Van Lua	33	South Vietnam	Anti-Communism	Vietnam War veteran discharged with wounds. Immolated himself in front of the National Assembly. Died at scene.
August 10, 1976	Antanas Kalinauskas	19	Soviet Union	Communist rule in Lithuania	In Soviet Army barracks in Gulbene, Latvia. Died the following day.
August 22, 1976	Oskar Brüsewitz	47	East Germany	Communist repression of religion in East Germany	Lutheran pastor
February 10, 1977	Alain Escoffier	27	France	Communism	Member of the Party of New Forces, a neo-fascist political party.
September 1, 1977	Leopoldo Aragon		Sweden	Protest against Torrijos–Carter Treaties	A Panamanian national immolated himself in front of the U.S. embassy in Stockholm.
November 16, 1977	Hartmut Gründler	37	West Germany	Atomic policy	
January 21, 1978	Oleksa Mykolajovyč Hirnyk	65	Soviet Union	Communist rule in Ukraine	Set himself on fire near the grave of Taras Shevchenko in Kaniv after spreading leaflets condemning Russification of Ukraine.
February 8, 1978	Erika Ruppert	24	West Germany	Political protest	Ruppert and Kleinknecht wrote a letter a day before their act in which they explained the reasoning behind their decision, and their affiliation with Ananda Marga. The next morning, they doused themselves with gasoline and Immolated themselves at the Kaiser Wilhelm Memorial Church in Berlin.
February 8, 1978	Helmut Kleinknecht	28	West Germany	Political protest	Ruppert and Kleinknecht wrote a letter a day before their act in which they explained the reasoning behind their decision, and their affiliation with Ananda Marga. The next morning, they doused themselves with gasoline and Immolated themselves at the Kaiser Wilhelm Memorial Church in Berlin.
May 4, 1978	Andre Kilchinski	41	Israel	Protest against Nazism	Occurred on Holocaust Day. Rescued with slight burns.
June 14, 1978	Elizabeth Weniger	25	Philippines	Political protest	Swiss-born Elizabeth Weniger immolated herself at Rizal Park in Manila after distributing leaflets explaining her reasons.
June 23, 1978	Musa Mamut	46	Soviet Union	Discrimination against Crimean Tatars in the Soviet residence permission system, which prohibited nearly all Crimean Tatars who were deported in 1944 from returning to their place of birth	Mamut was born and raised Crimea until the NKVD deported all Crimean Tatars to Central Asia in May 1944. He returned to Crimea in 1975 and was later arrested and charged for not having a residence permit to live there, despite being born in the peninsula; the residence permit system was designed to prevent exiled Crimean Tatars from returning to their homeland. Then police came to arrest him on 23 June 1978 Mamut immolated himself rather than being deported again and died 5 days later.
September 17, 1978	Rolf Günther	41	East Germany	Probably protest against repression of religion in East Germany, maybe also internal church conflicts	Set himself on fire in front of 300 people after revealing a banner that read "finally wake up!"
October 3, 1978	Lynette Phillips	24	Switzerland	Social protest	Lynette Phillips had previously planned to self-immolate outside the British Houses of Parliament in London, but upon receiving word of this, British authorities deported her. She changed her plan and decided to self-immolate outside the United Nations headquarters in Geneva, Switzerland. She protested against "inhumanity, injustice and irrationality prevalent in our society". She died at the scene.
December 28, 1978	Chiao Shaoying	40	Taiwan	Against US-Taiwan decoupling	Taken to hospital in poor condition.

=== 1980s ===
Date	Name	Age	Country	Protesting	Notes and references
March 21, 1980	Walenty Badylak	76	Poland	Katyn massacre	Home Army veteran immolated himself chained to a well in the Main Square, Kraków.
March 21, 1981	Per-Axel Arosenius	60	Sweden	Taxes	
March 21, 1982	Mazlum Doğan	27	Turkey	Detention conditions in Prison	Member of the Kurdistan Workers' Party protesting the detention conditions in the Diyarbakır prison after the coup d'état in 1980.
May 18, 1982	Mahmut Zengin; Ferhat Kurtay; Eşref Anyık; Necmi Öner		Turkey	Detention conditions in Prison	Two months after Mazlum Doğan's self-immolation in the same prison. The four were members of the Kurdistan Workers' Party protesting the detention conditions in the Diyarbakır prison after the coup d'état in 1980.
May 26, 1982	Semra Ertan	25	West Germany	Racism towards Turkish workers in Germany	An Alevit Turkish-German poet.
August 10, 1982	Artin Penik	61	Turkey	ASALA attack at Esenboğa International Airport	Set himself on fire in Taksim Square.
March 5, 1983	Cecil Andrews	37	United States	Unemployment	Was listed in serious condition. His self-immolation was filmed by a television crew.
November 2, 1983	Sebastián Acevedo	50	Chile	Kidnapping of his children by the Chilean police during the dictatorship of Augusto Pinochet	After 2 days of searching for his children, Acevedo immolated himself in front of the Cathedral of the Most Holy Conception.
July 10, 1984	Ruth Christenson	23	United States	Pornography	Survived. Committed suicide by setting her apartment on fire in 1990.
February 2, 1985	Mehmed Karahyuseinov	40	Bulgaria	Treatment of Turks in Bulgaria	Immolated himself after Bulgarian government tried to change his name. Survived heavily wounded, died 5 years later.
March 27, 1985	Unidentified man	50s	South Korea	Protest against government's decision to return Chinese sailors	Survived with minor injuries.
April 10, 1985	Marcel Claire	69	France	Government's interference in his company	
February 14, 1986	Orland Payne McCafferty	58	United States	Ronald Reagan's policies	Set himself on fire outside the White House. Died a month later.
February 25, 1986	Marko Djukic	63	Canada	Trial to deport Andrija Artuković	Croatian/Canadian immolated himself on University Ave. in Toronto across from US Consulate. Survived for many years afterwards.
May 3, 1986	Kim Se-jin	21	South Korea	US military presence in South Korea.	
May 26, 1986	Lee Jae-ho		South Korea		Classmate of Kim Se-jin.
March 6, 1987	Pyo Jung-doo	25	South Korea	Opposition to government (see: June Democratic Struggle)	Survived with critical injuries after self-immolating outside American embassy in Seoul.
April 27, 1987	Unidentified woman	60	Romania	Government's refusal to let her travel to West Germany	Immolated herself outside West German embassy in Bucharest.
August 31, 1987	Antoine Thurel	56	United States	Religious persecution in Haiti	Cab driver from Haiti. Immolated himself in front of Statehouse in Boston. Died at the scene.
September 20, 1987	Neusha Farrahi	31	United States	Protest against the Khomeini government	Immolated himself at a protest of around 1,000 people against the Iranian government. Died on October 2.
September 10, 1988	Mehrdad Imen	32	United States	Protest against the executions of political prisoners committed by the Khomeini government as well as human rights abuses in Iran	Los Angeles resident originally from Iran. Flew from LA to NYC. Participated in a protest and immolated himself in front of the UN shortly after protest ended. Died the next day.
March 2, 1989	Liviu Cornel Babeș	47	Romania	Communist rule in Romania	Immolated himself on ski slope. Died 2 hours later.
March 2, 1989	Vytautas Vičiulis	37	Soviet Union	Communist rule in Lithuania	
March 24, 1989	Kailash Pawar		India	To draw attention to plight of Bhopal gas victims and protest public indifference	Original story published in The Hindu, March 26, 1990.
April 7, 1989	Cheng Nan-jung	41	Taiwan	For freedom of speech and Taiwan independence	
May 19, 1989	Chan I-hua	32	Taiwan	During funeral procession of Cheng Nan-jung.	
May 23, 1989	Karl Koch	23	West Germany	unknown	Controversial whether death by suicide or murder
October 24, 1989	Shavkat Yarullin	40	Soviet Union	In protest of exile and mistreatment of Crimean Tatars by the government	Immolated himself in front of a government building. Died several hours later.
December 14, 1989	Seidamet Balji		Soviet Union	In protest of exile and mistreatment of Crimean Tatars by the government	While being forced to leave Yalta he doused himself with gasoline and immolated himself. Survived after being extinguished, but said he would do it again if he had to live in exile for longer.

=== 1990s ===
Date	Name	Age	Country	Protesting	Notes and references
March 21, 1990	Zekiye Alkan		Turkey	Ban of Newroz celebrations	Medical student who immolated himself on Newroz.
April 26, 1990	Stanislovas Žemaitis	52	Soviet Union	Communist rule in Lithuania	Protesting Soviet economic blockade of Lithuania. Died the following day in Moscow hospital.
May 9, 1990	Rimantas Daugintis	55	Soviet Union	Communist rule in Lithuania	Lithuanian sculptor immolated himself on Hungarian–Soviet border. Died a few days later.
June 21, 1990	unidentified male	32	Bulgaria	Alleged election fraud	Initially survived.
September 19, 1990	Rajiv Goswami	19	India	Reservation in India	Survived
October 14, 1990	Thanawut Klingchuea	20	Thailand	Government of Chatichai Choonhavan	Ramkhamhaeng University student
November 11, 1990	Stephen Hill	29	United Kingdom	Peace and anti-war protest	Survived self-immolation during a Remembrance Sunday ceremony at the Cenotaph.
November 19, 1990	Nguyen Kim Bang	56	United States	Conditions in Vietnam	Self-immolated in front of the U.S. Capitol.
December 9, 1990	Timothy Brown	48	United States	Gulf War	Self-described Vietnam War veteran set himself on fire at an abandoned cannery.
January 10, 1991	Richard Breeze	38	United States	Gulf War	Took place after an anti-war rally.
February 18, 1991	Gregory Levey	30	United States	Gulf War	Took place in Amherst Common, Massachusetts.
April 29, 1991	Park Seung-hee	20	South Korea	Political situation in South Korea	Immolated herself after student demonstrator Kang Kyung-dae was beaten to death by police. She was buried at the May 18th National Cemetery.
September 21, 1991	Giorgi Abesadze	35	Georgia	Looming civil war in Georgia	Physician
March 21, 1992	Rahşan Demirel		Turkey	Treatment of Kurds by Turkey	She immolated herself on Newroz.
April 6, 1993	Binh Gia Pham	43	United States	Persecution of Buddhists in Vietnam	Binh Gia Pham had five friends tape his self-immolation outside Boston. Died at the scene.
April 29, 1993	Graham Bamford	48	United Kingdom	War in Bosnia and Herzegovina	'The British army must not be a guard of honour at a mass funeral. Bosnian babies, children, and womenfolk are waiting for the politicians to do what they know they should – give them military protection.'
January 27, 1994	Son Ha Hoang	27	Germany	Imminent deportation	Originally from Vietnam, he sought asylum in Germany.
February 21, 1994	Homa Darabi	54	Iran	Legal obligation under the Islamic Criminal Code (Art. 139) for women to wear the headscarf in public	Pediatrician, political activist. Died the following day
March 21, 1994	Nilgün Yıldırım and Bedriye Taş		Germany	Repression of Kurdish identity and traditions	They immolated themselves on Newroz, an important festivity for the Kurds
September 22, 1994	Ulrich Baer		Germany	Pollution	Baer, an environmental official, immolated himself on a trash heap.
March 9, 1995	unidentified male		United States	"Genocide and human rights violations" in Poland; planned deportation to Poland	Immolated himself in an International Red Cross office.
April 25, 1995	Reinhold Elstner	75	Germany	"Slander and demonization" of German soldiers after World War II	Wehrmacht veteran. Died in a Munich hospital 12 hours later.
September 3, 1995	Sabine Kratze	25	Vietnam	Trial of six Buddhist monks	
December 15, 1995	Abdul Raoob	23	India	Killing of the Sri Lankan Tamils	Immolated himself in Trichy, Tamil Nadu over the Killings of Sri Lankan Tamils committed by the Sinhalese-dominated Sri Lanka government and to Protest against India playing the Sri Lanka Cricket team in Chennai.
October 22, 1996	Kathy Change	46	United States	For directly democratic community-based self-government	
January 7, 1998	unknown male	24	Germany	Imminent deportation	A Kurdish man who set himself on fire in Wessel, Germany. He sought asylum there.
January 13, 1998	Alfredo Ormando	39	Italy	Catholic Church's condemnation of homosexuality	
April 27, 1998	Thupten Ngodup	60	India	Political situation in Tibet	Ex-monk. In protest of police interference with unto-death hunger-strike in Delhi. Died 2 days later in hospital after visit by the Dalai Lama.
June 17, 1998	Gilles Blanchard	43	France	Political situation in Tibet	
February 16, 1999	Necla Coşkun	14	United Kingdom	Arrest of Abdullah Öcalan	Survived
February 1999	Zülkuf Yilmaz		Switzerland	Arrest of Abdullah Öcalan	Survived
October 28, 1999	Tommaso Luzzi		Italy	Demolition of homes in La Storta, Rome	National Alliance councilor. Survived.

=== 2000s ===
Date	Name	Age	Country	Protesting	Notes and references
January 23, 2001	various	–	China	See Tiananmen Square self-immolation incident	
April 2, 2001	Shahraz Kayani	48	Australia	Government refusal to grant entry to his wife and daughters	Pakistani refugee
December 1, 2001	Eduardo Miño	50	Chile	Pizarreño asbestos disaster	
November 15, 2002	Milos Redzepovic	34	Germany	Planned deportation of his family to Serbia	Doused himself in gasoline and immolated himself inside the town hall of Syke. Died the following day.
March 6, 2003	Zdeněk Adamec	19	Czech Republic	Iraq War	Immolated himself in Prague. Died at the scene.
December 24, 2003	Thich Chan Hy	74	United States	Religious freedom in Vietnam	Self-immolated at a pagoda in Charlotte, North Carolina.
July 21, 2004	Mordehai (Hamimo) Cohen	30	Israel	Rejection of work license	Immolated himself during a City Hall assembly.
October 5, 2004	Maggy Mufu Delvaux	44	Luxembourg	Protest against institutionalized racism	Immolated herself in a public place Money problems resulting from the Luxembourgish government denying her family the authorisation to open a garage despite meeting all the legal requirements and suing the State for discrimination have driven the woman to desperately plead her case publicly after writing an open letter to the Prime Minister warning him of what she was about to do. However no help was sent to her to prevent her immolation.
August 17, 2005	Yelena Businov	54	Israel	Protest against the Israeli disengagement from Gaza	
August 31, 2005	Baruch Ben Menahem	21	Israel	Protest against the Israeli disengagement from Gaza	
March 28, 2006	Eleftheria Fourtoulaki		Greece	Treatment of Kurds in Turkey	
June 11, 2006	Pravin Joshi	30	India	Screening of Fanaa	Died 9 days later.
October 31, 2006	Roland Weisselberg	73	Germany	Spread of Islam	Former Lutheran pastor immolated himself in a former monastery in Erfurt. Died the following day.
November 3, 2006	Malachi Ritscher	52	United States	War in Iraq	Died at the scene.
November 23, 2006	Lhakpa Tsering	23	India	Political situation in Tibet	Survived
March 7, 2007	Uddhav Bhandari	40	United Kingdom	Asylum policy	Nepali asylum seeker
April 1, 2007	Heo Se-uk	54	South Korea	South Korea – United States Free Trade Agreement	
April 2, 2008	Liao Shuhsin	44	Taiwan	Freedom of speech	
October 1, 2008	Ramiro Guillén Tapia	65	Mexico	Protest against the dispossession and destruction of lands by the local government in the city of Xalapa	Immolated himself after being informed that the governor had canceled discussions to end the agrarian conflict.
November 11, 2008	Liu Poyen	80	Taiwan	Against Chen Yunlin's visit to Taiwan and the reaction of the government	Died on December 14, 2008. A part of the Wild Strawberries Movement.
January 29, 2009	Kumar Muthukumar	26	India	Killing of the Sri Lankan Tamils	Inspired several other self-immolations
February 12, 2009	Murugathasan Varnakulasingham	26	Switzerland	Killing of the Sri Lankan Tamils	Inspired several other self-immolations
February 27, 2009	Tapey	mid-20s	China	Political situation in Tibet	Monk, Kirti Monastery, Ngaba. Shot by Chinese police while on fire, and then taken away by them. Current status unknown.
November 13, 2009	Tang Fu-zhen	47	China	Forced demolition of her home	Died 16 days later.
December 3, 2009	Kasoju Srikanth Chary	24	India	For statehood of Telangana	Died the following day.

=== 2010s ===
Date	Name	Age	Country	Protesting	Notes and references
February 20, 2010	Siripur Yadaiah	19	India	For statehood of Telangana	Student. Immolated himself at the main gate of Osmania University, Hyderabad. Died the next day in hospital.
July 31, 2010	Eshan Reddy	20s	India	For statehood of Telangana	Student. Immolated himself as an offering for a deity for the cause of statehood.
September 10, 2010	Ye Zhongcheng	79	China	Forced demolition of their home	Zhongcheng immolated himself with two family members and died on September 18.
December 17, 2010	Tarek el-Tayeb Mohamed Bouazizi	26	Tunisia	Corruption in government	Inspired the Tunisian revolution leading to ouster of President Ben Ali and further revolutions of the Arab Spring. Survived until he died on January 4, 2011.
January 7, 2011	Hosni Kalaya	40	Tunisia	Corruption in government	Inspired by Bouazizi's self-immolation. Survived.
January 16, 2011	Venugopala Reddy	20s	India	For statehood of Telangana	MCA student immolated himself near his university auditorium, died on the spot.
January 16, 2011	Mohsen Bouterfif	–	Algeria	Unemployment and housing	Inspired by Bouazizi's self-immolation in Tunisia.
January 16, 2011	Bhavani	18	India	For statehood of Telangana	
January 17, 2011	Yacoub Ould Dahoud	43	Mauritania	Political situation in Mauritania	
January 23, 2011	Unnamed man	60s	Saudi Arabia	Political situation in Saudi Arabia	
February 21, 2011	Mustafa	40	India	For statehood of Telangana	
March 16, 2011	Rigzin Phuntsog	21	China	Political situation in Tibet	Monk of Kirti Monastery. In Ngaba, Amdo. Beaten by police before they extinguished the flames. Died in hospital.
June 15, 2011	Thomas James Ball	58	United States	Father's rights and family court injustice	Immolated himself on the steps of a family courthouse in New Hampshire. Died on the spot.
June 30, 2011	Aidar Saparov		Kazakhstan	Negligence by police, social injustice	As protest to the unsolved murder of his nephew and negligence of the Police regarding the case, immolated himself in the Alga, Aktobe Region Prosecutor General's office, ran outside the building. Bystanders took out the fire, and Saparov was rushed to the hospital. He survived.
August 15, 2011	Tsewang Norbu	29	China	Political situation in Tibet	Monk of Nyitso monastery in Kham Tawu. Died soon afterwards.
August 28, 2011	Senkodi	27	India	Convictions in the Assassination of Rajiv Gandhi case	A Tamil woman immolated herself in front of a tahsil office at Kanchipuram to protest death sentences of A. G. Perarivalan, V. Sriharan (alias Murugan), and T. Suthendraraja (alias Santhan). She died the same day.
September 16, 2011	Apostolos Polyzonis	55	Greece	European sovereign-debt crisis	Immolated himself in front of a bank in Thessaloniki.
September 23, 2011	Andrzej Żydek	49	Poland	Opposition to the Civic Platform government	Occurred in front of the Chancellery of the Prime Minister of Poland. A letter to Donald Tusk was found attached to a bench in the park.
September 26, 2011	Lobsang Kelsang	18	China	Political situation in Tibet	Monks from Kirti Monastery in Ngaba. Immolated themselves on the streets of Ngaba. Both survived, but Lobsang Kunchok had his leg amputated and both were imprisoned for 6 years.
September 26, 2011	Lobsang Kunchok	18	China	Political situation in Tibet	Monks from Kirti Monastery in Ngaba. Immolated themselves on the streets of Ngaba. Both survived, but Lobsang Kunchok had his leg amputated and both were imprisoned for 6 years.
October 3, 2011	Kelsang Wangchuk	17	China	Political situation in Tibet	Monk from Kirti Monastery in Ngaba. Immolated himself on the streets of Ngaba. Status unknown.
October 7, 2011	Khaying	18	China	Political situation in Tibet	Former monks turned nomads. Immolated themselves on the streets of Ngaba. Khaying died the next day, while Choephel died 4 days later.
October 7, 2011	Choephel	19	China	Political situation in Tibet	Former monks turned nomads. Immolated themselves on the streets of Ngaba. Khaying died the next day, while Choephel died 4 days later.
October 15, 2011	Norbu Dramdul	19	China	Political situation in Tibet	Former monk turned nomad. Immolated himself on the streets of Ngaba. Died on January 5, 2012.
October 17, 2011	Tenzin Wangmo	20	China	Political situation in Tibet	Nun from Mame Dechen Chokorling Nunnery in Ngaba. Immolated herself at the intersection of Sancta bridge and the nunnery. Died 10 minutes after at the scene.
October 25, 2011	Dawa Tsering	38	China	Political situation in Tibet	Monk from Kandze Monastery. Immolated himself at the monastery. Status unknown but presumed dead.
November 3, 2011	Palden Choetso	35	China	Political situation in Tibet	Nun from Geden Choeling Nunnery in Tawu. Immolated herself on the same exact spot Tsewang Norbu stood on 3 months prior. Whilst burning, she stood completely still whilst praying before she died.
November 4, 2011	Sherab Tsedor	25	China	Political situation in Tibet	Immolated himself in front of Chinese embassy in New Delhi, India. Survived
November 10, 2011	Bhutuk	40	Nepal	Political situation in Tibet	Survived.
December 1, 2011	Tenzin Phuntsok	46	China	Political situation in Tibet	Former monk turned farmer from Chamdo. Immolated himself in Chamdo. Died 5 days later.
January 6, 2012	Tennyi	20	China	Political situation in Tibet	Former monks turned nomads from Ngaba. Immolated himself at a hotel courtyard in Ngaba. Tennyi died at the scene, while Tsultrim died the next day.
January 6, 2012	Tsultrim	20	China	Political situation in Tibet	Former monks turned nomads from Ngaba. Immolated himself at a hotel courtyard in Ngaba. Tennyi died at the scene, while Tsultrim died the next day.
January 8, 2012	Lama Sopa	42	China	Political situation in Tibet	Rinpoche from Darlag. Immolated himself at a hotel courtyard in Darlag. Died at the scene.
January 14, 2012	Lobsang Jamyang	21	China	Political situation in Tibet	Former monk turned nomad from Ngaba. Immolated himself in the middle of Ngaba. Died shortly after.
February 8, 2012	Rigzin Dorjee	19	China	Political situation in Tibet	Former monk turned nomad from Ngaba. Immolated himself near a school in Ngaba. Died at the scene.
February 9, 2012	Sonam Rabyang	42	China	Political situation in Tibet	Monk from Lab Monastery in Tridu. Immolated himself on the main road of Tridu. Survived but both legs amputated.
February 10, 2012	Tenzin Choedron	18	China	Political situation in Tibet	Nun from Mame Dechen Chokorling nunnery in Ngaba. Immolated herself near a temple. Died at the scene.
February 13, 2012	Lobsang Gyatso	19	China	Political situation in Tibet	Monk from Kirti Monastery in Ngaba. Immolated himself in Ngaba county. Survived but was imprisoned for 5 years.
February 17, 2012	Damchoe Sangpo	38	China	Political situation in Tibet	Monk from Bongthak Monastery. Immolated himself at the monastery. Died at the scene.
February 19, 2012	Nangdrol	18	China	Political situation in Tibet	Student from Dzamthang. Immolated himself in Dzamthang county. Died at the scene.
March 3, 2012	Tsering Kyi	20	China	Political situation in Tibet	Student and nomad from Nyima. Immolated herself at a market in Nyima. Whilst Chinese merchants threw stones at her in disgust, she held her fist up representing unity and freedom. Died at the scene.
March 4, 2012	Rinchen Kyi	32	China	Political situation in Tibet	Mother of 4 and herder from Ngaba. Immolated herself near the Kirti Monastery in Ngaba. Died at the scene.
March 5, 2012	Dorjee	18	China	Political situation in Tibet	Nomad from Chara. Immolated himself near a Chinese office in Chara. Died at the scene.
March 10, 2012	Gepey	18	China	Political situation in Tibet	Monk from Kirti Monastery in Ngaba. Immolated himself near a military camp in Ngaba. Died at the scene.
March 14, 2012	Jamyang Palden	34	China	Political situation in Tibet	Monk from Rongpo Monastery in Rebkong. Immolated himself outside the Rongpo Monastery and lit himself on fire. Died on September 29.
March 16, 2012	Lobsang Tsultrum	20	China	Political situation in Tibet	Monk from Kirti Monastery in Ngaba. Immolated himself in Ngaba. Died 3 days after. Cousin of Norbu Damdrul who immolated himself on October 15, 2011.
March 17, 2012	Sonam Thargyal (Dargye, Dhargay)	44	China	Political situation in Tibet	Farmer in Rebkong, Amdo. Died on the spot.
March 24, 2012	L Bhoja Naik	21	India	For statehood of Telangana	MBA student immolated himself in front of his college. Died on the spot.
March 26, 2012	Jamphel Yeshi	27	India	Political situation in Tibet	Layperson in Delhi. Died 2 days later in hospital.
March 26, 2012	Rajmouli	40	India	For statehood of Telangana	
March 26, 2012	B.R. Goud	n/a	India	For statehood of Telangana	
March 27, 2012	Pallavi	17	India	For statehood of Telangana	Died later in hospital.
March 27, 2012	Kalakanchi Ilaiah	30	India	For statehood of Telangana	Scrap dealer.
March 28, 2012	Lobsang Sherab	20	China	Political situation in Tibet	Monk of Kirti Monastery. In Ngaba, Amdo. Died on the spot.
March 28, 2012	K Uppalaiah	30	India	For statehood of Telangana	
March 28, 2012	Sripuram Srikanth	23	India	For statehood of Telangana	Died on March 30 at the Osmania General Hospital.
March 30, 2012	Tenpa Dhargyal (Darjey)	22	China	Political situation in Tibet	Monks of Tsodun monastery, Barkham, Amdo. Forcibly removed to hospital by Chinese security forces. The current status of Darjey is unknown, while Chime died around midnight.
March 30, 2012	Chimey Palden (Chime)	21	China	Political situation in Tibet	Monks of Tsodun monastery, Barkham, Amdo. Forcibly removed to hospital by Chinese security forces. The current status of Darjey is unknown, while Chime died around midnight.
March 30, 2012	Shyamapuri Shankar	24	India	For statehood of Telangana	
March 30, 2012	Bandavath Suresh	25	India	For statehood of Telangana	Suffered 50% burns.
April 6, 2012	Tulku Athup	47	China	Political situation in Tibet	Tulku Athup was Rinpoche at his monastery. His niece, Atse, was a nun from Seda Larung Wuming Tibetan Buddhist Institute in Tawu. Both immolated themselves at Tulku Athup's home and died at the scene.
April 6, 2012	Atse	23	China	Political situation in Tibet	Tulku Athup was Rinpoche at his monastery. His niece, Atse, was a nun from Seda Larung Wuming Tibetan Buddhist Institute in Tawu. Both immolated themselves at Tulku Athup's home and died at the scene.
April 19, 2012	Sonam	20's	China	Political situation in Tibet	Students from Barma. Immolated themselves in Barma. Died at the scene.
April 19, 2012	Choepak Kyab	20's	China	Political situation in Tibet	Students from Barma. Immolated themselves in Barma. Died at the scene.
May 27, 2012	Dorjee Tseten	19	China	Political situation in Tibet	Dorjee Tseten was originally from Bora, and Dhargye was originally from Ngaba. Both worked as waiters in Lhasa and immolated themselves in front of the Potala Palace in Lhasa. Dorjee Tseten died at the scene, and Dhargye died 41 days later.
May 27, 2012	Dhargye	25	China	Political situation in Tibet	Dorjee Tseten was originally from Bora, and Dhargye was originally from Ngaba. Both worked as waiters in Lhasa and immolated themselves in front of the Potala Palace in Lhasa. Dorjee Tseten died at the scene, and Dhargye died 41 days later.
May 30, 2012	Rikyo	33	China	Political situation in Tibet	Mother of 2 and nomad. Immolated herself near the Jonang Monastery in Dzamthang. Died at the scene.
June 15, 2012	Tamding Thar	50's	China	Political situation in Tibet	Nomad from Chentsa. Immolated himself near a police station in Chentsa. Died at the scene.
June 20, 2012	Tenzin Khedup	24	China	Political situation in Tibet	Tenzin Khedup and Ngawang Norphel were nomads from Dzatoe. Tenzin was previously a monk, while Ngawang also worked as a carpenter. On a street in Dzatoe, both waved the Tibetan flag and immolated themselves. Tenzin Khedup died at the scene, while Ngawang Norphel died 40 days later.
June 20, 2012	Ngawang Norphel	22	China	Political situation in Tibet	Tenzin Khedup and Ngawang Norphel were nomads from Dzatoe. Tenzin was previously a monk, while Ngawang also worked as a carpenter. On a street in Dzatoe, both waved the Tibetan flag and immolated themselves. Tenzin Khedup died at the scene, while Ngawang Norphel died 40 days later.
June 27, 2012	Dickyi Choezom	40's	China	Political situation in Tibet	Businesswoman and mother of 2 from Yulshul. Immolated herself at the Dhondupling monastery. Last reported to be hospitalized.
July 7, 2012	Tsewang Dorjee	22	China	Political situation in Tibet	Nomad and vendor from Damshung. Immolated himself at a market in Damshung. Died later that night.
July 14, 2012	Moshe Silman	57	Israel	Social justice march in Tel Aviv	Social justice activist, suffered 90% burns. Died July 20 in hospital.
July 16, 2012	Zion Vaknin	46	Israel	Social injustice protest	At Beersheba's city hall, in protest of debts.
July 17, 2012	Lobsang Lozin	18	China	Political situation in Tibet	Monk from Gedhun Tashi Choeling Monastery in Barkham. Immolated himself in front of a Chinese government building in front of the monastery. Reported to walk 100 steps before he died from his burns.
July 18, 2012	Valentina Gerasimovna	57	Russia		A woman attempted to self-immolate at the public reception center of the ruling United Russia party in Novosibirsk. Earlier, she addressed the party's public reception center for legal advice as an apartment buyer. Died in a hospital.
July 20, 2012	Akiva Mafi	45	Israel	Social injustice protest	Disabled IDF veteran set himself on fire in Yehud on behalf of wounded veterans. Died August 1, 2012. New agency established to prevent more cases.
July 30, 2012	Đặng Thị Kim Liêng	64	Vietnam	Against 2011 crackdown on Vietnamese youth activists	Tạ Phong Tần's mother. Immolated herself in the early morning. Died en route to the hospital.
August 6, 2012	Lobsang Tsultrim	21	China	Political situation in Tibet	Monk from Kirti Monastery. Immolated himself on a street in Ngaba that is known as "Hero Street". Died later that night.
August 7, 2012	Dolkar Kyi	26	China	Political situation in Tibet	Farmer and mother of 2. Immolated herself near the Tsoe Gaden Choeling Monastery in Kanlho. Died a few hours later.
August 10, 2012	Choepa	24	China	Political situation in Tibet	Nomad from Meruma. Immolated himself on a road in Meruma. Died on the way to the hospital.
August 13, 2012	Tashi	21	China	Political situation in Tibet	Tashi was a former monk turned nomad from Ngaba. Lungtok was a monk from Kirti Monastery. Immolated themselves in Ngaba on a road known as "Hero Street" and died a few hours later.
August 13, 2012	Lungtok	20	China	Political situation in Tibet	Tashi was a former monk turned nomad from Ngaba. Lungtok was a monk from Kirti Monastery. Immolated themselves in Ngaba on a road known as "Hero Street" and died a few hours later.
August 27, 2012	Lobsang Kelsang	18	China	Political situation in Tibet	Lobsang Kelsang was a monk from Kirti Monastery in Ngaba. Dhamchoe was a former monk turned nomad in Ngaba and the younger brother of Tenzin Choedron, who immolated himself on February 10, 2012. Self-immolated near Kirti Monastery in Ngaba and died later that night.
August 27, 2012	Dhamchoe	17	China	Political situation in Tibet	Lobsang Kelsang was a monk from Kirti Monastery in Ngaba. Dhamchoe was a former monk turned nomad in Ngaba and the younger brother of Tenzin Choedron, who immolated himself on February 10, 2012. Self-immolated near Kirti Monastery in Ngaba and died later that night.
September 13, 2012	Passang Lhamo	62	China	Political situation in Tibet	Retired government officer. Immolated herself in Beijing, China in front of the Ministry of housing and Urban-rural development. Status unknown.
September 29, 2012	Yungdrung	29	China	Political situation in Tibet	Farmer from Dzatoe. Immolated himself near a Chinese government building in Dzatoe. Died the next day.
October 4, 2012	Gudrub	43	China	Political situation in Tibet	Writer from Nangchu. Gone to exile in 2005 where he studied in Dharmsala where he returned to Tibet soon after. Known as "Youth of the Snow Realm" for his safety as his writings were about Tibets freedom. Immolated himself at a market in Nangchu. Died at the scene.
October 6, 2012	Sangay Gyatso	26	China	Political situation in Tibet	Nomad from Tsoe. Immolated himself near Dokar Monastery. Died at the scene.
October 13, 2012	Tamdrin Dorje	50's	China	Political situation in Tibet	Nomad and grandfather of a rinpoche. Immolated himself near the Tsoe Monastery. Died at the scene.
October 20, 2012	Lhamo Kyab	27	China	Political situation in Tibet	Farmer and nomad from Bora. Immolated himself near Bora temple. Died at the scene. Short film "Sons of Tibet" is based upon his life and his protest.
October 23, 2012	Dhondup	60's	China	Political situation in Tibet	Nomad from Labrang. Immolated himself at Labrang Monastery. Died at the scene.
October 23, 2012	Dorjee Rinchen	58	China	Political situation in Tibet	Farmer and bread vendor from Labrang. Immolated himself near a police station in Labrang. Died a few hours after.
October 25, 2012	Tsepo	20	China	Political situation in Tibet	Herders and cousins from Driru. Immolated themselves near a Chinese government building. Status unknown.
October 25, 2012	Tenzin	25	China	Political situation in Tibet	Herders and cousins from Driru. Immolated themselves near a Chinese government building. Status unknown.
October 26, 2012	Lhamo Tseten	24	China	Political situation in Tibet	Farmer and nomad from Sangchu. Immolated himself near a court in Sangchu. Died at the scene.
October 26, 2012	Thubwang Gyab	23	China	Political situation in Tibet	Nomad and father of 2 from Sangchu. Immolated himself near a bus stop in Sangchu. Died at the scene.
November 4, 2012	Dorjee Lhundrup	25	China	Political situation in Tibet	Thangka artist and father of 2 from Rebkong. Immolated himself near Rongwo monastery. Died at the scene.
November 7, 2012	Dorjee	15	China	Political situation in Tibet	Monks from Ngoshul Monastery. Immolated themselves in Ngaba. Dorjee died at the scene, while the statuses of Samdup and Dorjee Kyab are unknown.
November 7, 2012	Samdup	16	China	Political situation in Tibet	Monks from Ngoshul Monastery. Immolated themselves in Ngaba. Dorjee died at the scene, while the statuses of Samdup and Dorjee Kyab are unknown.
November 7, 2012	Dorjee Kyab	16	China	Political situation in Tibet	Monks from Ngoshul Monastery. Immolated themselves in Ngaba. Dorjee died at the scene, while the statuses of Samdup and Dorjee Kyab are unknown.
November 7, 2012	Tamding Tso	23	China	Political situation in Tibet	Nomad and mother of 1 from Rebkong. Immolated himself in Rebkong. Died at the scene
November 7, 2012	Tsegyal	27	China	Political situation in Tibet	Nomad and father of 2. Immolated himself near the Bankar village. Died 11 days after as Chinese authorities had arrested him for his protest and refused to give him medical treatment.
November 8, 2012	Kalsang Jinpa	18	China	Political situation in Tibet	Former monk turned Nomad from Rebkong. Immolated himself near the Rongwo Monastery. Died at the scene.
November 10, 2012	Gonpo Tsering	19	China	Political situation in Tibet	Nomad from Tsoe. Immolated himself near the Lushoe Village in Tsoe. Died 2 hours after protest.
November 12, 2012	Nyingkar Tashi	24	China	Political situation in Tibet	Nomads from Rebkong. Immolated themselves in Rebkong. Died at the scene.
November 12, 2012	Nyingchak Bum	18	China	Political situation in Tibet	Nomads from Rebkong. Immolated themselves in Rebkong. Died at the scene.
November 15, 2012	Khabum Gyal	18	China	Political situation in Tibet	Farmer and nomad from Rebkong. Immolated himself on a road known as Rongwo. Died at the scene.
November 15, 2012	Tenzin Dolma	23	China	Political situation in Tibet	Farmer from Rebkong. Immolated himself at a temple in Rebkong. Died at the scene.
November 16, 2012	David Alain	38	France	Political situation in Tibet	Buddhist monk from England.
November 17, 2012	Sangdhak Tsering	24	China	Political situation in Tibet	Farmer and nomad from Tsekhog. Immolated himself in front of a Chinese government building. Died at the scene
November 17, 2012	Chagmo Kyi	27	China	Political situation in Tibet	Mother of 2 and taxi driver. Immolated herself in front of an office building in Rebkong. Died at the scene.
November 19, 2012	Wangchen Norbu	25	China	Political situation in Tibet	Farmer from Kangtsa. Immolated himself at the Kangtsa Gaden Choephelling Monastery. Died at the scene.
November 20, 2012	Tsering Dhondup	34	China	Political situation in Tibet	Farmer, nomad, and father of 3 from Labrang. Immolated himself in front of a gold mine in Labrang. Died at the scene.
November 22, 2012	Lubum Tsering	18	China	Political situation in Tibet	Nomad from Rebkong. Immolated himself at a popular street in Rebkong. Died at the scene.
November 22, 2012	Tamdrin Kyab	23	China	Political situation in Tibet	Former monk turned nomad from Kanlho. Immolated himself near the Luchu river. Died at the scene.
November 23, 2012	Tamdrin Dorjee	29	China	Political situation in Tibet	Herder from Tsekhog. Immolated himself near a Chinese government building in Tsekhog. Died at the scene.
November 25, 2012	Sangay Dolma	17	China	Political situation in Tibet	Nun from Gonshul Nunnery in Tsekhog. Immolated herself near a Chinese government building in Tsekhog. Died at the scene.
November 26, 2012	Wangyal	18	China	Political situation in Tibet	Student from Sertha. Immolated himself near a golden horse statue in the center of Sertha.
November 26, 2012	Kunchok Tsering	18	China	Political situation in Tibet	Nomad from Labrang. Immolated himself in front of a gold mine in Labrang. Died at the scene
November 26, 2012	Gonpo Tsering	24	China	Political situation in Tibet	Nomad and father of 3 from Luchu. Immolated himself at the Ala Deu-go monastery in Luchu. Died at the scene.
November 27, 2012	Kalsang Kyab	24	China	Political situation in Tibet	Nomad from Dzoge. Immolated himself in front of a Chinese government building. Died at the scene.
November 27, 2012	Sangay Tashi	18	China	Political situation in Tibet	Nomad from Sangkhog. Immolated himself in front of a Chinese government building in Sangkhog. Died at the scene.
November 28, 2012	Wande Khar	21	China	Political situation in Tibet	Nomad from Tsoe. Immolated himself in Tsoe county. Died at the scene.
November 29, 2012	Tsering Namgyal	31	China	Political situation in Tibet	Nomad, farmer, and father of 2 from Luchu. Immolated himself in front of a Chinese government building in Luchu. Died at the scene.
November 30, 2012	Kunchok Kyab	29	China	Political situation in Tibet	Nomad and father of 2 from Ngaba. Immolated himself at a gas station in Ngaba. Died at the scene.
December 2, 2012	Sangdag Kyab	17	China	Political situation in Tibet	Nomad and father of 1 from Bora. Immolated himself at Bora Temple. Survived with both legs amputated and imprisoned for 2 years.
December 3, 2012	Lobsang Gedhun	29	China	Political situation in Tibet	Monk from Penag Monastery in Pema. Immolated himself on the streets of Pema and reported to have walked 300 steps before dying from the burns.
December 8, 2012	Pema Dorjee	23	China	Political situation in Tibet	Nomad from Luchu. Immolated himself at Shitsang Monastery. Died at the scene.
December 8, 2012	Kunchok Phelgye	24	China	Political situation in Tibet	Monk from Sumdo Monastery in Dzoege. Immolated himself at the monastery. Died at the scene.
December 9, 2012	Wangchen Kyi	17	China	Political situation in Tibet	Student from Tsekhong. Immolated herself at her village in Tsekhong. Died at the scene.
January 12, 2013	Tsering Tashi	22	China	Political situation in Tibet	Nomad from Amchok. Immolated himself in Amchok town. Died at the scene.
January 18, 2013	Dupchok	28	China	Political situation in Tibet	Nomad from Ngaba. Immolated himself near a police station. Died at the scene.
January 22, 2013	Kunchok Kyab	26	China	Political situation in Tibet	Farmer and nomad from Bora. Immolated himself near the Bora Monastery. Died at the scene.
February 3, 2013	Lobsang Namgyal	37	China	Political situation in Tibet	Monk from Kirti Monastery in Ngaba. Immolated himself in Dzoge. Died at the scene.
February 13, 2013	Drukpa Khar	26	China	Political situation in Tibet	Nomad and father of 3 from Amchok. Immolated himself in Amchok. Died at the scene.
February 13, 2013	Drupchen Tsering	25	Nepal	Political situation in Tibet	Rinpoche who arrived a month prior in Kathmandu. Immolated himself at the Boudhanath Stupa in Kathmandu, Nepal. Died later that day.
February 17, 2013	Namlha Tsering	49	China	Political situation in Tibet	Farmer and nomad from Labrang. Sat on a busy street in Labrang where he lit himself on fire. Died at the scene of his protest.
February 18, 2013	Trayan Marechkov	26	Bulgaria	Part of the 2013 Bulgarian protests	Died on the spot, at a central crossroads, in front of the central office of a private bank in Veliko Tarnovo.
February 19, 2013	Rinchen	17	China	Political situation in Tibet	Students from Dzoge. Immolated themselves at Dzoge. Died at the scene.
February 19, 2013	Sonam Dhargyal	18	China	Political situation in Tibet	Students from Dzoge. Immolated themselves at Dzoge. Died at the scene.
February 20, 2013	Plamen Goranov	36	Bulgaria	Part of the 2013 Bulgarian protests against the Borisov cabinet	Protested corruption and monopolies, and demanded the resignation of Varna's mayor Kiril Yordanov and the Municipal Council. Mountain climber and photographer. Set himself alight in front of the Varna municipality. Died 11 days later in hospital.
February 24, 2013	Phagmo Dhondup	24	China	Political situation in Tibet	Farmer from Tsapon. Immolated himself at the Chachung Monastery in Tsapon. Died a few hours later.
February 24, 2013	Tsesung Kyab	20s	China	Political situation in Tibet	Farmer and nomad from Luchu. Immolated himself at the Shistang Monastery. Died at the scene of his protest. His cousin Pema Dorjee had immolated himself 2 months prior on December 8, 2012, at the same monastery.
February 25, 2013	Sangdag	unknown	China	Political situation in Tibet	Monk from Diphu Monastery in Ngaba. Immolated himself on a road in Ngaba. Status unknown.
February 26, 2013	Ventzislav Vasilev	53	Bulgaria	Part of the 2013 Bulgarian protests	Father of five. Set himself on fire in Radnevo. Died in hospital two weeks later.
March 13, 2013	Kunchok Wangmo	30's	China	Political situation in Tibet	Housewife and mother of 1 from Dzoge. Immolated herself in Dzoge. Died at the scene.
March 13, 2013	Dimitar Dimitrov	51	Bulgaria	Part of the 2013 Bulgarian protests	Set himself on fire in front of the Presidential Palace in Sofia. Hospitalized with life-threatening injuries.
March 16, 2013	Lobsang Thogmey	28	China	Political situation in Tibet	Monk from Kirti Monastery. Immolated himself at the monastery. Died after being taken to hospital.
March 20, 2013	Todor Yovchev	40	Bulgaria	Part of the 2013 Bulgarian protests	Died on March 22
March 24, 2013	Kalkyi	30	China	Political situation in Tibet	Nomad and mother of 4 from Dzamthang. Immolated herself at the Jonang Monastery. Died at the scene
March 25, 2013	Lhamo Kyab	43	China	Political situation in Tibet	Forest keeper from Sangchu. Gathered a pile of logs, poured kerosene on the pile and himself. Proceeded to light the pile alight and then placed himself on top. Died at the scene
March 26, 2013	Kunchok Tenzin	28	China	Political situation in Tibet	Monk from Mokri Monastery in Luchu. Immolated himself at the monastery. Died at scene.
April 16, 2013	Jugtso	20	China	Political situation in Tibet	Mother of 1 from Dzamthang. Immolated herself near the Jonang Monastery in Dzamthang. Died at the scene.
April 24, 2013	Lobsang Dawa	20	China	Political situation in Tibet	Monks from Taktsang Lhamo Kirti Monastery in Dzorge county. Immolated themselves at the monastery. Died at the scene.
April 24, 2013	Kunchok Woeser	23	China	Political situation in Tibet	Monks from Taktsang Lhamo Kirti Monastery in Dzorge county. Immolated themselves at the monastery. Died at the scene.
May 27, 2013	Tenzin Sherab	30	China	Political situation in Tibet	Nomad from Yushu. Immolated himself near the Gyaring area of Yushu. Died at the scene.
May 24, 2013	Bowatte Indarathana	30	Sri Lanka	Against the slaughtering of cattle and alleged conversion of Buddhists to minority religions in Sri Lanka	
June 11, 2013	Wangchen Dolma	31	China	Political situation in Tibet	Nun from Yushu. Immolated herself outside Nyatso monastery in Yushu. Died on June 14, 2013.
June 12, 2013	Andrzej Filipiak	56	Poland	Unemployed receiving no help from the state	Occurred across the street from the Chancellery of the Prime Minister of Poland
July 20, 2013	Kunchok Sonam	18	China	Political situation in Tibet	Monk from Thangkor Sogtsang Monastery in Dzoge. Immolated himself at his monastery. Died at the scene.
August 6, 2013	Karma Ngedon Gyatso	38	Nepal	Political situation in Tibet	Monk from Yangpachen Monastery in Damshung, Tibet until Chinese authorities expelled him due to him being disabled. Arrived in Nepal in 2011. Immolated himself in Kathmandu at the Boudhanath Stupa. Died an hour after.
September 28, 2013	Shichung	41	China	Political situation in Tibet	Farmer, tailor, and father of 2 from Ngaba. Immolated himself in Ngaba. Died at the scene
November 11, 2013	Tsering Gyal	20	China	Political situation in Tibet	Monk from Akyong Monastery in Pema. Immolated himself in Pema county where he ran 10-12 yards towards a government building. Died later that day.
December 3, 2013	Kunchok Tseten	30	China	Political situation in Tibet	Nomad and father of 2 from Meruma in Ngaba. Immolated himself in Ngaba, died at the scene.
December 19, 2013	Tsultrim Gyatso	44	China	Political situation in Tibet	Monk from Amchok Monastery. Set himself on fire in Amchok, died at the scene
February 5, 2014	Phagmo Samdrup	27	China	Political situation in Tibet	Father of 2 and tantric practitioner from Tsekhog. Immolated himself near a school. Died a day after.
February 13, 2014	Lobsang Dorjee	25	China	Political situation in Tibet	Car wash owner from Ngaba. Immolated himself in Ngaba. Died 2 days later.
March 16, 2014	Jigme Tenzin	29	China	Political situation in Tibet	Monk from Sonag Monastery in Rebkong. Immolated himself outside Sonag Monastery, died at the scene.
March 16, 2014	Lobsang Palden	23	China	Political situation in Tibet	Monk from Kirti Monastery in Ngaba. Immolated himself in Ngaba. Died 5 days after.
March 29, 2014	Dolma	29	China	Political situation in Tibet	Nun from Kardze. Set herself on fire near Ba Choede Monastery in Kardze. Status unknown.
April 9, 2014	Unidentified man	20s	Australia	Denial of application for refugee status	Survived.
April 15, 2014	Thinley Namgyal	32	China	Political situation in Tibet	Nomad and farmer. Set himself on fire in Kardze. Died at the scene.
May 23, 2014	Le Thi Tuyet Mai	67	Vietnam	Chinese deployment of a giant oil rig in Vietnam.	Deputy head of executive committee of the Buddhist Youth movement in Ho Chi Minh City. Immolated himself at 5:30 am, died at the scene. Left banners saying "The Unified Buddhist Church of Vietnam will survive side by side with the Vietnamese people! All together against Chinese invasion! I offer my body as a torch to light the path of all patriots! Support the Declaration of UBCV Patriarch Thich Quang Do to oppose China's invasion of Vietnamese waters and lands."
May 31, 2014	Leo Seemanpillai	29	Australia	Difficulties in receiving approval for asylum claim	Died the following day.
June 20, 2014	Thu Hoang	71	United States	In apparent response to the Hai Yang Shi You 981 standoff	Apparent protest by a Vietnamese man of a Chinese state-owned oil rig being placed into waters contested by Vietnam in the South China Sea
June 28, 2014	Unidentified man		Japan	Defence policy changes	Survived.
June 23, 2014	Charles R. Moore	79	United States	Social injustice	Set himself alight in a strip mall parking lot, died upon arrival at hospital.
September 16, 2014	Kunchok	42	China	Political situation in Tibet	Set self on fire in front of a police station. Believed to have died shortly after protest.
September 17, 2014	Lhamo Tashi	22	China	Political situation in Tibet	Student from Amchok. Previously involved in the 2008 Tibetan unrest. set himself on fire in Tsoe City. Died at the scene
December 16, 2014	Sangye Khar	33	China	Political situation in Tibet	Nomad and father of 2. Set himself on fire near a police station and died at the scene after walking a few steps while on fire.
December 22, 2014	Tsepey	19	China	Political situation in Tibet	Nomad from Meruma. Set herself on fire near a market in Ngaba. Died at the scene.
December 23, 2014	Kalsang Yeshi	37	China	Political situation in Tibet	Monk from Nyitso Monastery in Tawu. Set himself on fire near his monastery and a police station. Died at the scene. Left a picture of His Holiness the Dalai Lama with the caption "The Six Million Tibetans are waiting for you."
March 5, 2015	Norchuk	47	China	Political situation in Tibet	Nomad and mother of 3. Set herself on fire at her village. Died at the scene
March 14, 2015	Younes Asakere	34	Iran	Discrimination of Ahwazi Arabs	Immolated himself after local authorities confiscated his vendor stall in Khorramshahr. Died on March 22. Inspired a mass protest which resulted in arrests of some 1,000 people and further self-immolations.
April 8, 2015	Yeshi Khandro	47	China	Political situation in Tibet	Nun in Kardze. Set herself on fire near a police station calling for the freedom in Tibet and the long life and return of His Holiness the Dalai Lama in Tibet. Died shortly afterwards.
April 15, 2015	Neykyab	45	China	Political situation in Tibet	Father of 7 from Ngaba. Set himself on fire at his home and died at the scene. His brother in law Dhargye set himself on fire on May 27, 2012.
May 20, 2015	Tenzin Gyatso	35	China	Political situation in Tibet	Father of 4 from Tawu. Immolated himself in front of a government building, died shortly after.
May 27, 2015	Sangye Tso	36	China	Political situation in Tibet	Business owner and mother of 2. Set herself on fire in front of a government office in Tsoe. died at the scene. left a note saying "Long Live His Holiness the Dalai Lama, where is the panchen lama, and freedom for Tibetans!
July 9, 2015	Sonam Topgyal	26	China	Political situation in Tibet	monk from Nangchen county. Came to Kyegydo and set himself on fire in Gesar square. Died the following day. Left behind a note calling for the freedom of Tibet
August 12, 2015	Choi Yeon-yeol	80	South Korea	Japanese colonization of Korea and military conduct during World War II	Set himself on fire in a flower bed near the Japanese embassy in Seoul during an anti-Japan protest by "comfort women" (survivors of World War II Japanese military brothels). Injuries sustained were not life-threatening. Condition Pending.
August 27, 2015	Tashi Kyi	55	China	Political situation in Tibet	Mother of 5. Immolated herself near her house in Sangchu and died at the scene. Her nephew Sangay Tashi had immolated himself on November 27, 2012.
September 17, 2015	Shurmo	26	China	Political situation in Tibet	Immolated himself at a bus stop. Protest was hidden for 5 years by the Chinese government.
October 18, 2015	Khodayar Amini	30	Australia	Australian refugee policy	Immolated himself in Melbourne during a video call to his advocates.
October 24, 2015	Erlan Bektibaev	20	Kazakhstan	Social injustice	Doused himself with gasoline and set himself on fire on October 24 in front of the Taraz headquarters of the ruling party Nur Otan (now since 2022 Amanat) in Taraz. Bektibayev was rushed to hospital, but later died of his burns. He was buried in Aqsukent, Sayram District, Turkistan Region.
November 13, 2015	S. Erdene		Mongolia	Protest of coal mine being sold to China as well as employees being laid off by the government	Coal mine union leader. Called for a press conference where he doused himself with an accelerant and proceeded to set himself on fire. Suffered burns on 40% of his body.
February 29, 2016	Dorjee Tsering	16	India	Political situation in Tibet	Died 3 days later in a New Delhi hospital. American presidential candidate Hillary Clinton held up his photograph while speaking to a Tibetan advocacy group.
February 29, 2016	Kalsang Wangdu	18	China	Political situation in Tibet	Monk in Kardze. Immolated himself calling for Tibet's independence. Died on the way to the hospital.
March 19, 2016	Charles Ingram	51	United States	Corruption at the United States Department of Veterans Affairs	Military veteran walked 15 km to a military veteran hospital before immolating himself in the hospital's parking lot.
March 23, 2016	Sonam Tso	50s	China	Political situation in Tibet	Mother of 5. Immolated herself at Sera Monastery. Died at the scene.
April 27, 2016	Omid Masoumali	23	Nauru	Australian refugee policy	Iranian refugee immolated himself at an Australian refugee detention camp during a visit to the camp by representatives of a UNHCR fundraising arm (Australia for UNHCR) who told the refugees to expect to remain on Nauru for "another ten years". After more than 24 hours without adequate medical attention he was airlifted by private contractor to Brisbane, Australia where he died on 29 April 2016 from his burns.
May 2, 2016	Hodan Yasi	21	Nauru	Australian refugee policy	In an Australian refugee detention camp. Woman from Somalia (variously referred to as Hadon/Hodan and Yasin/Yasi) was airlifted from Nauru to Brisbane but her condition as at late May 2016 is shrouded in secrecy. It seems she may still be alive, since her death would have to be reported under Queensland Law and an inquest into her death held as she would be deemed to be a "Death in Custody" had she died.
December 8, 2016	Tashi Rabten	33	China	Political situation in Tibet	Nomad and father of 3. Immolated himself in Machu, died at the scene after taking a few steps while on fire. His younger cousin Tsering Kyi had also immolated herself on March 3, 2012.
February 11, 2017	Unknown man	unknown	Sudan	Protest against Omar Al-Bashir	Shouted "I am Sudanese and Bashir is a dictator!" before setting himself on fire. Reported to survive
March 18, 2017	Pema Gyaltsen	24	China	Political situation in Tibet	Farmer from Nyarong. Shouted that Tibet had no freedom and for His Holiness the Dalai Lama return to Tibet while on fire. Status unknown
April 15, 2017	Wangchuk Tseten	30	China	Political situation in Tibet	Layman and father of 3. Immolated himself in Kardze. Status unknown but likely deceased
May 2, 2017	Chakdor Kyab	16	China	Political situation in Tibet	Farmer and student from Bora. Immolated himself on Bora monastery shouting "Tibet wants freedom! Let His Holiness the Dalai Lama come back to Tibet! Victory to the Gods!" Status unknown
May 18, 2017	Jamyang Losal	24	China	Political situation in Tibet	Monk from Chentsa. Immolated himself near a concert. Died soon afterwards.
May 19, 2017	Unknown	54	Germany	Islamization of Germany	Died in hospital. Police said the man had scrawled slogans on his car along the lines of "Never again war on German soil" and "Amri is only the tip of the iceberg" — a reference to Anis Amri, the Tunisian who attacked a Christmas market in Berlin and whom authorities had previously been unable to deport.
July 15, 2017	Tenzin Choeying	20	India	Political situation in Tibet	Suffered 50% burns. Died nine days later from his injuries.
July 29, 2017	Pasang Dhondup	49	India	Political situation in Tibet	Died in Dharamshala
September 21, 2017	Zdenek Hanzlik	60	New Zealand	Family Court Injustices	Zdenek "Sid" Hanzlik immolated himself outside the New Zealand Parliament Buildings protesting injustices in the Family Court, where he was engaged in an ongoing legal battle relating to access to his children. He was taken to Wellington Hospital, where he later succumbed to his injuries.
October 19, 2017	Piotr Szczęsny	54	Poland	Rule of Law and Justice political party	Leaflets were strewn around him on the ground outside of the Palace of Culture and Science, and a speaker was broadcasting a song by a 1990s Polish rock band titled "I love freedom".
November 26, 2017	Tenga	63	China	Political situation in Tibet	Respected monk from Kardze. Shouted "We want freedom in Tibet!" before self-immolating. Died shortly after. His picture was shown by Hollywood actor Richard Gere during a conference
December 23, 2017	Konpe	30	China	Political situation in Tibet	Former monk turned nomad. Immolated himself in Ngaba and died the following day.
January 15, 2018	Dmitry Rudov	39	Russia	Corruption of government	After being sacked from Gazprom's subsidiary and unsuccessfully appealing to President Putin, he set himself on fire in front of Ishimbay's City Hall in Bashkortostan. Died in hospital the next day.
March 7, 2018	Tsekho Tugchak	44	China	Political situation in Tibet	Nomad in Ngaba. 2 brothers were tortured and killed by the Chinese police for participating in the 2008 Tibetan unrest. Tsekho set himself on fire after shouting slogans and died at the scene.
April 14, 2018	David Buckel	60	United States	Climate change and pollution	In a note sent to The New York Times and other news outlets, along with a copy attached to a shopping cart near his body he stated fossil fuel use and the environmental destruction it causes as the reason he decided to end his life by self-immolation with fossil fuels. Buckel was a prominent lawyer for gay rights, and was involved in environmental causes.
May 20, 2018	Fathi Harb	20	Palestine	Economic situation in Gaza	Died on May 23.
May 29, 2018	Unidentified man	35	Germany	Denial of asylum claim	Iranian asylum seeker set self on fire in government building in Göppingen after showing staff a letter denying him asylum. Listed in serious condition.
June 20, 2018	Chloe Sagal	31	United States	Homelessness and mental health issues	Several days after threatening self-harm with a machete, Sagal walked into a downtown Oregon Park, read a statement regarding homelessness and mental health before covering herself with fluid and setting herself alight.
June 26, 2018	John Watts	58	United States	Corruption at the United States Department of Veterans Affairs	Military veteran immolated himself on the steps of the Georgia state Capitol to protest corruption at the United States Department of Veterans Affairs.
August 3, 2018	Vatan Karabash	47–48	Crimea (disputed)	Russian annexation of Crimea and repressions of the Crimean Tatars	Karabash set himself on fire in public, declaring Russia policies to be lawless; he had previously expressed anger at plans for demolition of Crimean Tatar houses in Russian-annexed Crimea, which had been deemed "illegal" since they were built before deported Crimean Tatars were permitted to return. Bystanders put out the flames and the injuries were reported to be non-fatal.
August 15, 2018	Unknown	50s	United Kingdom	Homelessness	A woman in her fifties (later identified under the pseudonym "Melanie Smith"), under threat of eviction and suffering from mental health issues set herself on fire at the housing office of Barnet London Borough Council. She died in intensive care several months later, with council employees reportedly having been ordered not to discuss the incident with journalists.
September 19, 2018	Nicholas McCrary	29	United States	Involuntary celibacy and mental health	McCrary was a prolific YouTuber who had autism and whose videos were popular with "blackcels" (black incels). He also used the pseudonym Baraka Mckray, and accused black women of being "prejudiced" against autistic men such as himself.
September 27, 2018	Umit Acar	26	Germany	Against the imprisonment of Abdullah Öcalan	Immolated himself in Ingolstadt, as Recep Tayyip Erdoğan was to visit Germany.
November 4, 2018	Dopo	23	China	Political situation in Tibet	Nomad in Ngaba. Shouted "May His Holiness the Dalai Lama live long! May we soon behold his golden countenance!" and set self ablaze after. Died at the scene
November 28, 2018	Mahsun Özen	21	Turkey	Treatment of Kurds in Turkey	Immolated himself on the anniversary of the Roboski airstrike in which 34 Kurds died
December 8, 2018	Drugko	22	China	Political situation in Tibet	Former monk turned nomad. Immolated himself in Ngaba. Status unknown.
December 9, 2018	Gedhun Gyatso	16	China	Political situation in Tibet	Monk in Ngaba. Immolated himself in Ngaba, died shortly afterwards
December 24, 2018	Abdel Razaq Zorgi	32	Tunisia	Unemployment and economic situation in Tunisia	Journalist based in Kasserine. Made a video minutes before protest where he urged called for the unemployed to revolt. Died the same day after taken to a hospital.
January 18, 2019	Unknown	54	Czech Republic	In memory of Jan Palach who burned himself to death in 1969, protesting the Warsaw Pact invasion of Czechoslovakia	Suffered 30% burns after setting himself on fire at the central Wenceslas Square of Prague on the 50th anniversary of Jan Palach's death from his self-immolation protest against the Soviet-led invasion of Czechoslovakia. According to Czech authorities, "he said it was only a remembrance to Jan Palach".
February 20, 2019	Uğur Şakar	43	Germany	Against the imprisonment of Abdullah Öcalan	Immolated himself in front of the Court in Krefeld, Germany; died in hospital a month later
May 29, 2019	Arnav Gupta	33	United States	Unknown	An Indian-origin resident of Bethesda, Maryland died in hospital that day after setting himself on fire near the White House in Washington, D.C. while wearing a USA T-shirt. The Washington Post described his actions as "an unmistakable protest, the loudest, most spectacular cry that people in pain can come up with".
July 19, 2019	Kim (surname)	78	South Korea	Unknown	A man used 20 liters of fuel to set himself on fire in his car in the early morning outside the Japanese embassy in Seoul. He died several hours later in the hospital.
September 9, 2019	Sahar Khodayari	29	Iran	The right for women in Iran to attend a football match alongside men	The Iranian female football fan died one week after setting herself on fire outside an Iranian court, reportedly after learning she may have to serve a six-month sentence for trying to enter a football stadium (alongside men).
September 10, 2019	Albert Razin	79	Russia	The declining status and use of the Udmurt language in Russia.	The scholar and activist set himself on fire outside the State Council building in Izhevsk, Udmurt Republic, as the regional government was considering passing a bill to reduce the status of the indigenous Udmurt language in the republic. Razin died the same day.
October 23, 2019	Ali Wazir	31	Switzerland	In protest of the Turkish invasion of Syria	A Syrian Kurdish man set himself on fire in front of the seat of the UNHCR in Geneva.
November 10, 2019	Anas Kournif	22	France	Student living costs, fascism, neoliberalism	A 22-year-old man enrolled at Lyon 2 University set himself on fire in front of a CROUS office in response to the cut of his grant. In a post on Facebook, he blamed Emmanuel Macron, François Hollande, Nicolas Sarkozy and the EU for having "killed" him, and also attacked Marine Le Pen and media figures for creating fear, also urging readers to "Fight against the rise of fascism which divides us, and against liberalism which creates inequalities" and also wanted the creation of a "Student Wage". He was admitted to hospital with 90% burns over his body, but survived.
November 26, 2019	Yonten	24	China	Political situation in Tibet	Tibetan nomad. Formerly monk at Kirti Monastery. Immolated himself in Ngaba. Died at the scene

=== 2020s ===
Date	Name	Age	Country	Protesting	Notes and references
February 7, 2020	Adem Yarıcı	42	Turkey	Unemployment in Turkey	42-year-old unemployed man, father of two, set himself on fire in front of Hatay governor's office. Witnesses said that he shouted "My kids are hungry!" before setting himself ablaze. He died on the same day. The governor claimed that Yarıcı divorced from his wife a while ago, had mental illness and had attempted to immolate himself before.
June 16, 2020	Unknown	48	Poland	Unknown; reportedly said there is "no justice" to police at the scene	A 48-year-old man set himself on fire shortly after talking to journalists outside of the Sejm building in Warsaw, Poland.
July 27, 2020	Arie den Dekker	54	Netherlands	Murder witness, removed from family, turned homeless	Den Dekker had witnessed a murder in 2018. Following this, his house was torched multiple times and he was put into a witness protection program. Unable to be with his family and having his pleas ignored by the municipality and the government, Den Dekker protested in front of Oss' city hall multiple times, throwing dead fish inside, dousing himself in cow feces and committing other acts of despair on multiple occasions. On July 27 he committed suicide by self-immolation in front of the city hall.
August 3, 2020	Yavuz Polat	46	Turkey	Economic issues	A 47-year-old street vendor from Erzincan set himself on fire after the police wanted him to remove his corn stall. He died on August 27.
August 14, 2020	Fikret Güven		Turkey	Economic issues	A tea maker set himself on fire in front of the Bursa governorship after the police closed the roads to his shop.
September 18, 2020	Syarhei Radchenya	36	Belarus	Fraudulent election and follow-on police abuse and brutality against protests in Belarus.	36-year-old Syarhei Radchenya set himself on fire in Smalavichy, Belarus, near the local police department. According to the press service of the Ministry of Internal Affairs, Syarhei poured gasoline over himself from a canister and set it on fire after which an employee ran out of the district department building and put out the fire. Syarhei was hospitalized in critical condition with burns on 84% of his body surface, including the respiratory tract. He died on September 25, 2020, as a result of his injuries.
October 2, 2020	Irina Slavina	47	Russia	Journalist; her apartment was searched the day before by the police alleging her ties to the Open Russia group	Russian journalist Irina Slavina set herself on fire in front of the Interior Ministry office in Nizhniy Novgorod. She died there of the resulting burns.
November 2, 2020	Leroy Archie Ponpon		Liberia	Chief Justice refusing months of salary for workers	Led several protests prior to self-immolation date. Survived.
January 11, 2021	Liu Jin	48	China	Employers refusing to make payment as well as fair treatment for delivery workers	Delivery worker in Taizhou. Asked for payment from employers but was denied. Set fire shortly afterwards. Died soon after.
February 12, 2021	Halil S.	49	Germany	Against the detention conditions of Abdullah Öcalan	He set himself on fire in front of the Landtag in Dresden. Died soon after.
April 12, 2021	Itzik Saidyan	26	Israel	Government treatment of disabled veterans	He set himself on fire in front of the Defense Ministry's rehabilitation department offices in Petah Tikva that handles the rehabilitation of injured soldiers, two days before the annual Memorial Day. Saidyan fought in the 2014 war in Gaza, Operation Protective Edge, and has post-traumatic stress disorder.
May 18, 2021	Behzad Mahmoudi	25	Iraq	Poor treatment and living conditions of refugees	Asylum seeker from Iran. Immolated himself in front of journalists. Died on May 23, 2021.
September 7, 2021	Neji Hefiane	26	Tunisia	Lack of compensation from government	Self-immolated in front of family after not receiving compensation for injuries sustained during the Tunisian revolution. Later died.
September 14, 2021	Ela Nikbayan	40	Germany	Transphobia and treatment of immigrants	40 year old trans woman who burned herself publicly in Alexanderplatz square, Berlin. Ela had immigrated from Iran years earlier.
January 1, 2022	Unknown		Australia	Vaccine ID and mandates	He set himself on fire on Church St. in Richmond, Victoria, sustaining life-threatening injuries. The man was stopped by paramedics and police.
February 25, 2022	Tsewang Norbu	25	China	Political situation in Tibet	Popular Tibetan singer from Nangchu. Immolated himself in front of the Potala Palace in Lhasa. Died in the hospital a few days later.
March 27, 2022	Taphun	81	China	Political situation in Tibet	Nomad from Meruma nomadic village in Ngaba. Immolated himself in front of a police station near Kirti Monastery. Died a few hours after.
March 30, 2022	Tsering Samdup		China	Political situation in Tibet	Immolated himself near a monastery in Kyegudo. Status unknown.
April 22, 2022	Wynn Bruce	54	United States	Protesting climate change inaction	Man from Boulder, Colorado immolated himself in front of the Supreme Court Building in Washington, D.C. Died from injuries. Described himself as a Buddhist and climate activist.
May 18, 2022	Krishanpal	52	India	Police inaction	He set himself ablaze outside an SSP office alleging police inaction over a complaint he filed against some people for destroying his crops.
June, 2022	Unknown monk		China	Political situation in Tibet	Monk from Kanhlo prefecture in Gansu. Immolated himself in front of a portrait of His Holiness the Dalai Lama. Died at the scene.
September 21, 2022	Unknown	70s	Japan	Funeral of Shinzo Abe	A man in his 70s set himself on fire near the Prime Minister's Official Residence in protest of the decision to hold an official state funeral for former Prime Minister Shinzo Abe.
January 24, 2023	Prem Prasad Acharya	37	Nepal	Corruption in Nepal as well as his unsuccessful business career	Died 3 days after.
January 31, 2023	Unknown	58	Brazil	Supreme Federal Court	The 58-year-old native of Botucatu, São Paulo set fire to his own body in the central median of the Esplanade of the Ministries and shouted against Alexandre de Moraes, saying "morte ao Xandão" (lit. 'death to Xandão'). Alongside the man, papers with photos of Johann Georg Elser, Nelson Mandela, and Claus von Stauffenberg were found; all images were accompanied by the phrase "perdeu, mané" (lit. 'you lost, dude'), previously used by Luís Roberto Barroso. He remained hospitalized for two days and died on 2 February.
March 1, 2023	Chet Bohrer	42	United States	Bullying and mental health	42 year old resident of Salt Lake City, Utah set himself on fire at Bancroft Way and Telegraph Ave on the UC Berkeley campus. He had no known affiliation with the university. Bohrer died in the hospital from his injuries days later. He claimed to have been bullied and spied on by the Church of Jesus Christ of Latter-Day Saints.
March 27, 2023	Ahmed Jaouad	61	Morocco	Precarity, insufficient pension fund	A Moroccan playwright died six days after setting himself on fire following a failed hunger strike in hopes of raising his pension fund from his thirty years of service at the Moroccan Ministry of Culture which was insufficient to provide for his family. Jaouad's wife and children were awarded financial compensation by the ministry after his death.
April 13, 2023	Nizar Issaoui	35	Tunisia	Human rights in Tunisia, Anti-police sentiment	A local Tunisian footballer died after setting himself on fire in what he said was a protest against Tunisia's "police state". During his funeral, demonstrators started throwing stones at police, who retaliated with tear gas.
May 1, 2023	Yang Hoe-dong		South Korea	Union violations as well as charges he received as a Union activist	Popular labour rights activist. Immolated himself in front of a courthouse, deceased.
May 24, 2023	DeAndre Gordon		United States	Protest of racism and corruption at Red Onion prison	Prisoner at the Red Onion prison in Virginia. Set a fire in his cell due to mistreatment and beatings he received from prison guards. Survived.
May 21, 2023	Karl-Udson Azor	30	Haiti	Protest against the government	Immolated himself in front of the Vertieres Monument. Died at the scene with Haitian flag next to him.
August 1, 2023	Bar Kalaf	33	Israel	The Defense Ministry denying him disability status	Kalaf served in the Israeli Defense Force from 2008 to 2011 and saw combat in Operation Protective Edge as a reservist, where he claimed he developed post-traumatic stress disorder. The Defense Ministry rejected his application for disability status, stating he had a mental disorder unrelated to his military duties. Kalaf immolated himself in his home and afterwards was rushed to Sheba Medical Center in Ramat Gan where he died.
August 17, 2023	Robert Gituhu	28	Kenya	Unemployment and poverty in Kenya and high cost of food	Graduated with Engineer degree. Climbed statue in Mobasa and immolated himself. Died several hours after 80% burns on body.
November 8, 2023	Unknown male		DRC	Protest of the genocide in the Democratic Republic of Congo	Congolese man set himself on fire to protest the ongoing genocide in the Democratic Republic of Congo (DRC). The video, which was posted on Twitter on November 8, 2023, shows the man, who has not been identified, standing in front of a crowd in Kinshasa, the capital of the DRC, holding a sign that reads "Stop the genocide in Congo".
December 1, 2023	Unknown female	27	United States	Protest against United States support for Israel in the Gaza war	Protester immolated herself outside the Israeli Consulate in Atlanta, Georgia; following what officials described as "an act of extreme political protest", a Palestinian national flag was recovered at the scene.
February 25, 2024	Aaron Bushnell	25	United States	Protest against United States support for Israel in the Gaza war	The active-duty US Airman immolated himself outside the Israeli Embassy in Washington, D.C. He was taken to a hospital where he succumbed to his injuries.
April 9, 2024	Yassine Selmi	22	Tunisia	Protest against police	Construction worker. Resolved a fight between the police and 2 unidentified people where police threatened him with arrest. He set himself on fire over the police threats. Died 2 days later.
April 19, 2024	Maxwell Azzarello	37	United States	Protest against the US Government	A 37-year-old man from St. Augustine, Florida immolated himself outside of the New York courthouse where jurors were being chosen for the New York State criminal trial of former U.S. President Donald Trump after posting an anti-government manifesto online.
May 1, 2024	Ruslan Palitsyn	24	Russia	Protest of army enlistment during the Russian invasion of Ukraine	Ruslan was an actor. He lit himself on fire outside a Russian military registration in St Petersburg where he suffered 90% burns. He died the day after.
June 11, 2024	Darko Štimac	57	Croatia	Inability to exercise his rights in court and failure of Andrej Plenković to hear his concerns	Croatian Army veteran set himself on fire in St. Mark's Square and died in hospital.
July 26, 2024	Vladimir Arsenyev	74	Russia	Government pressure	President of Volna Central Research Institute for Russia's Defense Ministry. Walked to Lenin Mausoleum in the center of Red Square and set himself on fire. Suffered severe burns, but survived.
August 23, 2024	Demetrius Wallace	27	United States	Protest against corruption and illegal retaliation from prison staff	Prisoner at Red Onion prison. Filed a lawsuit on the prison after he was attacked by prison officials where they retaliated. He soon set himself on fire in his cell receiving burns on his foot. Survived.
August 28, 2024	Mano Yogalingam	23	Australia	Protest on asylum seeker bridging visas.	Yogalingam was a Tamil asylum seeker who immolated himself in Melbourne's south-east after attending a majority of the protests being held outside the Department of Home Affairs.
September 11, 2024	Matt Nelson	45	United States	Protest against United States support for Israel in the Gaza war	A protestor immolated himself outside the Boston, Massachusetts Israeli Consulate. He was taken to Massachusetts General Hospital afterwards. Died in hospital 4 days later.
September 15, 2024	Ekong Eshiet	28	United States	Protest against religious violations isolation, racism, and brutality against prison inmates	Ekong and Trayvon were both inmates at Red Onion State Prison in Virginia. On September 15, both men set themselves on fire in solitary confinement making these demands and suffered third degree burns and were transferred to University of Virginia. Ekong appeared on a PrisonRadio show where he revealed his reasons why he immolated himself and that he had begun a hunger strike but other prison inmates also began a hunger strike.
September 15, 2024	Trayvon Brown		United States	Protest against religious violations isolation, racism, and brutality against prison inmates	Ekong and Trayvon were both inmates at Red Onion State Prison in Virginia. On September 15, both men set themselves on fire in solitary confinement making these demands and suffered third degree burns and were transferred to University of Virginia. Ekong appeared on a PrisonRadio show where he revealed his reasons why he immolated himself and that he had begun a hunger strike but other prison inmates also began a hunger strike.
October 5, 2024	Samuel Mena Jr	29	United States	Protest against United States support for Israel in the Gaza war	Photojournalist for KTVK from Phoenix, Arizona. Attempted self-immolation in Washington DC in front of the White House. Set arm on fire but flames quickly doused by protesters. Taken to hospital with burns on arms.
October 18, 2024	Unknown	56	Chile	Protest against the government for a case of unlawful coercion against him	A 56-year-old man attempted self-immolation outside of the Palacio de los Tribunales de Justicia de Santiago, Chile. Flames where quickly doused by Carabineros, and the man was taken to hospital with burns on his neck.
December 31, 2024	Sunil	35	India	Police harassment	Rickshaw driver who was harassed by police officers. Burned himself at his home. Died 7 days later.
January 3, 2025	Raju Patel	25	India	Protest of hazardous waste to Pithampur for incineration	Both men were present at a protest with dozens of other people. They were seen dousing themselves with an accelerant and lighting themselves on fire. Both are in the hospitals with burn injuries.
January 3, 2025	Rajkumar Raghuvanshi	27	India	Protest of hazardous waste to Pithampur for incineration	Both men were present at a protest with dozens of other people. They were seen dousing themselves with an accelerant and lighting themselves on fire. Both are in the hospitals with burn injuries.
January 15, 2025	Unknown man	60s	South Korea	Impeachment of Yoon Suk Yeol	Set himself on fire near South Korea's corruption investigation office. Later died of his injuries.
January 20, 2025	Thairie Ritchie	29	United States	Political protest	Civil rights activist from Santa Cruz. Set himself on fire on the Black Lives Matter mural at Santa Cruz City Hall. Survived, but current condition unconfirmed.
February 15, 2025	Sunil Kumar Mishra		India	Firing from bank and abuse	Former bank employee for IDFC in Varanasi. Fired from the bank where he soon doused himself and recorded a video revealing the extreme stress, mental breakdown, and suicides. Soon set himself ablaze with flames extinguished quickly by bystanders. Survived.
February 24, 2025	Aleksandr Okunev	37	Russia	Russian invasion of Ukraine	A former computer programmer from Kaliningrad, Okunev set himself on fire in front of a World War II memorial in the city centre on the night of the third anniversary of Russia's full-scale invasion of Ukraine. A paint inscription "no to war" was discovered in the snow near his burned body. Local authorities and media suppressed all information about Okunev's self-immolation, and the event only became publicized over a year later.
February 25, 2025	Mohammad Asif Javed Jutt	48	Pakistan	Illegal practices from his former employer, attempt to dismantle workers union, workers rights	Worked at Nestle's Kabirwala plant for 16 years. Attempted to unionize for better labor conditions but was fired. Fought for 9 years in court, immolated himself inside the premises of Pakistan's Lahore High Court. Died days later. Left behind a wife and 4 children.
March 7, 2025	Unknown man	79	South Korea	Impeachment of Yoon Suk Yeol	Supporter of Yoon Suk Yeol. Carried pamphlets denouncing opposition bloc and supporting Yoon. Immolated himself near Seoul City Hall around noon. He died shortly after.
November 16, 2025	Bilal Ahmad Wani	50s	India	Arrest of relatives for 2025 Delhi car explosion	Died the following day.
December 15, 2025	Prakash Sawant		India	Legal issues	Suffered 50% burns after self-immolating outside the Bombay High Court.
April 23, 2026	Shankar Goud	50	India	Bus drivers' strike	Died the following day.
May 18, 2026	M. Venkatesan	46	India	Lack of government action during a dispute	Suffered 60% burns.
May 19, 2026	Unknown man		Afghanistan	Economic issues	Died the following day.
July 2, 2026	Lobga Rangzen	52	United States	Political situation in Tibet, especially in response to the Law on Promoting Ethnic Unity and Progress	Occurred outside the headquarters of the United Nations. He was taken to the hospital but was pronounced dead.

== See also ==
- 2011 Algerian self-immolations
- Self-immolation protests by Tibetans in China
