= Friot =

Friot is a surname. Notable people with the surname include:

- Bernard Friot (born 1946), French sociologist and economist
- Stephen P. Friot (born 1947), United States judge
