= Kariv, Ukraine =

Rural locality in Lviv Oblast, Ukraine

Kariv Ка́рів
- Village
- Location within Lviv Oblast
- Coordinates: 50°20′49″N 23°47′56″E
- Country: Ukraine
- Oblast: Lviv Oblast
- District: Chervonohrad Raion
- Established: 1490

Area
  - Total: 46 km^{2} (18 sq mi)
- Elevation /(average value of): 211 m (692 ft)

Population
  - Total: 1,157
  - Density: 25/km^{2} (65/sq mi)
- Time zone: UTC+2 (EET)
  - Summer (DST): UTC+3 (EEST)
- Postal code: 80066
- Area code: +380 3257
- Website: село Карів, райцентр Сокаль ^{(Ukrainian)}

Kariv (Ukrainian: Ка́рів) is a small village (selo) in Chervonohrad Raion, Lviv Oblast of Western Ukraine. It belongs to Belz urban hromada, one of the hromadas of Ukraine.

The total area of the village is 4.6 km^{2}, and the population is around 1157 people. Local government is administered by Karivska village council.

== Geography ==
This village is located on the altitude of 211 metres (690 ft) above sea level, and is located at a distance 72 kilometres (45 mi) from the regional center of Lviv, 57 kilometres (35 mi) from the district center Sokal, and 47 kilometres (29 mi) from the mining city Chervonohrad.

== History and Attractions ==
Archival records of Kariv date back to 1490.

Until 18 July 2020, Kariv belonged to Sokal Raion. The raion was abolished in July 2020 as part of the administrative reform of Ukraine, which reduced the number of raions of Lviv Oblast to seven. The area of Sokal Raion was merged into Chervonohrad Raion.

The Church of St. Paraskeva (1887, stone) is an architectural monument of local importance.

== Famous people ==
- Vasyl Makukh – Ukrainian Soviet dissident
- Viktor Hryhorovych Matyuk – Ukrainian composer, author of the textbook of science of harmony, priest and folklorist. He is buried in the cemetery in the village Kariv; there is a monument.

== Literature ==
- Історія міст і сіл УРСР : Львівська область, Сокальський район, Карів. – К. : ГРУРЕ, 1968 р. Page 750 (in Ukrainian)
