= Moshe Silman =

Israeli activist (1954–2012)

- משה סילמן
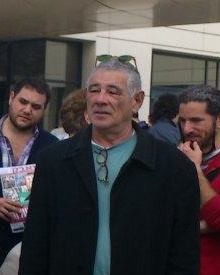
- Born: 26 November 1954
- Died: 20 July 2012 (aged 57); Tel Aviv, Israel
- Cause of death: Burns from self-immolation
- Known for: Self-immolation

Moshe Silman (Hebrew: משה סילמן; 26 November 1954 – 20 July 2012) was an Israeli activist who set himself on fire during a social justice demonstration in protest of Israel's welfare system on 14 July 2012. Silman was burned severely and died of his injuries a week later.

Silman's self-immolation was widely covered in the Israeli and international media and was followed by wide public and political discourse within Israeli society.

== Background ==
Moshe Silman was born in 1954. He was never married and he had no children. He ran away from home at age 14 and enlisted in the Israel Defense Forces at 18. He received an early discharge but later volunteered for additional military service and served in the reserves until he was 46. After being discharged he took odd jobs, mostly in central Israel and Eilat. Silman spent several years living in the United States, where he established a delivery business. Upon returning to Israel he established the trucking business "Mika Transportation" in 1994. The company's operations centered on four trucks.

In 2002 Silman was found to owe a 15,000 NIS debt to the National Insurance Institute of Israel, which ballooned dramatically due to late fees. Silman was initially unaware of the debt because he had moved his business during the economic downturn caused by the Second Intifada and the notices were sent to its old address. He did not pay the sum due to a dispute regarding the justification of the billing, so one of his trucks was confiscated by the National Insurance Institute. The truck was sold a year later, after Silman did not pay his debt to the National Insurance Institute. His business subsequently collapsed. As a result, Silman filed a tort claim against the National Insurance Institute, claiming that the institute caused him damages of more than 4.5 million and a foreclosure due to the confiscation of his truck. Silman asked the court to exempt him from paying for the legal procedure but he was refused, after the court's registrar held that "the amount of the claim is absurd, and so is the attempt to link the failures of the National Insurance Institute to the damage caused to applicant." Later on, Silman filed an appeal against the decision to the Supreme Court, but it was refused by the court's registrar on the grounds that Silman must appeal to the district court.

In 2004, Silman attempted to establish a company that manufactured plant pots out of polyester, but this endeavor collapsed as well. He sued the plastic manufacturing company that had been the project's supplier but lost. The judge criticized Silman, stating: "Here is a man, without any experience or professional education, who invented a product that requires complex engineering and training in various engineering fields. He may call himself 'number one in the world in polyester' but still, there is no one responsible for this product from start to finish. Silman is convinced that he was terribly wronged, and he said harsh things to the defendants. 'You ruined my life. Today I was finished completely. This was a dream I worked on for half my life.' This is not a dream, it is a fantasy, and it is a shame that Silman chose to point all his arrows at individuals who actually tried to help him as much as possible in this project."

Following the collapse of his businesses and the repossession of his Jaffa home by a bank, Silman moved in with his mother in Bat Yam in 2005; he worked as a taxi driver. After his mother's death, her apartment was repossessed by the state, as she had signed off on a loan using her home to help him with his debts. Silman began renting his own apartment. He later moved to Haifa to save money. After suffering several strokes and enduring relentless dizzy spells, his driver's license was suspended for medical reasons and he was no longer able to make a living as a taxi driver. He turned to the National Insurance Institute to recognize his disability, but received low disability rates. After the intervention of the Rabbis for Human Rights, in May 2012 he was recognized by the National Insurance Institute as being 100% disabled and began receiving disability payments of 2,300 NIS per month.

His appeals to the Ministry of Housing and Construction for assistance in rent were rejected because he did not meet the criteria necessary for that assistance. In addition, Silman turned to the Israeli state-owned housing company Amidar and requested public housing, but his request was eventually rejected because he did not meet the criteria necessary for that assistance. His appeal to the Department of Social Affairs of the Municipality of Haifa was also rejected, and he was told by the municipality that they could only help him after he ended up on the streets.

MK Orly Levy-Abekasis, chairman of the Lobby for public housing, approached the CEO of the Ministry of Housing, on behalf of Silman. Nevertheless, her appeals were also rejected. The Ministry of Housing said that a special committee would discuss his request again in September, but it declined to provide emergency assistance to prevent him from becoming homeless.

All along Silman made it clear that he would not end up in the streets. At the time of his death, he had been staying in the Haifa apartment of a friend whose lease was due to expire shortly. According to Rabbi Idit Lev of Rabbis for Human Rights, who had been in close contact with Silman, "he had no choices left and was just not ready to live on the streets." Lev also commented that "the irony is that if he had gone to live on the streets just for two or three weeks, then the state would have helped him but he was just too proud, he refused to lose that pride." Silman insisted that, after fulfilling his national duties via his mandatory military service and reserve service, the State of Israel was obligated to help law-abiding citizens in such dire economic and health situations. In the past, Silman did threaten to harm himself, but his threats did not lead the welfare authorities to solve his problems. In response to his threats, the psychiatric commission representative of the National Insurance Institute claimed that those who threaten to commit suicide do not intend to commit suicide, and the Amidar clerk asked him to just not do it at the Amidar offices.

== Social justice activities ==
During the summer of 2011, Silman joined the activities of Israeli social justice protests in the Haifa region. Silman advocated taking a more political and active approach, in contrast to those whom sought to focus the social justice protests only on a change of consciousness within the existing framework. He claimed that the protests must be political, and that this should be reflected in an establishment of a party which would manage to overthrow the government of Benjamin Netanyahu. Silman called for active operations, such as occupying abandoned or unoccupied empty residential apartments as part of the struggle for public housing.

=== Self-immolation ===
Silman set himself on fire during a social justice demonstration held on 14 July 2012. In the suicide letter he passed out before he burnt himself, he accused the state of Israel and the welfare system of failing to treat disadvantaged people in his situation. He blamed Prime Minister Benjamin Netanyahu and the Finance Minister Yuval Steinitz for the economic policy that led him to commit suicide: "I hold the State of Israel, Bibi Netanyahu and Steinitz, the bastards, accountable for the humiliation which the disadvantaged citizens, go through every day, as the rich and the government workers take from the poor." He also blamed various government officials in National Insurance Institute, including the Claims Department Manager and the Registrar of the court in Haifa, for the injustice done to him.

Silman was transferred to the Tel Aviv Sourasky Medical Center, which was the closest to the site in which the self-immolation occurred. This hospital did not include a burn unit, so he was transferred to the Sheba Medical Center. Even once he arrived there, all six beds in the burn unit were occupied and he had to be treated in the general intensive care unit of the hospital.

Moshe Silman died of his injuries on 20 July 2012. He was buried in the Beit kVarot ha-Darom Cemetery in Holon.

== Aftermath ==
Prime Minister Benjamin Netanyahu referred to the event as a "great personal tragedy". Israeli Minister of Education Gideon Sa'ar stated that "the act should remind us all of the everyday hardships of our society and of our individuals, and that we must be sensitive and responsive to the plight of others and assist as much as possible. The important thing is to understand the background of things, to understand the distress from which events such as this could derive and to be sensitive to it."

MK Shelly Yachimovich stated that "suicide is an unusual and shocking answer to difficulties and suffering, but we must not forget the context: the inhumane hardening of the conditions of eligibility for public housing, the unraveling of the social safety net until it has holes so huge that many fall through them to the abyss; and the struggle for survival of small and medium business owners. Silman's fate occurred largely due to the collapse of the welfare state, and the rise of a Darwinian jungle economy."

In the Israeli public discourse, some have compared Moshe Silman to Jan Palach or Mohamed Bouazizi; they see the state leaders (and Benjamin Netanyahu in particular) as responsible for Silman's condition. Others perceive Silman as a person suffering from a mental illness which, in his unfortunate life circumstances, led to a desperate act.

Silman's self-immolation act led to a Werther effect, as a number of other Israelis attempted to commit suicide due to financial distress and emotional despair over the Israeli welfare system. Akiva Mafai, a 45-year-old IDF veteran and wheelchair user, set himself on fire at a bus station and died of his wounds only two days after the death of Silman. On 11 December 2013 a memorial event was held for six people who had immolated themselves in the past year.

The Israeli government established an emergency treatment for extreme cases. Social workers complained that they do not have the tools to deal with the distress of many people beset by the housing shortages and failures of the National Insurance Institute; this may lead to an increase in suicide attempts after the affected realize that social workers cannot help them.

== See also ==
- List of political self-immolations
