= Mehmed Karahyuseinov =

Bulgarian poet (1945–1990)

Mehmed Karahyuseinov (Мехмед Карахюсеинов, Mehmet Hasanov Karahüseyinov)
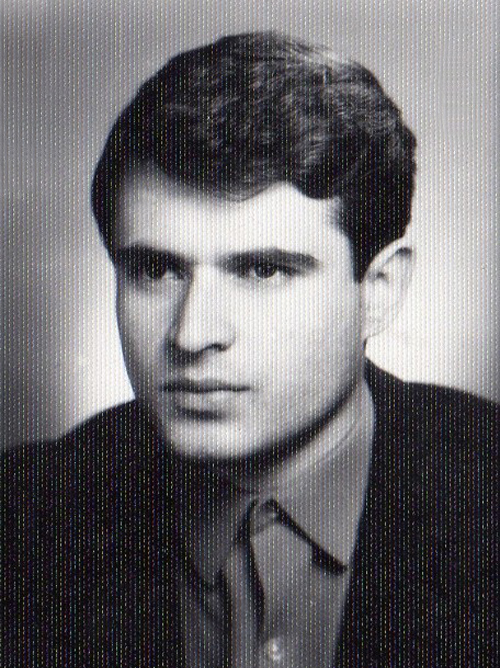
- Mehmed Karahyuseinov at university
- Born: 5 October 1945; Sevar, Kingdom of Bulgaria
- Died: 3 May 1990 (aged 44); Sofia, People's Republic of Bulgaria
- Education: Veliko Tarnovo University
- Occupations: Poet; translator; artist
- Writing career
- Notable works: ◉ Не по ноти Ne po noti (Not by Notes); ◉ Болката на откровението; Bolkata na otkrovenieto; (The Pain of Revelation); ◉ Слухар Sluhar (Eavesdropper)

Mehmed Karahyuseinov (Bulgarian: Мехмед Карахюсеинов, Turkish: Mehmet Hasanov Karahüseyinov, 5 October 1945 – 3 May 1990) was a Bulgarian poet, translator, artist, and dissenter of Turkish and Muslim background. On 2 February 1985, he committed an act of self-immolation in protest against the state policy of the forced assimilation of Turks and Muslims in communist Bulgaria.

== Biography ==
Mehmed Karahyuseinov was born on 5 October 1945 in the then-mixed (Turkish and Bulgarian) village of Sevar, near the town of Kubrat in the Razgrad Province. The village was mainy inhabited by Alevis, and the family also professed this strain of Islam. His father was writer and politician Hasan Hyuseinov Karahyuseinov (Хасан Хюсеинов Карахюсеинов), also known under the pen name Sevarski. In 1985, a new Bulgarianized name was imposed on the father, namely, Asen Sevarski (Асен Севарски). The poet's mother, Zühre Karahuseinova (Зюхре Карахюсеинова), was a homemaker. Mehmed had two siblings, younger sister Nesrin (Несрин) and elder brother Ahmed (Ахмед).

The family spoke Turkish at home and both parents were fully literate in this language. In the mid-1950s, the family moved to the country's capital of Sofia, where the father had been sent, in 1951, by the Bulgarian Communist Party to work in the minority Turkish-language periodical Yeni Işık (New Light, 1945-1985; bilingual, Turkish-Bulgarian after 1969) and mainstream Bulgarian newspapers (for instance, Rabotnichesko delo, Narodna mladezh, Trud). This rapid social advancement was triggered by Sevarski's meeting with the world-famous Turkish communist poet Nâzım Hikmet, who visited Bulgaria in September 1951. The communist authorities took note of Sevarski as an aspiring young Bulgarian Turkish intellectualist and loyal communist. Furthermore, the Bulgarian authorities sought to promote marginalized groups of Muslims (like Alevis) against the Sunni mainstream of Bulgaria's Turks.

Mehmed learned Bulgarian at school. he also finished the capital's so-called Russian Gymnasium, or the prestigious (elite) secondary school with the extended Russian language curriculum in Sofia. At that time, it was the main language of international education and politics across the Soviet bloc. An excellent drawer, Mehmed applied to the National Academy of Art (Национална художествена академия), but without success. Subsequently, he graduated with an MA in Russian philology from Veliko Tarnovo University.

Thanks to the poet's village background, renewed during each summer vacation, Mehmed kept practising his Turkish. What is more, he honed his command of the standard form of this language by reading voraciously Turkish-language books from his father's home library. Meanwhile, during his youth in Sofia, Mehmed became fluent in Bulgarian. Then it was already the family's main language.

In the mid-1960s, Mehmed began to work as a printer and copy editor in the Turkish-language literary monthly Yeni Hayat (New Life, 1954-1985; bilingual, Turkish-Bulgarian, after 1970). For satisfying his artistic aspiration, Mehmed found employment as a stage designer and lighting engineer at the Boyana Cinema Center.

In a way, Mehmed was following in his father's footsteps. In addition to his literary and journalistic work, in 1964, Mehmed's father began working in Radio Sofia. In 1966, Mehmed married his school sweetheart, Shemsie (Шемсие, her name often dimunitivized as Sheri Шери in emulation of the French word chérie for 'darling'). In the same year, their daughter Sevara was born, while the couple's son, Aspar, was born in 1990, a couple of months after the poet's death.

== Career ==
The future poet received education and grew up in Bulgaria, where the Turkish-medium local administration, education, publishing and culture were in full bloom, developed after World War II and guaranteed for the country's Turkish (Muslim) minority, amounting to a tenth of the population. Yet, he entered adult life at the turn of the 1970s, when the authorities rapidly dismantled the system, pushing for full bilingualism in Bulgarian and Turkish. Bulgaria's Turks and Muslims were to be fully Bulgarianized in their language, identity (names) and culture. In the 1980s, monolingualism became the norm, and beginning in 1985, officially no ethnolinguistic minorities remained in Bulgaria. The use of Turkish and of the term 'Turk' was banned. Hence, in the regime's mass media, the country's Turks had to be referred to as 'Bulgarian Mohammedans.' In the winter of 1984-1985, the names of 0.8 million Turks (Muslims) were Bulgarianized by force.

Having proved himself as a translator, journalist and artist, Mehmed began to write poetry in the late 1960s. He wanted to publish his own poems, like his father did. He kept submitting material for as many as three collections of poetry, but the publishing house Narodna Mladezh Nation's Youth sat on these submissions for over three years and did not reply. Through backchannels, Mehmed was informed that, first, he would have to glorify Bulgaria and communism with some poems. Afterward, another requirement was added, namely, to write five poems praising the 'Revival Process,' or the forced assimilation (Bulgarianization) of the country's Turks and Muslims. Mehmed refused because serving propaganda was not a poet's tasks, whereas denying one's own identity and language was a moral and logical impossibility to him.

== Self-Immolation ==
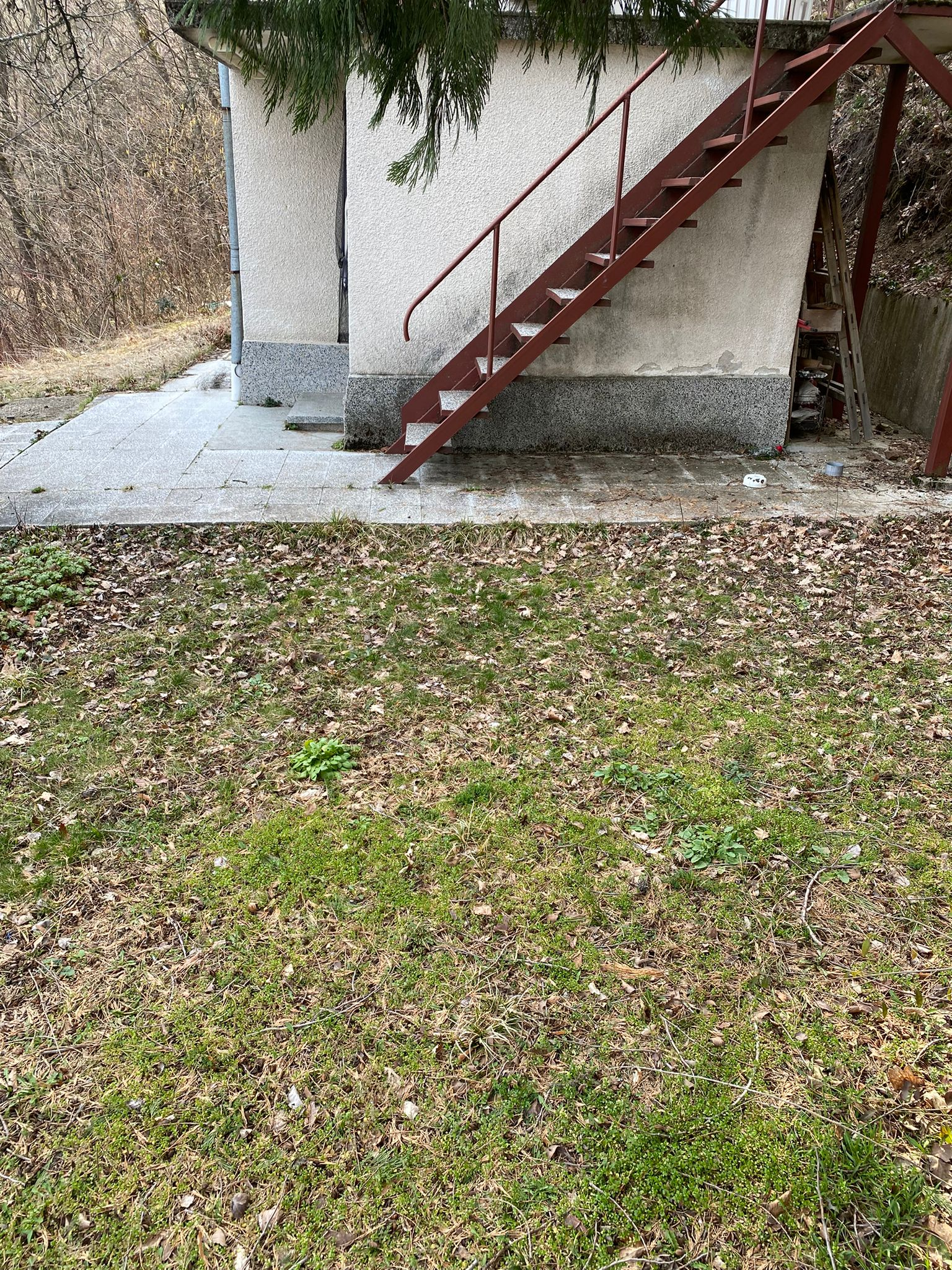
The place where poet Mehmed Karahyuseinov committed self-immolation in 1985

Mehmed's family had a small countryhouse, consisting of one room only, in Люти дол Liuti dol street, district Knyazhevo, at the picturesque feet of Vitosha Mountain in Sofia's sparsely populated south-western periphery. On 28 January 1985, the poet attended a meeting in his workplace's party cell. He was informed that he and his family would need to adopt new names to replace the Turkish ones by the Friday deadline.

On 2 February 1985, the poet left for the countryhouse with a canister of gasoline. His wife Sheri and daughter Sevara were to join him on the following day. Instead, on this fateful Friday, he doused himself with gasoline indoors. Seen by no one, he lit himself in front of the countryhouse. It was snowing heavily. He fell into a snowdrift, which extinguished the flames. Mehmed remained alive. Unable to walk due to the burns, in extreme pain, he crawled for a kilometer to reach a bus stop. A taxi driver who spotted him at the bus stop took Mehmed to Pirogov Hospital downtown.

On Saturday, before leaving for the countryhouse, Sheri with Sevara visited her parents-in-law to ask if Mahmud had phoned as his custom was. Because he had not, they became frightened and rang up Pirogov Hospital. They learned the poet was hospitalized there.

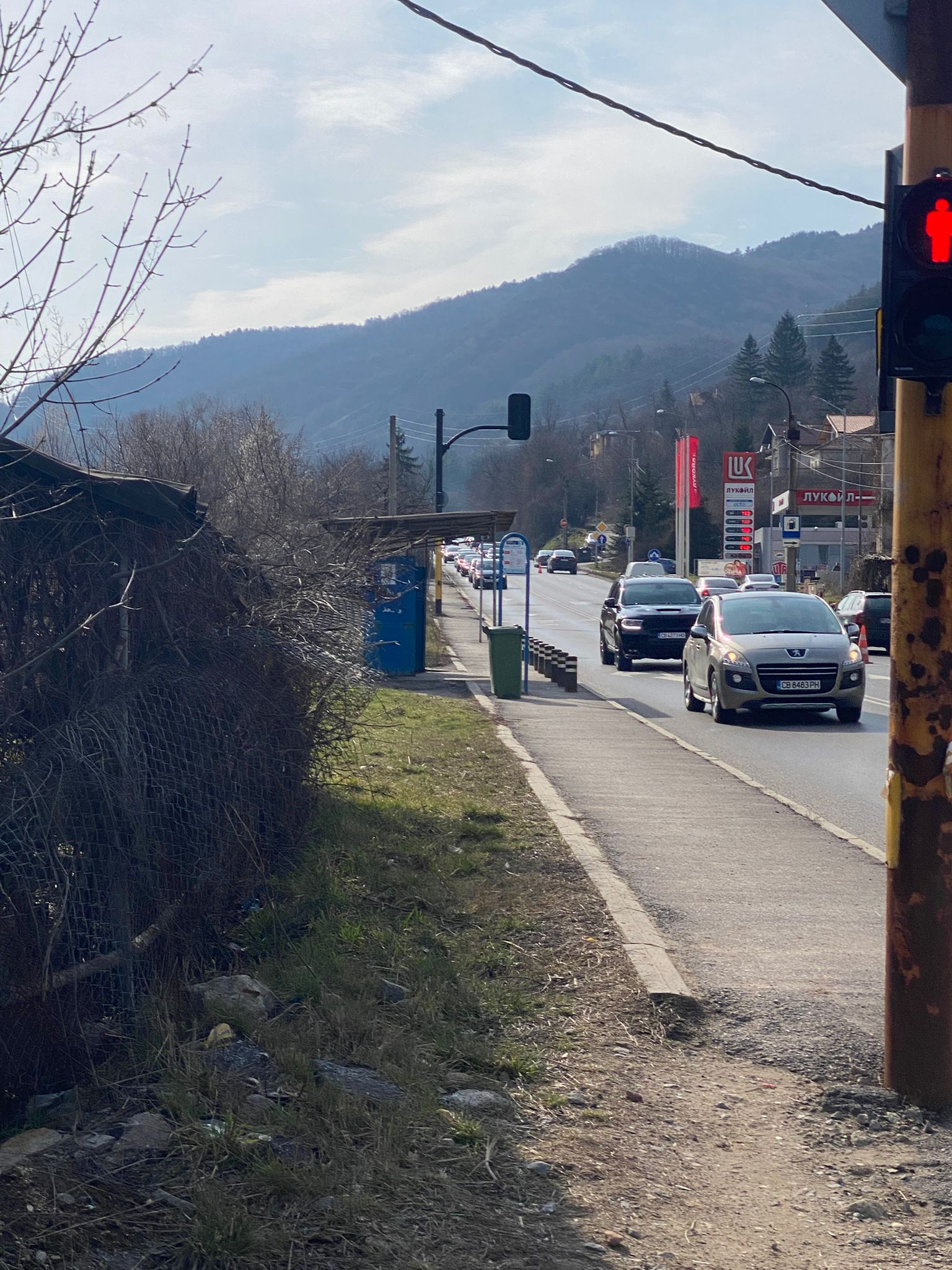
Bus stop from which poet Mehmed Karahyuseinov was rescued after self-immolation in 1985

== Forced name change ==
Mehmed lost consciousness at the hospital entrance. He suffered burns to half of his body's surface. No one believed he would survive. He remained in coma for 20 days. The Bulgarian secret service DS guarded the patient, not allowing his family to visit him. Sheri was then pregnant with their son Aspar. The main objective was to prevent any leak to the international press about Mehmed's solitary and principled protest.

When the poet was in coma, the authorities confiscated his internal passport. Afterward, without Mehmed's consent, they changed his name to Metodi Asenov Karakhanov (Методи Асенов Караханов). Another internal passport was issued in this name.

== Aftermath ==
Bowing to the administrative imposition, nevertheless the poet did not give up. He played on the similarity of his old name Mehmed and his new one Metodi, and in everyday life went by the diminutive Meto (Мето), which in Bulgarian works for both names.

Meanwhile, in July 1985, his father was one of the top signatories in the state-sponsored declaration of the country's intellectuals in support of the campaign of forced name changing. For his unwavering loyalty to the communist authorities and the program of forced assimilation of the country's Turks and Muslims, Asen Sevarski was rewarded with his election to the Bulgarian Parliament for the 1986-1990 term.

Poet Mehmed Karahyuseinov survived but required numerous plastic surgeries. His looks remained off-putting. He put on a brave face but was plagued by ill health. In 1987, Mehmed underwent a lung surgery. He witnessed the 1989 ethnic cleansing of Bulgaria's Turks and Muslims and the end of communism in Bulgaria and across the Soviet bloc. Mehmed died in 1990 of lung cancer.

After Meto's death, his father Asen Sevarski suffered two consecutive strokes, the second of which proved fatal. He died half a year after his son. Not only did he have to witness his son's death but also the bankruptcy of his loyalty to communism and the policy of forced Bulgarianization. In the end, his son's principled stance seized the day. Unfortunately, to this day, the place of his 1985 self-immolation remains without any commemoration.

== Importance ==
Most well-known cases of self-immolation are spectacles, carried out in front of a public. However, it is estimated that at least two-thirds of all self-immolations committed are non-public in their character. Karahyuseinov's case falls into the latter category.

Like, the Bulgarian-Turkish poet, in 1978, Ukrainian Oleksa Hirnyk self-immolated alone to protest against Russification of Soviet Ukraine. Non-public acts of self-immolation were also committed by Crimean Tatar Musa Mamut (1978) and Kurd Mazlum Doğan (1982) against the policies of Russfication and Turkicization, respectively.

Non-public politically-motivated acts of self-immolation by women are rare. On the other hand, such instances may be under-recorded, due to the gender bias, which leads to classifying such cases as related to 'domestic' problems.

Survival after a non-public immolation is rare, but it happens, as for instance, in the cases of Mehdi Darini (2021) and Kazem Alinejad (2024), both recorded in Iran's notorious Evin Prison, Tehran. Unlike in Karahyuseinov's case, penitentiary survaillance under such controlled circumstances played a significant role in the two inmates' survival.

== Bibliography ==
- Стърнище Stırnishte [Stubblefield] (NB: samizdat: 40 copies). 1989.
- Слухар Sluhar [Listener] (NB: samizdat: 11 copies). 1990.
- Не по ноти: Стихове и рисунки Ne po noti: Stihove i risunki [Not by Notes: Poems and Drawings]. 1999. София: Стигмати. ISBN 9549521141, 90pp.
- Поетът, който изгори тялото си, за да съхрани душата си! Poetıt, koito izgori tialoto si, za da sıhrani dushata si [The Poet Who Immolated His Body to Save His Soul!]. 2005. Сопот: Дениз. ISBN 9548486261, 102pp.
- Болката на откровението Bolkata na otkrovenieto [The Pain of Revelation]. 2015. София: Фондация “Мехмед Карахюсеинов–Мето”. ISBN 9786199051009, 160pp.

== Translations ==
- Йоздемир Индже (Özdemir İnce). 1982. Написано върху водата Napisano vırhu vodata [Written on the Water: Poems]. Selected and translated from the Turkish by Hasan Karahuseinov and Mehmed Karahuseinov. София: Народна култура, 92pp.
- Назъм Хикмет (Nâzım Hikmet). 1984. Избрани творби в четири тома Izbrani tvorbi v chetiri toma [Selected Works in Four Volumes]. [NB: one of the volume's translators.) София: Народна култура.
- Йомер Сейфетин (Ömer Seyfettin). 2015. Избрано Izbrano [Collected Poems]. София: ИК Aspirius. (NB: One of the volume's four translators.) ISBN 9786197277005, 352pp.

== See also ==
- Artin Penik
- Ferhat Kurtay
- List of political self-immolations
- Jan Palach
- Mazlum Doğan
- Musa Mamut
- Oleksa Hirnyk
- Self-immolation protests by Tibetans in China
- Self-immolations in Bulgaria (2013-2015)
- Ryszard Siwiec
- Piotr Szczęsny
