= Albert Razin =

Udmurt activist and Neopagan (1940–2019)

- Альберт Разин
- Born: 12 June 1940; Kuzyumovo, Udmurt ASSR, Russian SFSR, Soviet Union
- Died: 10 September 2019 (aged 79); Izhevsk, Udmurtia, Russia
- Cause of death: Burns from self-immolation
- Occupations: Neopaganist, Udmurt language rights activist, sociologist, ethnographer
- Awards: Honorary citizen of the Alnashsky District; Trokay Borisov Award; Honorary scientist of the Republic of Udmurtia

Albert Alexeyevich Razin (Udmurt: Альберт Алексеевич Разин, 12 June 1940 – 10 September 2019) was an Udmurt language rights activist and Neopaganist who committed traditional self-immolation (tipshar) in the centre of Izhevsk as an act of protest against the adoption of a bill on the voluntary study of the national languages of native peoples, which would allow Udmurt schoolchildren to choose for themselves which language to study, but could lead to a decrease in the number of speakers of the Udmurt language.

== Biography ==
Albert Razin was born into a peasant family in Alnashsky District of modern-day Udmurtia.

In 1962 he graduated from the Udmurt State Pedagogical University. He later became Candidate of Sciences in philosophy. In the early 1990s, Razin led an institute at the Udmurt State University.

Razin was an activist of the Udmurt national movement and was actively engaged in the protection of the Udmurt language. Together with other activists, he issued numerous formal protests against the Russification policies of the federal government, such as the cancellation of obligatory teaching of minority languages at schools. He was also known as an active revivalist of Udmurt traditions and Udmurt neopaganism.

== Self-immolation ==
On 10 September 2019 Albert Razin came out in front of the State Council of Udmurtia in the Udmurt capital city of Izhevsk together with fellow Udmurt language activist Andrey Perevozchikov. Razin was holding two posters written in Russian, one saying "If my language dies tomorrow, then I'm ready to die today" (a quote from Rasul Gamzatov, an Avar poet) and "Do I have a Fatherland?". He then doused himself in petrol and set himself on fire. Perevozchikov, unaware of Razin's intentions, attempted to extinguish the flames using a fire extinguisher from the Council building, but the extinguisher turned out to be faulty. Razin was brought to a hospital in a critical condition, with burns to nearly 100 percent of his body, and died several hours later.

The Udmurt State Council postponed its session following the incident.

Linguistic rights activists from several regions of Russia (Chuvashia, Bashkortostan and others) as well as academics and officials from Finland and Estonia and Human Rights Watch expressed their solidarity with Razin's demands.

== Family ==
Razin was survived by a wife and an 18-year-old daughter.

== See also ==
- Vasyl Makukh
- Romas Kalanta
