= Qualification-based wage for life =

Mode of remuneration introduced by Bernard Friot

The "wage for life" (salaire à vie) or "individual qualification-based wage" (salaire à la qualification personnelle) refers to a form of remuneration proposed by Bernard Friot and the French popular education non-profit Réseau Salariat. At its core is the distinction between work and employment. Publicly funded using social contributions, it would be the building block for a new mode of socioeconomic system.

== Description ==
The qualification-based wage for life consists in paying every citizen a wage by socialising wealth through social contributions (cotisations sociales in French).

According to this conception of economic value, every citizen is entitled to a wage for life that is attached to an irrevocable level of qualification. This theory advocates a new common definition of work that clearly diverges from employment.

Such a wage would not be tied to a particular post—owned by an employer—but to a political status of value-producing individuals. Incidentally, this would enable to clearly identify, in the GDP, the value produced by workers presently considered as unproductive such as house workers, retired workers, unemployed people, volunteers, and students.

It is therefore a profound challenge and alternative to the capitalist logic concerning the fundamental relationship between work and remuneration: instead of paying someone after they have realised a certain number of subordinated tasks for a capitalist or company owner, citizens are paid first as a precondition to then be able to work freely.

=== Current existence in the French economy ===
According to Bernard Friot, a third of French citizen aged 18 or more already receive a wage based on their qualification rather than their employment status, and are thus, to different degrees, freed from the labour market or market for capitalist goods and services.

This fraction includes civil servants (5.5 millions in 2017), retired people (7.5 millions receiving a lifelong pension greater than 75% of their last wage), self-employed health professionals, employees from various formerly nationalised companies—SNCF; IEG; Orange; La Poste—and finally employees who benefit from a minimum wage negotiated through a branch agreement.

== Profit-based vs use-based ownership of the means of production ==
According to this economic model, the wage for life directly challenges the notion of profit-making private ownership of the means of production in favour of the notion of co-ownership of use.

=== Profit-based ownership ===
Profit-based (or "lucrative") ownership refers to the right to profit or generate an income from private capital, whatever it may be (work tools, pecuniary capital, stock market shares, real estate, rented cars, etc.)

=== Use-based ownership ===
Use-based ownership refers to an asset that is consumed for personal use and from which no income is derived: a house, a car, a work tool, savings for use...etc.

In this model, workers would collaboratively own the means of production and be paid in a socialised manner by a fund of social contributions that all production collectives would feed. The notion of individual qualification would thus be accompanied by the end of the exercise of profit-based private ownership of the means of production while generalising use-based ownership.

== Notion of qualification ==
The notion of individual qualification (qualification personnelle) needs to be distinguished from that of a mere certification, because in such a system the qualification would imply a compulsory remuneration from the employer, fixed by the collective agreements of a branch. Having a diploma does not necessarily guarantee access to a wage. Instead it provides the legitimacy to claim a post on the labour market.

Individual qualifications aim at granting irrevocable levels following the model of the current French civil service. Thus, according to a democratically chosen wage scale, wage progression would take place through a grade increase throughout an individual's career.

== Critiques ==
Multiple objections have been raised against the qualification-based wage for life. These are often similar critiques to those initially formulated against the idea of universal basic income, and thought by their authors to be equally applicable in that case.

=== Moral objections ===
Some objections may be of a moral nature, requiring the definition of a standard discerning contribution from idleness, or related to a certain conception of justice: should we remunerate an activity that "does not contribute" to production such as voluntary work? Does this not break the social contract that binds individuals according to a logic of cooperation?

==== Answer to moral objections ====
The French economist Frédéric Lordon, drawing on Spinoza's theory of value, points out that Bernard Friot's contribution is precisely to demoralise the notions of economic value and work. He does that by shifting the focus from the economic value of things produced to the individuals who make them, a priori and unconditionally. Freed for the constraints of the labour market, people will continue to produce effects, effects whose objective measurement is fundamentally impossible. Thereby, it removes contributivity and its moral dimension from work itself:

Tout est contribution, donc, plus rien n'appelle d'être regardé comme contribution ... et nous sortons de la morale de la contribution. English translation: "Everything is contribution, therefore nothing calls for being seen as contribution... and we so leave the morality of contribution."

=== Economic objections ===
Other objections have an economic motive, concerning the mode of funding for the qualification-based wage or its real transformation of the social relations of capitalism.
