= Bernard Friot =

French sociologist

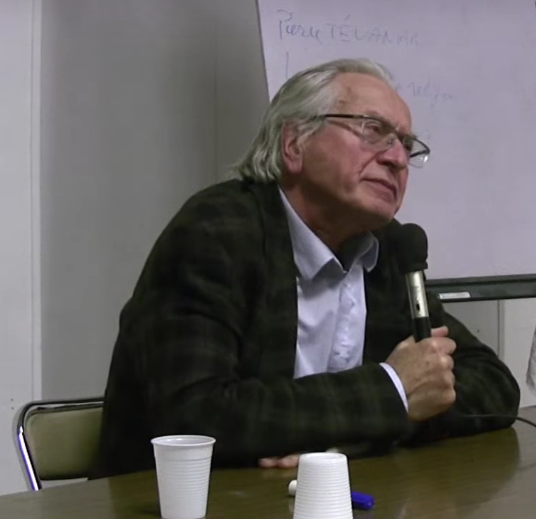
- Born: June 16, 1946 (age 79); Neufchâteau

Academic work
- Main interests: Political economy, sociology of monetary resources, financing of social protection, trade unionism, social Europe

Bernard Friot is a French sociologist and economist. He is (since 2009) an emeritus professor of Sociology, and previously taught at Paris West University Nanterre La Défense.

He's been a member of the French Communist Party (PCF) since 1970.

He began his academic career in 1971 at the University Institutes of Technology of the University of Lorraine as an assistant and then as a lecturer in economics. His economics PhD thesis relates to the building up of the French social security system between 1920 and 1980. He challenges the interpretation that makes the 1945 Social Security a necessary element of the Fordist era of capitalism. He insists instead on the "anti-capitalist nature of the institutions of socialization of wages".

He leads the European Institute of Wages and a popular education association called Réseau Salariat, which promotes the idea of a "qualification-based wage for life" (salaire à la qualification personnelle) as an alternative proposal to the basic income - an idea denounced by Friot as "the spare wheel of capitalism".

His research focuses on the sociology of wages and comparing social protection systems in Europe. His work has also focused on pensions, going against the French government's proposed reforms in 2010. The living wage supported by Bernard Friot is, according to his analyse, the best subversive answer to the four main institutions of capitalism : lucrative property (not private property, only private property where profit is taken from), credit (a state does not need to borrow to finance investment), employment market (the central base of capitalism causing the blackmail to unemployment), the assessing of economic value according to the duration of working. To be fully understood, Bernard Friot developed through Reseau Salariat many tutoring videos. His goal is to show the "dejà-là", meaning the actual waging by socialized value in the French economic system via the social security, the public employment, etc.

During the 2023 French pension reform unrest, L'Obs considered Bernard Friot as a key figure in the pension debate.

== Bibliography ==
- Le communisme qui vient (with Bernard Vasseur), October 2024, ed. La Dispute
- Prenons le pouvoir sur nos retraites, 2023, ed. La Dispute
- Retraites : généraliser le droit au salaire (with Nicolas Castel), 2022, Les Éditions du Croquant
- En travail. Conversations sur le communisme (with Frederic Lordon), 2021, ed. La Dispute
- Vaincre Macron, 2017, ed. La Dispute
- Émanciper le travail - Entretiens avec Patrick Zech, 2014, Éditions La Dispute
- The Wage under Attack: Employment Policies in Europe (with Bernadette Clasquin), 2013, PIE-Peter Lang
- Puissances du salariat, new expanded edition, 2012, ed. La Dispute (pocket edition, with new introduction, 2021)
- L’Enjeu du salaire, 2012, ed. La Dispute
- Comprendre l’écologie politique, UFAL, 2012, chap. 7: "Pour une citoyenneté révolutionnaire" (interview)
- L’Enjeu des retraites, 2010, ed. La Dispute
- Wage and Welfare (with Bernadette Clasquin, Nathalie Moncel and Mark Harvey), 2004, PIE-Peter Lang
- Et la cotisation sociale créera l’emploi, 1999, ed. La Dispute
- La Construction sociale de l’emploi en France, des années 1960 à aujourd'hui (with José Rose), 1996, ed. L’Harmattan
