= Vasyl Makukh =

Ukrainian nationalist activist (1927-1968)

- Василь Макух
- Born: 14 November 1927; Kariv, Lwów Voivodeship, Second Polish Republic
- Died: 6 November 1968 (aged 40); Kyiv, Ukrainian SSR, USSR
- Known for: Self-immolation in protest of Soviet policies in Ukraine and Czechoslovakia

Vasyl Omelianovych Makukh (Ukrainian: Василь Омелянович Макух; 14 November 1927 – 6 November 1968) was a Ukrainian dissident and political prisoner, who committed self-immolation in protest against the Warsaw Pact invasion of Czechoslovakia.

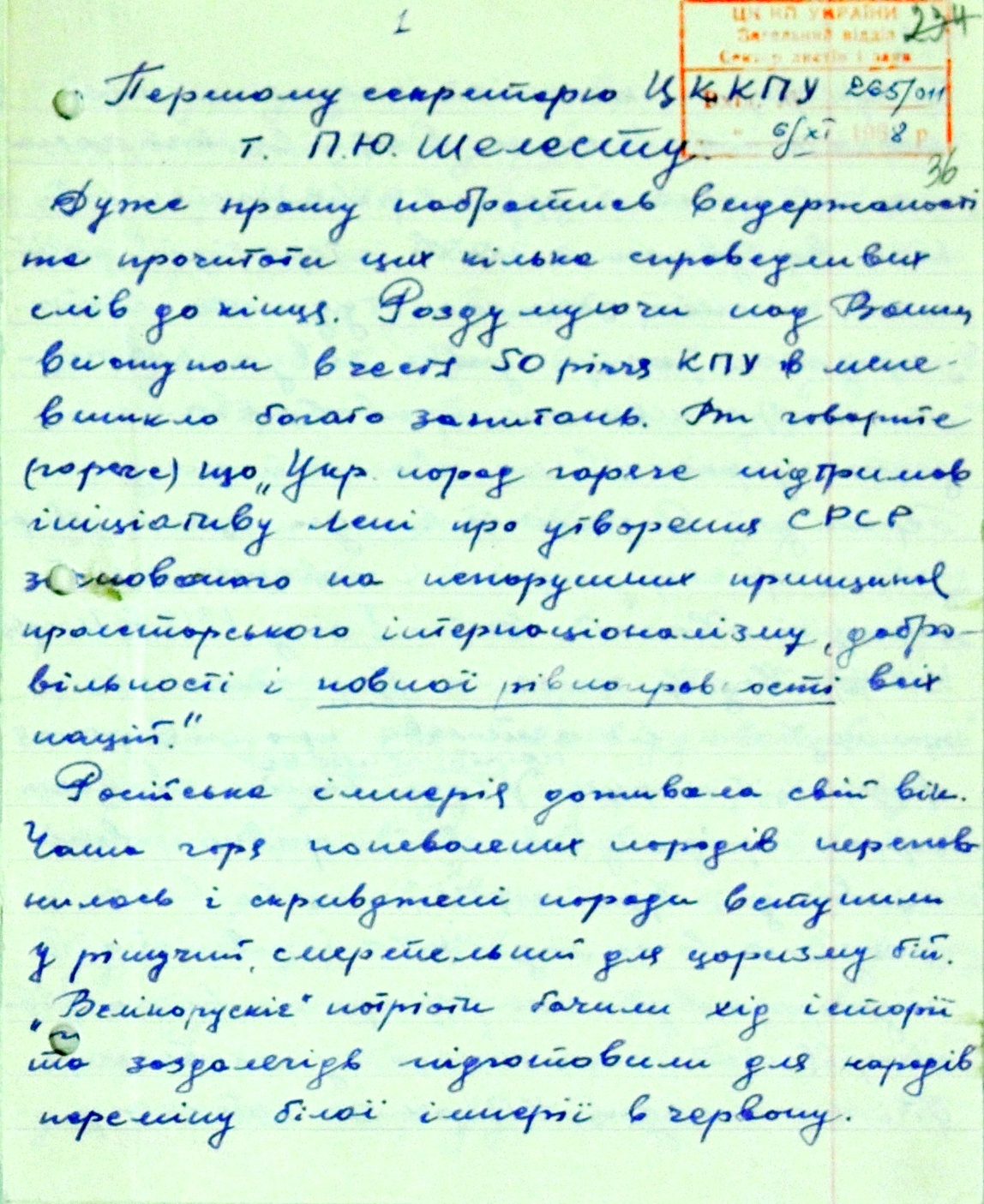
A letter to Ukrainian Communist leader Petro Shelest, sent by Makukh in advance to his self-immolation

== Biography ==
=== Early life and military career ===
Vasyl Makukh was born to a big family in the village of Kariv, now part of Sheptytskyi Raion, Lviv Oblast. After graduating from primary school, he worked at the manor of a local landowner, and assisted the Greek Catholic parish priest.

Having been conscripted into the Red Army, in November 1944, Makukh defected and joined the nationalist Ukrainian Insurgent Army. He served in the organization's military intelligence, acting under pseudonyms Mykola and Spivak. In February 1946, he was wounded and captured after a shootout with Soviet and Polish border guards at the Soviet-Polish border (today Poland–Ukraine border).

=== Arrest, imprisonment and life in exile ===
On 15 February 1946, Makukh was taken to the district precinct of the Soviet Ministry of Internal Affairs in Velyki Mosty and later to Lviv Prison No. 4 (known as "Brygidki"). On 11 July 1946, the Military Tribunal of Lviv garrison sentenced him to 10 years of hard labour (katorga) with five years of detention ("civil rights restriction") plus the confiscation of all his property. Makukh served his sentence in Dubravlag (Mordovia) and other GULAG camps in Siberia.

On 18 July 1955, Makukh was freed and exiled to a local settlement, where he met a woman who had also served 10 years imprisonment. In 1956, both managed to return to Ukraine, and being forbidden to return to their own region, they settled in Dnipropetrovsk (today Dnipro), where they married. After graduating from an evening school, Makukh enlisted into the local university, but was expelled due to his Ukrainian patriotism. In the aftermath, Makukh worked as a schoolteacher.

=== Self-immolation and reactions ===
Memorial plaque at the site of Makukh's self-immolation in Kyiv

After visiting his sister in Lviv Oblast in October 1968, Makukh did not return to Dnipropetrovsk, and went to Kyiv instead. On November 5, 1968, on the eve of the anniversary of October Revolution, he committed suicide by self-immolation on Khreshchatyk, Kyiv's main street, in protest against the Soviet rule of Ukraine, russification and the Soviet invasion in Czechoslovakia. Before his death, Makukh shouted 'Long live free Ukraine!' He died the next day.

Makukh's self-immolation was kept secret from the Ukrainian public by official media, but information about it soon became known through accounts of personal witnesses and was reported by Radio Freedom and Voice of America. Despite this, public reaction to the event was insignificant; according to Lyudmila Alexeyeva, this resulted from a general atmosphere of depression and fatigue in society of the time as a result of preceding repressions.

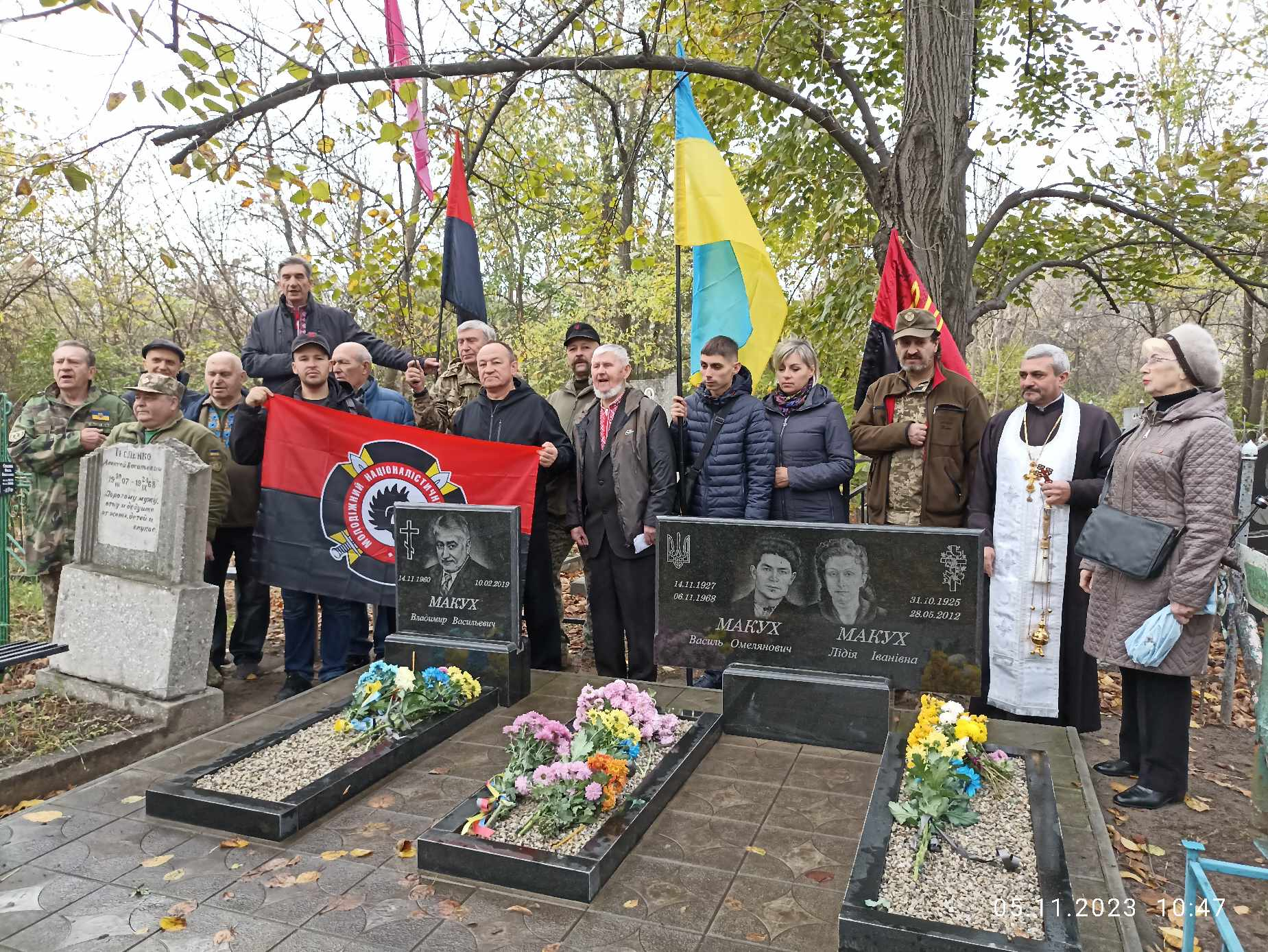
Grave of Vasyl Makukh, his wife and their son in Dnipro

On 6 November 1968 the prosecutor's office of the Leninsky District of Kyiv city opened a criminal case against him because of the suicide, the outcome of which was never made known. Makukh's ashes were buried on the Klochko Cemetery in Dnipropetrovsk. The burial was overseen by KGB agents, who took photographs of all visitors to Makukh's grave. Makukh's widow was subjected to intense questioning by security officials, and lost her job after being unable to provide the list of her husband's contacts. His sister was also questioned, allegedly with the use of torture, which could have led to her premature death.

== Family ==
Makukh's wife Lidiya was a fellow prisoner of Soviet prison camps. Their marriage produced 2 children: Volodymyr and Olha.

== Commemoration ==
A documentary film and several publications were dedicated to Makukh, and a memorial plaque in his honour has been placed in his native village. In 2006 the All-Ukrainian Society of Political Prisoners issued a petition to president Viktor Yushchenko to award Makukh with the title Hero of Ukraine, but it was ignored.

On the 40th anniversary of Makukh's self-immolation in 2008, a requiem concert took place on Maidan Nezalezhnosti. On the same day, an exhibition dedicated to Makukh and fellow activist Oleksa Hirnyk was opened at the Smoloskyp Museum in Donetsk; in 2014 the building was captured by militants of the Donetsk People's Republic, and the fate of the exhibition has since then been unknown.

In January 2017, a memorial plaque was installed on the site of Makukh's self-immolation in Khreshchatyk. On the 50th anniversary of Makukh's death, a pedestrian bridge in the Vršovice district of Prague was named in his honour.

One of the streets in Dnipro, Ukraine bears the name of Vasyl Makukh. In 2019 a street in Shevchenkiskyi Raion of Kyiv was named after Makukh.

== See also ==
- Oleksa Hirnyk
- Romas Kalanta
- Ryszard Siwiec
- Jan Palach
- Jan Zajíc
- Evžen Plocek
- Albert Razin
