= 1965 in the United States =

- Decades: 1940s; 1950s; 1960s; 1970s; 1980s
- See also: History of the United States (1964–1980); Timeline of United States history (1950–1969); List of years in the United States

Events from the year 1965 in the United States.

== Incumbents ==
=== Federal government ===
- President: Lyndon B. Johnson (D-Texas)
- Vice President:

vacant (until January 20)
Hubert Humphrey (D-Minnesota) (starting January 20)

- Chief Justice: Earl Warren (California)
- Speaker of the House of Representatives: John William McCormack (D-Massachusetts)
- Senate Majority Leader: Mike Mansfield (D-Montana)
- Congress: 88th (until January 3), 89th (starting January 3)

==== State governments ====
Governors and lieutenant governors

=== Governors ===
- Governor of Alabama: George Wallace (Democratic)
- Governor of Alaska: William A. Egan (Democratic)
- Governor of Arizona: Paul Fannin (Republican) (until January 4), Samuel Pearson Goddard Jr. (Democratic) (starting January 4)
- Governor of Arkansas: Orval Faubus (Democratic)
- Governor of California: Pat Brown (Democratic)
- Governor of Colorado: John Arthur Love (Republican)
- Governor of Connecticut: John N. Dempsey (Democratic)
- Governor of Delaware: Elbert N. Carvel (Democratic) (until January 19), Charles L. Terry Jr. (Democratic) (starting January 19)
- Governor of Florida: C. Farris Bryant (Democratic) (until January 5), W. Haydon Burns (Democratic) (starting January 5)
- Governor of Georgia: Carl E. Sanders (Democratic)
- Governor of Hawaii: John A. Burns (Democratic)
- Governor of Idaho: Robert E. Smylie (Republican)
- Governor of Illinois: Otto Kerner Jr. (Democratic)
- Governor of Indiana: Matthew E. Welsh (Democratic) (until January 11), Roger D. Branigin (Democratic) (starting January 11)
- Governor of Iowa: Harold E. Hughes (Democratic)
- Governor of Kansas: John Anderson Jr. (Republican) (until January 11), William H. Avery (Republican) (starting January 11)
- Governor of Kentucky: Edward T. Breathitt (Democratic)
- Governor of Louisiana: John J. McKeithen (Democratic)
- Governor of Maine: John H. Reed (Republican)
- Governor of Maryland: J. Millard Tawes (Democratic)
- Governor of Massachusetts: Endicott Peabody (Democratic) (until January 7), John A. Volpe (Republican) (starting January 7)
- Governor of Michigan: George W. Romney (Republican)
- Governor of Minnesota: Karl F. Rolvaag (Democratic)
- Governor of Mississippi: Paul B. Johnson Jr. (Democratic)
- Governor of Missouri: John M. Dalton (Democratic) (until January 11), Warren E. Hearnes (Democratic) (starting January 11)
- Governor of Montana: Tim M. Babcock (Republican)
- Governor of Nebraska: Frank B. Morrison (Democratic)
- Governor of Nevada: Grant Sawyer (Democratic)
- Governor of New Hampshire: John W. King (Democratic)
- Governor of New Jersey: Richard J. Hughes (Democratic)
- Governor of New Mexico: Jack M. Campbell (Democratic)
- Governor of New York: Nelson Rockefeller (Republican)
- Governor of North Carolina: Terry Sanford (Democratic) (until January 8), Dan K. Moore (Democratic) (starting January 8)
- Governor of North Dakota: William L. Guy (Democratic)
- Governor of Ohio: Jim Rhodes (Republican)
- Governor of Oklahoma: Henry Bellmon (Republican)
- Governor of Oregon: Mark Hatfield (Republican)
- Governor of Pennsylvania: William Scranton (Republican)
- Governor of Rhode Island: John Chafee (Republican)
- Governor of South Carolina: Donald S. Russell (Democratic) (until April 22), Robert Evander McNair (Democratic) (starting April 22)
- Governor of South Dakota: Archie M. Gubbrud (Republican) (until January 5), Nils Boe (Republican) (starting January 5)
- Governor of Tennessee: Frank G. Clement (Democratic)
- Governor of Texas: John Connally (Democratic)
- Governor of Utah: George Dewey Clyde (Republican) (until January 4), Cal Rampton (Democratic) (starting January 4)
- Governor of Vermont: Philip H. Hoff (Democratic)
- Governor of Virginia: Albertis S. Harrison Jr. (Democratic)
- Governor of Washington: Albert D. Rosellini (Democratic) (until January 13), Daniel J. Evans (Republican) (starting January 13)
- Governor of West Virginia: William Wallace Barron (Democratic) (until January 18), Hulett C. Smith (Democratic) (starting January 18)
- Governor of Wisconsin: John W. Reynolds Jr. (Democratic) (until January 4), Warren P. Knowles (Republican) (starting January 4)
- Governor of Wyoming: Clifford P. Hansen (Republican)

=== Lieutenant governors ===
- Lieutenant Governor of Alabama: James B. Allen (Democratic)
- Lieutenant Governor of Alaska: Hugh Wade (Democratic)
- Lieutenant Governor of Arkansas: Nathan Green Gordon (Democratic)
- Lieutenant Governor of California: Glenn Malcolm Anderson (Democratic)
- Lieutenant Governor of Colorado: Robert Lee Knous (Democratic)
- Lieutenant Governor of Connecticut: Samuel J. Tedesco (Democratic)
- Lieutenant Governor of Delaware: Eugene Lammot (Democratic) (until January 19), Sherman W. Tribbitt (Democratic) (starting January 19)
- Lieutenant Governor of Georgia: Peter Zack Geer (Democratic)
- Lieutenant Governor of Hawaii: William S. Richardson (Democratic)
- Lieutenant Governor of Idaho: William Drevlow (Democratic)
- Lieutenant Governor of Illinois: Samuel H. Shapiro (Democratic)
- Lieutenant Governor of Indiana: Richard O. Ristine (Republican) (until January 11), Robert L. Rock (Democratic) (starting January 11)
- Lieutenant Governor of Iowa: W. L. Mooty (Democratic) (until January 17), Robert D. Fulton (Democratic) (starting January 17)
- Lieutenant Governor of Kansas: Harold H. Chase (Republican) (until January 11), John Crutcher (Republican) (starting January 11)
- Lieutenant Governor of Kentucky: Harry Lee Waterfield (Democratic)
- Lieutenant Governor of Louisiana: C. C. Aycock (Democratic)
- Lieutenant Governor of Massachusetts: Francis X. Bellotti (Democratic) (until January 7), Elliot Richardson (Republican) (starting January 7)
- Lieutenant Governor of Michigan: T. John Lesinski (Democratic) (until January 1), William G. Milliken (Republican) (starting January 1)
- Lieutenant Governor of Minnesota: Alexander M. Keith (Democratic)
- Lieutenant Governor of Mississippi: Carroll Gartin (Democratic)
- Lieutenant Governor of Missouri: Hilary A. Bush (Democratic) (until January 11), Thomas Eagleton (Democratic) (starting January 11)
- Lieutenant Governor of Montana: David F. James (Democratic) (until month and day unknown), Ted James (Republican) (starting month and day unknown)
- Lieutenant Governor of Nebraska: Dwight Burney (Republican) (until January 7), Philip Sorensen (Democratic) (starting January 7)
- Lieutenant Governor of Nevada: Paul Laxalt (Republican)
- Lieutenant Governor of New Mexico: Mack Easley (Democratic)
- Lieutenant Governor of New York: Malcolm Wilson (Republican)
- Lieutenant Governor of North Carolina: vacant (until January 8), Robert W. Scott (Democratic) (starting January 8)
- Lieutenant Governor of North Dakota: Frank A. Wenstrom (Republican) (until month and day unknown), Charles Tighe (Democratic) (starting month and day unknown)
- Lieutenant Governor of Ohio: John William Brown (Republican)
- Lieutenant Governor of Oklahoma: Leo Winters (Democratic)
- Lieutenant Governor of Pennsylvania: Raymond P. Shafer (Republican)
- Lieutenant Governor of Rhode Island: Edward P. Gallogly (Democratic) (until month and day unknown), Giovanni Folcarelli (Democratic) (starting month and day unknown)
- Lieutenant Governor of South Carolina: Robert Evander McNair (Democratic) (until April 22), vacant (starting April 22)
- Lieutenant Governor of South Dakota: Nils Boe (Republican) (until January 5), Lem Overpeck (Republican) (starting January 5)
- Lieutenant Governor of Tennessee: James L. Bomar Jr. (Democratic) (until month and day unknown), Jared Maddux (Democratic) (starting month and day unknown)
- Lieutenant Governor of Texas: Preston Smith (Democratic)
- Lieutenant Governor of Vermont: Ralph A. Foote (Republican) (until month and day unknown), John J. Daley (Democratic) (starting month and day unknown)
- Lieutenant Governor of Virginia: Mills E. Godwin Jr. (Democratic)
- Lieutenant Governor of Washington: John Cherberg (Democratic)
- Lieutenant Governor of Wisconsin: Jack B. Olson (Republican) (until January 4), Patrick J. Lucey (Democratic) (starting January 4)

== Events ==
=== January ===
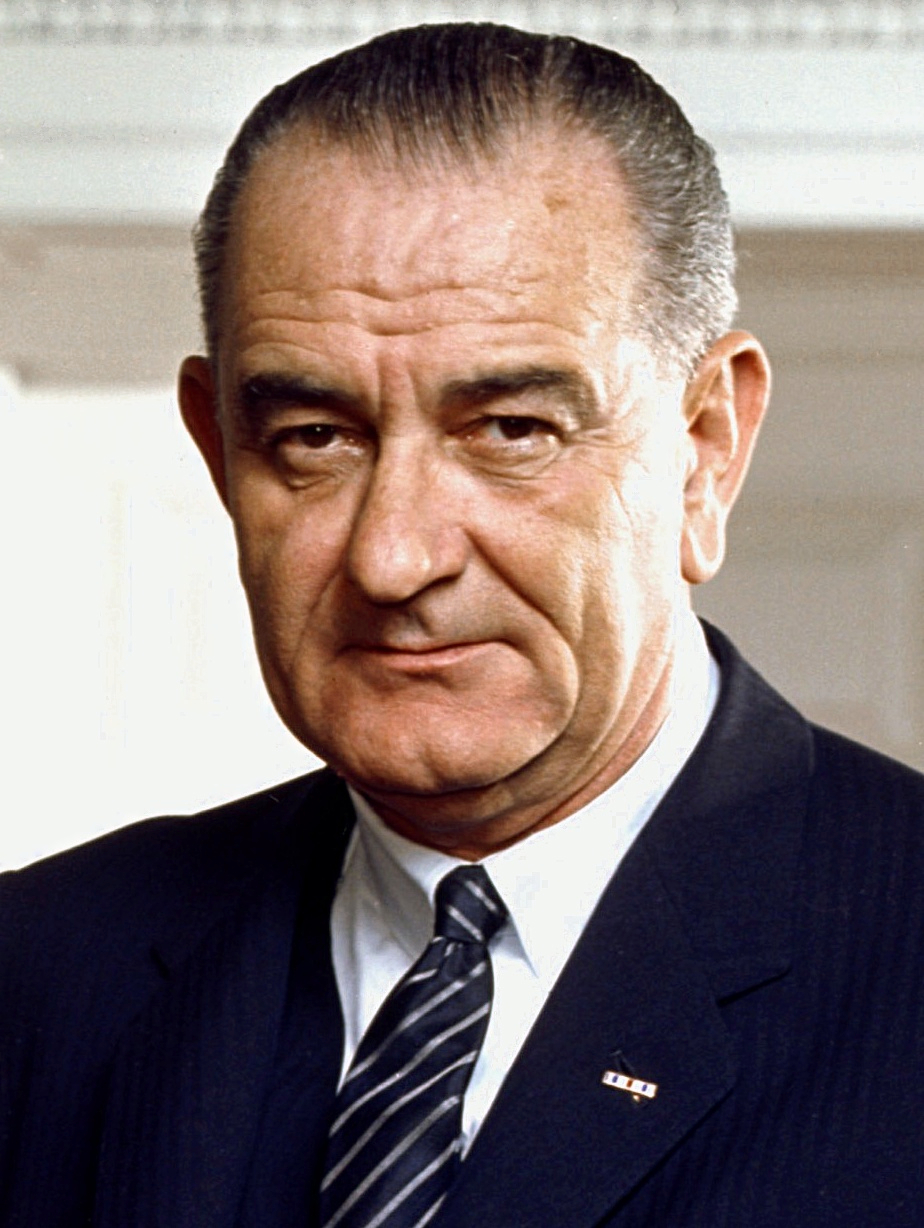
January 20: Lyndon B. Johnson, the 36th president of the United States, begins his full term

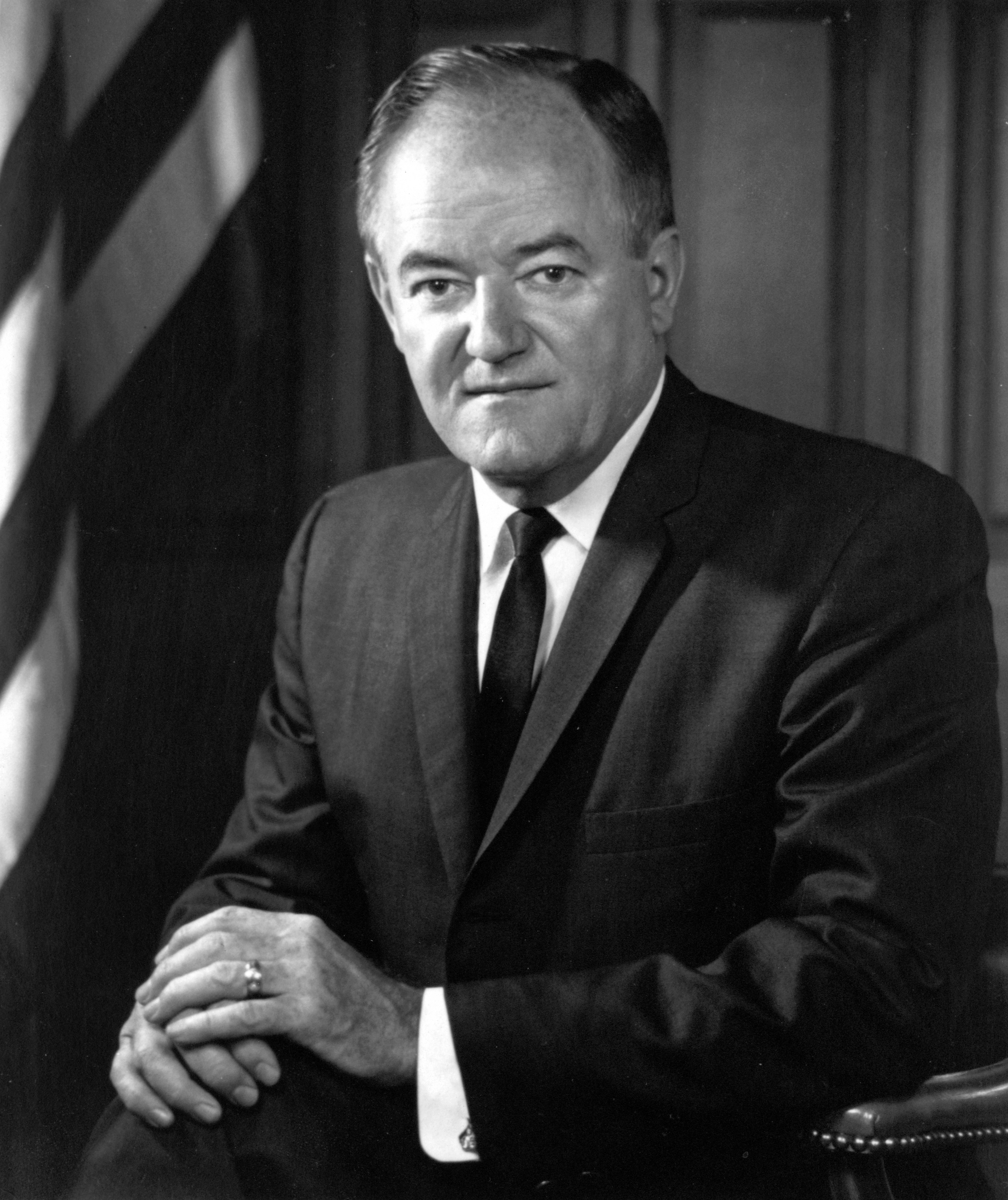
Hubert Humphrey becomes the 38th U.S. vice president

- January 1 – The ship S.S. Catala is driven onto the beach in Ocean Shores, Washington, stranding her.
- January 4 – President Lyndon B. Johnson proclaims his "Great Society" during his State of the Union Address.
- January 19 – The uncrewed Gemini 2 is launched on a suborbital test of various spacecraft systems.
- January 20 – President Lyndon B. Johnson begins his full term. Hubert Humphrey is sworn in as Vice President of the United States.

=== February ===
- February 3 – The 8.7 M_{w} Rat Islands earthquake hits southwest Alaska with a maximum Mercalli intensity of VI (Strong), causing a tsunami that was destructive at Amchitka.
- February 20 – Ranger 8 crashes into the Moon, after a successful mission of photographing possible landing sites for the Apollo program astronauts.
- February 21 – Malcolm X is assassinated by three members of the Nation of Islam in Manhattan.
- February 22 – A new, revised, color production of Rodgers and Hammerstein's Cinderella airs on CBS. Lesley Ann Warren makes her TV debut in the title role. The show becomes an annual tradition.

=== March ===
- March 2 – The Sound of Music premieres at the Rivoli Theater in New York City.
- March 7 – Bloody Sunday: Some 200 Alabama State Troopers clash with 525 civil rights demonstrators in Selma, Alabama who were attempting to march down the highway to Montgomery. No one was killed in the clash.
- March 8 – Vietnam War: Some 3,500 United States Marines arrive in South Vietnam, becoming the first American combat troops in Vietnam.
- March 9 – The second attempt to march from Selma to Montgomery, Alabama, under the leadership of Martin Luther King Jr., stops at the bridge that was the site of Bloody Sunday, to hold a prayer service and return to Selma, in obedience to a court restraining order. White supremacists beat up white Unitarian Universalist minister James J. Reeb later that day in Selma.
- March 11 – White Unitarian Universalist minister James J. Reeb, beaten by white supremacists in Selma, Alabama on March 9 following the second march from Selma, dies in a hospital in Birmingham, Alabama.
- March 15 – President Lyndon B. Johnson makes his "We Shall Overcome" speech.
- March 16 – Police clash with 600 marchers from the Student Nonviolent Coordinating Committee (SNCC) in Montgomery, Alabama.
- March 17
  - In Montgomery, Alabama, 1,600 civil rights marchers demonstrate at the Courthouse.
  - In response to the events of March 7 and 9 in Selma, Alabama, President Johnson sends a bill to Congress that forms the basis for the Voting Rights Act of 1965. It is passed by the Senate on May 26, the House on July 10, and signed into law by President Johnson on August 6.
- March 18 – A United States federal judge rules that the Southern Christian Leadership Conference (SCLC) has the lawful right to march to Montgomery, Alabama to petition for 'redress of grievances'.
- March 19 – The wreck of the SS Georgiana, reputed to have been the most powerful Confederate cruiser ever built and owned by the real Rhett Butler, is discovered off the Isle of Palms, South Carolina. It is discovered by teenage diver E. Lee Spence exactly 102 years after she was sunk with a million-dollar cargo while attempting to run past the Union blockade into Charleston.
- March 21
  - Ranger program: NASA launches Ranger 9, which is the last in a series of uncrewed lunar space probes.
  - Martin Luther King Jr. leads 3,200 civil rights activists in the third march from Selma, Alabama, to the capital in Montgomery.
- March 23 – Gemini 3: NASA launches the United States' first 2-person crew (Gus Grissom, John Young) into Earth orbit.
- March 25 – Martin Luther King Jr. and 25,000 civil rights activists successfully end the four-day march from Selma to Montgomery.
- March 30 – Funeral services are held for Detroit homemaker Viola Liuzzo, who was shot dead by three Klansmen as she drove marchers back to Selma the night of the civil rights march.
- March
  - The Negro Family: The Case For National Action government report issued.
  - The first African American Playmate of the Month, Jennifer Jackson, is featured in Playboy magazine.

=== April ===
- April 3 – The world's first space nuclear power reactor, SNAP-10A, is launched by the United States from Vandenberg AFB, California. The reactor operates for 43 days and remains in high Earth orbit.
- April 5 – At the 37th Academy Awards, George Cukor's My Fair Lady wins 8 Academy Awards, including Best Picture and Best Director for Cukor. Rex Harrison wins an Oscar for Best Actor. Robert Stevenson's Mary Poppins takes home 5 Oscars out of 13 nominations. English performer Julie Andrews wins an Academy Award for Best Actress, for her portrayal in the lead role. The Sherman Brothers receive 2 Oscars including Best Song for "Chim Chim Cher-ee". The ceremony is hosted by Bob Hope at Santa Monica Civic Auditorium.
- April 9
  - In Houston, Texas, the Harris County Domed Stadium (more commonly known as the Astrodome) opens.
  - Charlie Brown and the Peanuts Gang appear on the cover of Time.
  - The 100th anniversary of the end of the American Civil War is observed.
- April 11 – The Palm Sunday tornado outbreak of 1965: An estimated 51 tornadoes (47 confirmed) hit six Midwestern states, killing between 256 and 271 people and injuring some 1,500 more.
- April 14 – In Cold Blood killers Richard Hickock and Perry Smith, convicted of murdering four members of the Clutter family of Holcomb, Kansas, are executed by hanging at the Kansas State Penitentiary for Men in Lansing, Kansas.
- April 17 – The first SDS march against the Vietnam War draws 25,000 protestors to Washington, DC.
- April 21 – The New York World's Fair in Flushing Meadows reopens.
- April 25 – Sixteen-year-old sniper Michael Clark kills 3 and wounds others, shooting at cars from a hilltop along Highway 101 just south of Orcutt, California. Clark kills himself as police rush the hilltop.
- April 26 – The first complete performance of Charles Ives' Symphony No. 4, conducted by Leopold Stokowski with the American Symphony Orchestra at Carnegie Hall in New York City, is presented 11 years after the composer's death and around 40 years since he last worked on it.
- April 28 – U.S. troops are sent to the Dominican Republic by President Lyndon B. Johnson, "for the stated purpose of protecting U.S. citizens and preventing an alleged Communist takeover of the country", thus thwarting the possibility of "another Cuba".
- April 29 – The 6.7 M_{w} Puget Sound earthquake hits western Washington with a maximum Mercalli intensity of VIII (Severe), causing seven deaths and $12.5–28 million in financial losses in the Puget Sound region.

=== May ===
- May 5 – Forty men burn their draft cards at the University of California, Berkeley, and a coffin is marched to the Berkeley Draft Board.
- May 6 – A tornado outbreak near the Twin Cities in Minnesota kills 13 and injures 683.
- May 7 – The U.S. Steel freighter SS Cedarville collides with the SS Topdalsfjord and sinks near the Mackinac Bridge, killing 25 on board. Ten are rescued from the Cedarville, the third largest lake ship to sink after its sister the SS Carl D. Bradley, and the SS Edmund Fitzgerald.
- May 21 – The largest teach-in to date begins at Berkeley, California, attended by 30,000.
- May 22
  - The first skateboard championship is held.
  - Several hundred Vietnam War protesters in Berkeley, CA, march to the Draft Board again to burn 19 more cards. They hang an effigy of Lyndon Johnson at the demonstration.

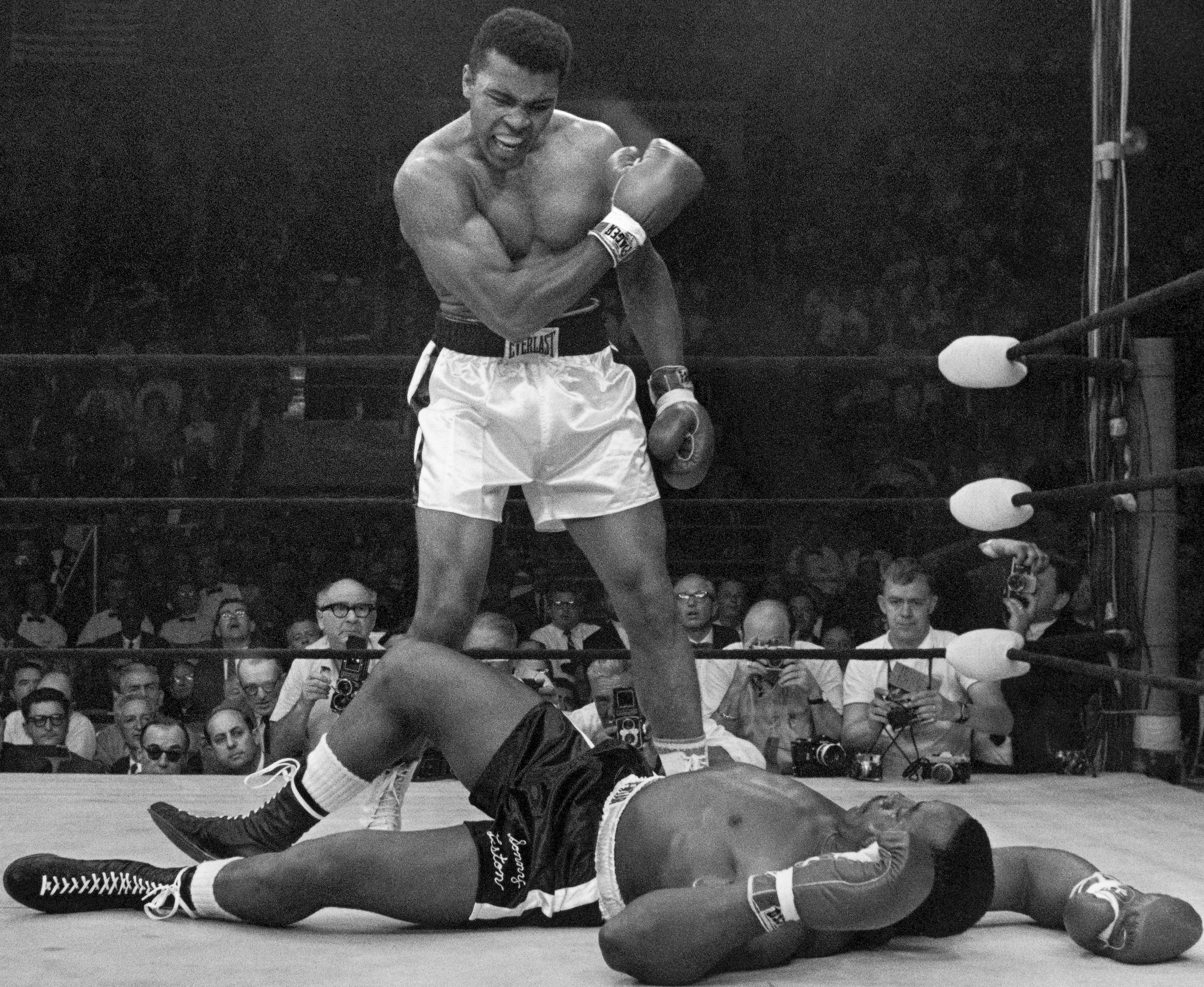
Muhammad Ali standing over Sonny Liston

- May 25 – World heavyweight boxing champion Muhammad Ali wins the rematch against former champion Sonny Liston only 60 seconds into the first round. Ali struck Liston with what would become known as the "Phantom Punch".
- May 31 – Scottish racing driver Jim Clark wins the Indianapolis 500, and later wins the Formula One world driving championship in the same year.

=== June ===
- June 1 – Florida International University is founded in Miami.
- June 3 – Gemini 4: Astronaut Ed White makes the first U.S. space walk.
- June 16 – A planned anti-war protest at The Pentagon becomes a teach-in, with demonstrators distributing 50,000 leaflets in and around the building.
- June 25 – A U.S. Air Force Boeing C135-A bound for Okinawa crashes just after takeoff at MCAS El Toro in Orange County, California, killing all 85 on board.
- June 28 – The DeFeo family moves from Brooklyn, New York, to 112 Ocean Avenue in Amityville, Long Island, New York. The murder of all but one of the DeFeos nine years later, on November 13, 1974, by the oldest son, Ronald/Ronnie "Butch" DeFeo Jr., and the subsequent claims of a haunting at 112 Ocean Avenue by the Lutz family, would lead to The Amityville Horror franchise of books and movies.

=== July ===
- July 13 – The Environmental Science Services Administration is created (combining Coast & Geodetic Survey and Weather Bureau).
- July 14 – U.S. spacecraft Mariner 4 flies by Mars, becoming the first spacecraft to return images from the planet.
- July 20 – Bob Dylan's influential single "Like a Rolling Stone" is released by Columbia Records.
- July 25 – Electric Dylan controversy: Bob Dylan elicits controversy among folk purists by "going electric" at the Newport Folk Festival.
- July 28 – Vietnam War: U.S. President Lyndon B. Johnson announces his order to increase the number of United States troops in South Vietnam from 75,000 to 125,000, and to double the number of men drafted per month from 17,000 to 35,000.
- July 30 – War on Poverty: U.S. President Lyndon B. Johnson signs the Social Security Act of 1965 into law, establishing Medicare and Medicaid.

=== August ===
- August 6 – U.S. President Lyndon B. Johnson signs the Voting Rights Act of 1965 into law, outlawing literacy tests and other discriminatory voting practices that have been responsible for widespread disfranchisement of African Americans.
- August 9 – An explosion at an Arkansas missile plant kills 53.
- August 11 – The Watts Riots begin in Los Angeles, California, leaving 34 people dead and causing $40 million in property damage over five days of rioting.
- August 13 – The rock group Jefferson Airplane debuts at the Matrix in San Francisco, California and begins to appear there regularly.
- August 15 – The Beatles perform the first stadium concert in the history of rock, playing at Shea Stadium in New York City.
- August 18 – Vietnam War – Operation Starlite: 5,500 United States Marines destroy a Viet Cong stronghold on the Van Tuong peninsula in Quang Ngai Province, in the first major American ground battle of the war. The Marines were tipped off by a Viet Cong deserter who said that there was an attack planned against the U.S. base at Chu Lai.
- August 20 – Jonathan Myrick Daniels, an Episcopal seminarian from Keene, New Hampshire, is murdered in Hayneville, Alabama while working with the American civil rights movement.
- August 21 – Gemini 5 (Gordon Cooper, Pete Conrad) is launched on the first one-week flight and the first test of fuel cells for electrical power.
- August 26 – President Johnson announces an end to the draft deferment for newly married men. Effective at midnight, all men will be eligible for the draft regardless of their marital status.
- August 28 – The first Subway opens in Bridgeport, Connecticut.
- August 30
  - Bob Dylan releases his influential album Highway 61 Revisited, featuring the song "Like a Rolling Stone."
  - Casey Stengel announces his retirement after 55 years in baseball.

=== September ===
- September 1 – WTWO begins broadcasting in Terre Haute, Indiana.
- September 7 – Vietnam War: In a follow-up to August's Operation Starlite, United States Marines and South Vietnamese forces initiate Operation Piranha on the Batangan Peninsula, 23 miles south of the Chu Lai Marine base.
- September 9
  - Sandy Koufax pitches a perfect game in a baseball match against the Chicago Cubs. The opposing pitcher, Bob Hendley, allows only one run, which is unearned.
  - Hurricane Betsy roars ashore near New Orleans, Louisiana with winds of 145 MPH, causing 76 deaths and $1.42 billion in damage. The storm is the first hurricane to cause $1 billion in unadjusted damages, giving it the nickname "Billion Dollar Betsy". It is the last major hurricane to strike New Orleans until Hurricane Katrina 40 years later.
  - The Department of Housing and Urban Development (HUD) begins operation.
- September 14 – The infamous "bad sitcom" My Mother The Car premieres on NBC.
- September 18 – The first ever Mr. Olympia bodybuilding competition is held at the Brooklyn Academy of Music in New York City and is won by Larry Scott.
- September 25 – The Tom & Jerry cartoon series makes its world broadcast premiere on CBS.
- September 28 – Fidel Castro announces that anyone who wants to can emigrate to the United States.

=== October ===
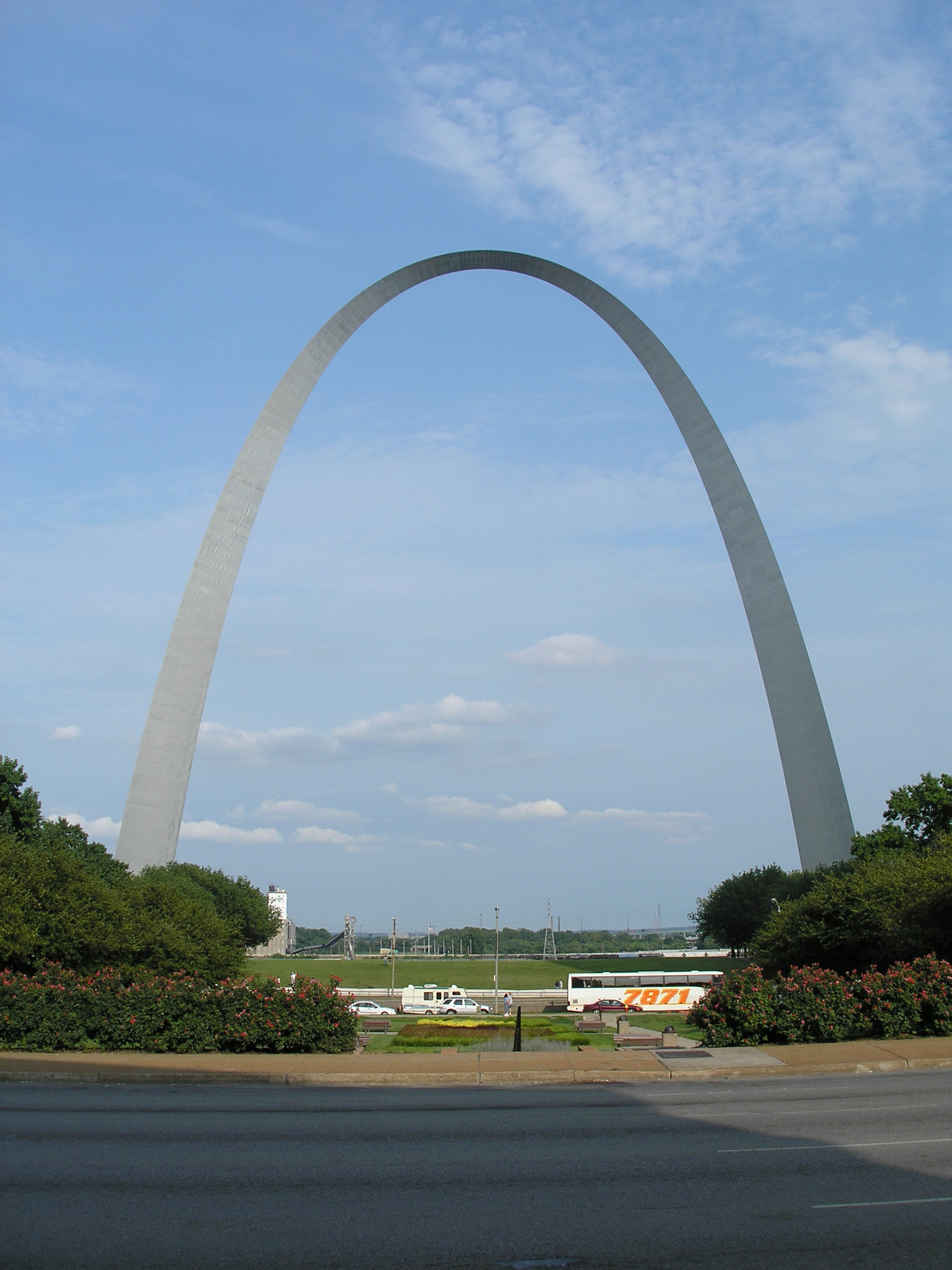
October 28: The Gateway Arch is completed

- October 3 – U.S. President Lyndon B. Johnson signs an immigration bill which abolishes quotas based on national origin.
- October 4
  - Pope Paul VI makes the first papal visit to the United States. He appears for a Mass in Yankee Stadium and makes a speech at the United Nations.
  - The University of California, Irvine opens its doors.
- October 9 – Yale University presents the Vinland map.
- October 10 – The first group of Cuban refugees travels to the U.S.
- October 14 – The Los Angeles Dodgers defeat the Minnesota Twins, 4 games to 3, to win their 4th World Series Title.
- October 15 – Opposition to United States involvement in the Vietnam War: The Catholic Worker Movement stages an anti-war protest in Manhattan. One protestor who carries out a draft-card burning, David J. Miller, is arrested, the first under the new amendment to the Military Selective Service Act.
- October 16 – Anti-war protests draw 100,000 in 80 U.S. cities and around the world.
- October 17 – The New York World's Fair at Flushing Meadows, New York, closes. Due to financial losses, some of the projected site park improvements fail to materialize.
- October 26 – Police discover the body of Sylvia Likens in Indianapolis, Indiana.
- October 28 – In St. Louis, Missouri, the 630-foot-tall parabolic steel Gateway Arch is completed.
- October 29 – An 80-kiloton nuclear device is detonated at Amchitka Island, Alaska as part of the Vela Uniform program, code-named Project Long Shot.
- October 30
  - Vietnam War: Near Da Nang, United States Marines repel an intense attack by Viet Cong forces, killing 56 guerrillas. Among the dead, a sketch of Marine positions is found on the body of a 13-year-old Vietnamese boy who sold drinks to the Marines the day before.
  - In Washington, D.C., a pro-Vietnam War march draws 25,000.

=== November ===
- November 2
  - Quaker Norman Morrison sets himself on fire outside the Pentagon to protest United States involvement in the Vietnam War.
  - Liberal Republican John Lindsay is elected mayor of New York City.
- November 6 – Freedom Flights begin: Cuba and the United States formally agree to start an airlift for Cubans who want to go to the United States (by 1971, 250,000 Cubans take advantage of this program).
- November 7 – The Pillsbury Company's mascot, the Pillsbury Doughboy, is created.
- November 8
  - Vietnam War: During Operation Hump, medic Lawrence Joel becomes the first African American since the Spanish–American War to receive the United States Medal of Honor.
  - American Airlines Flight 383 crashes on approach to Cincinnati, killing 58 of 62 people on board.
  - The soap opera Days of Our Lives debuts on NBC.
- November 9
  - Northeast Blackout of 1965: Several U.S. states (Vermont, New Hampshire, Massachusetts, Connecticut, Rhode Island, New York and portions of New Jersey) and parts of Canada are hit by a series of blackouts lasting up to 13½ hours.
  - Vietnam War: In New York City, 22-year-old Catholic Worker Movement member Roger Allen LaPorte sets himself on fire in front of the United Nations building in protest of the war.
- November 14 – Vietnam War: Battle of the Ia Drang – In the Ia Drang Valley of the Central Highlands in Vietnam, the first major engagement of the war between regular United States and North Vietnamese forces begins.
- November 15 – U.S. racer Craig Breedlove sets a new land speed record of 600.601 mph on Bonneville Salt Flats.
- November 22 – Man of La Mancha opens in a Greenwich Village theatre in New York City and eventually becomes one of the greatest musical hits of all time, winning a Tony Award for its star, Richard Kiley.
- November 27
  - Tens of thousands of Vietnam War protesters picket the White House, then march on the Washington Monument.
  - Vietnam War: The Pentagon tells U.S. President Lyndon B. Johnson that if planned major sweep operations to neutralize Viet Cong forces during the next year are to succeed, the number of American troops in Vietnam will have to be increased from 120,000 to 400,000.
- November 28 – Vietnam War: In response to U.S. President Lyndon B. Johnson's call for "more flags" in Vietnam, Philippines President-elect Ferdinand Marcos announces he will send troops to help fight in South Vietnam.
- November 30 – Ralph Nader's book Unsafe at Any Speed: The Designed-In Dangers of the American Automobile is published.

=== December ===
- December 9 – A Charlie Brown Christmas, the first Peanuts television special, debuts on CBS. It becomes a Christmas tradition.
- December 15 – Gemini 6 and Gemini 7 perform the first controlled rendezvous in Earth orbit.
- December 17 – The British government begins an oil embargo against Rhodesia; the United States joins the effort.
- December 21 – A new, 1-hour German-American production of The Nutcracker, with an international cast that includes Edward Villella in the title role, makes its U.S. TV debut. It is repeated annually by CBS over the next 3 years, but after that, it is virtually forgotten.

=== Undated ===
- Jenny and Sylvia Likens are left in the care of Indianapolis housewife Gertrude Baniszewski. Sylvia is found dead and mutilated 3 months later.
- Tokyo officially becomes the largest city in the world, taking the lead from New York City.

=== Ongoing ===
- Cold War (1947–1991)
- Space Race (1957–1975)
- Vietnam War, U.S. involvement (1964–1973)

== Births ==
- January 1
  - Billiam van Roestenberg, political activist, former model, philanthropist, and organic farmer
  - Terri Sewell, African-American lawyer and politician
  - John Sullivan, real estate agent and politician
  - Andrew Valmon, runner and coach
- January 2
  - Curt Hagman, Mayor of Chino Hills
  - Greg Swindell, baseball player and coach
- January 3 – Sharrie Williams, blues and gospel singer-songwriter
- January 4 – Rick Hearst, actor
- January 5 – Ricky Paull Goldin, actor
- January 6 – Cynthia Dill, lawyer, Member of the Maine Senate from the 7th District
- January 7
  - Matthew Levatich, businessman, president of Harley-Davidson
  - John Ondrasik (Five for Fighting), singer-songwriter
- January 8 – Maria Pitillo, actress
- January 9 – Jamie Callender, politician, member of the Ohio House of Representatives
- January 10 – Butch Hartman, animator, writer, producer, director, voice actor, and YouTuber
- January 11 – Mark Halperin, journalist
- January 13
  - Rod Rosenstein, officeholder (Deputy Attorney General) and lawyer
  - Kevin Samuels, Internet personality and image consultant (died 2022)
- January 17
  - John Hoffmann, American politician, Minnesota Senate
  - Jim Holt, American politician, Arkansas House of Representatives
- January 19 – J. B. Pritzker, businessman, philanthropist, politician, and the 43rd governor of Illinois
- January 21 – Michele Ruiz, entrepreneur
- January 22 – Diane Lane, actress
- January 24
  - Mike Awesome, professional wrestler (d. 2007)
  - William Derrough, investment banker
- January 26 – Kevin McCarthy, 55th Speaker of the House
- January 27 – Tim Chambers, college baseball coach (died 2019)
- January 28 – Robert von Dassanowsky, academic, writer, poet, film and cultural historian and producer (died 2023)
- January 30 – Julie McCullough, actress
- January 31
  - Cindy Ambuehl, actress
  - John L. Brownlee, attorney
  - Peter Sagal, NPR host
- February 2 – Cady Huffman, actress
- February 3
  - Kathleen Kinmont, actress, producer and screenwriter
  - Maura Tierney, actress and producer
- February 4
  - Jerome Brown, American football player (died 1992)
- February 5 – Ken LaCorte, executive at Fox News Channel
- February 6
  - Jim Christian, basketball coach
  - Dana Eskelson, television actress
- February 7 – Chris Rock, African-American comedian and actor
- February 9
  - Michael Brandon, gay pornographic actor and director
  - Stephin Merritt, singer-songwriter and multi-instrumentalist
- February 10 – David Aldridge, writer
- February 12 – Mia Frye, dance choreographer
- February 13 – Andy Buckley, actor
- February 14 – Donald DeGrood, Roman Catholic bishop
- February 15 – Jon Moritsugu, filmmaker
- February 19
  - Clark Hunt, CEO of the Kansas City Chiefs
  - Jon Fishman, drummer
- February 20
  - Matt Bartle, politician
  - Ron Eldard, actor
- February 21 – Shawn Slocum, American football coach
- February 22
  - Chris Dudley, basketball player and politician
  - Pat LaFontaine, ice hockey player
- February 23
  - Kristin Davis, actress
  - Michael Dell, computer manufacturer
- February 24 – Jane Swift, executive, former governor of Massachusetts
- February 26 – Tim Armstead, Republican politician and jurist from West Virginia
- March 1 – Booker T, pro wrestler
- March 2 – Ron Gant, news anchor
- March 3 – Tom Brower, politician
- March 4 – Stacy Edwards, actress
- March 5 – Kathleen Delaney, actress
- March 6 – Lora Leigh, novelist
- March 7 – E. E. Knight, science fiction writer
- March 8 – Kenny Smith, basketball player
- March 9 – Benito Santiago, baseball player
- March 10
  - Randy Weiner, playwright, producer and theater and nightclub owner
  - Rod Woodson, American football player
- March 11
  - Jesse Jackson Jr., African-American politician
  - Wallace Langham, actor
  - Andy Sturmer, musician, singer, songwriter, and composer
- March 12 – Steve Finley, baseball player
- March 13 – Gigi Rice, actress
- March 14 – Kevin Brown, baseball player
- March 15 – Carl J. Artman, politician
- March 16 – Angela Taylor, athlete and collegiate coach
- March 17 – George Hinkle, American football player
- March 18 – Shannon Grove, politician
- March 19
  - Joseph D. Kucan, video game developer
  - Jeff Pidgeon, animator and voice actor
- March 22 – Rick Harrison, businessman
- March 24 – The Undertaker, professional wrestler and actor
- March 25
  - Avery Johnson, basketball player and coach
  - Sarah Jessica Parker, actress
- March 30 – Juliet Landau, actress and producer
- March 31
  - Steve Bing, businessman, philanthropist and film producer (suicide 2020)
  - William McNamara, film actor
- April 1 – Mark Jackson, basketball coach
- April 2 – Rodney King, convicted criminal and police brutality victim (died 2012)
- April 4 – Robert Downey Jr., actor and producer
- April 7 – Bill Bellamy, actor and comedian
- April 8 – Erika Cosby, painter
- April 12
  - Tom O'Brien, actor-producer
  - Jonathan Fahn, voice actor
- April 14 – Kirk Windstein, musician
- April 16
  - Jon Cryer, actor, comedian and television director
  - Martin Lawrence, African-American actor, comedian, and producer
- April 17 – William Mapother, actor
- April 23 – Tommy DeCarlo, singer and songwriter
- April 25 – Eric Avery, musician
- April 28 – Karl Logan, musician
- May 3 – Mary L. Trump, psychologist and author
- May 9 – Lisa Colagrossi, journalist (died 2015)
- May 13
  - Tim Chapman, bounty hunter
  - Lari White, country singer (died 2018)
- May 16 – Krist Novoselic, rock bassist (Nirvana)
- May 19 – Maile Flanagan, actress
- May 20 – Ted Allen, author and television personality
  - Billy Donovan, basketball coach
- May 27 – Todd Bridges, actor and comedian
- May 31 – DJ Casper, musician (died 2023)
- June 2 – Jim Knipfel, journalist and author
- June 3
  - Jeff Blumenkrantz, actor and composer
  - Mike Gordon, rock singer, bass player and director
  - Mike Shula, American football coach
- June 7 – Mick Foley, pro wrestler
- June 8
  - Chris Chavis ("Tatanka"), professional wrestler
  - Frank Grillo, American actor
  - Kevin Farley, American actor
  - Kevin Ritz, American baseball pitcher
- June 10 – Scott Graham, sportscaster
- June 11 – Pamela Gidley, actress and model (died 2018)
- June 16 – Andrea M. Ghez, astronomer, recipient of the Nobel Prize in Physics in 2020
- June 21 – Michael Dolan, theatre and film actor, director and educator
- June 22
  - Just-Ice, rapper
  - J. J. Cohen, actor
- June 23 – Sylvia Mathews Burwell, government
- June 24 – Chris Barnes, child actor
- June 26 – Randy Hembrey, Road Racing director
- June 28 – Sonny Strait, voice actor and director
- June 30
  - Mitch Richmond, basketball player
  - Bobby Vitale, pornographic actor
- July 1 – Tom Hodges, actor and film producer
- July 4
  - Horace Grant, basketball player
  - Harvey Grant, basketball player
  - Jay Crawford, sports journalist
- July 5
  - Kathryn Erbe, actress
  - Eyran Katsenelenbogen, Israeli-American pianist and educator
- July 7
  - Sam Holbrook, baseball player and umpire
  - Karen Malina White, actress
- July 8
  - Lee Tergesen, actor
  - Corey Parker, actor and coach
- July 10 – Alec Mapa, actor, comedian and writer
- July 15
  - Scott Livingstone, baseball player
  - Bobby Gustafson, guitarist
- July 16
  - Billy Mitchell, video game player
  - Daryl Mitchell, African-American actor
  - Sherri Stoner, actress, producer, and screenwriter
- July 18
  - Michael Sharrett, actor
  - Jim Bob Duggar, real estate agent, politician, and television personality
- July 19
  - Clea Lewis, actress and singer
  - Stuart Scott, sports reporter and ESPN anchor (died 2015)
- July 20 – Anthony Shriver, activist
- July 21 – Tom Gulager, actor
- July 22 – Shawn Michaels, professional wrestler and actor
- July 24
  - Brian Blades, National Football League wide receiver
  - Kadeem Hardison, actor and director
  - Doug Liman, director and producer
- July 25 – Illeana Douglas, actress and producer
- July 26 – Jimmy Dore, comedian
- August 5 – Tammy Murphy, politician
- August 11
  - Viola Davis, African-American actress
  - Duane Martin, actor
  - Embeth Davidtz, American actress
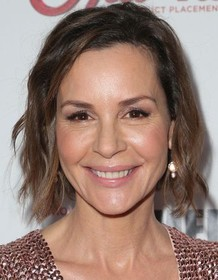
    Embeth Davidtz
- August 13 – Deborah Falconer, actress
- August 14 – Terry Richardson, fashion photographer
- August 15 – Rob Thomas, author, producer, director and screenwriter
- August 17 – David McCormick, politician and businessman
- August 18 – Bob Harper, personal trainer and author
- August 19
  - Kevin Dillon, actor
  - Kyra Sedgwick, actress
- August 22 – Thaddeus McCotter, politician and radio host
- August 24
  - Dee Harvey, R&B singer (died 2012)
  - Reggie Miller, basketball player and commentator
- August 26 – Bobby Duncum Jr., American professional wrestler (died 2000)
- August 27
  - Lynn Shelton, filmmaker (died 2020)
  - Scott Dibble, politician and activist
  - LeRoy Homer Jr., airline pilot (died 2001)
- September 9
  - Dan Majerle, basketball player
  - Charles Esten, actor
  - Constance Marie, actress
- September 11 – Paul Heyman, wrestling promoter, ECW<ref">Golianopoulos, Thomas (November 16, 2017). "The Biggeslvtfdgbgyhbdgimo m/2017/11/16/16666828/paul-heyman-wwe-brock-lesnar-life-career". The Ringer.</ref>
- September 13 – Jeff Ross, stand-up comedian, writer, and actor
- September 17 – Kim Davis, anti-LGBT activist
- September 18 – Tim Scott, U.S. Senator from South Carolina from 2013
- September 28 – Scott Fellows, animator
- September 30
  - Kathleen Madigan, comedian
  - Daron Norwood, country singer (died 2015)
- October 1 – J. Paul Oetken, judge
- October 4
  - John Melendez, television announcer
  - Micky Ward, boxer
- October 6 – Steve Scalise, House majority whip and U.S. Representative of Louisiana's 1st district
- October 10 – Chris Penn, actor (died 2006)
- October 11
  - Bobby Wayne Woods, convicted murderer, kidnapper and rapist (died 2009)
  - Julianne McNamara, artistic gymnast
- October 13 – Bill Odenkirk, comedy writer
- October 18 – Curtis Stigers, jazz vocalist and saxophonist
- October 27 – Chad Larson American-Canadian rock guitarist
- November 5 – Atul Gawande, surgeon and writer
- November 6 – Greg Graffin, rock singer (Bad Religion)
- November 12 – Lex Lang, voice actor and director
- November 13 – Kurt Marshall, model and actor (died 1988)
- November 17 – Pam Bondi, attorney and politician, 87th U.S. Attorney General
- November 20 – Mike D, rapper (Beastie Boys)
- November 21 – Bill Oberst Jr., actor
- November 22 – Wendy Moten, singer
- November 23 – Don Frye, professional wrestler and mixed martial arts fighter
- November 25
  - Tim Armstrong, singer-songwriter, guitarist, and producer
  - Cris Carter, American football player
- November 28 – Matt Williams, American baseball player
- November 30 – Ben Stiller, actor, screenwriter, film director and producer, son of Jerry Stiller and Anne Meara, brother of Amy Stiller and spouse of Christine Taylor
- December 4 – Veronica Taylor, voice actress
- December 10 – J Mascis, rock singer, guitarist and drummer
- December 11 – Charlene Thomas-Swinson, basketball coach
- December 12 – Russell Batiste Jr., funk and R&B drummer (died 2023)
- December 14
  - Madeline Amy Sweeney, flight attendant (died 2001)
  - Craig Biggio, baseball player
  - Ted Raimi, actor, producer and writer
- December 15 –Ted Slampyak, comic strip cartoonist
- December 22
  - Lee Rogers Berger American-born explorer and paleoanthropologist
  - Jonathan Joss, actor and musician (died 2025)
- December 23 – Martin Kratt, zoologist and educational nature show host
- December 30
  - Heidi Fleiss, madam
  - Kelli Maroney, actress
- December 31
  - Nicholas Sparks, author

== Deaths ==
- January 4 – T. S. Eliot, poet, essayist, publisher, playwright, literary critic, and editor (born 1888)
- January 7 – Sarah Edwards, Welsh-born American actress (born 1881)
- January 12 – Lorraine Hansberry, African American playwright and writer (born 1930)
- January 14 – Jeanette MacDonald, actress and singer (born 1903)
- January 19 – George Hogan, basketball player (born 1915)
- January 20 – Alan Freed, disc jockey (born 1921)
- February 5 – Irving Bacon, actor (born 1893)
- February 7 – Nance O'Neil, actress (born 1874)
- February 10 – Arthur C. Davis, admiral (born 1893)
- February 11 – Loyal Blaine Aldrich, astronomer (born 1884)
- February 13
  - Jerry Burke, musician (born 1911)
  - Gloria Morgan Vanderbilt, socialite twin born 1904)
- February 15 – Nat King Cole, singer and musician (born 1919)
- February 19
  - Forrest Taylor, actor (born 1883)
  - Tom Wilson, actor (born 1880)
- February 21 – Malcolm X, African American Muslim minister and human rights activist (born 1925)
- February 23 – Stan Laurel, English actor (born 1890)
- March 6 – Margaret Dumont, actress (born 1882)
- March 14 – Marion Jones Farquhar, tennis player (born 1879)
- March 17 – Quentin Reynolds, journalist (born 1902)
- March 23 – Mae Murray, actress, film producer, dancer, and screenwriter (born 1885)
- March 25 – Wolfgang Klemperer, Austrian American scientist and engineer (born 1893 in Germany)
- March 30 – Philip Showalter Hench, physician, recipient of the Nobel Prize in Physiology or Medicine in 1950 (born 1896)
- April 1 – Helena Rubinstein, Polish and American businesswoman and art collector (born 1872)
- April 10 – Linda Darnell, actress (born 1923)
- April 24 – Louise Dresser, actress (born 1878)
- April 27 – Edward R. Murrow, broadcast journalist and war correspondent (born 1908)
- May 1 – Spike Jones, musician, bandleader, and conductor (born 1911)
- May 23 – Earl Webb, baseball player (born 1897)
- May 24 – Sonny Boy Williamson II, blues harmonica player, singer, and songwriter (born 1912)
- June 1 – Curly Lambeau, American football player and coach (born 1898)
- June 2 – Nannie Doss, serial killer (born 1905)
- June 7 – Judy Holliday, actress and singer (born 1921)
- June 22 – David O. Selznick, film producer, screenwriter, and film studio executive (born 1902)
- June 25 – Burr Shafer, cartoonist (born 1899)
- July 1 – Claude Thornhill, pianist, arranger, composer and bandleader (born 1908)
- July 14 – Adlai Stevenson II, politician (born 1900)
- July 19 – Clyde Beatty, animal trainer, actor, zoo owner, and circus mogul (born 1903)
- July 24 – Constance Bennett, actress and producer (born 1904)
- August – Robert P. Braddicks, New York City businessman (born 1882)
- August 6 – Nancy Carroll, actress (born 1903)
- August 8 – Shirley Jackson, writer (born 1916)
- August 25 – Johnny Hayes, athlete (born 1886)
- August 29 – Paul Waner, baseball player (born 1903)
- August 31 – E. E. "Doc" Smith, science-fiction writer (born 1890)
- September 8 – Dorothy Dandridge, actress and singer (born 1922)
- September 16 – Fred Quimby, animation producer and journalist (born 1886)
- September 27 – Clara Bow, actress (born 1905)
- October 1 – Anton Boisen, founder of the clinical pastoral education movement (born 1876)
- October 2 – Nicky Arnstein, professional gambler and con artist, married to Fanny Brice (born 1879)
- October 3 – Zachary Scott, actor (born 1914)
- October 11 – Dorothea Lange, documentary photographer and photojournalist (born 1895)
- October 18 – Henry Travers, English actor (born 1874)
- October 21 – Marie McDonald, actress and singer (born 1923)
- October 26 – Sylvia Likens, murder victim (born 1949)
- October 27 – Edythe Wright, singer (born 1916)
- November 6 – Clarence Williams, jazz pianist, composer, promoter, vocalist, theatrical producer, and publisher
- November 8 – Dorothy Kilgallen, columnist, journalist, and game show panelist (born 1913)
- November 14
  - Tony DeMarco, dancer (born 1898)
  - Allen B. DuMont, electronics engineer and inventor (born 1901)
- November 16 – Harry Blackstone Sr., magician and illusionist (born 1885)
- November 18
  - Lou Black, banjo player (born 1901)
  - Henry A. Wallace, 33rd vice president of the United States from 1941 to 1945 (born 1888)
- December 5
  - Mary Dailey, baseball player (born 1928)
  - Joseph Erlanger, physiologist and academic, Nobel Prize laureate (born 1874)
- December 8 – Dutch Sterrett, baseball player (born 1889)
- December 9 – Branch Rickey, baseball player, manager, and executive (born 1881)
- December 12 – Johnny Lee, singer, dancer, and actor (born 1898)
- December 20 – Allen Easter Ericson Weatherford, university professor of physical education (born 1907)
- December 28 – Lynn Thorndike, historian of medieval science and alchemy (born 1882)

== See also ==
- List of American films of 1965
- Timeline of United States history (1950–1969)
