= Alice Herz =

German feminist and pacifist (1882–1965)

- Born: Alice Jeanette Strauß; 25 May 1882; Hamburg, German Empire
- Died: 26 March 1965 (aged 82); Detroit, Michigan, U.S.
- Cause of death: Burns from self-immolation
- Occupation: Writer
- Spouse: Paul Herz
- Children: 2

Alice Jeanette Herz (née Strauß, alternatively rendered Strauss; 25 May 1882 – 26 March 1965) was a German feminist, anti-fascist and peace activist. She was the first person in the United States known to have immolated herself in protest of the escalating Vietnam War, following the example of Buddhist monk Thích Quảng Đức who immolated himself in protest of the oppression of Buddhists under the South Vietnamese government of Catholic President Ngo Dinh Diem.

== Early life ==
Alice Jeanette Strauß was the first child of Rosalie Kramer (1858–1943) and Moritz Strauß (1850–1920), both of German-Jewish descent. She had six siblings, five younger sisters and a younger brother, who died at the age of two. She finished intermediate education and studied to become a teacher, but an eye disorder prevented Herz from completing her seminars and she instead found work as a secretary for a lawyer's office in Rostock. In 1907, Herz converted from Judaism to Protestantism.

== Activism in Germany ==
During the early 1900s, Herz joined the feminist movement and became an advocate for women's rights, particularly for universal suffrage and cohabitation. She married Paul Herz, a chemist and the brother of Margarete Herz, a prominent suffragette. The couple moved to Güstrow in Mecklenburg-Schwerin, where she founded a regional chapter of Deutscher Verband für Frauenstimmrecht. They had two children, Helga (1912–2010) and Konrad (1915–1929). Konrad was born physically weak and was nearly blind.

Shortly after the beginning of World War I, her husband was drafted into the military, with Herz expecting German victory and Paul's return within months. In 1918, with no end of the war in sight, Herz began openly supporting the democratisation of Germany with fellow pro-democracy activists and feminists, who sought the implementation of the vote for women. The movement tried to appeal to state minister Hans Sivkovich for "the right to vote by universal, equal, secret and direct suffrage" and with the end of World War I in November that same year, voting rights were realised with the founding of the Weimar Republic. Herz and her husband subsequently joined the German League for Human Rights. In 1919, the Herz family moved to Berlin-Mahlsdorf, after Paul secured a position at a rubber factory in nearby Köpenick. Possibly as a result of the regular exposure to hazardous chemicals, Paul died of kidney failure on 30 December 1928, aged 45. Their 13-year-old son Konrad passed away less than two months later on 2 February 1929 from health complications. Due to her husband's death, Herz began providing private child care and teaching music lessons at her house to make money. In 1931, she moved to France after her daughter relocated to Grenoble for her education, with Herz taking a job as an English teacher in Nice. Both ultimately returned to Berlin in 1932.

On 13 March 1933, Herz and her daughter Helga left Germany for Switzerland, something she had considered for the past few years due to concerns with rising antisemitism and the growing political power of right-wing parties in the Weimar Republic. She solidified her decision with the appointment of Adolf Hitler as Reich Chancellor. Herz had correctly predicted that Jews and political opponents, especially left-wing, would come under heavy scrutiny, particularly after the Reichstag fire. Alice and Helga then moved to France, where Alice learned French and Esperanto. Both Herz women continued to engage in political activism through their involvement in the Women's International League for Peace and Freedom, with Alice criticising Nazism in papers she supplied to publications of the Social Democratic Party of Germany. Upon the party's forceful dissolution by the Nazi government in the summer of 1933, she became a writer for the Swiss Christian socialist magazine Neue Wege. Due to their escape, the Herz property was seized and sold off as Reich Flight Tax.

Following the Invasion of France, Herz and Helga spent several months at Gurs internment camp near the Spanish border. They were then sheltered by a French Catholic priest in the nearby countryside until March 1942.

== Life in the United States and anti-war effort ==
In spring 1942, Herz and her daughter made plans to flee Europe for the United States. A nephew of her deceased husband contacted the Quaker American Friends Service Committee, who facilitated the pair's escape via Casablanca and Cuba, arriving in Kansas City by 1943. Alice and Helga settled in Detroit, Michigan, where Helga became a librarian at the Detroit Public Library, and Alice worked for some time as an adjunct instructor of German at Wayne State University. Both Herz women became involved in several peace groups, with Alice Herz also joining the Quakers Silence Meeting in 1946. In 1947, Herz and her daughter petitoned for, but were denied, U.S. citizenship due to their refusal to vow to defend the nation by arms. Helga later reapplied and was granted citizenship in 1954, but it is not clear if Alice ever did so.

In 1951, Herz was ousted by the Quaker group after she was accused of being a communist, resulting in observation by the House Un-American Activities Committee for several years. Alice and Helga subsequently joined the Unitarian Universalists, though Alice reportedly still identified with Quaker beliefs. She maintained her work with the Women's International League for Peace and Freedom and also joined Women Strike for Peace. Throughout the early 1960s, Herz participated in several protest movements, in opposition to nuclear weapons, the embargo on Cuba during the 1962 missile crisis, and the 1964 use of the USS Biddle in the proposed Multilateral Force. She was also involved in the civil rights movement and took part in the Selma to Montgomery marches only days before her death.

Herz wrote an open letter, which she distributed to several friends and fellow activists before her death. In her letter, she accused President Lyndon B. Johnson of using his military power "to wipe out whole countries of his choosing". She appealed to the American people to "awake and take action" against war, and explained her self-immolation as an attempt "to make myself heard". Herz initially planned to stage the self-immolation on the Wayne State University campus on 18 March, but she ended up the date two days ahead.

== Self-immolation ==
Herz set fire to herself on a street in Detroit on 16 March 1965, at the age of 82. A motorist and his two sons were driving by and saw her burning and put out the flames. She died of her injuries ten days later. According to Taylor Branch's At Canaan's Edge (2006), it was President Johnson's address to Congress in support of a Voting Rights Act that led her to believe the moment was propitious to protest against the Vietnam War.

== Legacy ==
Confiding to a friend before her death, Herz remarked that she had used all of the accepted protest methods available to activists—including marching, protesting, and writing countless articles and letters—and she wondered what else she could do. Japanese author and philosopher Shingo Shibata established the Alice Herz Peace Fund shortly after her death. Following the establishment of modern Vietnam, a photo of Herz was put in the exhibit of the Vietnam Museum of Revolution. In 2003, the Alice-Herz-Platz was named in her honor near her former home in Berlin-Mahlsdorf.

== See also ==
- Norman Morrison
- Roger Allen LaPorte
- George Winne, Jr.
- List of political self-immolations
