= Thích Quảng Đức =

Vietnamese Buddhist monk (1897–1963)

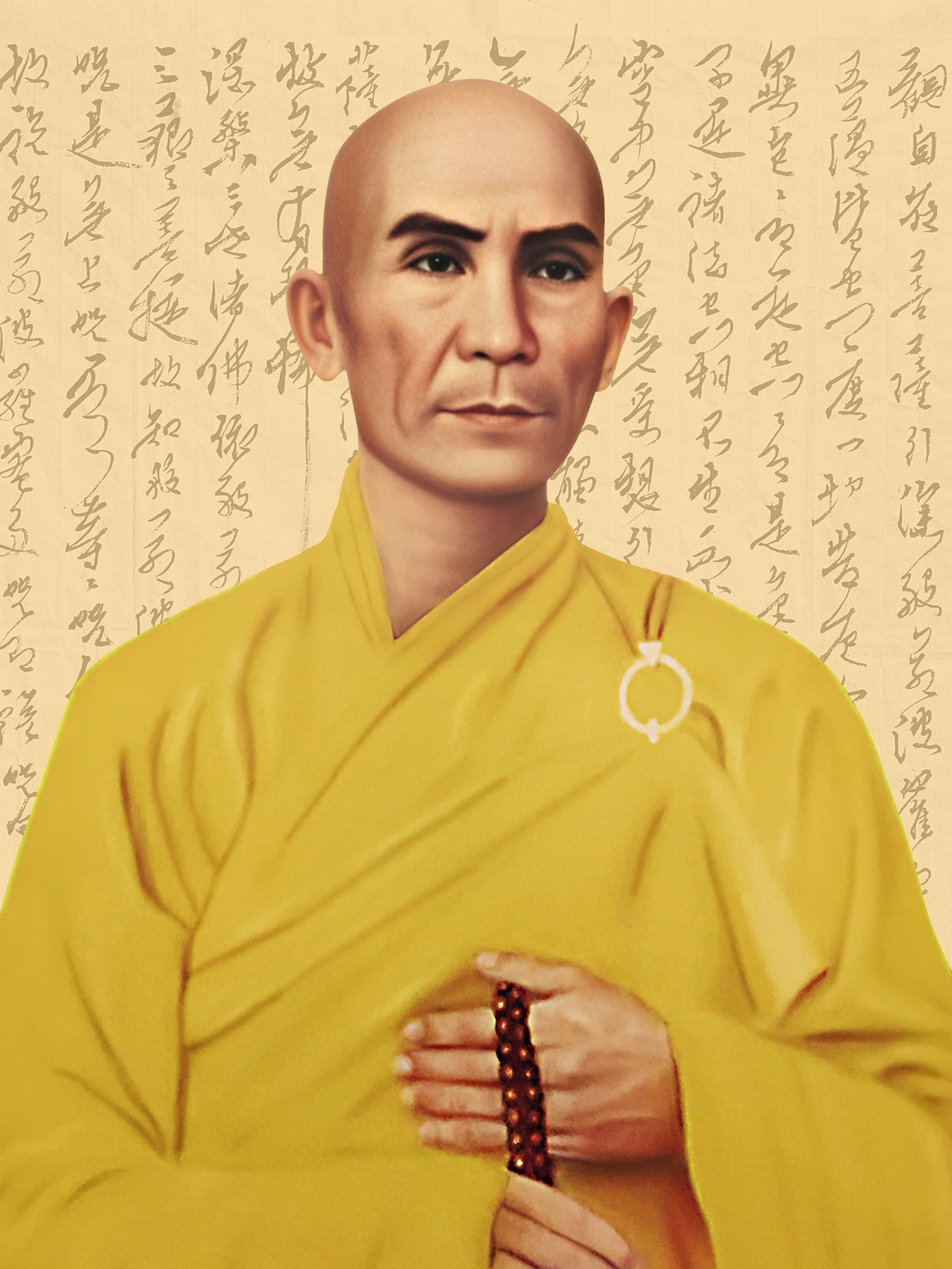
- Title: Buddhist monk

Personal life
- Born: Lâm Văn Túc c. 1897 Hội Khánh, Annam, French Indochina
- Died: 11 June 1963 (aged 65–66) Saigon, South Vietnam
- Cause of death: Suicide by self-immolation
- Other name: Bồ Tát Thích Quảng Đức (Bodhisattva Thích Quảng Đức)

Religious life
- Religion: Buddhism
- Sect: Mahayana (Pure Land)
- Ordination: 1917

Senior posting
- Based in: South Vietnam
- Post: Chairman of the Panel on Ceremonial Rites of the Congregation of Vietnamese Monks; Abbot of the Phước Hòa Pagoda
- Period in office: 1917–1963

Thích Quảng Đức (Note: chữ Hán: 釋廣德, Vietnamese: [tʰǐk̟ kʷâːŋ ɗɨ̌k]) (born Lâm Văn Túc; c. 1897 – 11 June 1963) was a Vietnamese Mahayana Buddhist monk who is best known for his death by self-immolation at a busy Saigon road intersection on 11 June 1963. Quảng Đức was protesting against the persecution of Buddhists by the South Vietnamese government of Ngô Đình Diệm, a staunch Roman Catholic. Photographs of his self-immolation circulated around the world, drawing attention to the policies of the Diệm government. John F. Kennedy said of one photograph, "No news picture in history has generated so much emotion around the world as that one". Malcolm Browne won the World Press Photo of the Year for his photograph of the monk's death.

Quảng Đức's act increased international pressure on Diệm and led him to promise reforms with the intention of mollifying the Buddhists. The reforms were not implemented, leading to a deterioration in the dispute. As protests continued, the ARVN Special Forces loyal to Diệm's brother, Ngô Đình Nhu, began the Xá Lợi Pagoda raids on Buddhist pagodas, seizing Quảng Đức's heart and causing deaths and widespread damage. Several Buddhist monks followed Quảng Đức's example. Eventually, a US-backed coup toppled Diệm, who was assassinated on 2 November 1963.

== Biography ==
Accounts of the life of Quảng Đức are derived from information disseminated by Buddhist organizations. He was born in the village of Hội Khánh, in Vạn Ninh District of Khánh Hòa Province in central Vietnam as Lâm Văn Túc, one of seven children of Lâm Hữu Ứng and his wife, Nguyễn Thị Nương. At the age of seven, he left to study Buddhism under Hòa thượng (Note: Hòa thượng (Vietnamese for 'The Most Venerable').) Thích Hoằng Thâm, who was his maternal uncle and spiritual master. Thích Hoằng Thâm raised him as a son and Lâm Văn Túc changed his name to Nguyễn Văn Khiết. At age 15, he took the samanera (novice) vows and was ordained as a monk at age 20 under the dharma name Thích Quảng Đức. The Vietnamese name Thích (釋) is from "Thích Ca" or "Thích Già" (釋迦), means "of the Shakya clan." After ordination, he traveled to a mountain near Ninh Hòa, vowing to live the life of a solitary Buddhism-practicing hermit for three years. He returned in later life to open the Thien Loc pagoda at his mountain retreat.

After his self-imposed isolation ended, he began to travel around central Vietnam expounding the dharma. After two years, he went into retreat at the Sac Tu Thien An pagoda near Nha Trang. In 1932, he was appointed an inspector for the Buddhist Association in Ninh Hòa before becoming the inspector of monks in his home province of Khánh Hòa. During this period in central Vietnam, he was responsible for the construction of 14 temples. In 1934, he moved to southern Vietnam and traveled throughout the provinces spreading Buddhist teachings. During his time in southern Vietnam, he also spent two years in Cambodia studying the Theravada Buddhist tradition.

Upon his return from Cambodia, he oversaw the construction of a further 17 new temples during his time in the south. The last of the 31 new temples that he was responsible for constructing was the Quan The Am pagoda in the Phú Nhuận District of Gia Định Province on the outskirts of Saigon. The street on which the temple stands was later renamed Quảng Đức Street in 1975. After the temple-building phase, Quảng Đức was appointed to serve as the Chairman of the Panel on Ceremonial Rites of the Congregation of Vietnamese Monks, and as abbot of the Phuoc Hoa pagoda, which was the initial location of the Association for Buddhist Studies of Vietnam (ABSV). When the office of the ABSV was relocated to the Xá Lợi Pagoda, the main pagoda of Saigon, Quảng Đức resigned.

== Self-immolation ==
=== Religious background ===
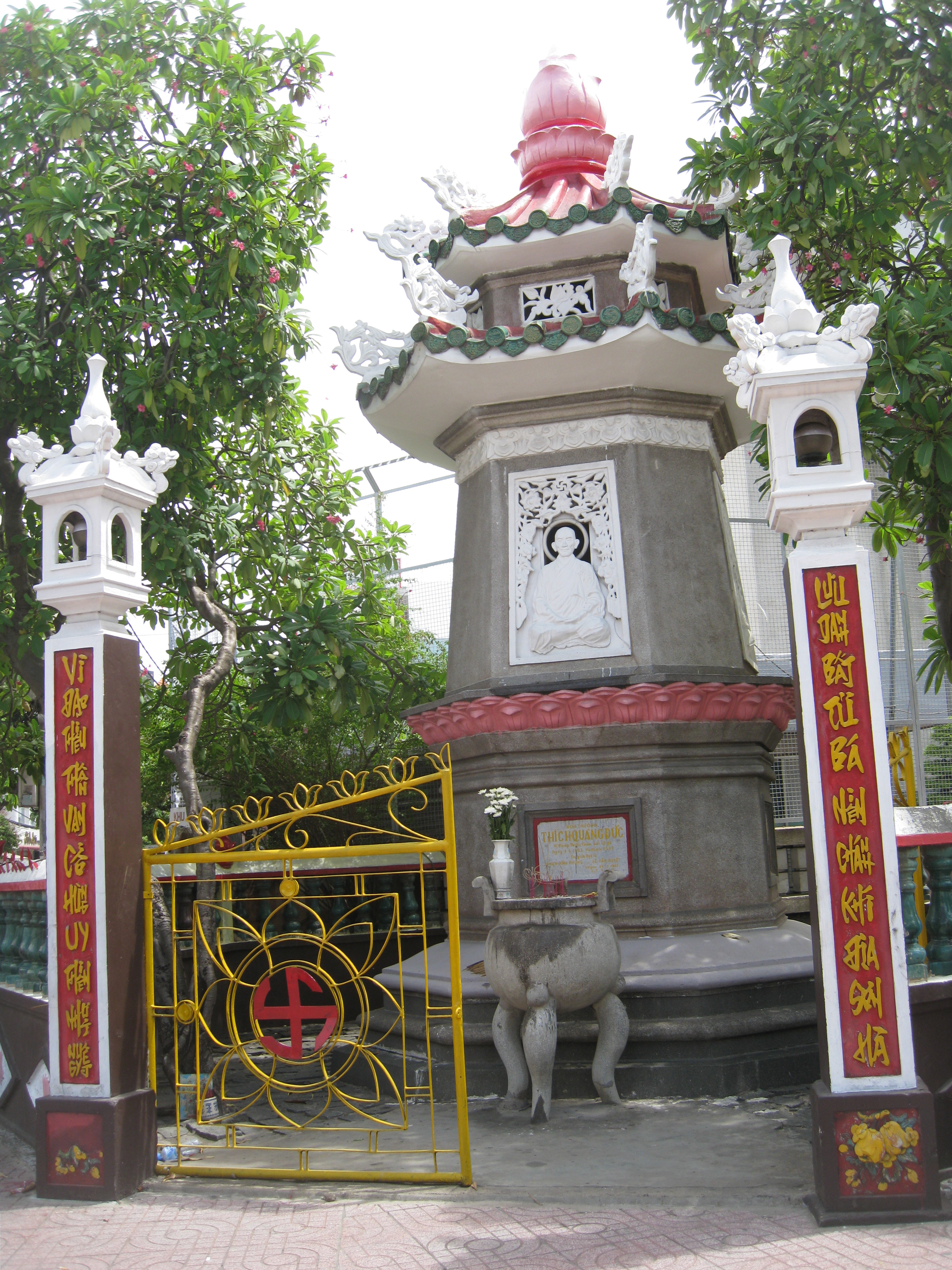
A memorial to Quảng Đức located on the site of his death

South Vietnam was often portrayed as having a Buddhist majority, comprising up to 70–80% of the population. These figures, reported by foreign journalists, were overestimated, as Westerners commonly mistook folk religion for Buddhism. The actual number of Buddhists was much smaller, at most about 27%. President Ngo Dinh Diem was then generally regarded as having pursued pro-Catholic policies that antagonized many Buddhists. The government was regarded as being biased towards Catholics in public service and military promotions, as well as the allocation of land and business favors.

The distribution of firearms to village self-defense militias intended to repel Viet Cong guerrillas allegedly saw weapons only given to Catholics. The "private" status that was imposed on Buddhism by the French, which required official permission to conduct public Buddhist activities, was not repealed by Diệm. Land owned by the Catholic Church was exempt from land reform measures. Allegedly, U.S. aid was disproportionately distributed to Catholic majority villages. Under Diệm, the Catholic Church enjoyed special exemptions in property acquisition, and in 1959, he dedicated the country to the Virgin Mary. The white and gold papal flag was allegedly flown at major public events in South Vietnam. However, portrayals by Western media at the time were distorted, as Vietnamese Buddhism in fact flourished under Diệm's First Republic.

Buddhist discontent erupted following a ban in early May on flying the Buddhist flag in Huế on Vesak, the birthday of Gautama Buddha. Just days before, Catholics had been encouraged to fly the papal flag at a celebration for Archbishop Ngô Đình Thục of Huế, Diệm's elder brother. A large crowd of Buddhists protested the ban, defying the government by flying Buddhist flags on Vesak and marching on the government broadcasting station. Government forces fired into the crowd of protesters, killing nine people. Diệm's refusal to take responsibility—he blamed the Viet Cong for the deaths—led to further Buddhist protests and calls for religious equality. As Diệm remained unwilling to comply with Buddhist demands, the frequency of protests increased.

=== Day of the act ===
Self-immolation of Thích Quảng Đức
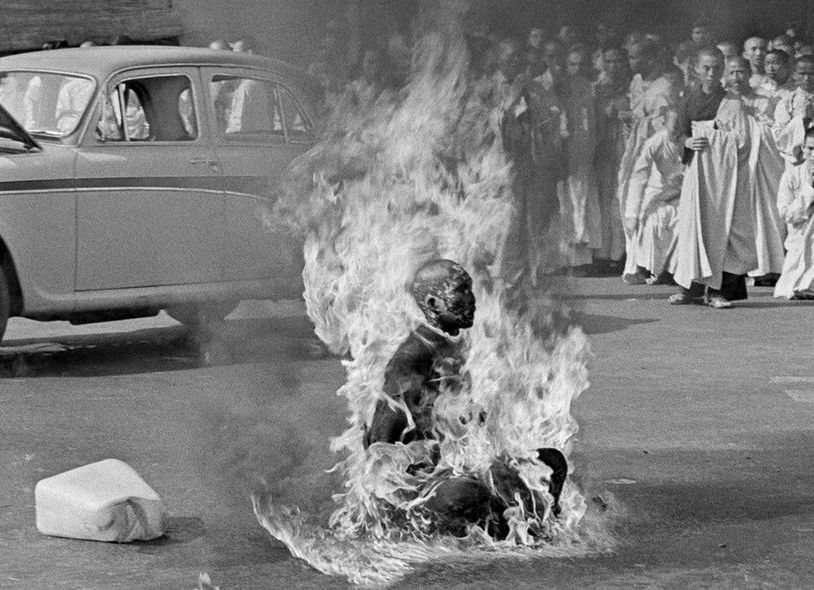
- Quảng Đức during his self-immolation. Photograph by Malcolm Browne
- Date: June 11, 1963
- Time: 9:30 a.m. (UTC+07:00)
- Duration: Approx. 0:10:00
- Location: Intersection of Nguyễn Thị Minh Khai Street and Cách Mạng Tháng Tám Street, Ward 5/6, District 3, Ho Chi Minh City, Vietnam; 10.775076°N 106.686827°E
- Type: protest, suicide by self-immolation
- Cause: Huế Phật Đản shootings, Xá Lợi Pagoda raids, Buddhist crisis, Vietnam War
- Motive: Protest against religious persecution of Buddhists by the South Vietnamese government of Ngo Dinh Diem
- First reporter: David Halberstam, Malcolm Browne
- Filmed by: Malcolm Browne (Note: 1963 World Press Photo of the Year.)
- Participants: Quang Duc and around 350 Vietnamese Mahayana Buddhist monks and nuns fellow protesters
- Outcome: 1963 South Vietnamese coup d'état, Arrest and assassination of Ngo Dinh Diem

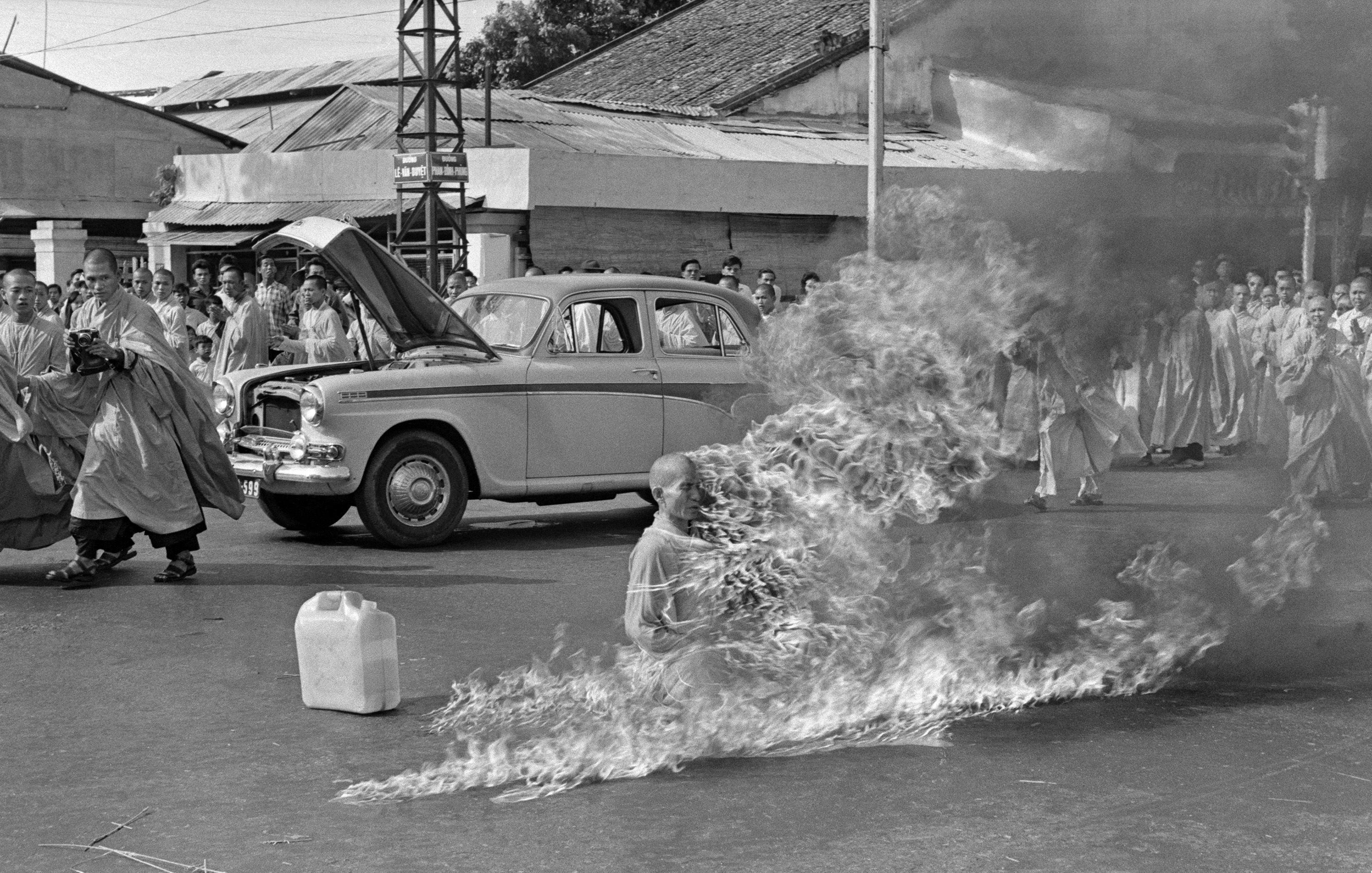
Another photograph of the scene by Browne

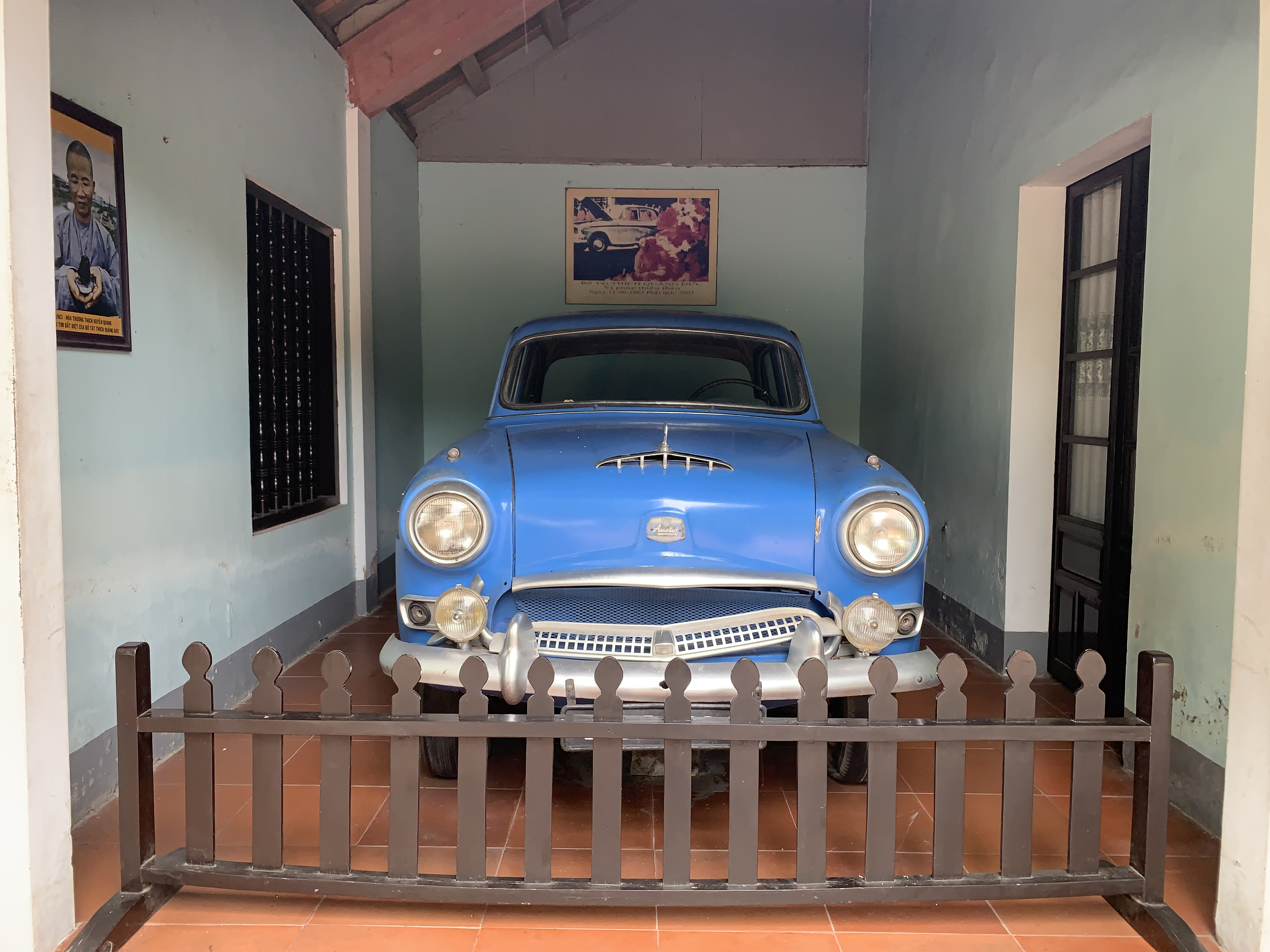
The car in which Quảng Đức traveled to his self-immolation; Huế, Thiên Mụ Pagoda

On 10 June 1963, US correspondents were informed that "something important" would happen the following morning on the road outside the Cambodian embassy in Saigon. Most of the reporters disregarded the message, since the Buddhist crisis had at that point been going on for more than a month, and the next day only a few journalists turned up, including David Halberstam of The New York Times and Malcolm Browne, the Saigon bureau chief for the Associated Press. Quảng Đức arrived as part of a procession that had begun at a nearby pagoda. Around 350 monks and nuns marched in two phalanxes, preceded by an Austin Westminster sedan, carrying banners printed in both English and Vietnamese. They denounced the Diệm government and its policy towards Buddhists, demanding that it fulfill its promises of religious equality. Another monk offered himself, but Quảng Đức's seniority prevailed.

The act occurred at the intersection of Phan Đình Phùng Boulevard (now Nguyễn Đình Chiểu Street) and Lê Văn Duyệt Street (now Cách Mạng Tháng Tám Street), a few blocks southwest of the Presidential Palace (now the Reunification Palace). Quảng Đức emerged from the car along with two other monks. One placed a cushion on the road while the second opened the trunk and took out a five-gallon petrol can. As the marchers formed a circle around him, Quảng Đức sat down in the traditional Buddhist meditative lotus position on the cushion. A colleague emptied the contents of the petrol container over Quảng Đức's head. Quảng Đức rotated a string of wooden prayer beads and recited the words Nam mô A Di Đà Phật (Vietnamese for 'homage to Amitābha') (Note: Nianfo devotional chant expressing reverence and refuge in Amitābha (A Di Đà Phật), one of the main Buddhas of Pure Land Buddhist teachings within Vietnam.) before striking a match and dropping it on himself. Flames consumed his robes and flesh, and black oily smoke emanated from his burning body.

Quảng Đức's letter written in chữ Nôm.

Quảng Đức's last words before his death were documented in a letter he had left:

Before closing my eyes and moving towards the vision of the Buddha, I respectfully plead to President Ngô Đình Diệm to take a mind of compassion towards the people of the nation and implement religious equality to maintain the strength of the homeland eternally. I call the venerables, reverends, members of the sangha and the lay Buddhists to organize in solidarity to make sacrifices to protect Buddhism.

David Halberstam wrote:

I was to see that sight again, but once was enough. Flames were coming from a human being; his body was slowly withering and shriveling up, his head blackening and charring. In the air was the smell of burning human flesh; human beings burn surprisingly quickly. Behind me I could hear the sobbing of the Vietnamese who were now gathering. I was too shocked to cry, too confused to take notes or ask questions, too bewildered to even think ... As he burned he never moved a muscle, never uttered a sound, his outward composure in sharp contrast to the wailing people around him.

The spectators were mostly stunned into silence, but some wailed and several began praying. Many of the monks and nuns, as well as some shocked passersby, prostrated themselves before the burning monk. Even some of the policemen, who had orders to control the gathered crowd, prostrated before him.

In English and Vietnamese, a monk repeated into a microphone: "A Buddhist priest burns himself to death. A Buddhist priest becomes a martyr." After approximately 10 minutes, Quảng Đức's body was fully immolated and it eventually toppled backwards onto its back. Once the fire subsided, a group of monks covered the smoking corpse with yellow robes, picked it up and tried to fit it into a coffin, but the limbs could not be straightened and one of the arms protruded from the wooden box as he was carried to the nearby Xá Lợi Pagoda in central Saigon. Outside the pagoda, students unfurled bilingual banners that read: "A Buddhist priest burns himself for our five requests."

By 1:30 p.m. around 1,000 monks had congregated inside to hold a meeting, while outside a large crowd of pro-Buddhist students had formed a human barrier around it. The meeting soon ended and all but 100 monks slowly left the compound. Nearly 1,000 monks, accompanied by laypeople, returned to the cremation site. The police lingered nearby. At around 6:00 p.m. thirty nuns and six monks were arrested for holding a prayer meeting on the street outside Xá Lợi. The police encircled the pagoda, blocking public passage and giving observers the impression that an armed siege was imminent by donning riot gear.

=== Funeral and aftermath ===
After the self-immolation, the US put more pressure on Diệm to re-open negotiations on the faltering agreement. Diệm had scheduled an emergency cabinet meeting at 11:30 a.m. on 11 June to discuss the Buddhist crisis which he had believed to be winding down. Following Quảng Đức's death, Diệm canceled the meeting and met individually with his ministers. Acting US Ambassador to South Vietnam William Trueheart warned Nguyễn Đình Thuận, Diệm's Secretary of State, of the desperate need for an agreement, saying that the situation was "dangerously near breaking point" and expected Diệm would meet the Buddhists' five-point manifesto. United States Secretary of State Dean Rusk warned the US embassy at Saigon that the White House would publicly dissociate itself from the regime if this did not occur. The Joint Communiqué and concessions to the Buddhists were signed on 16 June.

The funeral was set for 15 June. On that day 4,000 people gathered outside the Xá Lợi pagoda, only for the ceremony to be postponed. On 19 June, his remains were carried out of Xá Lợi to a cemetery 16 kilometers (9.9 miles) south of the city for a re-cremation and funeral ceremony. Following the signing of the Joint Communiqué, attendance was limited by agreement between Buddhist leaders and police to approximately 500 monks.

=== Intact heart and symbolism ===
The heart relic of Quảng Đức

Quảng Đức's body was re-cremated during the funeral, but his heart supposedly remained intact and did not burn. It was considered to be holy and placed in a glass chalice at the Xá Lợi Pagoda. The intact heart relic is regarded as a symbol of compassion. Quảng Đức has been revered by Vietnamese Buddhists as a bodhisattva (Bồ Tát), and accordingly is often referred to in Vietnamese as Bồ Tát Thích Quảng Đức. On 21 August, the ARVN Special Forces of Nhu attacked Xá Lợi and other Buddhist pagodas in Vietnam. The secret police intended to confiscate Quảng Đức's ashes, but two monks had escaped with the urn, jumping over the back fence and finding safety at the US Operations Mission next door.

The location chosen for the self-immolation, in front of the Cambodian embassy, raised questions as to whether it was coincidence or a symbolic choice. Trueheart and embassy official Charles Flowerree felt that the location was selected to show solidarity with the Cambodian government of Prince Norodom Sihanouk. South Vietnam and Cambodia had strained relations: in a speech on 22 May, Sihanouk had accused Diệm of mistreating Vietnamese and ethnic minority Khmer Buddhists. The pro-Diệm Times of Vietnam published an article on 9 June which claimed that Cambodian monks had been encouraging the Buddhist crisis, asserting it was part of a Cambodian plot to extend its neutralist foreign policy into South Vietnam. Flowerree noted that Diệm was "ready and eager to see a fine Cambodian hand in all the organized Buddhist actions".

=== Diệm's reaction ===
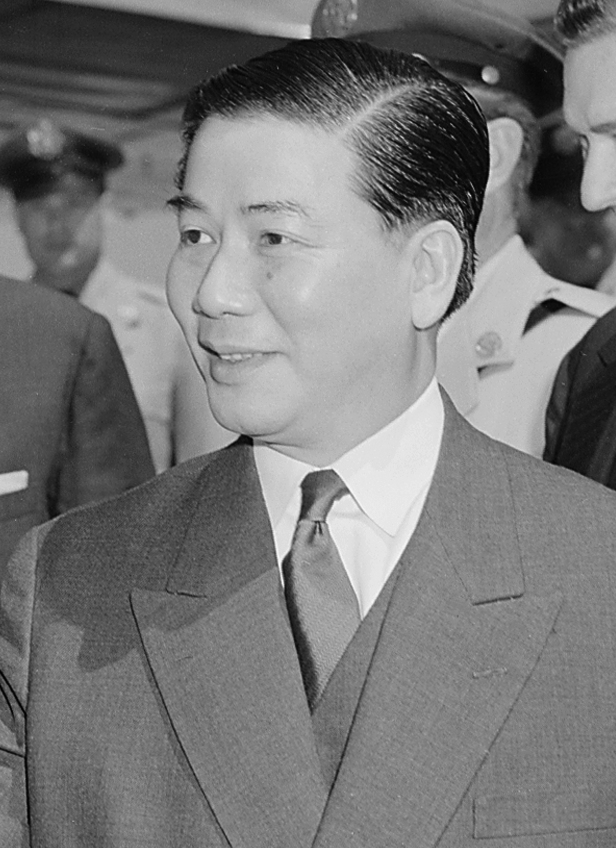
Ngô Đình Diệm

Diệm made a radio address at 19:00 on the day of Quảng Đức's death, asserting that he was profoundly troubled by the event. He appealed for "serenity and patriotism", and promised that stalled negotiations would resume with the Buddhists. He asserted that negotiations had been progressing well and in a time of religious tension emphasized the role of the Catholic philosophy of personalism in his rule. He alleged that extremists had twisted the facts and he asserted that the Buddhists can "count on the Constitution, in other words, me".

The ARVN responded to the appeal, putting on a show of solidarity behind Diệm to isolate dissident officers. Thirty high-ranking officers headed by General Lê Văn Tỵ declared their resolve to carry out all missions entrusted to the army for the defense of the constitution and the Republic. The declaration was a veneer which masked a developing plot to oust Diệm. Some of the signatories were to become personally involved in Diệm's overthrow and death in November. Generals Dương Văn Minh and Trần Văn Đôn, the presidential military advisor and the chief of the army who were to lead the coup, were overseas.

Madame Nhu (a Catholic convert and the wife of Diệm's younger brother and chief adviser Ngô Đình Nhu), who was regarded as the First Lady of South Vietnam at the time (as Diệm was a bachelor), said she would "clap hands at seeing another monk barbecue show". Later that month, Diệm's government charged that Quảng Đức had been drugged before being forced to die by suicide. The regime also accused Browne of bribing Quảng Đức to burn himself.

=== Political and media impact ===
Photographs taken by Malcolm Browne of the self-immolation quickly spread across the wire services and were featured on the front pages of newspapers worldwide. The self-immolation was later regarded as a turning point in the Buddhist crisis and a critical point in the collapse of the Diệm regime.

Historian Seth Jacobs asserted that Quảng Đức had "reduced America's Diệm experiment to ashes as well" and that "no amount of pleading could retrieve Diệm's reputation" once Browne's images had become ingrained into the psyche of the world public. Ellen Hammer described the event as having "evoked dark images of persecution and horror corresponding to a profoundly Asian reality that passed the understanding of Westerners." John Mecklin, an official from the US embassy, noted that the photograph "had a shock effect of incalculable value to the Buddhist cause, becoming a symbol of the state of things in Vietnam." William Colby, then chief of the CIA's Far East Division, opined that Diệm "handled the Buddhist crisis fairly badly and allowed it to grow. But I really don't think there was much they could have done about it once that bonze burned himself."

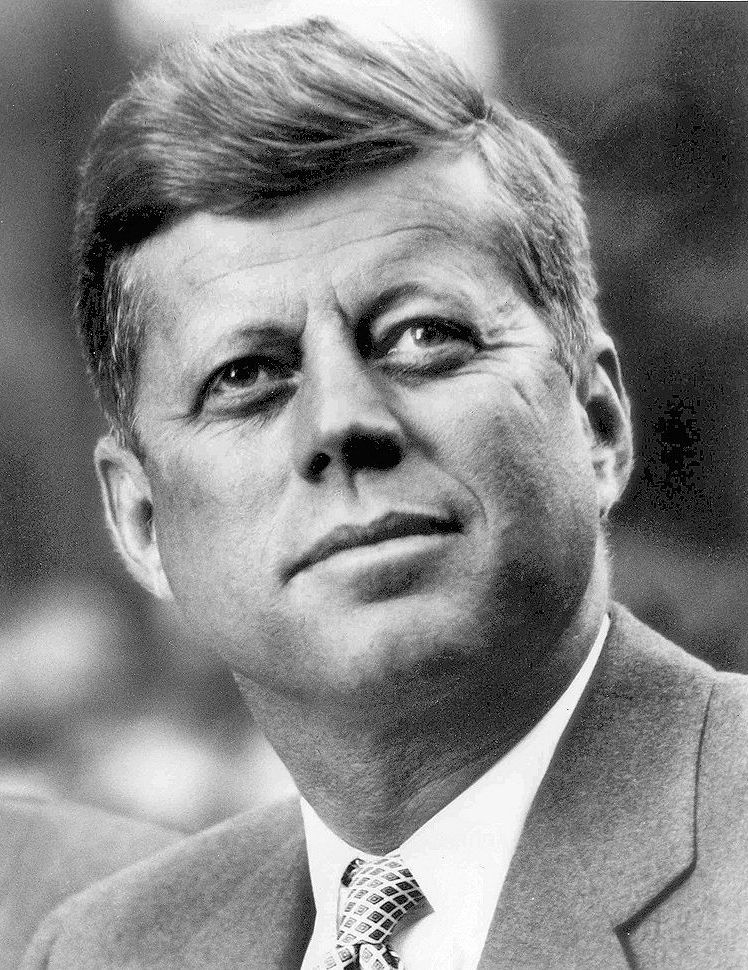
US President John F. Kennedy said that "no news picture in history has generated so much emotion around the world as that one".

President John F. Kennedy, whose government was the main sponsor of Diệm's regime, learned of Quảng Đức's death when handed the morning newspapers while he was talking to his brother, Attorney General Robert F. Kennedy, on the phone. Kennedy reportedly interrupted their conversation about segregation in Alabama by exclaiming "Jesus Christ!" He later remarked that "no news picture in history has generated so much emotion around the world as that one". US Senator Frank Church (D-Idaho), a member of the Senate Foreign Relations Committee, claimed that "such grisly scenes have not been witnessed since the Christian martyrs marched hand in hand into the Roman arenas."

In Europe, the photographs were sold on the streets as postcards during the 1960s, and China distributed millions of copies of the photograph throughout Asia and Africa as evidence of what it called US imperialism. One of Browne's photographs remains affixed to the sedan in which Quảng Đức was riding and is part of a tourist attraction in Huế. For Browne and the AP, the pictures were a marketing success. Ray Herndon, the United Press International (UPI) correspondent who had forgotten to take his camera on the day, was harshly criticized in private by his employer. UPI estimated that 5,000 readers in Sydney, then a city of around 1.5–2 million, had switched to AP news sources.

Diệm's English-language mouthpiece, the Times of Vietnam, intensified its attacks on both journalists and Buddhists. Headlines such as "Xá Lợi politburo makes new threats" and "Monks plot murder" were printed. One article questioned the relationship between the monks and the press by posing the question as to why "so many young girls are buzzing in and out of Xá Lợi early [in the day]" and then going on to allege that they were brought in for sexual purposes for the US reporters.

=== Precedents and influence ===
The practice of Vietnamese monks immolating themselves has many historical precedents. Instances of self-immolations in Vietnam had been recorded for centuries, usually carried out to honor Gautama Buddha. The most recently recorded case before 1963 was in North Vietnam in 1950. The French colonial authorities had tried to eradicate the practice after their conquest of Vietnam in the nineteenth century, but failed. In the 1920s, they prevented one monk from setting fire to himself in Huế, but he starved himself to death instead. During the 1920s and 1930s, Saigon newspapers reported multiple instances of self-immolations by monks in a matter-of-fact style. The practice had also been seen in the Chinese city of Harbin in 1948 when a monk sat down in the lotus position on a pile of sawdust and soybean oil and set fire to himself in protest against the treatment of Buddhism by the anti-religious communists of Mao Zedong. His heart remained intact, as did that of Quảng Đức.

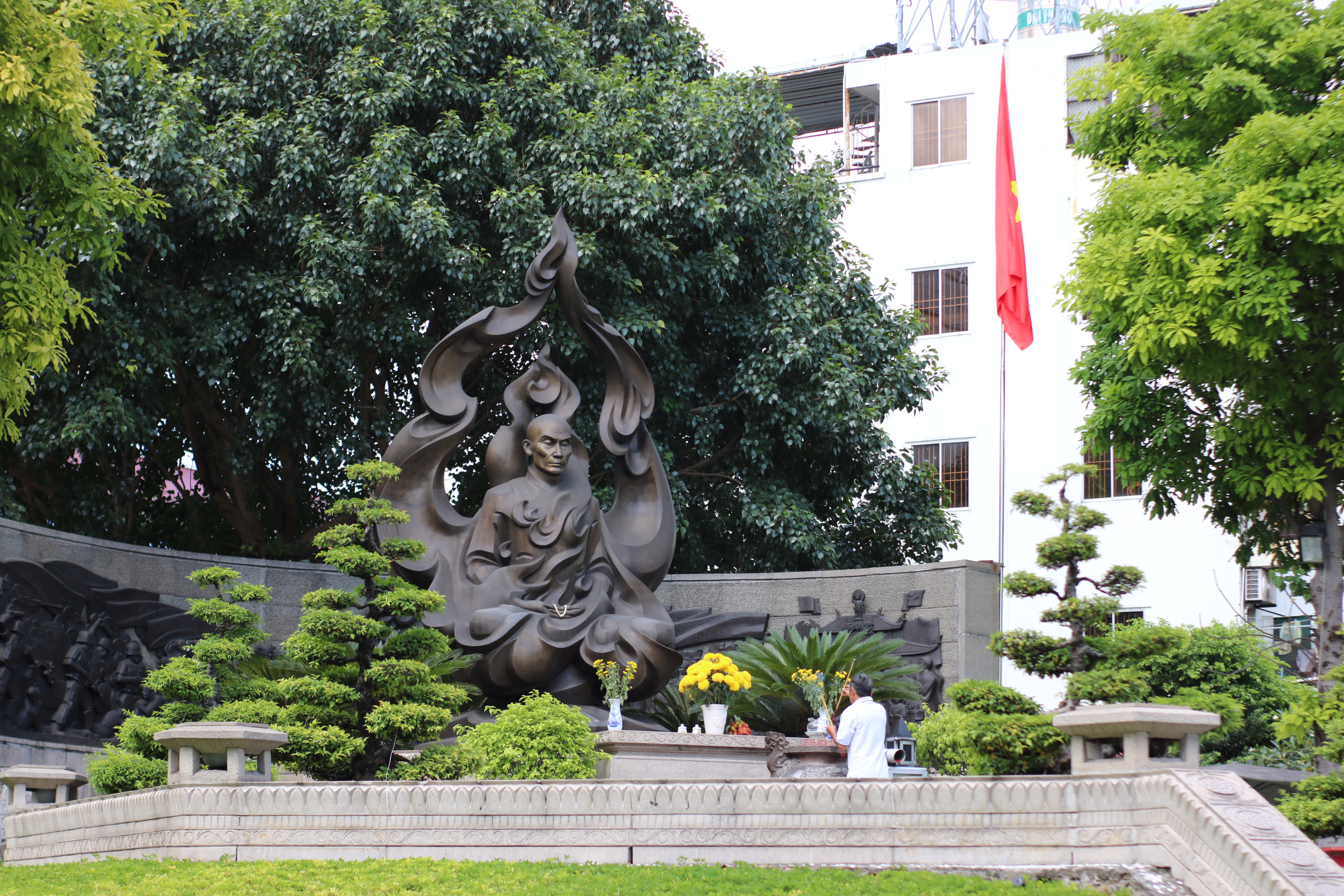
The Venerable Thich Quảng Đức Monument at the intersection where Quảng Đức performed his self-immolation, Phan Đình Phùng (now Nguyễn Đình Chiểu) Street and Lê Văn Duyệt (now Cách Mạng Tháng Tám) Street

After Quảng Đức, five more Buddhist monks immolated themselves up until late October 1963 as the Buddhist protests in Vietnam escalated. On 1 November, the ARVN overthrew Diệm in a coup. Diệm and Nhu were assassinated the next day. Monks have followed Quảng Đức's example since for other reasons.

John Mecklin, the Public Affairs Officer at the US Embassy in Saigon from 1962 to 1964, claimed about the situation and the broader political turmoil that "Neither the Vietnamese nor the Americans understood what was happening nor what to do about it [...]. There were Americans who made jokes about "bonze fires' or 'hot cross bonzes' or 'Buddhist cookouts,' almost as an escape mechanism."

In one instance in 1963, the young son of an American officer based at the Saigon US Embassy doused himself with gasoline and set himself on fire. He was seriously burned before the fire was extinguished and later said "I wanted to see what it was like." Thích Quảng Đức's actions were fatally copied in the United States in protest against the Vietnam War. On 16 March 1965, Alice Herz, an 82-year-old peace activist, immolated herself in front of the Federal Department Store in northwest Detroit. Later that same year, Norman Morrison, a 31-year-old Quaker pacifist, poured kerosene over himself and set light to himself below the third-floor window of Secretary of Defense Robert McNamara at the Pentagon on 2 November 1965. A week later, Catholic Worker Movement member Roger Allen LaPorte did the same thing in front of the United Nations in New York City.

In 1992, one of Browne's photographs of the event was used as the cover art for American rap metal band Rage Against the Machine's eponymous debut album.

== See also ==
- List of civil rights leaders
- List of political self-immolations
- Evelyn McHale

== Bibliography ==
- Browne, Malcolm (1963), World Press Photo 1963, Amsterdam: World Press Photo, archived from the original on 19 October 2007
- Buswell Jr., Robert E.; Lopez Jr., Donald S. (2013), The Princeton Dictionary of Buddhism, Princeton University Press, ISBN 978-1-4008-4805-8
- Buttinger, Joseph (1967), Vietnam: A Dragon Embattled, Praeger Publishers
- Dung, Thay Phap (2006), "A Letter to Friends about our Lineage" (PDF), PDF file on the Order of Interbeing website
- Ellsberg, Daniel, ed. (10 July 1963), "The Situation in South Vietnam – SNIE 53-2-63", The Pentagon Papers, Gravel Edition, vol. 2, Boston: Beacon Press, archived from the original on 9 November 2017
- Fall, Bernard (1963), The Two Viet-Nams, Praeger Publishers
- Gettleman, Marvin E. (1966), Vietnam: History, documents and opinions on a major world crisis, New York: Penguin Books
- Halberstam, David (1965), The Making of a Quagmire, New York: Random House, ISBN 9780345357779
- Hammer, Ellen J. (1987), A Death in November: America in Vietnam, 1963, New York City: E. P. Dutton, ISBN 0-525-24210-4
- Harrison, Gilbert, ed. (1963a), "Diem's other crusade", The New Republic, no. 22 June 1963
- Harrison, Gilbert, ed. (1963b), "South Vietnam: Whose funeral pyre?", The New Republic, no. 29 June 1963, p. 9
- Jacobs, Seth (2006), Cold War Mandarin: Ngo Dinh Diem and the Origins of America's War in Vietnam, 1950–1963, Lanham: Rowman & Littlefield, ISBN 0-7425-4447-8
- Jones, Howard (2003), Death of a Generation: how the assassinations of Diem and JFK prolonged the Vietnam War, New York: Oxford University Press, ISBN 0-19-505286-2
- Karnow, Stanley (1997), Vietnam: A history, New York: Penguin Books, ISBN 0-670-84218-4
- Langguth, A. J. (2002), Our Vietnam: the war, 1954–1975, New York: Simon & Schuster, ISBN 0-7432-1231-2
- Minh, Huỳnh (2006), Gia Định Xưa [Old Family] (in Vietnamese), Ho Chi Minh City: Văn Hóa-Thông Tin Publishing House
- Moyar, Mark (2006). Triumph Forsaken: The Vietnam War, 1954–1965. New York City: Cambridge University Press. ISBN 0-521-86911-0.
- Tạng, Thích Nguyên (1 May 2005), Tiểu Sử Bổ Tát Thích Quảng Dức [Biography of Bodhisattva Thich Quang Duc] (in Vietnamese), Fawker: Quảng Đức Monastery
- Prochnau, William (1995), Once upon a Distant War, New York: Times Books, ISBN 0-8129-2633-1
- Schecter, Jerrod L. (1967), The New Face of Buddha: Buddhism and Political Power in Southeast Asia, New York: Coward-McCann
- Shaw, Geoffrey (2015), The Lost Mandate of Heaven: The American Betrayal of Ngo Dinh Diem, President of Vietnam, San Francisco: Ignatius Press, ISBN 978-1-58617-935-9
- Tucker, Spencer C. (2000), Encyclopedia of the Vietnam War, Santa Barbara: ABC-CLIO, ISBN 1-57607-040-9
- Unattributed (14 June 1963a), "The Religious Crisis", Time Magazine, no. 14 June 1963
- Unattributed (30 August 1963b), "The Crackdown", Time Magazine, no. 30 August 1963, archived from the original on 13 July 2007
- Warner, Denis (1963), The Last Confucian, New York: Macmillan
- Zinn, Howard (2003), A People's History of the United States, New York: HarperCollins, ISBN 0-06-052842-7
