= Vạn Ninh district =

Coordinates: 12.750°N 109.167°E

Vạn Ninh District Huyện Vạn Ninh
- District
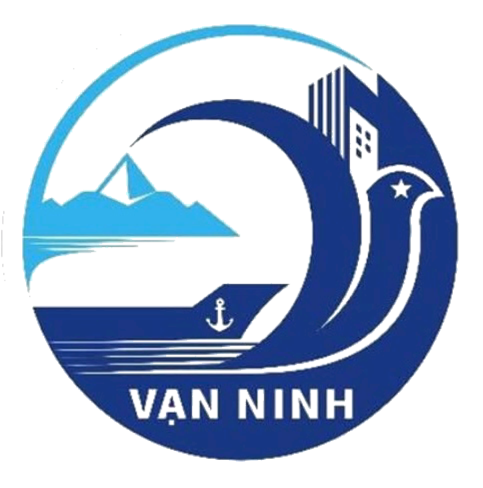
- Seal
- Interactive map of Vạn Ninh District
- Country: Vietnam
- Region: South Central Coast
- Province: Khánh Hòa
- Capital: Vạn Giã

Area
  - Total: 210 sq mi (550 km^{2})

Population (2003)
  - Total: 126,805
- Time zone: UTC+7 (Indochina Time)

Vạn Ninh is a former rural district of Khánh Hòa province in the South Central Coast region of Vietnam.

== Geography ==
Vạn Ninh is the northernmost district of Khánh Hòa. Vạn Ninh has the following communes, from north to south: Đại Lãnh, Vạn Thọ, Vạn Thạnh, Vạn Phước, Vạn Long, Vạn Bình, Vạn Khánh, Vạn Phú, Vạn Lương, Xuân Sơn, Vạn Hưng and Vạn Thắng. It is bordered to the north by Phú Yên province, and to the south by Ninh Hòa. It contains the easternmost point of mainland Vietnam. East of Vạn Ninh is Vân Phong bay (South China Sea).

As of 2003 the district had a population of 126,805. The district covers an area of 550 km^{2} (210 sq mi). The district capital lies at Vạn Giã.

== Notable people from Vạn Ninh ==
- Thích Quảng Đức
