= Malcolm Browne =

American photographer and journalist (1931–2012)

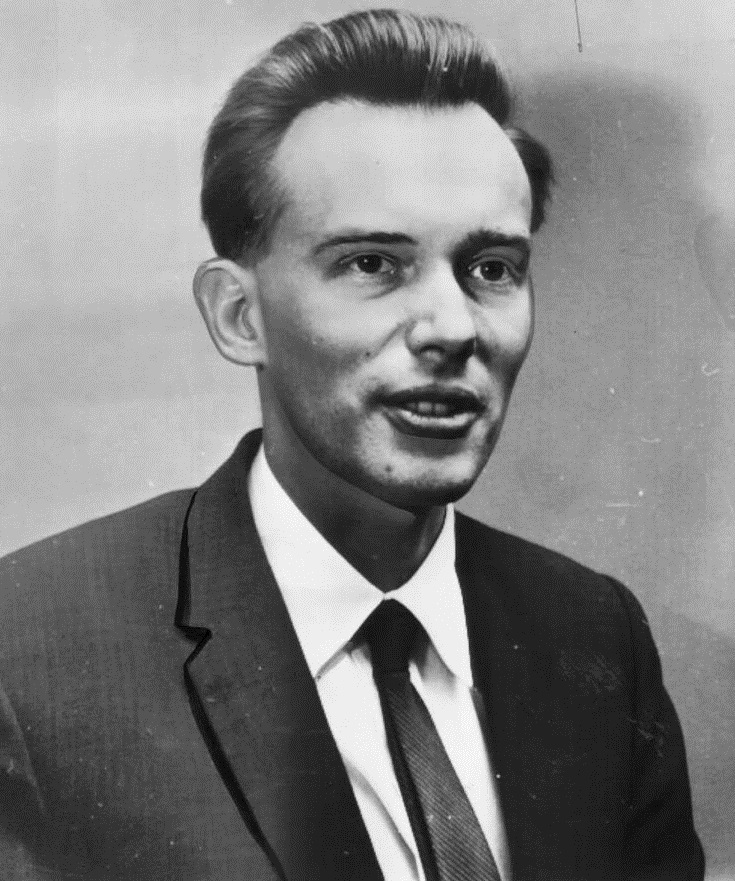
- Browne in 1964
- Born: Malcolm Wilde Browne; April 17, 1931; New York City, U.S.
- Died: August 27, 2012 (aged 81); Hanover, New Hampshire, U.S.
- Education: Swarthmore College
- Occupations: Journalist, photographer
- Spouse: Le Lieu
- Children: 2

Malcolm Wilde Browne (April 17, 1931 – August 27, 2012) was an American journalist and photographer, best known for his award-winning photograph of the self-immolation of Buddhist monk Thích Quảng Đức in 1963.

== Early life and education ==
Browne was born and raised in New York City. His mother was a Quaker with fervently anti-war opinions, while his father was an architect who was Roman Catholic. Browne attended Friends Seminary, a Quaker school in Manhattan, from kindergarten through to twelfth grade. He later attended Swarthmore College in Pennsylvania and studied chemistry.

== Career ==
Browne's career in journalism began when he was drafted into the U.S. Army during the Korean War. He was assigned to the Pacific edition of the Stars and Stripes, where he worked for two years. He worked for the Middletown Times Herald-Record, then joined the Associated Press (AP). He worked in Baltimore from 1959 until 1961, at which point he was made chief correspondent for Indochina. On June 11, 1963, he took his famous photographs of the death of Thích Quảng Đức, a Vietnamese Mahayana Buddhist monk who burned himself to death at a busy road intersection in Saigon, in protest against the persecution of Buddhists by the South Vietnamese government led by Ngô Đình Diệm. He won a Pulitzer Prize for International Reporting and received many job offers, eventually leaving the AP in 1965.

Browne worked for ABC TV for about a year but became dissatisfied with television journalism, and worked freelance for several years. He did a year's fellowship at Columbia University with the Council on Foreign Relations. In 1968, he joined The New York Times, becoming its correspondent for South America in 1972. Having worked as a chemist prior to becoming a journalist, in 1977 Browne became a science writer, serving as a senior editor for Discover. He returned to the Times in 1985 and went on to cover the Persian Gulf War in 1991.

== Family and personal life ==
Malcolm Browne was a distant relative of the Irish writer Oscar Wilde; his grandfather was the writer's cousin. His mother professed pacifist views and belonged to the Quaker community, his father worked as an architect and practiced Catholicism.

The correspondent was married three times, meeting his third wife in 1961 while she was working for the Saigon government's Ministry of Information. The couple married five years later and had two children.

== Death ==
Browne died in Hanover, New Hampshire, on August 27, 2012, of complications from Parkinson's disease. He was 81 years old.

== Awards and recognition ==
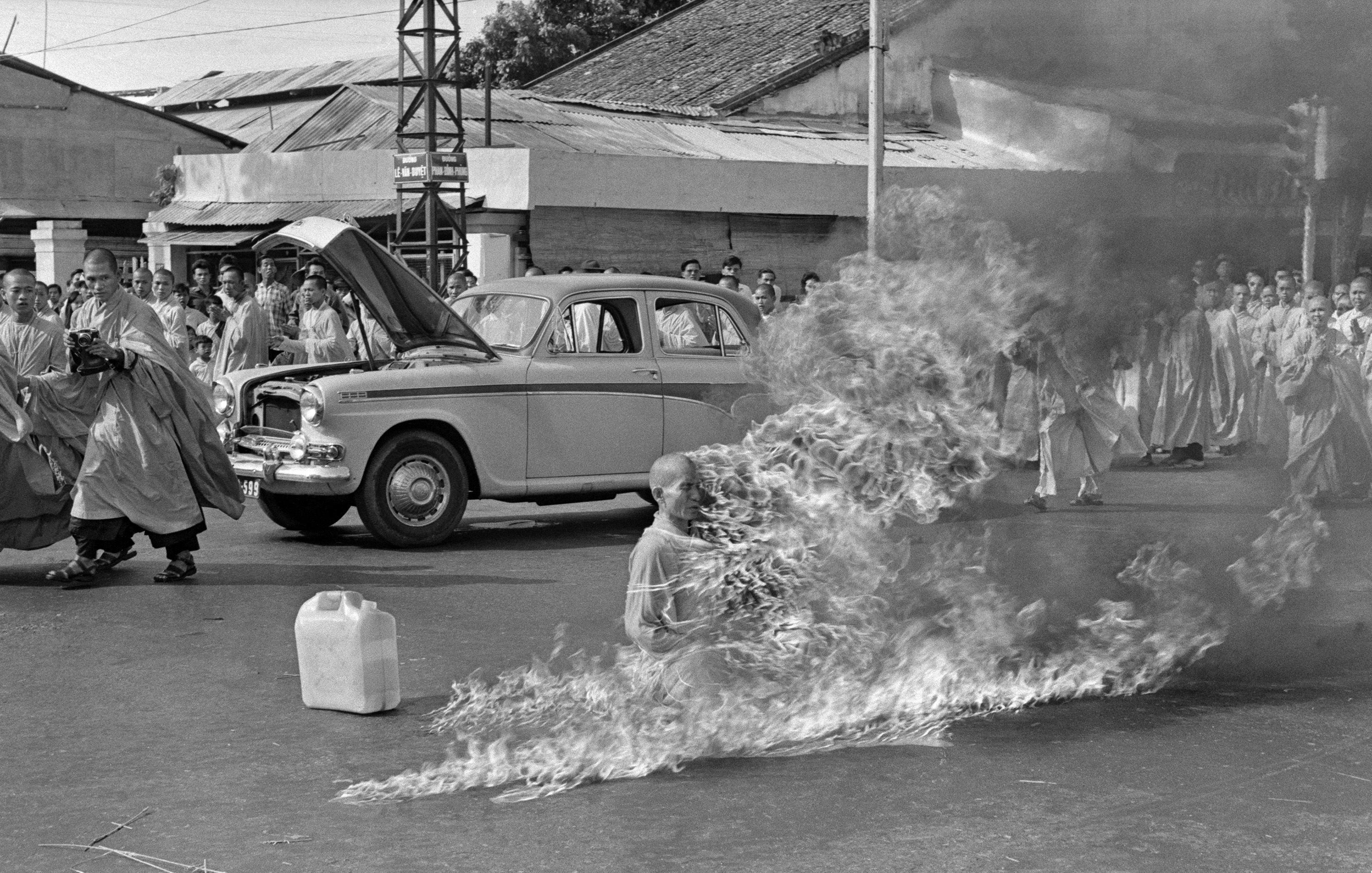
Browne's photo of Thích Quảng Đức's self-immolation, during which he remained perfectly still. "I just kept shooting and shooting and shooting and that protected me from the horror of the thing."

- World Press Photo of the Year (1963)
- Pulitzer Prize for International Reporting (1964)
- George Polk award for courage in journalism
- Overseas Press Club Award
- James T. Grady-James H. Stack Award for Interpreting Chemistry for the Public, American Chemical Society (1992)
- Honorary Member, Sigma Xi (2002)

== Works ==
- Browne, Malcolm W. Muddy Boots and Red Socks, Random House: New York, 1993, ISBN 0-8129-6352-0 (autobiography)
- Saigon's Finale (article on U.S. military defeat in Vietnam)
- The New Face of War (Bobbs-Merrill, Indianapolis, 1965) ISBN 0-553-25894-X. Ground-breaking account of tactics in the Vietnam War.
