= Norman Morrison =

American anti–Vietnam War protester (1933–1965)

- Born: December 29, 1933; Erie, Pennsylvania, U.S.
- Died: November 2, 1965 (aged 31); The Pentagon, Arlington County, Virginia, U.S.
- Cause of death: Immolated himself to protest American involvement in the Vietnam War
- Education: College of Wooster
- Spouse: Anne Welsh
- Children: 3

Norman R. Morrison (December 29, 1933 – November 2, 1965) was an American anti-war activist. On November 2, 1965, Morrison doused himself in kerosene and set himself on fire below the office of Secretary of Defense Robert McNamara at the Pentagon to protest United States involvement in the Vietnam War, leading to his death. This action was inspired by photographs of Vietnamese children burned by napalm bombings, and may have been inspired by Thích Quảng Đức and other Buddhist monks, who burned themselves to death to protest the repression committed by the South Vietnam government of Catholic President Ngo Dinh Diem.

== Background ==
Morrison was born in Erie, Pennsylvania, and was raised Presbyterian. At 13, his family moved to Chautauqua, New York, where Morrison joined the Boy Scouts of America and entered the God and Country Program, becoming the youngest BSA member in Chautauqua County to earn a God and Country award. Morrison graduated from the College of Wooster in 1956. He had gained an interest in the Quakers and their ideals, but continued to attend Presbyterian seminars in Pittsburgh and at the University of Edinburgh in Scotland. Morrison became a member of the Religious Society of Friends in 1959 and by 1965, he worked for Stony Run Friends Meeting in Baltimore as its Executive Secretary. As an ardent believer in the principle of pacifism, he condemned the actions of the U.S. military in the Vietnam War.

Six months before the act, on March 9, President of the United States Lyndon B. Johnson had authorized the use of napalm in the Vietnam War, which, by the end of the war, would end up killing at least 50,000 civilians in airstrikes. This decision had spurred fellow Quaker and peace activist Alice Herz to set herself on fire in an open street in Detroit, Michigan, on March 16 of the same year, in similar vein as Thích Quảng Đức had done in 1963. At the time of his death, Morrison was married to Anne Welsh, also a Quaker, with whom he had two daughters and a son.

== Death ==
Morrison took his daughter Emily, then one year of age, to the Pentagon, and either set her down or handed her off to someone in the crowd before setting himself ablaze. He died within two minutes of leaving in an ambulance for Fort Myer.

Morrison's reasons for taking Emily are not entirely known. However, Morrison's wife Anne later recalled, "Whether he thought of it that way or not, I think having Emily with him was a final and great comfort to Norman... [S]he was a powerful symbol of the children we were killing with our bombs and napalm – who didn't have parents to hold them in their arms."

In a letter he mailed to Welsh, Morrison reassured her of the faith in his act. "Know that I love thee ... but I must go to help the children of the priest's village". McNamara described Morrison's death as "a tragedy not only for his family but also for me and the country. It was an outcry against the killing that was destroying the lives of so many Vietnamese and American youth." He was survived by Anne Welsh and their three children, Ben (who died of cancer in 1976), then 6, Christina, then 5, and Emily.

== Legacy ==
Morrison was seen as devout and sincere in sacrificing himself for a cause greater than himself. In Vietnam, Morrison quickly became a folk hero to some, his name rendered as Mo Ri Xon. Five days after Morrison died, Vietnamese poet Tố Hữu wrote a poem, "Emily, My Child", assuming the voice of Morrison addressing his daughter Emily and telling her the reasons for his sacrifice.

One week after Morrison, Roger Allen LaPorte performed a similar act in New York City, in front of the United Nations building. On May 9, 1967, as part of the start to the 1967 Pentagon camp-in, demonstrators held a vigil for Morrison, before occupying the Pentagon for four days until being removed and arrested.

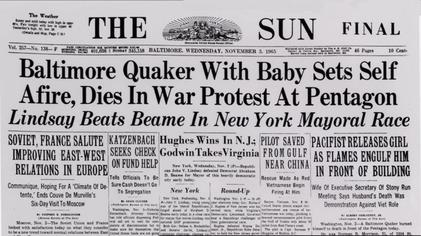
Newspaper – The Sun (Baltimore)

Morrison's widow, Anne, and the couple's two daughters visited Vietnam in 1999, where they met with Tố Hữu, the poet who had written the popular poem "Emily, My Child". Anne Morrison Welsh recounts the visit and her husband's tragedy in her monograph, Fire of the Heart: Norman Morrison's Legacy In Vietnam And At Home.

On his visit to the United States in 2007, President of Vietnam Nguyễn Minh Triết visited a site on the Potomac near the place where Morrison immolated himself and read the poem by Tố Hữu to commemorate Morrison.

== Cultural depictions ==
Filmmaker Errol Morris interviewed Secretary McNamara at length on camera in his documentary film, The Fog of War, in which McNamara says, "[Morrison] came to the Pentagon, doused himself with gasoline. Burned himself to death below my office ... his wife issued a very moving statement – 'human beings must stop killing other human beings' – and that's a belief that I shared, I shared it then, I believe it even more strongly today". McNamara then posits, "How much evil must we do in order to do good? We have certain ideals, certain responsibilities. Recognize that at times you will have to engage in evil, but minimize it."

Morrison's self-immolation at the Pentagon is depicted in the 2002 HBO drama Path to War, with Morrison being played by Victor Slezak.

In the omnibus French documentary, Far from Vietnam (1967), Morrison's widow Anne Welsh appears with her young children in a segment directed by William Klein. Welsh describes the circumstances of her husband's death and expresses approval of his act. This footage is interspersed with an interview with a Vietnamese expatriate, Ann Uyen, living in Paris, who describes what Morrison's sacrifice meant to the Vietnamese people.

== Memorials ==
In the Vietnamese cities of Đà Nẵng and Hồ Chí Minh City, a road is named after Morrison (albeit misspelt as 'Morison' in Ho Chi Minh City). North Vietnam named a Hanoi street after him, and issued a postage stamp in his honor. Possession of the stamp was prohibited in the United States due to the U.S. embargo against North Vietnam.

== See also ==
- Florence Beaumont
- George Winne, Jr.
- Nhat Chi Mai
- Aaron Bushnell
