= Angela Taylor (athlete) =

American track and field athlete and coach born 1965

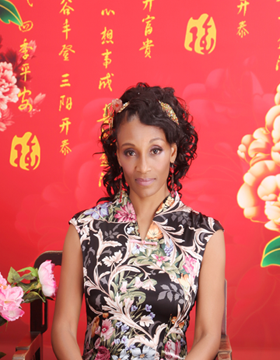
Angela Taylor

Angela Taylor (born March 16, 1965) is a retired American athlete and collegiate coach. She earned nine Gateway titles at Illinois State University. She was a three-time indoor long jump champion and won the 60-meter high hurdles in 1987. In her post-collegiate athletic career, she competed against Jackie Joyner-Kersee in the women's heptathlon and was a member of various U.S. national teams and a finalist in the heptathlon in the 1992 Olympics trials. She finished 1992 ranked 30th in the world.

After retiring as a competitive athlete, Angela Taylor coached Women's cross country and track and field from 1990 to 2008 at various universities. She has been affiliated with the USA Track and Field (USATF) National Governing Body since 1992. She was officially inducted in the Hall of Fame on October 18, 2008 at Illinois State University.

Angela Taylor is CEO and Co-Founder of a company called Hepta 7291.

== Education ==
Angela Taylor attended college at Illinois State University, where she starred in track and field from 1983–1987. She was a nine-time Gateway Conference champion during her four years as a member of the Illinois State Redbirds. She earned nine Gateway titles at Illinois State, four coming during the indoor season and five as a member of the outdoor team. She was a three-time indoor long jump champion and won the 60-meter high hurdles in 1987. As part of the Illinois State Redbirds outdoor team, Angela Taylor claimed three long jump titles in addition to her championship in the 100-meter dash and hurdles events in her senior year. She served as team captain and also picked up Most Valuable Track and Field honors.

Angela Taylor held two Illinois State outdoor track and field records. Her 100-meter hurdles (13.61) record stood for 31 years before it was broken in 2018, while her long jump record (20-05.75) lasted for 32 years until it was broken in 2019.

Angela Taylor went on to expand her education by obtaining a Master’s in Public Administration from George Mason University, Fairfax VA and completed a PhD in Leadership in Higher Education from Capella University.

== Career ==
Dr. Angela Taylor began her coaching career at Louisiana State University working in the athletic department under Joe Dean. After leaving Louisiana State University she worked as a coach at various universities such as: University of Minnesota, Princeton University, and George Mason University.

She has also had the opportunity to lead the USA Track and Field International teams since 1997. Some of the International teams led by Angela Taylor are listed below. She has worked as a consultant for AAC USA Track and Field Olympics Trials in 2000, 2004, and 2008.

=== 2018 Lecturer and Head Men's and Women's Track & Field Coach, Alfred University ===
At Alfred University, Dr. Angela Taylor was responsible for all facets of the track and field program, including training, recruiting, budgets, practices, scheduling, competitions, travel, accommodations, and supervising support staff. She co-developed the Foundations of Wellness and is also a Lecturer where she is teaching the course at Alfred University. Her research interest areas include Extended reality (XR) for advancing teaching, learning, for students or athletes.

Publications: An Examination of the Relationships between Agile Leadership Factors and Curriculum Reform in Higher Education, and Principles of Wellness – 7 Principles of Wellness for Healthy Life.

=== 2013 National High Performance Director, Federal Republic of Nigeria ===
Dr. Angela Taylor led and developed the high performance 2014-2016 strategic plan, policy development and operational leadership for all aspects of Nigerian Athletics High Performance Programs in the Federal Republic of Nigeria. She led Team Nigeria athletes and coaches that competed at Olympic Games, World Championships, Commonwealth Games and African championship Games during that period. Responsible for assisting with competition operation matters for the Nigerian National Team such as undertaking site visits and Youth championship venues as well as FIFA World Cup Qualifiers. Organized Youth basketball competitions throughout Nigeria. Acted as Talent Scout placing several Nigerian Female Youth basketball players with High School and College Basketball Programs in the United States. Implemented the competition regulations/statutes and policies. Developed a working relationship to secure Team Nigeria National Team Apparel with PEAK, INC of China 2015-2017 and added over 2 million dollars in additional revenue.

=== 2011 Pan American Games ===
Angela Taylor was the USA Head Coach for the Pan American team in Guadalajara, Mexico.

=== 2006 World Junior Championships in Athletics ===
Angela Taylor was part of the World Junior Championships in Athletics team in Beijing, China.

=== 2005 IAAF World Championships ===
Angela Taylor was part of the support IAAF World Championships team in Helsinki, Finland.

=== 2003 IAAF World Championships ===
Angela Taylor was the USA Head Coach for the IAAF World Championships team in Paris, France. She led the Women’s USA team to win a Gold Medal in the 4x4 meter relay.

=== 2002 World Cup ===
Angela Taylor was the USA Head Manager for the World Cup team in Madrid, Spain.

=== 2001 Goodwill Games ===
Angela Taylor was the USA Team Support for the Goodwill Games team in Brisbane, Australia.

=== 1999 IAAF World Championships ===
Angela Taylor was the USA Team Support for the IAAF World Championships team in Seville, Spain.

=== 1999 Indoor IAAF World Championships ===
Angela Taylor was the USA Assistant Manager for the Indoor IAAF World Championships team in Maeboshi, Japan.

=== 1998 World Cup ===
Angela Taylor was the USA Team Support for the World Cup Team which was the Champions in Johannesburg, South Africa.

=== 1997 Junior Pan American ===
Angela Taylor was the USA Head Manager for the Junior Pan American team in Havana, Cuba.
