= Randy Hembrey =

American racing executive

- Hembrey in 2012
- Born: Randall J. Hembrey; 26 June 1965 (age 60); Cary, Illinois, U.S.

Randy Hembrey (born June 26, 1965) is the Director of Road Racing for the United States Auto Club (USAC) in the newly formed Road Racing division. Previously, Hembrey served as the Race Director for the SRO Motorsports Group and directed the GT World Challenge America during the 2020 and 2021 seasons.

Hembrey, who was born in Cary, Illinois, previously served as the Series Director for the International Motor Sports Association, and also served as a Race Director for the IndyCar Road to Indy ladder series during their rising years. From running USF2000 through their additional ownership of Pro Mazda and Indy Lights, Hembrey has worked in the industry since 1979 and founded Comp8 Motorsports, a professional motorsport service enterprise in 2003.

Hembrey helped build the International Motor Sports Association IMSA LITES series into the North American launch program for the LMP3 2019 IMSA Prototype Challenge global platform.

Hembrey has helped develop the IMSA GT3 Cup Challenge.

Hembrey was the first general manager of the Trans-Am Series when SCCA restarted the series in 2009. The professional series raced at tracks beside other professional and amateur events.

== Professional Affiliations ==
- Director of Road Racing, United States Auto Club (2020–present)
- Race Director, GT World Challenge America (2020-2021)
- Series Manager, International Motor Sports Association Single Make and Challenge Series (2015–2020)
- Race Director, IMSA GT3 Cup Challenge (2012–2015)
- Race Director, Lamborghini Super Trofeo (2013–2015)
- Race Director, IMSA GT3 Cup Challenge Canada (2013–2015)
- Race Director, U.S. F2000 National Championship (2013–2014)
- Race Director, Pro Mazda Championship (2013–2014)
- Director of Competition, Traxxas TORC Series (2012–2013)
- Director of Competition, Trans-Am Series (2011–2012)
- General Manager / Race Director, SCCA Trans-Am Series (2009–2011)
- Director of Competition / Race Director, Formula Drift (2004–2010)
- Race Control, Formula 1 United States Grand Prix (2000–2007), Canadian Grand Prix (1995–1999)
- Assistant Chief Steward, Global MX-5 Cup (2006–2009)
- Race Operations, SPEED World Challenge (2000–2009)
