= Vietnam Museum of Revolution =

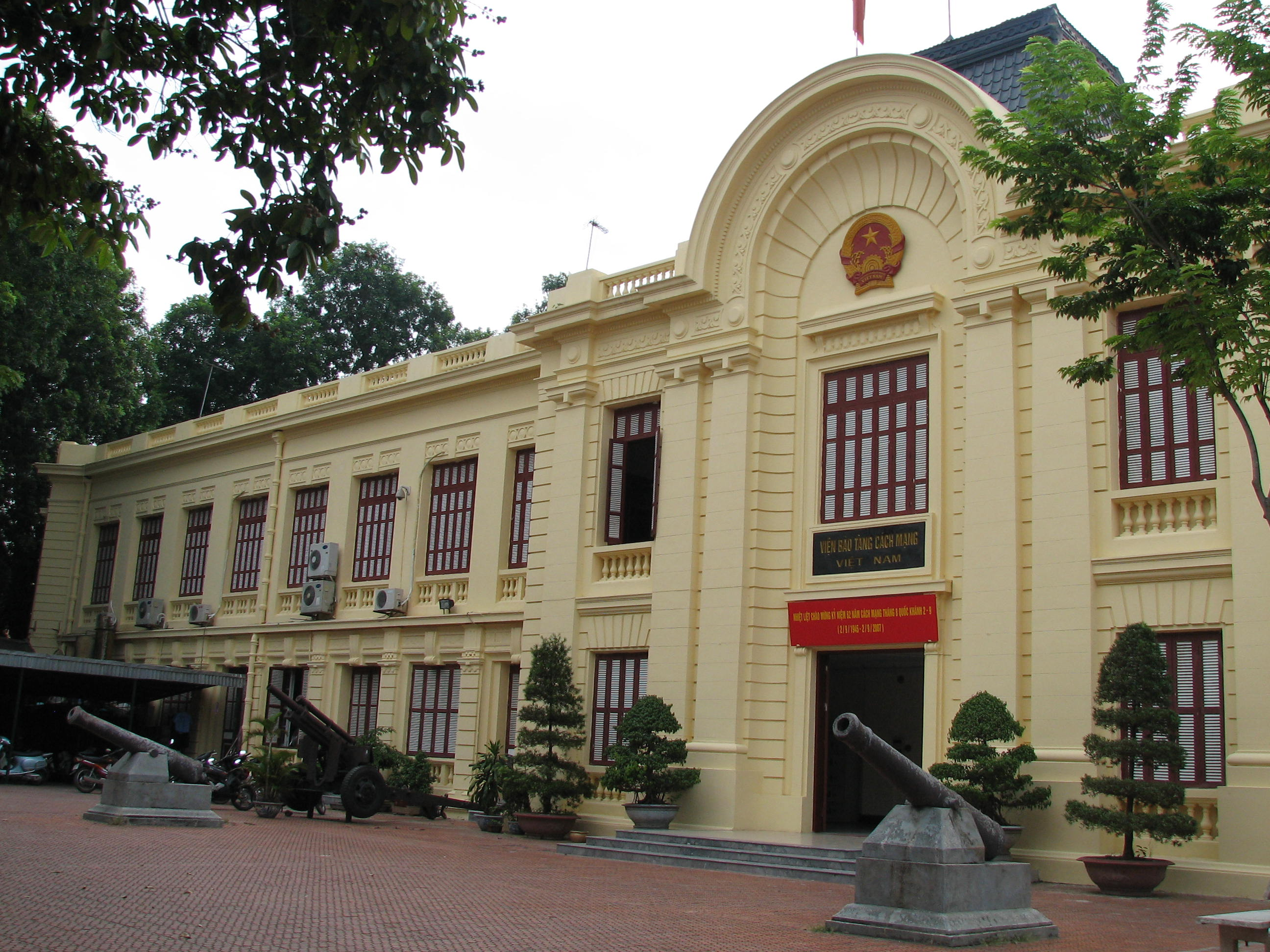

The Vietnam Museum of Revolution (Vietnamese: Viện Bảo tàng Cách mạng Việt Nam; chữ Hán: 院寶藏革命越南) was a museum in Hanoi, Vietnam. It is now part of the Vietnam National Museum of History.

Located in the Tong Dan area of the city, it was established in August 1959 in a two-story building, formerly used by the Trade Department of Vietnam. It was redesigned into 30 galleries, and as of 2008 contains in excess of 40,000 historical exhibits.
