= Roger Allen LaPorte =

Anti–Vietnam War activist

- Born: July 16, 1943
- Died: November 10, 1965 (aged 22); Bellevue Hospital, New York, U.S.
- Cause of death: Burns from self-immolation

Roger Allen LaPorte (July 16, 1943 – November 10, 1965) was an activist who set himself on fire in front of the United Nations building in New York City on November 9, 1965, to protest United States involvement in the Vietnam War. A former seminarian, he was a member of the Catholic Worker Movement at the time of his death.

== Early life ==
LaPorte was active in public speaking and debate clubs, for which he won awards. His parents divorced after he graduated from high school. Before joining the Catholic Workers, he had attended a seminary in Vermont and hoped to become a monk. However, he withdrew from the seminary early and attended and graduated from Holy Ghost Academy, Tupper Lake, New York, in 1961.

== Background of immolation ==
On June 11, 1963, Thích Quảng Đức, a Vietnamese Mahayana Buddhist monk burned himself to death at a busy Saigon road intersection. Thích Quảng Đức was protesting the persecution of Buddhists by South Vietnam's President Ngô Đình Diệm, a member of the Catholic minority. Photos of his self-immolation were circulated widely across the world and brought attention to the policies of the Diệm regime.

On March 16, 1965, 82-year-old pacifist Alice Herz immolated herself on a Detroit street corner in protest of the escalating Vietnam War. A man and his two boys were driving by and saw her burning and put out the flames. She died of her wounds ten days later. On November 2, 1965, Norman Morrison doused himself in kerosene and set himself on fire below Secretary of Defense Robert McNamara's Pentagon office.

== Self-immolation ==
The Morrison self-immolation at the Pentagon was front-page news as Catholic Workers gathered for an antiwar demonstration on Union Square in New York City on November 6, 1965, which LaPorte attended shortly after joining the Catholic Workers. Dorothy Day, the leader of the Catholic Workers, addressed the crowd. "I speak today as one who is old, and who must endorse the courage of the young who themselves are willing to give up their freedom," Day said. "This very struggle was begun by courage, even in martyrdom, which has been shared by the little children, in the struggle for full freedom and human dignity."

Catholic Worker Tom Cornell had become known in 1960 for burning his draft card at actions and had repeated the act several times, including for national television cameras during the 1962 Strike for Peace. In October 1965, another Catholic Worker, David Miller, became the first draft-card burner to be arrested under a new federal law banning the practice. Immediately following Day's speech on Union Square, Cornell and four others burned their draft cards on the platform. New York hecklers shouted, "Burn yourselves, not your cards."

Three days later, in front of the Dag Hammarskjold Library at the United Nations in New York, LaPorte composed himself in the position of the Buddhist monks of Vietnam, doused himself with gasoline, and set himself alight. He died the next day at Bellevue Hospital from second- and third-degree burns covering 95 percent of his body. Despite his burns, he remained conscious and able to speak. When asked why he had burned himself, LaPorte calmly replied, "I'm a Catholic Worker. I'm against war, all wars. I did this as a religious action." At the hospital, Catholic Workers sang "This Little Light of Mine."

Dorothy Day responded to the tragedy with an article in The Catholic Worker newspaper entitled, "Suicide or Sacrifice?" "It is not only that many youths and students throughout the country are deeply sensitive to the sufferings of the world," she wrote. "They have a keen sense that they must be responsible and make a profession of their faith that things do not have to go on as they always have—that men are capable of laying down their lives for others, taking a stand, even when the all-encroaching State and indeed all the world are against them."

John Leo wrote in the National Catholic Reporter that while the Catholic Workers had been important to the Church, they displayed "a sort of built-in rejection of complexity that I hope was not operative in LaPorte's death." The famous Trappist monk Thomas Merton also took issue with LaPorte's act and entered into a prolonged dispute with Day after laying blame for the incident at the feet of the Catholic Worker movement.

== See also ==
- Alice Herz
- George Winne, Jr.
- Norman Morrison
