= Allen Easter Ericson Weatherford =

Allen Easter Ericson Weatherford (1907–1965) was a professor of physical education and the first black man to earn a doctorate in the subject.

Allen Easter Ericson Weatherford was born on March 25, 1907, in Charlottesville, Virginia. Although an African American in the deep south at a time when blacks could be sent to jail for going to school beyond the ninth grade, his parents encouraged him to further his education. His uncle, Benjamin Tonsler, worked as a school principal, and was a driving force in helping Weatherford to take his education as far as he could. Weatherford left home to attend the Hampton institute in Hampton, Virginia, where he earned his bachelor's degree. Weatherford then went on to obtain his master's degree, and finally obtained his PhD degree in physical education; the first black man to do so. Weatherford moved to North Carolina, where he married Rebecca Christmas in 1939. They had six children together. Weatherford continued to work as a professor at St. Augustine's University; he also worked as Chairman of the Department of Physical Education there.

== See also ==
- List of African-American firsts
- Hampton University

== Sources ==
- "Brown v. the Board of Education of Shawnee County of Topeka, Kansas." ThinkQuest : Library. Oracle Think Quest
- "Hampton University : The Standard of Excellence." Hampton University : The Standard of Excellence.
- "Saint Augustine's University, 1315 Oakwood Avenue, Raleigh, North Carolina, United States
- "US Census Bureau." US Census Bureau.
- Weatherford, Thomas . "Thomas Weatherford of Charlottesville, VA:Information about Allen Easter Ericson Weatherford." Genealogy.com – Family Tree Maker Family History Software and Historical Records
