= Robert P. Braddicks =

American businessman

- Born: November 8, 1882; New York City
- Died: August 1965 (aged 82); New York City
- Occupation: Businessman
- Known for: Real-estate investor and vice president of Dunbar National Bank

Robert P. Braddicks (1882–1965) was a leading African American businessman in New York City in the first half of the 20th century.

== Biography ==
Robert Phillip Braddicks was born on November 8, 1882, in New York City.

In 1930, Braddicks became vice president of Dunbar National Bank in Harlem. The financial institution was founded and principally owned by John D. Rockefeller Jr. and was located within the Paul Laurence Dunbar Apartments at 2824 Eighth Avenue at 150th Street. At the time, it was the only bank in Harlem operated by African Americans. It was also one of the few banks at the time that would hire African Americans as tellers, clerks, and bookkeepers.

In August 1965, he died in his home in New York City after a brief illness.
