= Billiam van Roestenberg =

American political activist and organic farmer (born 1965)

Billiam van Roestenberg (born January 1, 1965) is an American political activist, former model, philanthropist, and organic farmer. Van Roestenberg was a member of the first same-sex couple to be married in New York State, one of many weddings conducted February 2004 in New Paltz, New York. He ran unsuccessfully for Ulster County Legislature in 2005 on the Democratic ticket. He is a community farm activist, maintaining one of the many organic apple orchards in New York State, which was nominated for the "Top Ten Apple Picking Farms in America".

== Liberty View Farm ==
Billiam van Roestenberg left New York City in 1999 to become an organic farmer. He purchased an orchard with 11 acres (45,000 m^{2}) of Cortland and Empire apples in Clintondale, New York.

Liberty View Farm is named for its view of the Shawangunk Ridge and for "liberty" from pesticides and conventional farming practices. The organically grown vegetables, herbs, edible flowers, bee hives, goats for milk and cheese and 100 chickens, are maintained by van Roestenberg, and a team of interns, apprentices, volunteers, and staff. The orchard is one of many "Certified Naturally Grown" farms throughout the Northeast, a designation many smaller farms consider a more transparent, less-expensive alternative to organic certification.

The farm's "Lease a Tree" program allows seasonal "ownership" of an apple tree and its produce. The "Charter a Chicken" program offers access to eggs and visitation with the renter's "pet". The farm works with local agencies, schools, and groups in order to provide internships and employment for people with various disabilities. Through the VESID program, disabled workers are given the opportunity to learn about agriculture, small business, marketing, and other aspects of farming. There are educational programs for local students to learn about sustainability, and there are classes addressing topics such as the honeybee crisis.

The farm has been used as a venue for benefits and to promote local art, events and businesses. Liberty View Farm provides apples to soup kitchens and schools, with 50 trees donated yearly to the hungry. His newsletter and blog, "Cultivating Community and Farmers" and "The Frugal Farmer", highlight events of agricultural and political import and encourage community involvement. The farm was named among "America's Top Ten Apple Picking Farms" by Travel & Leisure Magazine American Express in 2009. The apples grown at Liberty View Farm are certified naturally grown.

== Political activism ==
Van Roestenberg is a political and gay rights organizer, and is involved in organic "food activism." He sits on the Board of Eat Local Food, a group of farm market operators with the goal of bringing locally grown food to area residents. Van Roestenberg works with the food community of the Hudson Valley to increase awareness of issues and to make sustainable agriculture more accessible to more people. Some issues he is interested in include fighting hunger, living healthy, and promoting and preserving farmland.

Van Roestenberg was a member of the first same-sex couple married in New York State, in New Paltz, New York, in February 2004. The wedding ceremonies, marrying 21 same-sex couples, were conducted by Mayor Jason West. Although van Roestenberg had initially planned elaborate nuptials, the civil ceremonies were organized and carried out within days of the Mayor agreeing to participate. The event attracted the attention and scrutiny of the media, the gay community, the legal community, and local law enforcement.

In 2005 van Roestenberg organized Autogamy, an event which gave participants the opportunity to experience what it was like to plan his wedding.

Van Roestenberg served five years on the Zoning Board of Appeals, over two years on the zoning commission, and served as Vice Chair of the town Democratic Commission. Van Roestenberg made an unsuccessful bid for County Legislature on the Democratic ticket in 2005.

In 2010, van Roestenberg organized the "Unhappy Anniversary" to commemorate the sixth anniversary of the New Paltz same-sex weddings. Conducted at the original site by the Village Hall, gay activists sought to bring attention to the continued lack of marriage equality in New York State and in the U.S.

== Awards ==
Van Roestenberg was nominated for the Heart of Green Local Hero Award by the Daily Green in 2010, losing to Fred Schaeffer, who led the transformation of a decaying railroad bridge spanning the Hudson River into New York's newest state park, Walkway Over the Hudson. He was a presenter at the Global Food Crisis Conference at State University of New York at New Paltz in February 2010.
