= Tu Bông =

Tu Bông Xã Tu Bông
- Commune
- Location in Vietnam
- Coordinates: 12°46′18″N 109°17′53″E
- Country: Vietnam
- Province: Khánh Hòa Province
- Time zone: UTC+7 (UTC+7)

Tu Bông is a commune (xã) in Khánh Hòa Province, in Southeast Vietnam.
