= Kostas Georgakis =

Greek activist (1948–1970)

- Born: 23 August 1948
- Died: 19 September 1970 (aged 22); Genoa, Italy
- Cause of death: Suicide by self-immolation

Kostas Georgakis (Greek: Κώστας Γεωργάκης; 23 August 1948 – 19 September 1970) was a Greek student studying geology in Italy. On 26 July 1970, while in Italy, he gave an interview denouncing the dictatorial regime of Georgios Papadopoulos. The junta retaliated by attacking him, pressuring his family, and rescinding his military exemption. In a final, fatal, protest in the early hours of 19 September 1970, Georgakis set himself ablaze in Matteotti square in Genoa. He died later that day, and his funeral on 22 September was attended by an estimated 1,500 people, including Greek actress Melina Mercouri. After being briefly interred in Genoa, his remains were transported by ship to Corfu, and on 18 January 1971 he was buried. After the junta collapsed, the Government of Greece erected a monument and plaque in his home town of Corfu, another plaque was placed in Matteotti Square, and multiple poems have been written in his honor.

== Early life ==
Georgakis grew up in Corfu in a family of five. His father was a self-employed tailor of modest means. Both his father and grandfather distinguished themselves in the major wars that Greece fought in the 20th century. He attended the second lyceum in Corfu where he excelled in his studies. In August 1967, a few months after the 21 April coup in Greece, Georgakis went to Italy to study as a geologist in Genoa. He received 5,000 drachmas per month from his father and this, according to friends' testimony, made him feel guilty for the financial burden his family endured so that he could attend a university. In Italy he met Rosanna, an Italian girl of the same age and they got engaged. In 1968, Georgakis became a member of the Center Union party of Georgios Papandreou.

== Protest ==
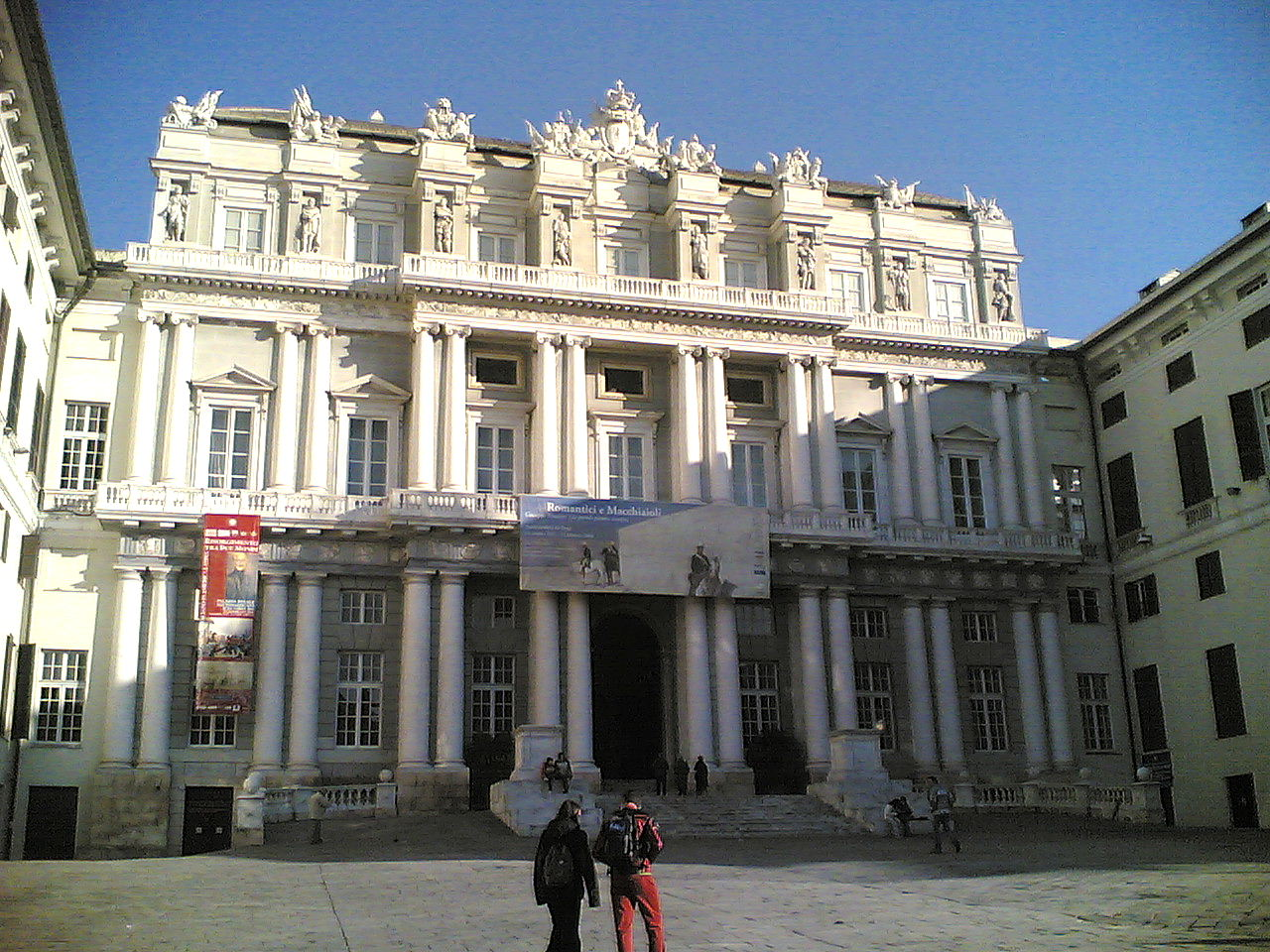
The Palace of the Doges view from Piazza Matteotti; the place where Georgakis committed suicide.

On 26 July 1970, Georgakis gave an anonymous interview to a Genovese magazine, during which he revealed that the military junta's intelligence service had infiltrated the Greek student movement in Italy. In the interview he denounced the junta and its policies and stated that the intelligence service created the National League of Greek Students in Italy and established offices in major university cities. A copy of the recording of the interview was obtained by the Greek consulate and the identity of Georgakis was established.

Soon after, he was attacked by members of the junta student movement. While in the third year of his studies and having passed the exams of the second semester Georgakis found himself in the difficult position of having his military exemption rescinded by the junta as well as his monthly stipend that he received from his family. The junta retaliated for his involvement in the anti-junta resistance movement in Italy as a member of the Italian branch of PAK. His family in Corfu also sent him a letter describing the pressure that the regime was applying to them.

Fearing for his family in Greece, Georgakis decided that he had to make an act to raise awareness in the West about the political predicament of Greece. Once he made the decision to sacrifice his life, Georgakis filled a canister with gasoline, wrote a letter to his father and gave his fiancée Rosanna his windbreaker telling her to keep it because he would not need it any longer.

Around 1:00 a.m. on 19 September 1970, Georgakis drove his Fiat 500 to Matteotti Square. According to eyewitness accounts by street cleaners working around the Palazzo Ducale there was a sudden bright flash of light in the area at around 3:00 a.m. At first they did not realise that the flame was a burning man. Only when they approached closer did they see Georgakis burning and running while ablaze shouting, "Long live Greece", "Down with the tyrants", "Down with the fascist colonels" and "I did it for my Greece." The street cleaners added that Georgakis initially refused their help and ran away when they tried to extinguish the fire. They also said that the smell of burning flesh was something they would never forget and that Georgakis was one in a million.

According to an account by his father who went to Italy after the events, Georgakis's body was completely carbonised from the waist down up to a depth of at least three centimetres in his flesh. Georgakis died nine hours after the events in the square at around 12 noon the same day. His last words were "long live Free Greece".

== Reaction of the junta ==
Monument of Kostas Georgakis in Corfu. The inscription reads in Greek: Kostas Georgakis, Student, Kerkyra 1948 – 1970 Genoa. He immolated himself in Genoa, Italy on 19 September 1970 for Freedom and Democracy in Greece. In the lower part his words are inscribed: I cannot but think and act as a free individual.

The Greek newspaper To Vima in the January 2009 article "The 'return' of Kostas Georgakis" with the subtitle "Even the remains of the student who sacrificed himself for Democracy caused panic to the dictatorship" by Fotini Tomai, supervisor of the historical and diplomatic archives of the Greek Ministry of Foreign Affairs. The article reports that throughout the crisis in Italy the Greek consulate sent confidential reports to the junta where it raised fears that the death of Georgakis would be compared to the death of Jan Palach (through express diplomatic letter of 20 September 1970 Greek: ΑΠ 67, εξ. επείγον, 20 Σεπτεμβρίου 1970) and could adversely affect Greek tourism while at the same time it raised concerns that Georgakis's grave would be used for anti-junta propaganda and "anti-nation pilgrimage" and "political exploitation".

Through a diplomatic letter dated 25 August 1972 (ΑΠ 167/ΑΣ 1727, 25 Αυγούστου 1972), Greek consular authorities in Italy reported to the junta in Athens that an upcoming Italian film about Georgakis would seriously damage the junta and it was proposed that the junta take measures through silent third-party intervention to obtain the worldwide distribution rights of the film so that it would not fall into the hands of German, Scandinavian, American stations and the BBC which were reported as interested in obtaining it. The film was scheduled to appear at the "Primo Italiano" festival in Turin, at the festival of Pesaro and the Venice anti-festival under the title "Galani Hora" ("Blue Country"; in Italian, "Uno dei tre"). Gianni Serra was the director and the film was a coproduction by RAI and CTC at a total cost of 80 million Italian lire. The dictatorship was also afraid that the film would create the same anti-junta sentiment as the film Z by Costa-Gavras.

The minister of Foreign Affairs of the junta, Xanthopoulos-Palamas, in the secret encrypted message ΑΠ ΓΤΛ 400-183 of 26 November 1970 (ΑΠ ΓΤΛ 400-183 απόρρητον κρυπτοτύπημα, 26 Νοεμβρίου 1970) suggests to the Greek consular authorities in Italy to take precautions so that during the loading of the remains on the ship to avoid any noise and publicity. It was clear that the junta did not want a repeat of the publicity that occurred during Georgakis's funeral procession on 22 September 1970 in Italy.

On 22 September 1970, Melina Merkouri led a demonstration of hundreds of flag and banner-waving Italian and Greek anti-junta resistance members during the funeral procession of Georgakis in Italy. Merkouri was holding a bouquet of flowers for the dead student. According to press reports, Greek secret service agents were sent from Greece for the occasion. The number of people at the funeral was estimated at 1500. In another diplomatic letter, it is mentioned that Stathis Panagoulis, brother of Alexandros Panagoulis, was scheduled to give the funeral address but did not attend.

According to diplomatic message ΑΠ 432, dated 23 September 1970 (ΑΠ 432, 23 Σεπτεμβρίου 1970), from the Greek Embassy in Rome, then-ambassador A. Poumpouras informed the junta that hundreds of workers and anti-junta resistance members accompanied Georgakis's body from the hospital to the mausoleum in Genoa where he was temporarily interred. In the afternoon of the same day a demonstration of about a thousand was held which was organised by leftist parties shouting "anti-Hellenic" and anti-American slogans according to the ambassador. In the press conference which followed the demonstrations Melina Merkouri was scheduled to talk but instead Ioannis Leloudas from Paris and Chistos Stremmenos attended, the latter bearing a message from Andreas Papandreou. According to the ambassador's message Italian police took security precautions around the Greek consulate at the time, at the request of the Greek Embassy in Rome.

Another consular letter by consul N. Fotilas (ΑΠ 2 14 January 1971, ΑΠ 2, 14 Ιανουαρίου 1971) mentioned that on 13 January 1971 the remains of Georgakis were transferred to the ship Astypalaia owned by Vernikos-Eugenides under the Greek flag. The ship was scheduled to leave for Piraeus on 17 January carrying the remains of Georgakis to Greece. With this a series of obstacles, mishaps, adventures and misadventures involving the return of the remains came to an end.

On 18 January 1971, a secret operation was undertaken by the junta to finally bury Georgakis's remains in the municipal cemetery of Corfu city. A single police cruiser accompanied the Georgakis family, who were transported to the cemetery by taxi.

== Letters written ==
=== Letter to his father ===
Georgakis wrote a final letter to his father. Newspaper publisher, and owner of Kathimerini, Helen Vlachos, in one of her books, mentions this letter as well.

My dear father. Forgive me for this act, without crying. Your son is not a hero. He is a human, like all the others, maybe a little more fearful. Kiss our land for me. After three years of violence I cannot suffer any longer. I don't want you to put yourselves in any danger because of my own actions. But I cannot do otherwise but think and act as a free individual. I write to you in Italian so that I can raise the interest of everyone for our problem. Long Live Democracy. Down with the tyrants. Our land which gave birth to Freedom will annihilate tyranny! If you are able to, forgive me. Your Kostas.

=== Letter to a friend ===
In a letter to a friend Georgakis mentions:

I am sure that sooner or later the people of Europe will understand that a fascist regime like the one based on Greek tanks is not only an insult to their dignity as free men but also a constant threat to Europe. ... I do not want my action to be considered heroic as it is nothing more than a situation of no choice. On the other hand, maybe some people will awaken to see what times we live in.

== Recognition ==
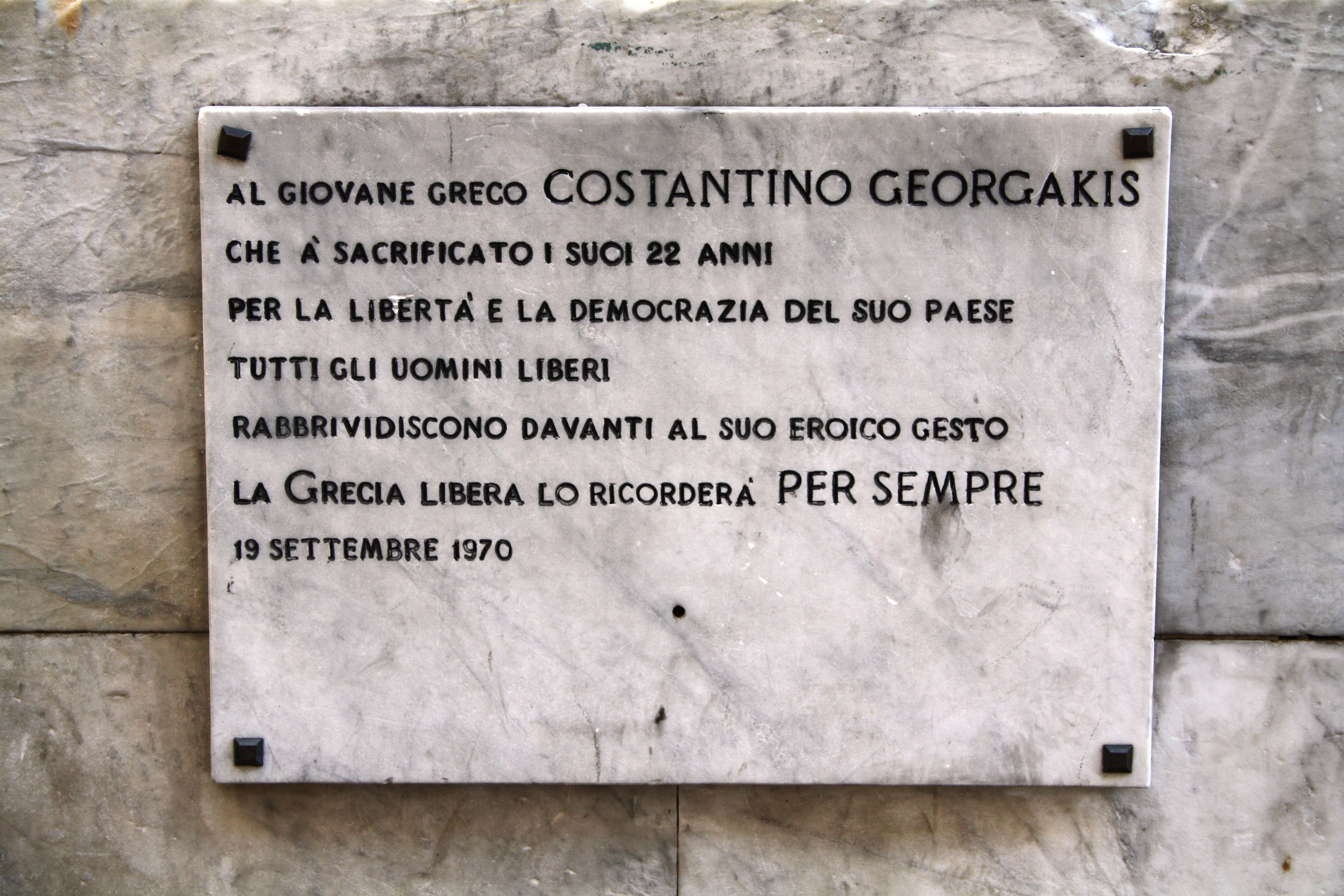
Plaque in memoriam of Kostas Georgakis in Matteotti Square, Genoa

The Municipality of Corfu has dedicated a memorial in his honour near his home in Corfu city. His sacrifice was later recognized and honoured by the new democratic Hellenic Government after metapolitefsi.

In his monument a plaque is inscribed with his words in Greek. The monument was created gratis by sculptor Dimitris Korres.

Poet Nikiforos Vrettakos in his poem "I Thea tou Kosmou" (The View of the World) wrote for Georgakis:

...you were the bright summary of our drama...in one and the same torch, the light of the resurrection and our mourning by the gravestone...

Poet Yannis Koutsoheras wrote:

Original

ζωντανός σταυρός φλεγόμενος
και κραυγή urbi et orbi
υπερκόσμια:
– Λευτεριά στην Ελλάδα.

Κώστας Γεωργάκης –
αυτοπυρπολούμενος
στην πλατεία της Τζένοβα

Translation:
Translation

Living cross burning
and a cry urbi et orbi
otherworldly:
– Freedom to Greece.

Kostas Georgakis –
immolated himself
in Genoa square

On 18 September 2000 in a special all-night event at Matteotti square, Genoa honoured the memory of Georgakis.

In Matteotti square where he died, a plaque stands with the inscription in Italian: La Grecia Libera lo ricorderà per sempre (Free Greece will remember him forever). The complete inscription on the plaque reads:

Al Giovane Greco Constantino Georgakis che à sacrificato i suoi 22 anni per la Libertà e la Democrazia del suo paese. Tutti gli Uomini Liberi rabbrividiscono davanti al suo Eroico Gesto. La Grecia Libera lo ricorderà per sempre

which translates in English:

To the young Greek Konstantin Georgakis who sacrificed his 22 years for the Freedom and Democracy of his country. All Free Men shudder before his heroic gesture. Free Greece will remember him forever

== Legacy ==
I cannot but think and act as a free individual

— Kostas Georgakis

Georgakis is the only known junta opponent to have killed himself in protest against the junta and he is considered the precursor of the later student protests, such as the Polytechnic uprising. At the time, his death caused a sensation in Greece and abroad as it was the first tangible manifestation of the depth of resistance against the junta. The junta delayed the arrival of his remains to Corfu for four months citing security reasons and fearing demonstrations while presenting bureaucratic obstacles through the Greek consulate and the junta government.

Kostas Georgakis is cited as an example indicating the strong relation between an individual's identity and his/her reasons to continue living. Georgakis' words were cited as an indication that his strong identification as a free individual gave him the reason to end his life.

== Film ==
- Once Upon A Time There Were Heroes, Direction: Andreas Apostolidis, Screenplay: Stelios Kouloglou, Cinematography: Vangelis Koulinos, Created by: Stelios Kouloglou, Production: Lexicon & Partners, BetacamSp Colour 58 minutes.
- Reportage without frontiers: documentary Title: "The Georgakis Case" Director: Kostas Kouloglou
- Uno dei tre (1973) Film by Gianni Serra

== Books ==
- C. Paputsis, Il grande sì, Il caso Kostas Georgakis, Genova, Erga Edizioni, 2000. ISBN 978-8881632176.

== See also ==
- Liviu Cornel Babeș
- Alain Escoffier
- Oleksa Hirnyk
- Romas Kalanta
- List of political self-immolations
- Evžen Plocek
- Ryszard Siwiec
- Thích Quảng Đức
- Jan Zajíc
