= Liviu Cornel Babeș =

Romanian artist (1942–1989)

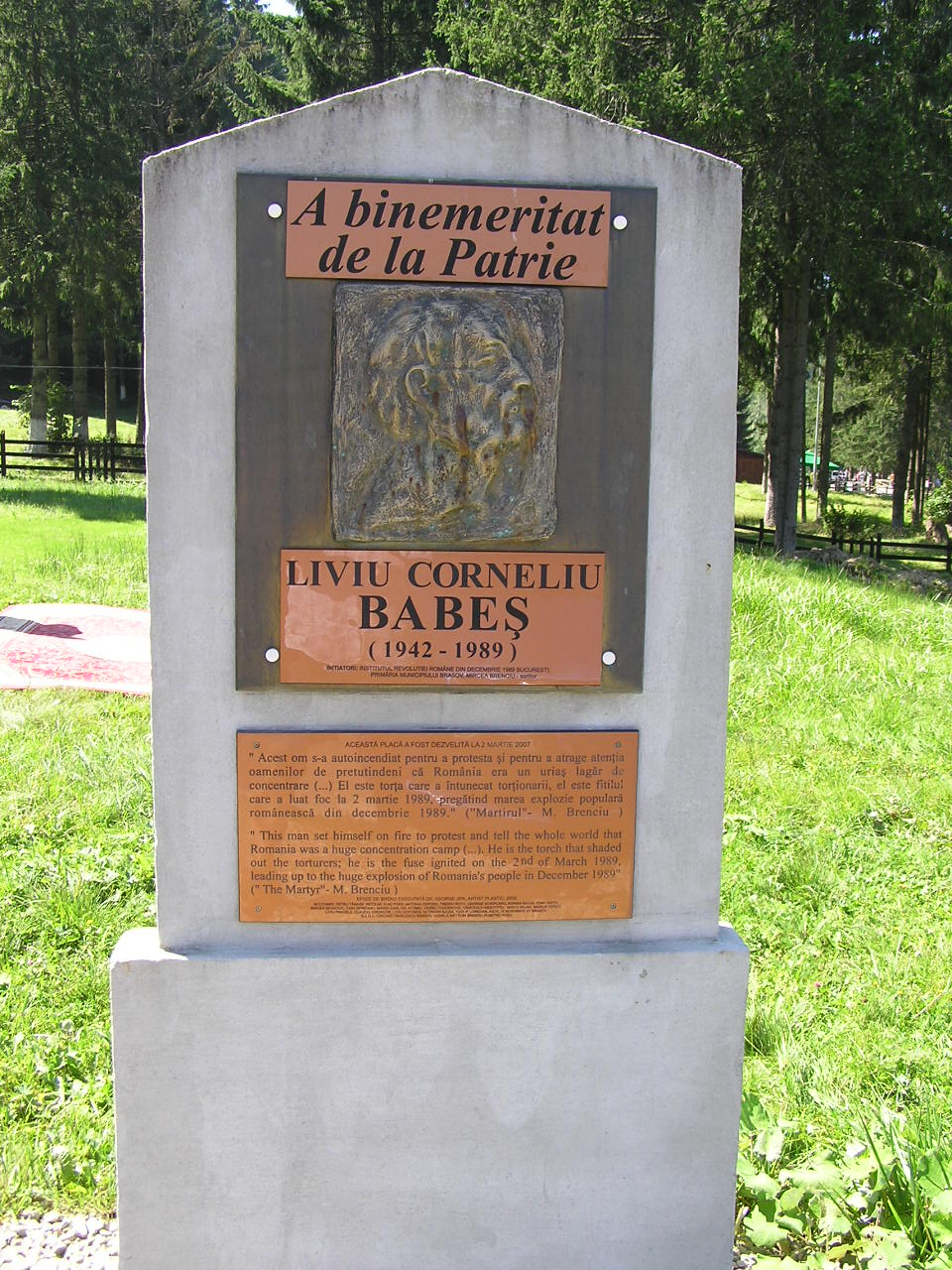
Monument to Liviu Cornel Babeș at Poiana Brașov

Liviu Cornel Babeș (10 September 1942 – 2 March 1989) was a Romanian hero. He was an electrician and painter who was born in Brașov and committed suicide by self-immolation as a political protest.

== Death ==
On 2 March 1989 Babeș set himself on fire on the Bradu ski slope at Poiana Brașov as a sign of protest against the communist regime. He left the message: „Stop Murder! Brașov = Auschwitz". He was taken to the Brașov county hospital, where he died two hours later.

In Romania, according to Law no. 93, on 3 June 2007, Liviu Cornel Babeș was declared a hero.

== Place names ==
- A street in Brașov has been named after him.

== See also ==
- Brașov Rebellion
- Jan Palach
- Jan Zajíc
- Ryszard Siwiec
- Romas Kalanta
- Oleksa Hirnyk
- Alain Escoffier
- Călin Alexandru Nemeș
- Kostas Georgakis
- List of political self-immolations
