= Oleksa Hirnyk =

Ukrainian nationalist (1912–1978)

Hero of Ukraine Oleksa Hirnyk
- Олекса Гiрник
- Born: 28 March 1912; Bohorodchany, Austria-Hungary
- Died: 21 January 1978 (aged 65); Kaniv, Ukrainian SSR, Soviet Union
- Cause of death: Self-immolation
- Awards: Hero of Ukraine

Oleksa Mykolayovych Hirnyk (Ukrainian: Олекса Миколайович Гiрник; 28 March 1912 – 21 January 1978) was a Ukrainian nationalist and Soviet dissident, an engineer by profession, who burned himself to death as an act of protest against Soviet suppression of the Ukrainian language (russification), culture and history. The act was quickly covered up by the Soviet authorities and remained unknown to general populace for decades.

== Early life ==
Hirnyk was born on 28 March 1912 in the town of Bohorodchany, then Austrian-ruled Galicia, currently in Ivano-Frankivsk Oblast (province) in western Ukraine. He came from a family of Boykos with a long background of preserving Ukrainian culture and heritage, his grandfather was the founder of the Prosvita Society in Bohorodchany, a society that promoted Ukrainian culture and the Ukrainian language.

After finishing secondary education, his parents wanted him to study at the seminary to become a priest. He, however, enrolled into a paramilitary organization "Sokil". When he was getting ready to study philosophy at the University of Lviv, he was conscripted into the Polish army. While serving, he protested the treatment of Ukrainian soldiers by the Polish officers.

== Activism ==
Hirnyk was a member of Prosvita, Plast and OUN.

In 1937, because of statements against the Polish government and speaking about the independence of Ukraine, he was sentenced to five years in prison. When the Soviets took control of Ukraine in 1939, Hirnyk escaped from prison in Lviv. In that same year he persisted with his promotion of the Ukrainian language and of Ukrainian culture, and he did not hide his aspirations for independent Ukrainian statehood. He was arrested and sentenced to 8 years, which he spent in a penal colony in the Ural region. After he was released in 1948 he returned to Ukraine, married Carolyna Petrash and worked in different jobs.

Hirnyk became conscious of the dire state of the Ukrainian language in the country and witnessed that, due to the Soviet policies of Russification, Ukrainian language was no longer spoken, particularly in the eastern and central regions. In his house he began to produce handwritten leaflets (accompanied with quotes of Taras Shevchenko) — overall 1000 copies in 8 different versions.

== Self-immolation ==
Taras (Chernecha) Hill, the site of Hirnyk's self-immolation, in winter

The night of 21 January 1978, the eve of the sixtieth anniversary of Ukraine's declaration of independence by the Tsentralna Rada government, Hirnyk doused himself with four liters of gasoline and burned himself to death on Chernecha Hill, in Kaniv not far from Taras Shevchenko’s tomb. He had written close to a thousand leaflets containing quotes of Taras Shevchenko, protests against the russification of Ukraine, and calls for Ukrainian independence, and left them scattered on the hill. The KGB and local police quickly collected about 950 of them, however a few were hidden by the locals and even by some policemen. The man who discovered the body was arrested and coerced into silence. Hirnyk's wife was initially told that her husband died in a car accident and she was later forced to sign a written statement pledging not to tell anyone about the particulars of her husband's death. Hirnyk's son was 23 years old at the time of his father's death.

== Commemoration ==
A memorial plaque at a school in Ivano-Frankivsk where Hirnyk studied

Unlike the Czech student Jan Palach, who also burned himself to death in protest of Soviet occupation of Czechoslovakia, Hirnyk's sacrifice was not well known. However, for years on the anniversary of his death, unknown people were putting on the place of his death a cluster of red guelder-rose fruits as a tribute. After Ukraine's independence, Hirnyk's story began to emerge from the archives and testimonies of the witnesses. In 1993 a street was named after him in Kalush, and a memorial plaque was put on his house. In 1999 the Hirnyk charitable fund was set up dedicated to the promotion of children's literature in Ukrainian. In 2000 a guelder-rose bush was planted on the place of his death. By decree of the President of Ukraine of 18 January 2007, Oleksa Hirnyk was awarded the title of the Hero of Ukraine posthumously and awarded the Order of the State.

As part of the derussification campaign that swept through Ukraine following the February 2022 Russian invasion of Ukraine, the Suzdal (Note: Suzdal is a city in Russia.) Street in (Ukraine's capital) Kyiv was renamed Oleksa Hirnyk Street on 23 March 2023.

== See also ==
- List of political self-immolations
- Vasyl Makukh
- Jan Palach
- Jan Zajíc
- Ryszard Siwiec
- Romas Kalanta
- Liviu Babeș
- Albert Razin
