= Piotr Szczęsny =

Polish chemist who committed suicide by immolation in protest against the government

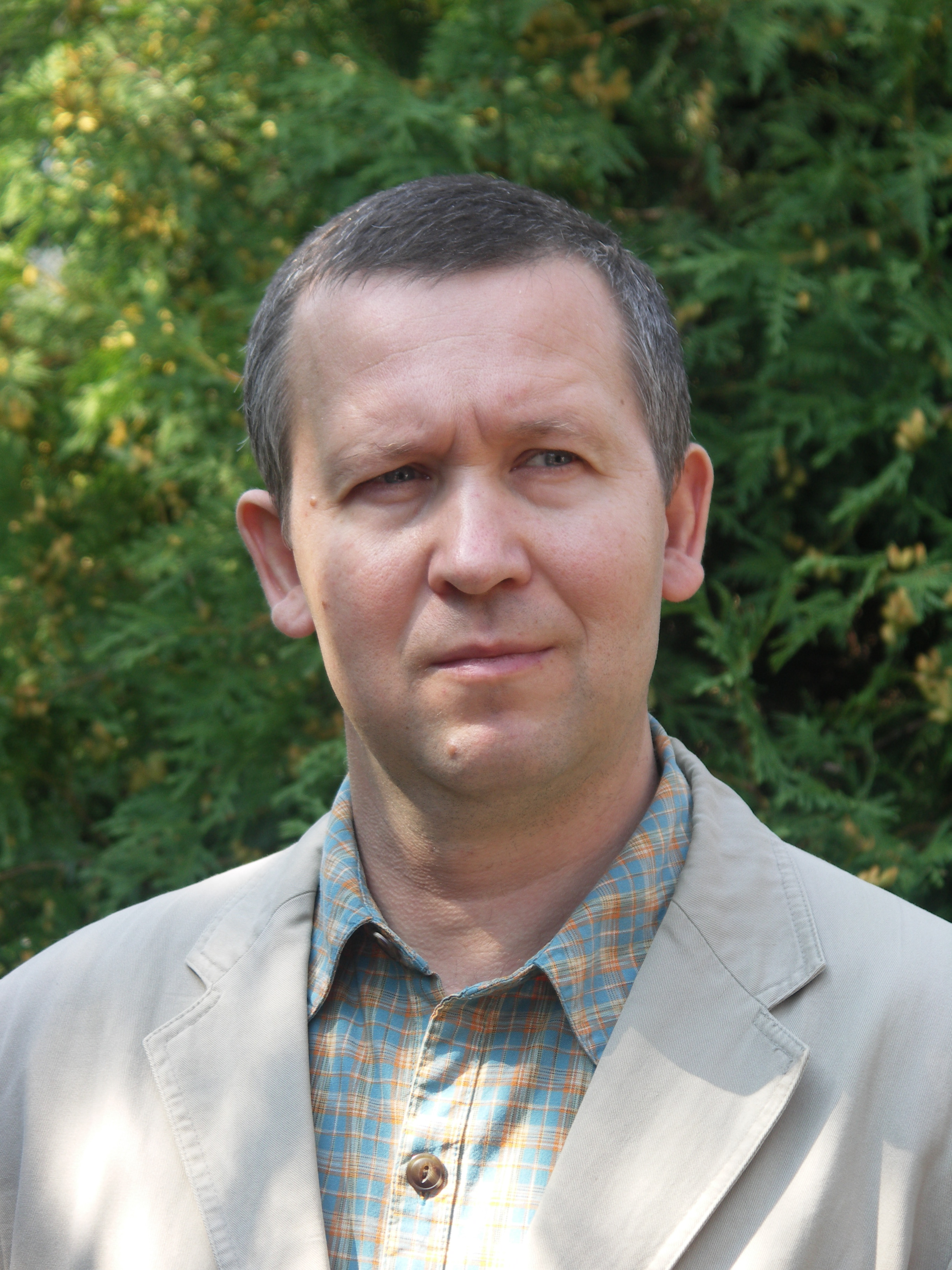
- Born: 6 July 1963; Kraków, Poland
- Died: 29 October 2017 (aged 54); Warsaw, Poland
- Cause of death: Suicide by self-immolation
- Resting place: Salwator Cemetery
- Occupation: Chemist
- Known for: Self immolation in front of the Palace of Culture and Science

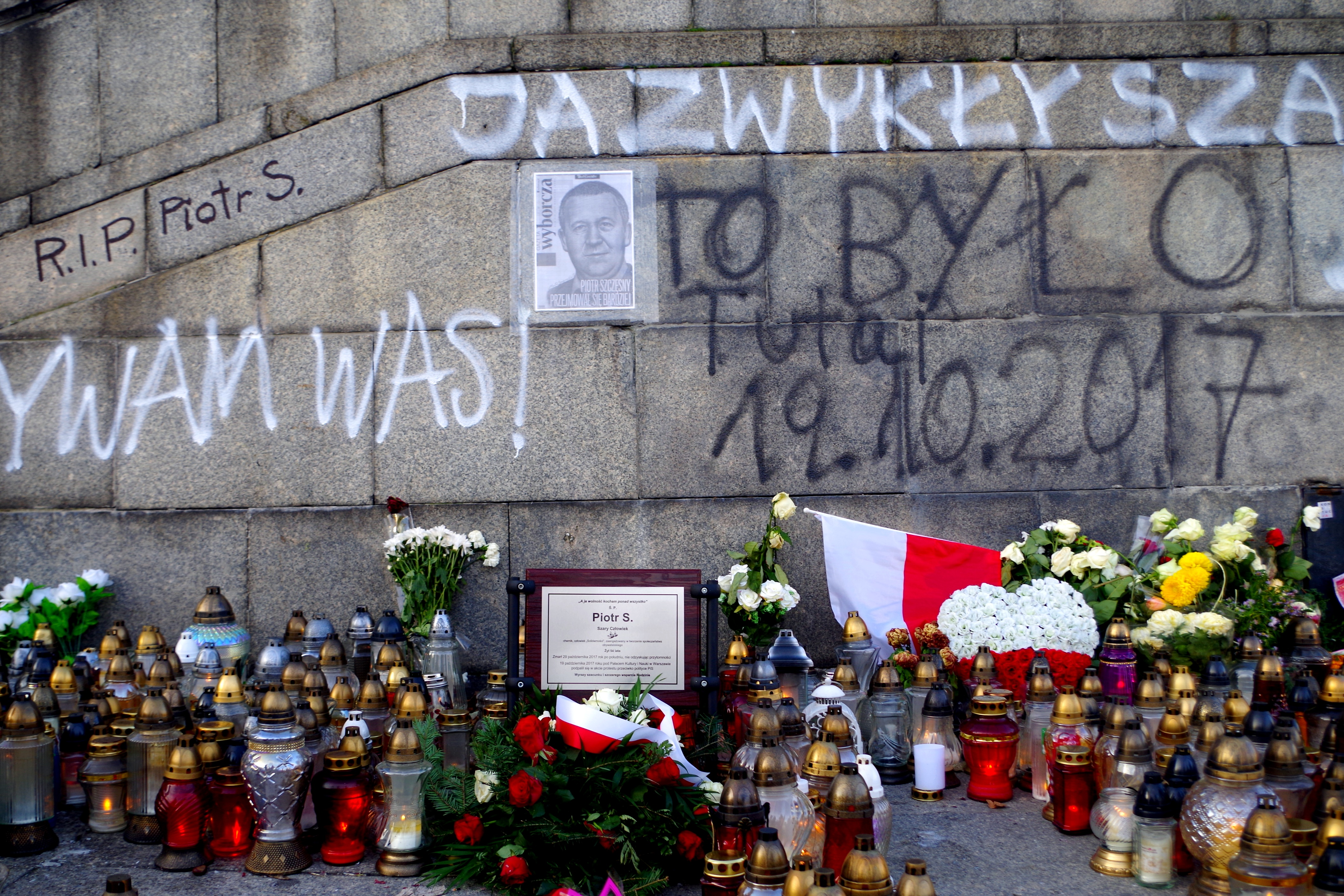
The place in Warsaw where Piotr Szczęsny set himself on fire

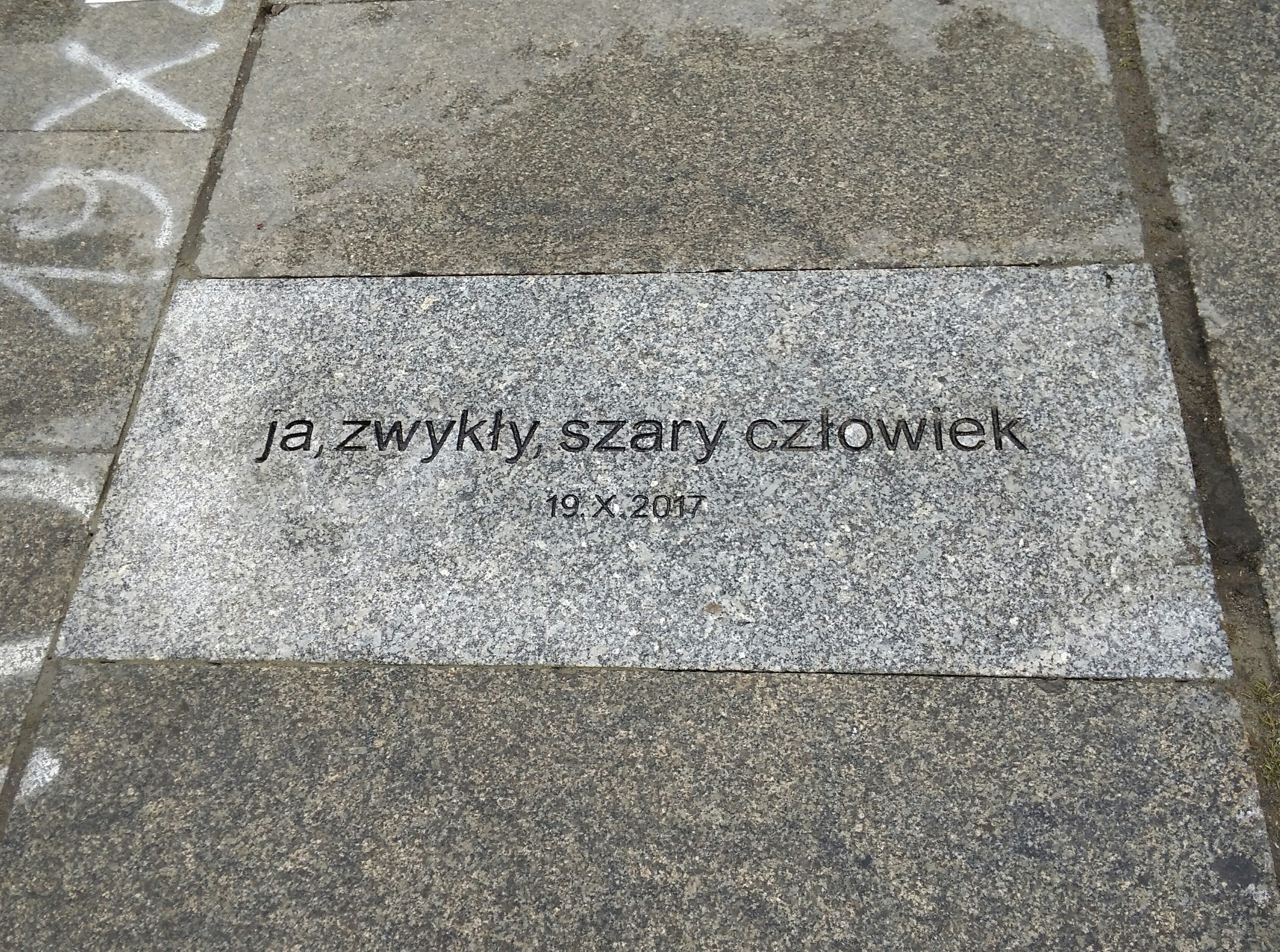
Memorial plaque next to the official gallery of the Palace of Culture: "I, an ordinary, grey person"

Piotr Paweł Szczęsny (6 July 1963, Kraków – 29 October 2017, Warsaw) was a Polish chemist and a Mensa member who committed suicide by immolation in protest against the policies of the ruling Law and Justice government.

== Education and career ==
He studied chemistry at Jagiellonian University and became a member of the Independent Students' Union. He worked in the 1980s in the "Solidarność" union federation. After graduation, he remained as an assistant at the university, and began his doctoral thesis. After 1989, he left the university and became co-founder of a publishing house, which edited manuals on chemistry. For ten years, he held the post of Chairman of a Society for Continuing Vocational Training. He worked as a consultant on business issues. In 2016 he closed his company.

== Self-immolation ==
He burned himself as a sign of political protest. On 19 October 2017, he entered the Parade Square in front of the Palace of Culture and Science, played the song Kocham wolność, distributed copies of a self-produced leaflet, poured flammable liquid over himself and set himself on fire. He died in the hospital ten days later. Following Szczęsny's death, the government media declared him mentally unstable. Piotr Szczęsny was buried on 14 November 2017 at the Kraków Salwator Cemetery in the presence of thousands of mourners from all over Poland.

Szczęsny lived in Niepołomice; his wife is a pharmacist and their two children were studying for their doctorates. He was not involved in any political action of the Polish opposition and had suffered from depression for the last eight years of his life. In a letter to his family, he stated that his deed was not motivated by his condition. Szczęsny's suicide received considerable publicity and a march held to honour him was attended by several hundred people.

== See also ==
- Ryszard Siwiec
- Romas Kalanta
- List of political self-immolations
