= Anumarana =

Indian practice of self-immolation

Anumarana or Anugamana refers to the ancient Indian practice of self-immolation by which anyone with personal loyalty to the deceased could commit suicide at a loved one's funeral. Anumarana was practiced usually by the widowed wives, when learnt of husband's death at battlefield or elsewhere and he had been already cremated. The widow then resolves to take away her life and immolated herself with husband's ashes or padukas or other such memento. The practice of Anumarana is mentioned in Kamasutra. In Mahabharata, there is a mention of Anumarana being practiced by widows of Kshatriyas on rare occasions. The practice has been described to be prevalent northern India and had existed before the Gupta Empire. As per custom, the Brahmin women were only permitted to die by Sahamarana and were not allowed the right of anumarana; however, non-Brahmin women could decide to self-immolate both by sahamarana or anumarana. Anumarana was not comparable to later understandings of the practice of sati, as in this widows did not self-immolate in funeral pyre of her husband. When a widow immolated herself with the husband's dead body, it was called Sahamarana or Sahagamana.

The Commission of Sati (Prevention) Act, 1987 Part I, Section 2(c) defines Sati as the act or rite itself, including both sahamarana and anumarana. The practice of anumarana was generally banned by British authorities already in 1826 (with a prior ban for Brahmin widows in 1817), three years prior to the general ban on sati. At least 3 cases of anumarana were recorded in 1826. Nor had such cases been particularly exceptional; Anand Yang documents several cases where the widow immolated herself many years after her husband's death. Just in the Ghazipur district in 1822, for example, 4 widows were reported to commit anumarana 16–40 years after the deaths of their husbands, one of them throwing herself on the funeral pyre of her son.

Also the practice of anumarana was, in earlier times, not restricted to widows. These included the deceased's relatives, servants, followers, or friends. Sometimes these deaths stemmed from vows of loyalty, and is said to have been prevalent in the 11th century CE in north/northwestern India, cases recorded in the 13th century CE as well. At the death in 1839 of the founder of the Sikh Empire, Ranjit Singh, Ranjit Singh's premier minister, Dhyan Singh, declared his commitment to perish in the flames as well. He had to be physically prevented from doing so by the other courtiers, since they felt the Sikh Empire could not manage without Dhyan Singh at this point of crisis in history.

== See also ==
- Jauhar
- Sati (practice), a chiefly historical practice in which a Hindu widow burns alive on her deceased husband's funeral pyre
