= 1834 Palach =

Stony main-belt asteroid

Discovery
- Discovered by: L. Kohoutek
- Discovery site: Bergedorf Obs.
- Discovery date: 22 August 1969

Designations
- Named after: Jan Palach (Czech student)
- Alternative designations: 1969 QP
- Minor planet category: main-belt · · (outer); Eos

Orbital characteristics
- Epoch 4 September 2017 (JD 2458000.5)
- Uncertainty parameter 0
- Observation arc: 47.26 yr (17,260 days)
- Aphelion: 3.2373 AU
- Perihelion: 2.8142 AU
- Semi-major axis: 3.0258 AU
- Eccentricity: 0.0699
- Orbital period (sidereal): 5.26 yr (1,922 days)
- Mean anomaly: 102.36°
- Mean motion: 0° 11^{m} 14.28^{s} / day
- Inclination: 9.4352°
- Longitude of ascending node: 268.16°
- Argument of perihelion: 358.39°

Physical characteristics
- Dimensions: 17.156±0.414; 18.059±0.264 km 19.52 km (calculated); 20.23±0.87 km
- Synodic rotation period: 3.1358±0.0009 h 3.139±0.001 h
- Geometric albedo: 0.109±0.010; 0.1364±0.0190; 0.14 (assumed); 0.151±0.020
- Spectral type: S (assumed)
- Absolute magnitude (H): 11.3 · 11.50 · 11.54±0.20

1834 Palach, provisional designation 1969 QP, is a stony Eoan asteroid from the outer region of the asteroid belt, approximately 19 kilometers in diameter. It was discovered on 22 August 1969 by Czech astronomer Luboš Kohoutek at Bergedorf Observatory in Hamburg, Germany, and named after Czech student Jan Palach.

== Orbit and classification ==
Palach is a member of the Eos family (606), the largest asteroid family in the outer main belt consisting of nearly 10,000 asteroids.

It orbits the Sun in the outer main-belt at a distance of 2.8–3.2 AU once every 5 years and 3 months (1,922 days). Its orbit has an eccentricity of 0.07 and an inclination of 9° with respect to the ecliptic. As no precoveries were taken, and no prior identifications were made, Palach's observation arc begins with its official discovery observation in 1969.

== Physical characteristics ==
=== Rotation period ===
In September 2006, a rotational lightcurve for Palach was obtained from photometric observations made by French amateur astronomer Laurent Bernasconi at St. Michel sur Meu. It gave a rotation period of 3.139 hours with a brightness amplitude of 0.16 magnitude (U=2). In May 2010, a second lightcurve, obtained by Zachary Pligge at Oakley Southern Sky Observatory, Australia, gave a period of 3.1358 hours with an amplitude of 0.13 (U=2).

=== Diameter and albedo ===
According to the surveys carried out by the Japanese Akari satellite and NASA's Wide-field Infrared Survey Explorer with its subsequent NEOWISE mission, Palach measures between 17.16 and 20.23 kilometers in diameter, and its surface has an albedo between 0.109 and 0.151. The Collaborative Asteroid Lightcurve Link assumes a standard albedo for Eoan asteroids of 0.14 and calculates a diameter of 19.52 kilometers with an absolute magnitude of 11.3.

== Naming ==
It was named in memory of Czech student Jan Palach (1948–1969), who burned himself to death, as a protest against the Soviet occupation of Czechoslovakia that followed and ended the national reform movement known as the Prague Spring. The official naming citation was published by the Minor Planet Center on 25 August 1991 (M.P.C. 18643).
