= Evžen Plocek =

Evžen Plocek (29 October 1929, Jihlava – 9 April 1969, Jihlava) was a Czech man (reform communist) who committed suicide, at age 39, by self-immolation as a political protest. He is usually named together with Jan Palach and Jan Zajíc whose self-immolations were similar political protests as Plocek's, but his death did not bring the same attention as the death of his predecessors.

== Death ==
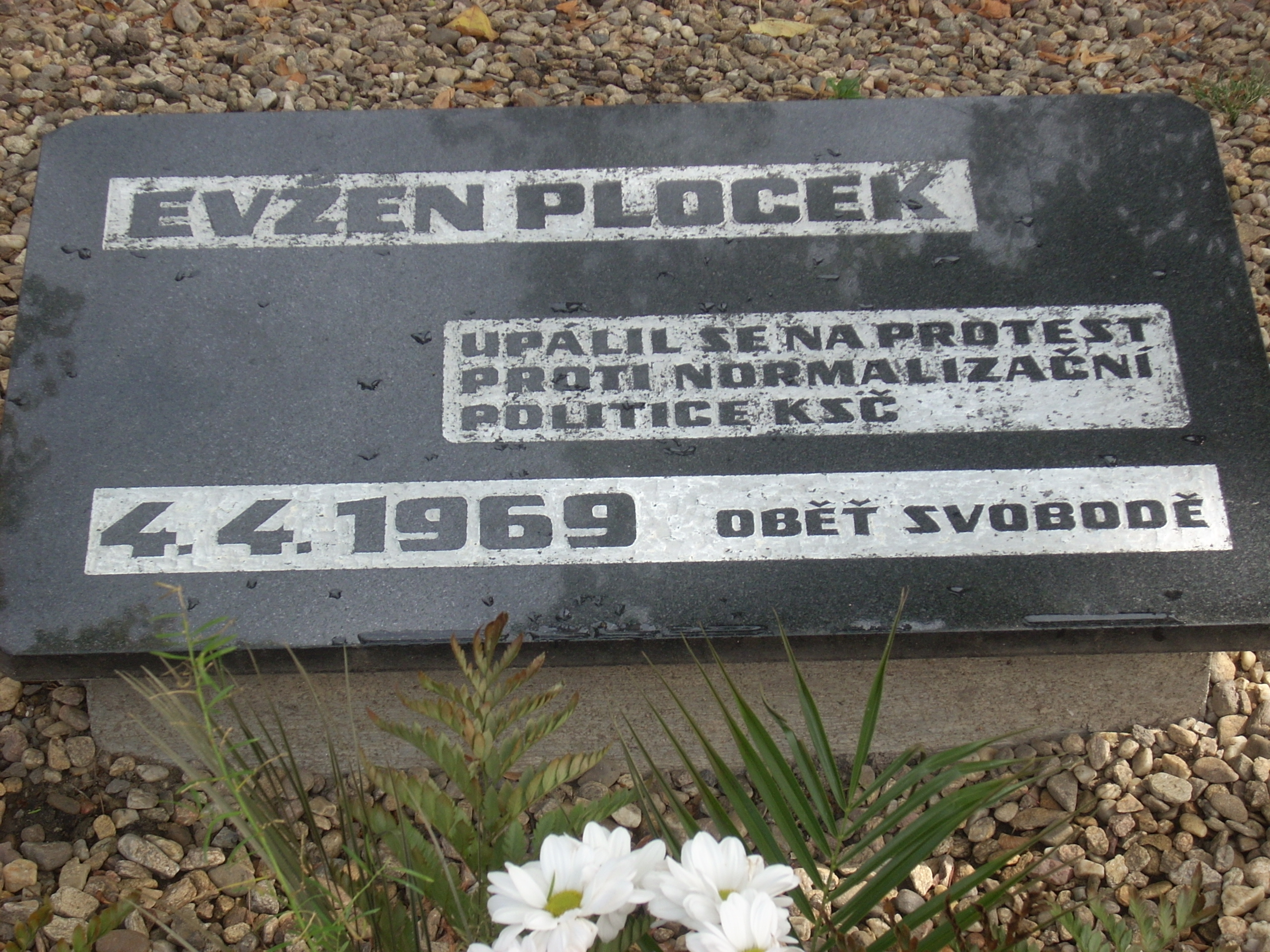
Memorial plaque at the site of Plocek's self-immolation

Evžen Plocek was a toolmaker by trade, but by 1968 had become deputy director of the car-parts company Motorpal and a candidate to the extraordinary meeting of the Czech Communist Party (see Prague Spring). On Good Friday, 4 April 1969, several months after the Warsaw Pact invasion of Czechoslovakia in August 1968, Plocek set himself on fire in Míru Square (now called Masarykovo Square) in Jihlava in protest at what he saw as Soviet aggression. His was the fourth suicide by self-immolation after an accountant, Ryszard Siwiec, set himself on fire in Warsaw on 8 September 1968 dying four days later in hospital, and two Czech students, Jan Palach and Jan Zajíc, who burned themselves to death in Prague on 16 January 1969, and 25 February 1969, respectively. Just before his immolation he dropped a paper with the text: "Truth is revolutionary – wrote Antonio Gramsci" and "I am for a human face – I can't stand those without any feelings. Evžen". Evžen Plocek was taken to the Jihlava hospital, where he died on 9 April.

In spite of a number of difficulties, the workers at Motorpal were able to hold a public funeral in Jihlava. Not a word of Evžen Plocek's self-immolation made it into the central press, however. Today, there is a simple plaque on the ground near the place of Plocek's death.

== See also ==
- Thích Quảng Đức
- Ryszard Siwiec
- Jan Palach
- Jan Zajíc
- Romas Kalanta
- List of political self-immolations
