= Jan Palach =

Czech student who self-immolated (1948–1969)

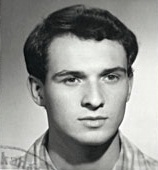
- Palach's student ID photo, 1968
- Born: 11 August 1948; Všetaty, Czechoslovakia (now Czech Republic)
- Died: 19 January 1969 (aged 20); Prague, Czechoslovakia
- Cause of death: Burns from self-immolation
- Resting place: Olšany Cemetery
- Education: Charles University
- Occupation: Student
- Known for: Self-immolation after the 1968 invasion of Czechoslovakia
- Awards: Order of Tomáš Garrigue Masaryk (in memoriam)

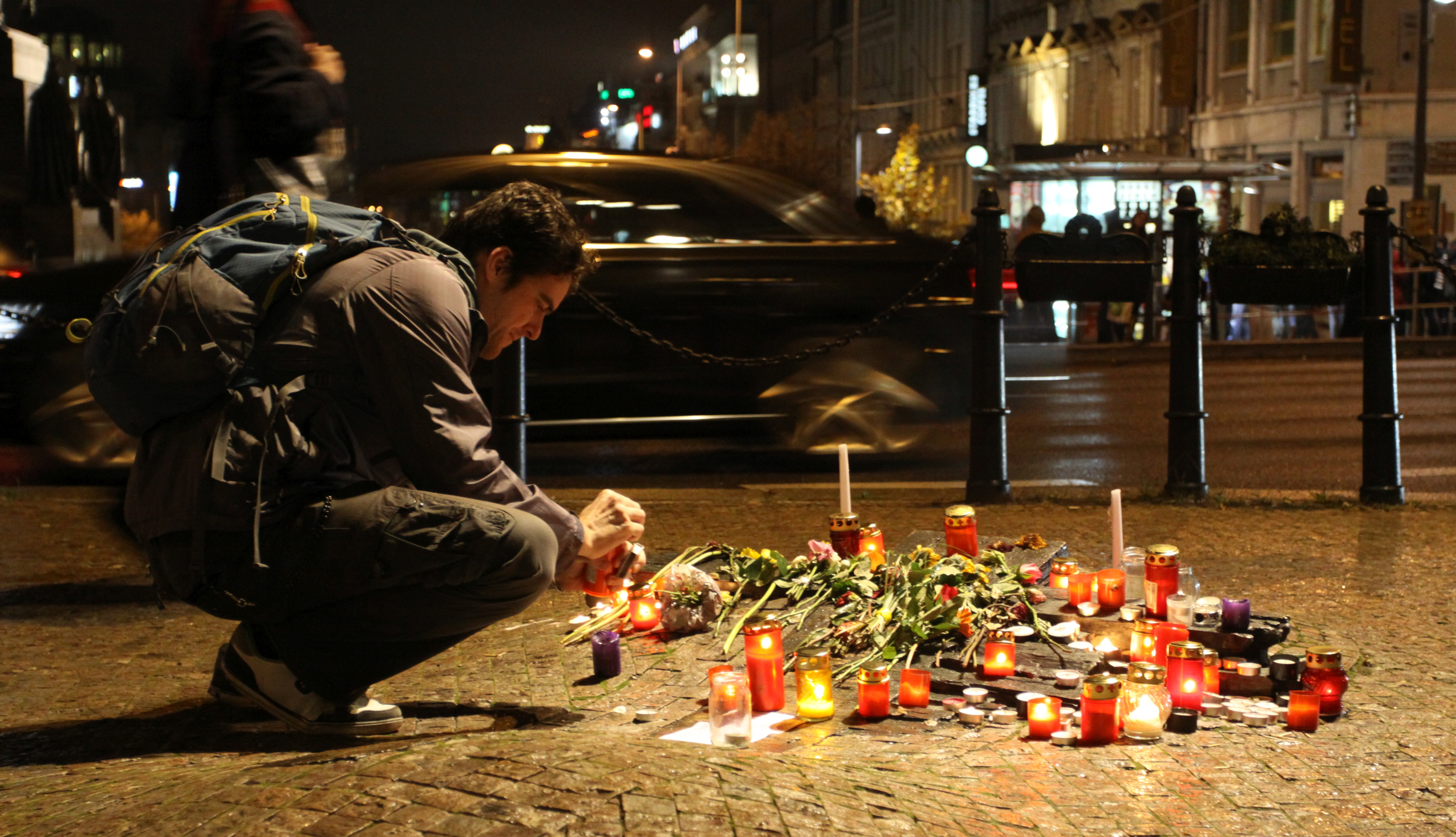
The memorial to Jan Palach and Jan Zajíc in front of the National Museum during the 25th anniversary of the Velvet Revolution

Jan Palach (Czech pronunciation: [jan ˈpalax]; 11 August 1948 – 19 January 1969) was a Czech student of history and political economics at Charles University in Prague. His self-immolation in 1969 at the age of 20 was a political protest against the Warsaw Pact invasion of Czechoslovakia in 1968 which brought an end to the Prague Spring.

== Early life ==
Palach was born in and attended elementary school in Všetaty, where he was an avid reader of Jules Verne. He was an average student. His father died when Palach was 13 years old and Palach was raised in part by his grandfather. His brother, Jiří, was 7 years older. In 1963, Palach began studies at a gymnasium in Mělník. He graduated in 1966 and unsuccessfully applied to Charles University. He then attended Prague School of Economics but in September 1968, he transferred to the Faculty of Arts at Charles University, where he studied history and political economics. In the summer of 1967, Palach worked on a chicken farm in the Soviet Union. There, he instigated a strike action with other Czech students, the result of which got their working hours reduced from 10 to 8 per day and catering was improved. On November 7, 1968, he participated in a demonstration for Czech independence.

== Death ==
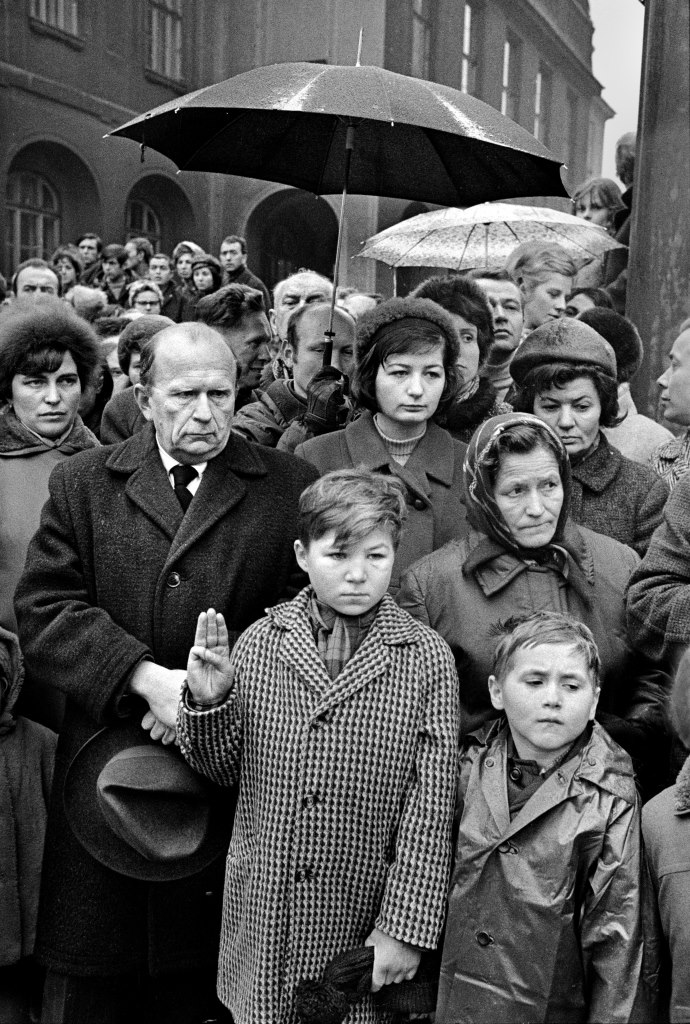
Palach's funeral (a small group of mourners photographed by Miloň Novotný) turned into a major protest against the occupation.

On 16 January 1969, in response to the Warsaw Pact invasion of Czechoslovakia in which the Soviet Union invaded Czechoslovakia to crush the Prague Spring reforms of Alexander Dubček's government, Palach committed self-immolation in Wenceslas Square, suffering burns to 85% of his body.

According to Jaroslava Moserová, a burns specialist who was the first to provide care to Palach at the Charles University Faculty Hospital, Palach did not set himself on fire to protest against the Soviet occupation, but did so to protest against the "demoralization" of Czechoslovak citizens caused by the occupation.

Palach's self-immolation was the third act of that kind after those of Ryszard Siwiec in Poland, which was successfully suppressed by the authorities and went mostly forgotten until the Revolutions of 1989. Palach was not known to be aware of Siwiec's protest.

The burning at the stake of Jan Hus in 1415 for his beliefs may have been an inspiration for Palach's self-immolation.

According to a letter he sent to several public figures, an entire clandestine resistance organization had been established with the purpose of practising self-immolation until their demands were met; however, it seems that such a group never existed. The demands declared in the letter were the abolition of censorship and a halt to the distribution of Zprávy, the official newspaper of the Soviet occupying forces. In addition, the letter called for the Czech and the Slovak peoples to go on a general strike in support of these demands. An earlier draft of the letter that Palach wrote also called for the resignation of a number of pro-Soviet politicians, but that demand did not make it into the final version, which included the remark that "our demands are not extreme; on the contrary". Palach died from his burns three days after his act, in the hospital. On his deathbed, he was visited by a female acquaintance from his college and by a student leader, to whom he had addressed one of the copies of his letter. It was reported that he had pleaded for others not to do what he had done but instead to continue the struggle by other means, although it has been doubted whether he really said that.

The funeral of Palach turned into a major protest against the occupation. A month later, on 25 February, another student, Jan Zajíc, burned himself to death in the same place. This was followed in April of the same year by Evžen Plocek in Jihlava, and by others. People in other Warsaw Pact countries emulated his example such as Hungarians Sándor Bauer on 20 January 1969 and Márton Moyses on 13 February 1970.

== Posthumous recognition ==
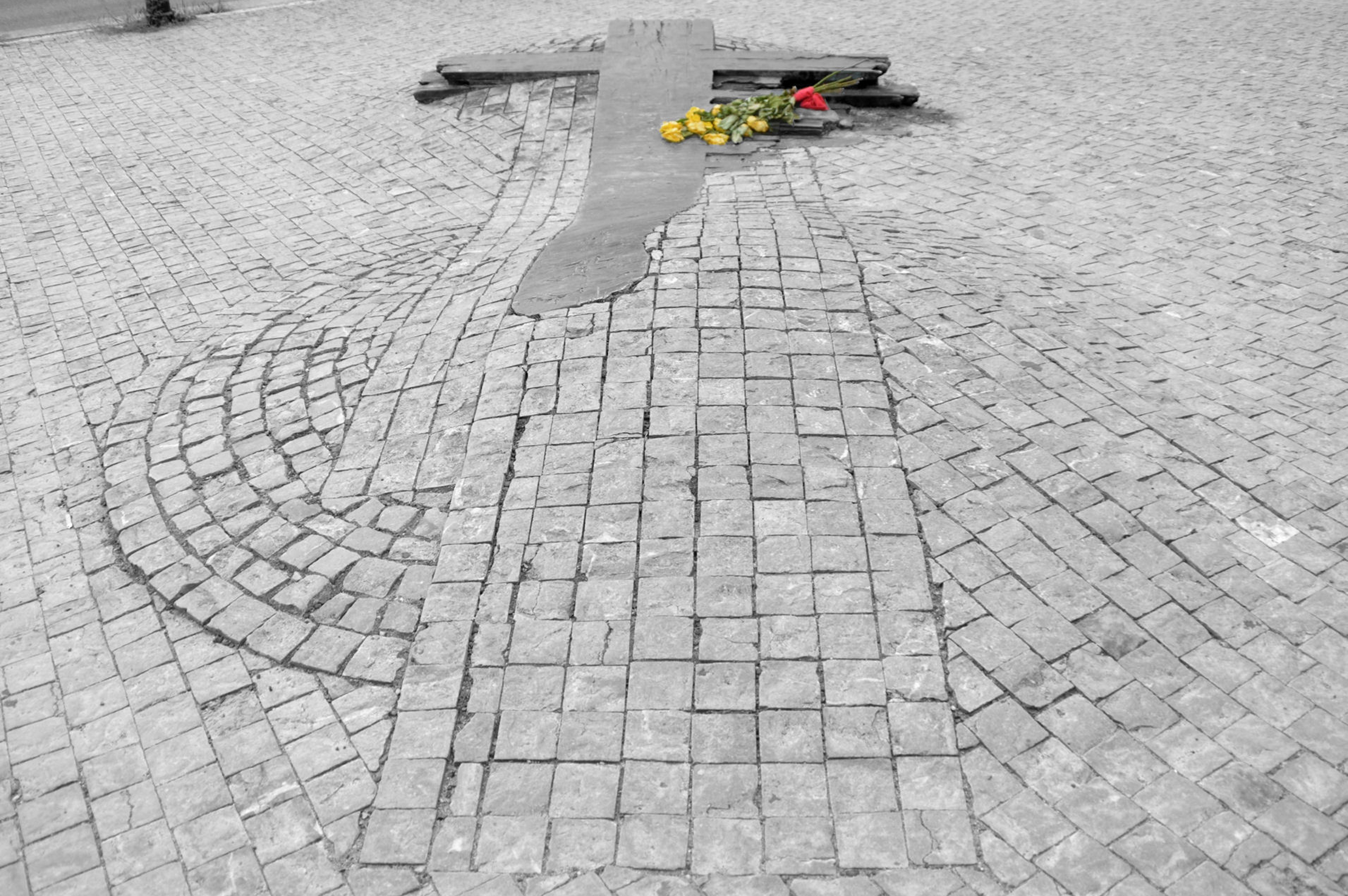
The memorial to Jan Palach and Jan Zajíc in front of the National Museum on Wenceslas Square by the Czech artist Barbora Veselá

Palach was initially interred in Olšany Cemetery in Prague. As his gravesite was becoming a national shrine, the StB (Czechoslovak secret police) set out to destroy any memory of Palach's deed and exhumed his remains during the night of 25 October 1973. They then cremated his body and sent the ashes to his mother in his home town of Všetaty; the body of an anonymous old woman from a rest-home was laid in the vacated grave. Palach's mother was not allowed to deposit the urn in the local cemetery until 1974. On 25 October 1990, Palach's ashes were officially returned to his initial gravesite in Prague.

On the 20th anniversary of Palach's death, between 15 and 21 January 1989, protests in Prague ostensibly in memory of Palach (but intended anticommunist demonstrations) escalated into what would be called "Palach Week". They were suppressed by the police, who beat demonstrators and used water cannons, often catching passers-by in the fray. Palach Week is considered one of the catalyst demonstrations which preceded the fall of communism in Czechoslovakia 10 months later.

After the Velvet Revolution, Palach (along with Zajíc) was commemorated in Prague by a bronze cross embedded at the spot where he fell outside the National Museum, as well as the naming of Jan Palach Square in his honour. Czech astronomer Luboš Kohoutek, who left Czechoslovakia the following year, named an asteroid, 1834 Palach, which was discovered on 22 August 1969 after Palach. There are several other memorials to Palach in cities throughout Europe, including a small memorial inside the glacier tunnels beneath the Jungfraujoch in Switzerland.

Several copycat suicides may have been influenced by the example of Palach and his media popularity. In the spring of 2003, six young Czechs burned themselves to death, including a 19-year-old student from Humpolec who burned himself on almost the same spot in front of the National Museum where Palach burnt himself, leaving a suicide note explicitly referring to Palach and the others who killed themselves in 1969.

== Cultural references ==
=== In music ===
The music video for the song "Club Foot" by the band Kasabian is dedicated to Palach. The composition "The Funeral of Jan Palach" performed by The Zippo Band and composed by Phil Kline is a tribute. He is mentioned in The Stranglers' bassist, Jean-Jacques Burnel's 1979 solo album, Euroman Cometh.

In their 1983 song "Nuuj Helde" the Janse Bagge Bend (from the Netherlands) asks whether people know why Jan Palach burned. This song was meant to make the general public aware of heroes.

Norwegian songwriter and singer Åge Aleksandersen mentioned Palach's name in his 1984 song "Va det du Jesus".

Norwegian songwriter Hans Rotmo mentioned Palach's name among other notable political activists such as Victor Jara and Steve Biko in his 1989 song "Lennon Street".

American metal band Lamb of God wrote a song on their studio album VII: Sturm und Drang, entitled "Torches", that was inspired by Palach's actions.

Italian songwriter Francesco Guccini wrote the song "La Primavera di Praga" in dedication to Jan Palach, compared to religious scholar Jan Hus: "Once again Jan Hus is burning alive". Polish singer Jacek Kaczmarski wrote a song about Palach's suicide, called "Pochodnie" ("Torches"). The Italian far-right folk group "La Compagnia dell'Anello" released a song dedicated to him, titled "Jan Palach".

Luxembourg-based Welsh composer Dafydd Bullock was commissioned to write "Requiem for Jan Palach" (op 182) to commemorate the fortieth anniversary of Palach's suicide. It includes a setting of words which appeared briefly on a statue in Wenceslas Square after the event, before being erased by the authorities: "Do not be indifferent to the day when the light of the future was carried forward by a burning body".

Belgian composer François Glorieux wrote "Requiem for Jan Palach" on his "Praha" album.

Spanish composer Jorge Grundman wrote his 2018 work "Jan & Jan for Chorus and Symphonic Orchestra (op 68)" as an hommage to Jan Palach and Jan Zajic. The work premiered at the Spanish National Auditorium of Music in 2019 to commemorate the fiftieth anniversary of the self-immolation of both students. The chorus sings an adaptation of Palach's letter addressing his family.

Israeli musician Arik Einstein sang about the Prague Spring in his 1969 song "Prague", and dedicated a verse to Palach's self-immolation.

=== In literature ===
In 1969, Slovenian poet Edvard Kocbek published a poem entitled "Rocket", in which he juxtaposed two events from that year: the Apollo 11 landing, "a senseless act of technological nihilism", and "a rocket named Palach that launched itself into history, its smoky message was seen even through the darkest glasses".

Jan Palach is named in context in the 1992 poem by Axel Reitel, "Ústí nad Labem" in the book Das exil und der Sandberg Gedichte 1976–1990 published by Boesche-Verlag Berlin und Haifa, referring a school-holiday near Lake Mácha and entertained about this self-immolation against dictatorship.

Jan Palach is named without context in the 2005 novel by Salman Rushdie, Shalimar the Clown, referring to the 1992 Los Angeles riots.

Pakistani poet Qazi Zafar Iqbal paid tribute to Jan Palach in the form of a poem in Urdu. The poem is included in his book named Ghurfa-e-Shab (The Window of Night) published in 2006 in the city of Lahore.

A sequence of poems exploring the implications of Palach's death called One Match by the poet Sheila Hamilton were published in issue 51 of the Dorset-based poetry serial, Tears in the Fence (ed. David Caddy) in 2010.

Czech poet Miroslav Holub wrote a poem entitled the "Prague of Jan Palach" (1969) in memory of the martyr. A line from the poem translated into English by George Theiner reads, "where Man ends/ the flame begins."

In the Soviet Union, poet Vsevolod Nekrasov dedicated a poem to Palach.

=== In film, radio and television ===
French documentary filmmaker Raymond Depardon directed a 1969 film about Jan Palach.

Palach featured in a monologue radio play entitled Torch No 1 on BBC Radio 4, directed by Martin Jenkins, and written by David Pownall. Palach was played by Karl Davies.

The three-part 2013 Czech-Polish television show Burning Bush, directed by Agnieszka Holland, is situated around the events that happened after Jan Palach's self-immolation.

The 2018 film Jan Palach, directed by Robert Sedláček, chronicles Palach's life before his self-immolation. Palach is played by Viktor Zavadil.

=== In fine and performing arts ===
After seeking political asylum in the United States, Polish artist Wiktor Szostalo commemorated Jan Palach in his Performance for Freedom proclaiming "I am Jan Palach. I'm a Czech, I'm a Pole, a Lithuanian, a Vietnamese, an Afghani, a betrayed You. After I've burnt myself a thousand times, perhaps we'll win".

On January 19, 2009, the 40th anniversary of the death of Jan Palach, a statue sculpted by András Beck was installed in Mělník, the city where Jan Palach did his studies.

== Place names ==
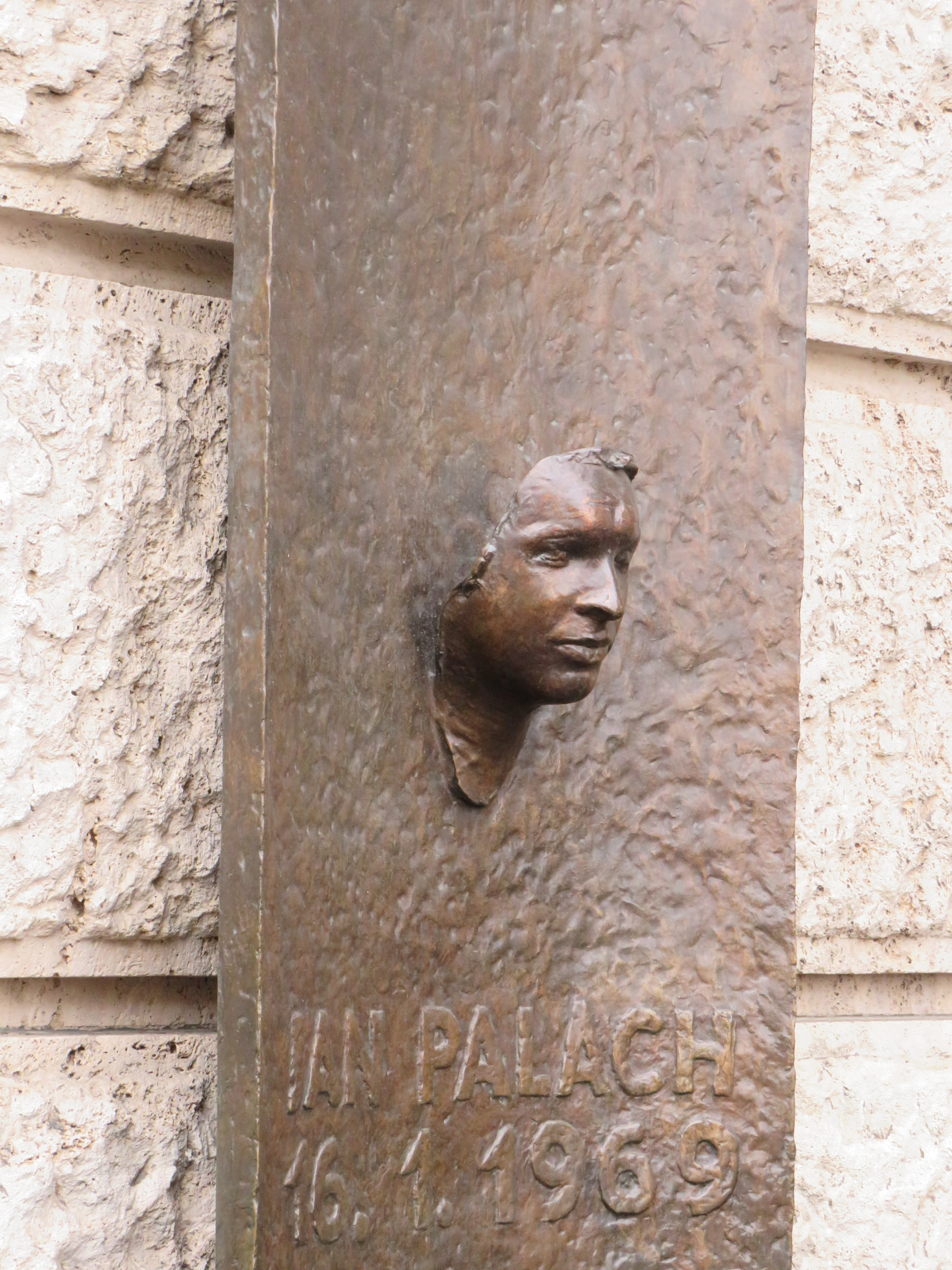
Memorial in Jan Palach Square (Faculty of Arts).

In the Czech Republic, many towns have streets or squares named after Palach, including Jan Palach Square in central Prague. He also had streets named after him in Luxembourg City (Luxembourg), Angers and Parthenay (France), Kraków (Poland), Assen, The Hague and Haarlem (Netherlands), Varna (Bulgaria) and Nantwich (United Kingdom). In Rome and Milan (Italy), there is a central square named after Palach with a commemorative statue. Even on the remote island of the Republic of Mauritius in the Indian ocean, there is a bus station situated in the central city of Curepipe named after him.

The oldest rock club in Croatia, situated in Rijeka since 1969, is named Palach. The main bus and metro express terminal in the town of Curepipe, Mauritius is named after Jan Palach. A student hall in Venice, Italy on the Giudecca island has also been given the name of Jan Palach.

== See also ==
- Jan Zajíc
- Thích Quảng Đức
- Ryszard Siwiec
- Evžen Plocek
- Romas Kalanta
- Oleksa Hirnyk
- Liviu Cornel Babeş
- Mohamed Bouazizi
- List of political self-immolations
