= Self-immolation =

Suicide by setting oneself on fire

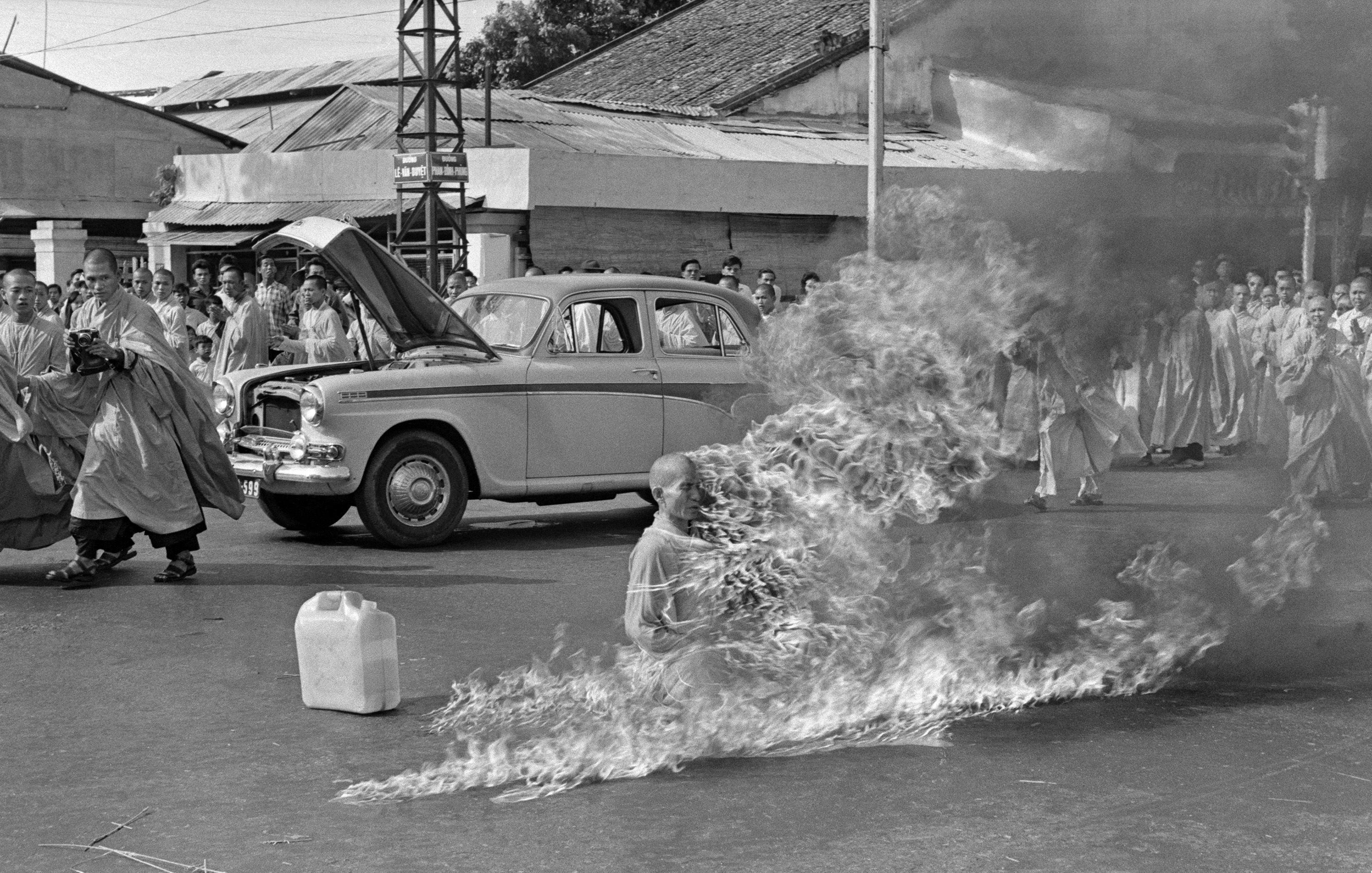
In 1963, Thích Quảng Đức protested by self-immolation during South Vietnam's Buddhist crisis.

Self-immolation is the act of setting oneself on fire. It is mostly done for political or religious reasons, often as a form of protest or in acts of martyrdom, and known for its disturbing and violent nature.

== Etymology ==
The English word immolation originally meant (1534) "killing a sacrificial victim; sacrifice" and came to figuratively mean (1690) "destruction, especially by fire". Its etymology was from Latin immolare "to sprinkle with sacrificial meal (mola salsa); to sacrifice" in ancient Roman religion. In the Mewar region of India, women practiced a form of self-immolation called Jauhar to avoid being raped by invading armies.

== Effects ==
Self-immolators frequently use accelerants before igniting themselves. This, combined with the self-immolators' refusal to protect themselves, can produce hotter flames and deeper, more extensive burns. Self-immolation has been described as excruciatingly painful. Later, when the burns become severe, nerves are burnt and the self-immolator loses sensation at the burnt areas. Some self-immolators can die during the act from inhalation of toxic combustion products, hot air, and flames.

The human body has an inflammatory response to burnt skin, which happens after 25% is burnt in adults. This response leads to blood and body fluid loss. If the self-immolator is not taken to a burn centre in less than four hours, they are more likely to die from shock. If no more than 80% of their body area is burnt and the self-immolator is younger than 40 years old, there is a survival chance of 50%. If the self-immolator has over 80% burns, the survival rate drops to 20%.

== History ==
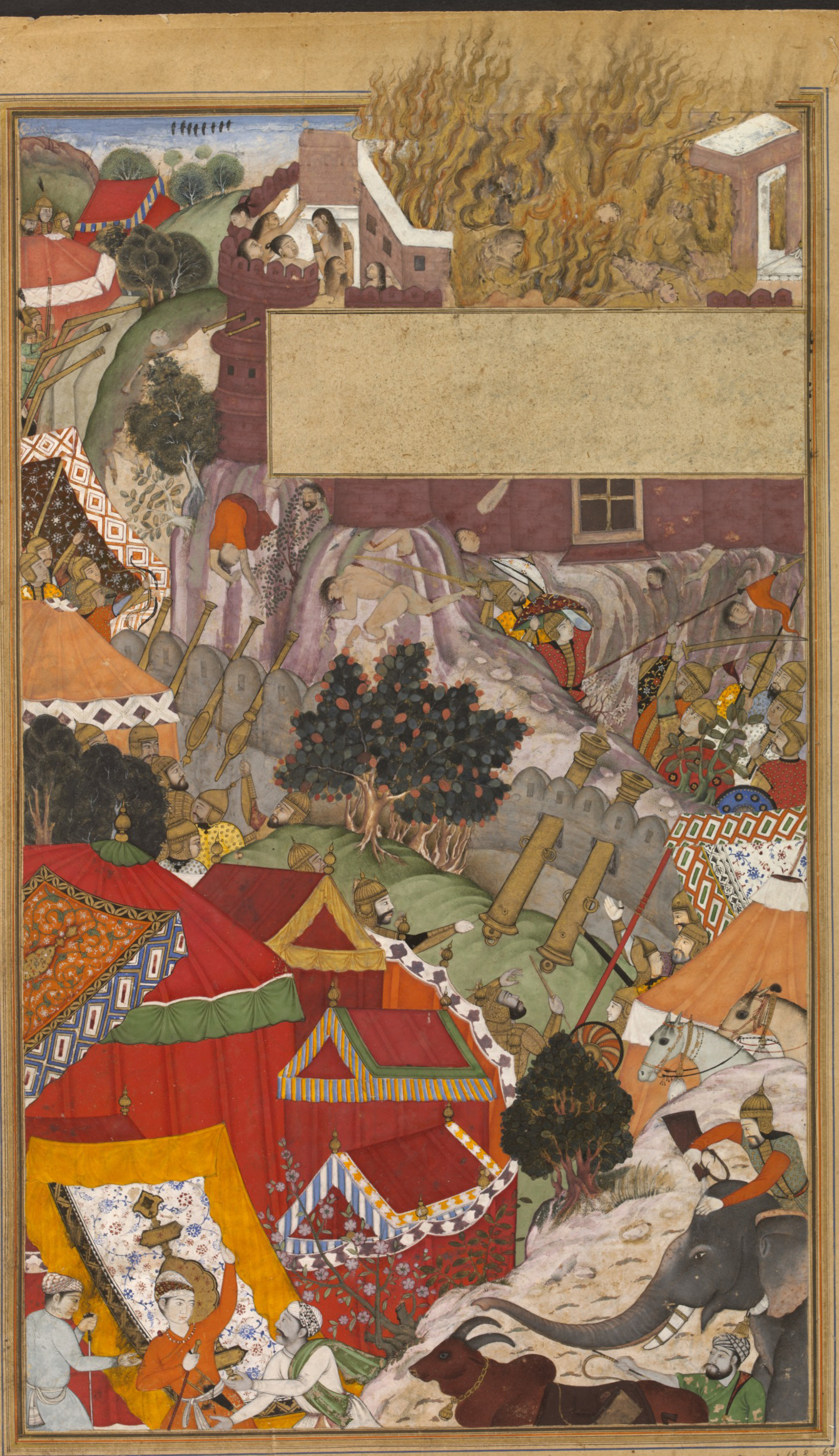
The self-immolation (jauhar) of the Rajput women, during the Siege of Chittorgarh in 1568

Self-immolation is tolerated by some elements of Mahayana Buddhism and Hinduism, and it has been practiced for many centuries, especially in India, for various reasons, including jauhar, political protest, devotion, and renouncement. An example from mythology includes the practice of Sati when the Hindu goddess Parvati's incarnation of the same name (see also Daksayani) legendarily set herself on fire after her father Daksha insulted her in the Daksha yajna for having married Shiva, the ascetic god. Shiva with Parvati and the army of ganas attacked Daksha's yajna and destroyed the sacrifice, and Shiva with Parvati as Virabhadra and Bhadrakali together beheaded and killed Daksha. Later, Daksha was revived by Shiva with Parvati and the Daksha yajna was completed when Daksha apologized to both of them with the sacrifice's participants also present there. Certain warrior cultures, such as those of the Charans and Rajputs, also practiced self-immolation.

There are several well-known examples from antiquity to modern times. Kalanos, also spelled Calanus (Ancient Greek: Καλανὸς) (c. 398 – 323 BCE), was an ancient Indian gymnosophist, and philosopher from Taxila who accompanied Alexander the Great to Persis and later, after falling ill, self-immolated by entering into a pyre, in front of Alexander and his army, predicting Alexander's death in Babylon at the same year, and Alexander died in Babylon some months after the prophecy of Kalanos. Diodorus Siculus called him Caranus (Ancient Greek: Κάρανος).

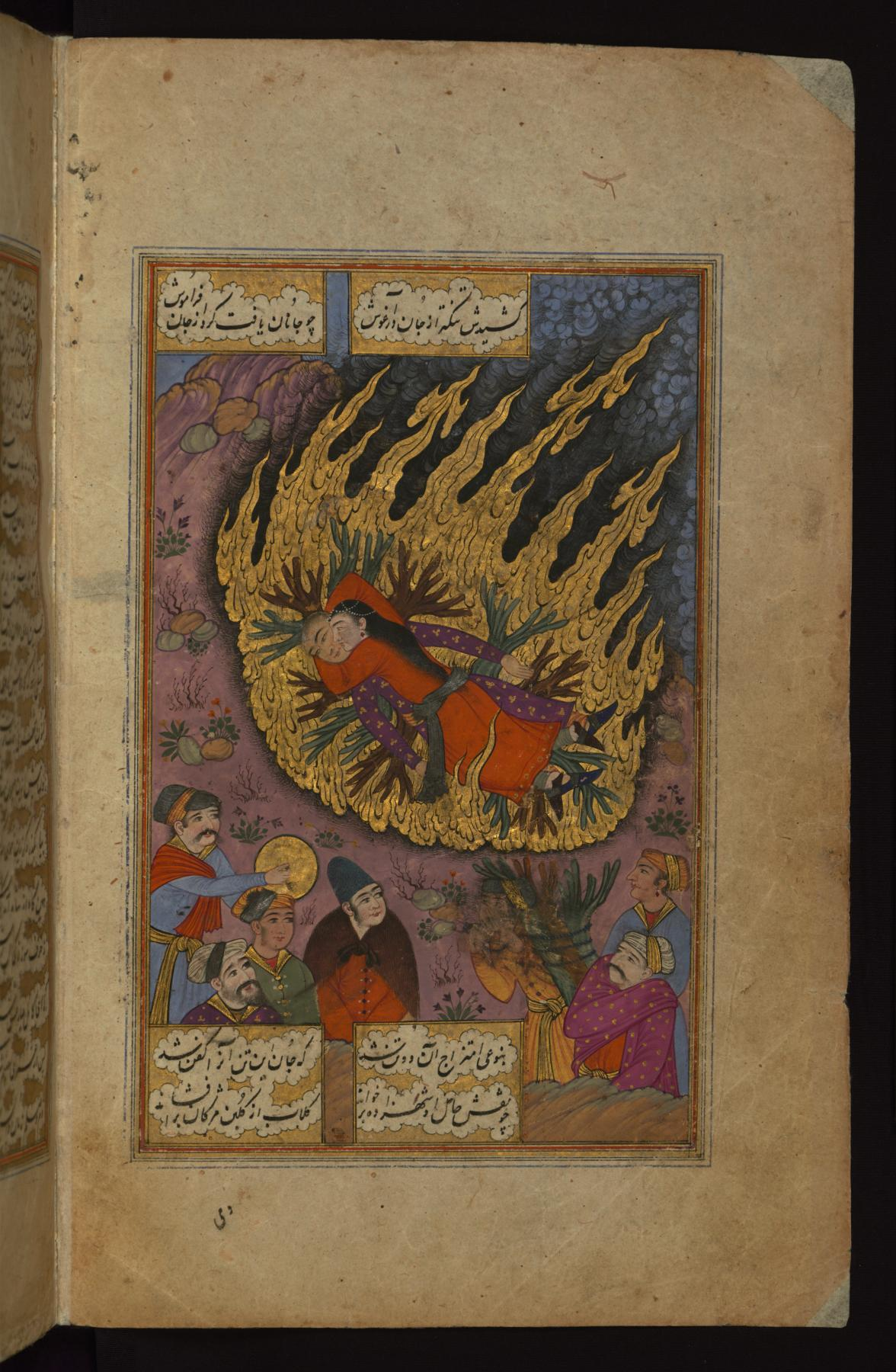
A Hindu widow burning herself with the corpse of her husband (sati), 1657

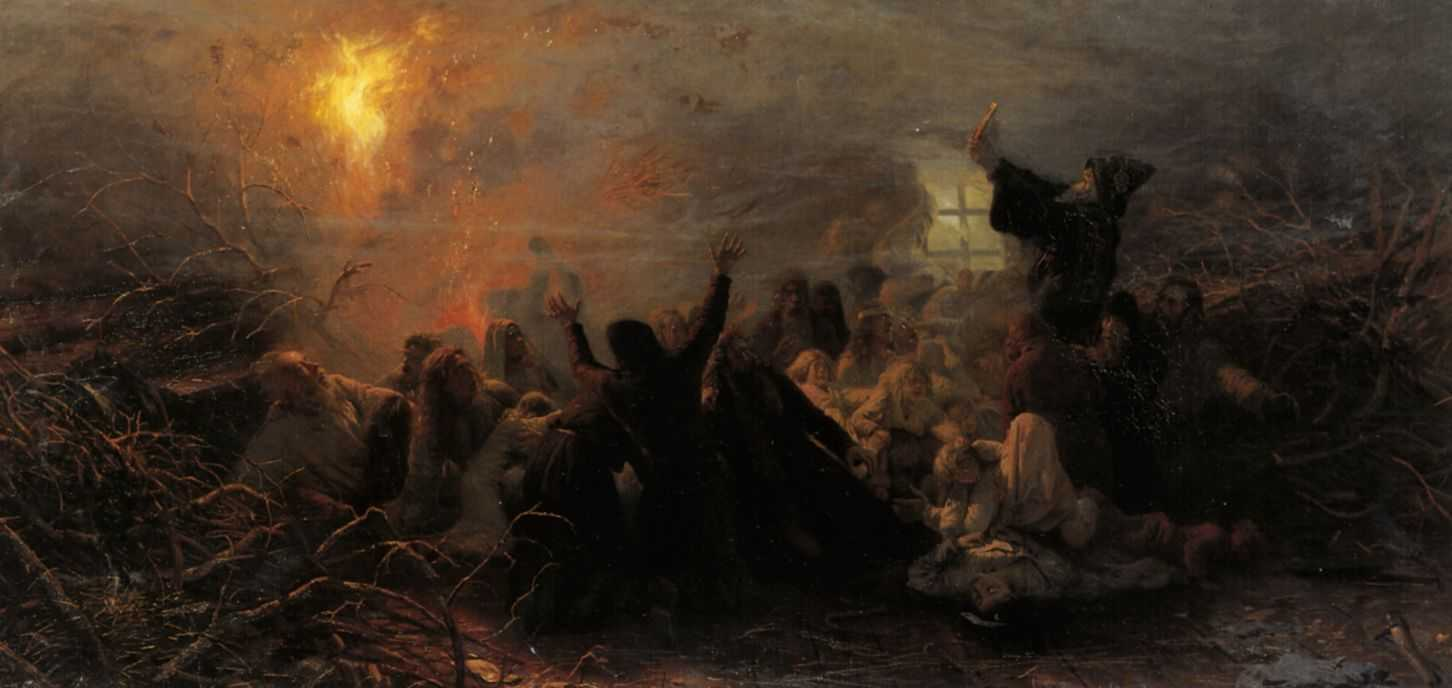
"Samosozhigateli (those who burn themselves)" by Grigoriy Myasoyedov, depicting Old Believers

Zarmanochegas was a monk of the Sramana tradition (possibly, but not necessarily a Buddhist) who, according to ancient historians such as Strabo and Dio Cassius, met Nicholas of Damascus in Antioch around 22 BC and burnt himself to death in Athens shortly thereafter.

The monk Fayu (Chinese: 法羽) (d. 396) carried out the earliest recorded Chinese self-immolation. He first informed the "illegitimate" prince Yao Xu (Chinese: 姚緒)—brother of Yao Chang who founded the non-Chinese Qiang state Later Qin (384–417)—that he intended to burn himself alive. Yao tried to dissuade Fayu, but he publicly swallowed incense chips, wrapped his body in oiled cloth, and chanted while setting fire to himself. The religious and lay witnesses were described as being "full of grief and admiration".

Following Fayu's example, many Buddhist monks and nuns have used self-immolation for political purposes. While some monks did offer their bodies in periods of relative prosperity and peace, there is a "marked coincidence" between acts of self-immolation and times of crisis, especially when secular powers were hostile towards Buddhism. For example, Daoxuan's (c. 667) Xu Gaoseng Zhuan (Chinese: 續高僧傳; lit. 'Continued Biographies of Eminent Monks') records five monastics who self-immolated on the Zhongnan Mountains in response to the 574–577 persecution of Buddhism by Emperor Wu of Northern Zhou (known as the "Second Disaster of Wu").

For many monks and laypeople in Chinese history, self-immolation was a form of Buddhist practice that modeled and expressed a particular path that led towards Buddhahood.

Historian Jimmy Yu has stated that self-immolation cannot be interpreted based on Buddhist doctrine and beliefs alone but the practice must be understood in the larger context of the Chinese religious landscape. He examines many primary sources from the 16th and 17th century and demonstrates that bodily practices of self-harm, including self-immolation, were ritually performed not only by Buddhists but also by Daoists and literati officials who either exposed their naked body to the sun in a prolonged period of time as a form of self-sacrifice or burned themselves as a method of procuring rain.

During the Great Schism of the Russian Church, entire villages of Old Believers burned themselves to death in an act known as "fire baptism" (self-burners: samosozhigateli). A 1973 study by a prison doctor suggested that people who choose self-immolation as a form of suicide are more likely to be in a "disturbed state of consciousness", such as epilepsy.

== Political protest ==
Regarding self-immolation as a form of political protest, the 14th Dalai Lama said in 2013 and 2015:

I think the self-burning itself [is a] practice of non-violence. These people, you see, they [could instead] easily use bomb explosive, [causing more casualties]. But they didn't do that. Only sacrifice their own life. So this also is part of practice of non-violence.

Self-immolations are often public and political statements that are often reported by the news media. They can be seen by others as a type of altruistic suicide for a collective cause, and are not intended to inflict physical harm on others or cause material damage.

=== South Vietnam Buddhist crisis ===
The Buddhist crisis in South Vietnam was triggered by perceived religious discrimination under the administration of Ngô Đình Diệm, the country's first president and a Catholic. Thích Quảng Đức immolated himself in protest in June 1963, a long-established practice in Vietnam and China but largely unfamiliar to the Western press at the time. Several other monks likewise self-immolated as a form of protest.

=== U.S. involvement in the Vietnam War ===
The example set by self-immolators sparked similar acts between 1963 and 1971, most of which occurred in Asia and the United States in conjunction with protests opposing the Vietnam War. Researchers counted almost 100 self-immolations covered by The New York Times and The Times.

On 2 November 1965, Norman Morrison, an anti-war activist, doused himself in kerosene and set himself on fire below the office of Secretary of Defense Robert McNamara at the Pentagon, to protest United States involvement in the Vietnam War.

=== Soviet bloc ===
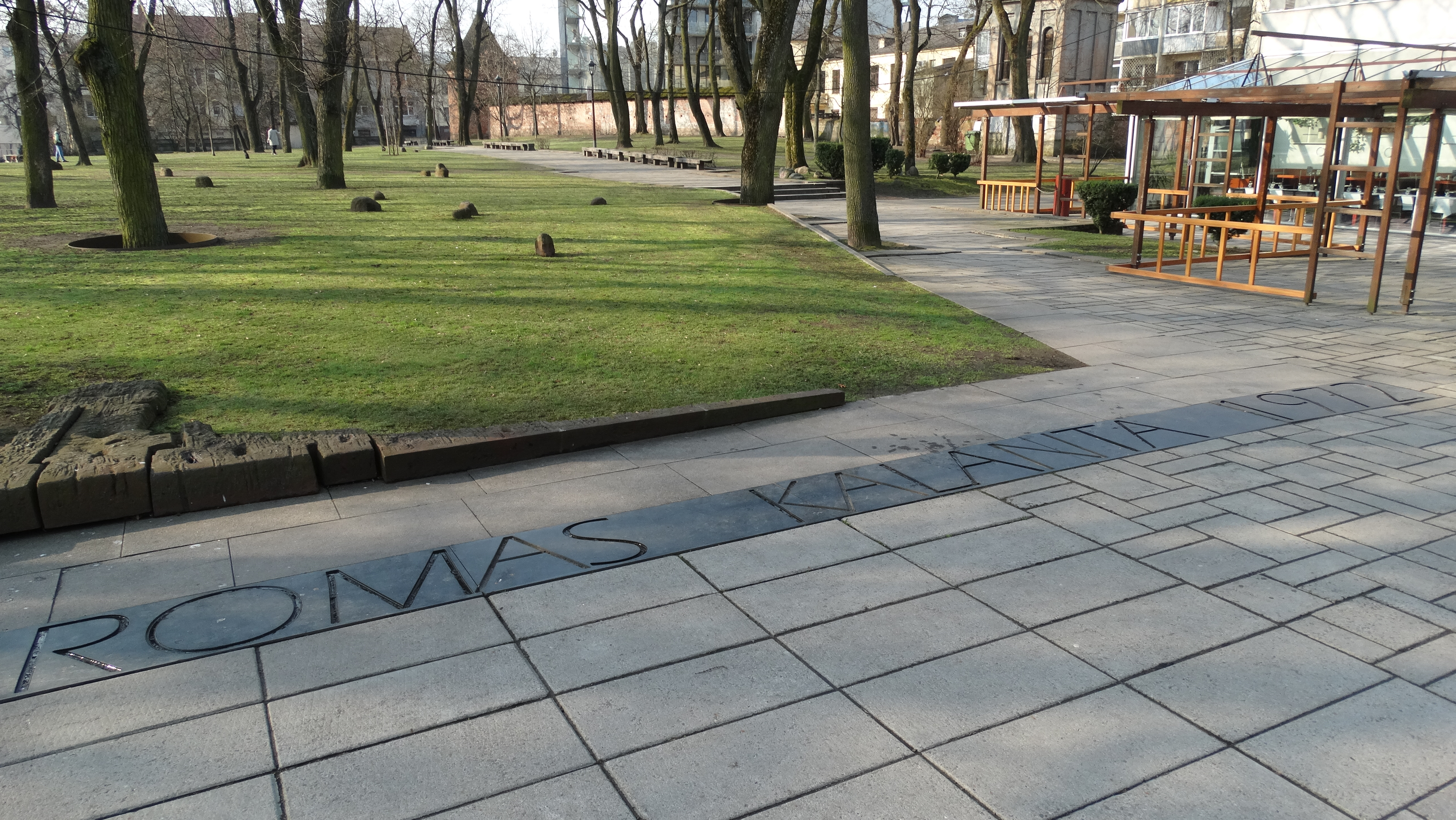
The memorial to Romas Kalanta in Kaunas in the place of his self-immolation. The inscription reads Romas Kalanta 1972.

In 1968, the practice spread to the Soviet bloc with the self-immolation of Polish accountant and Armia Krajowa veteran Ryszard Siwiec, Hungarian student and protester against communist dictatorship Sándor Bauer, as well as those of two Czech students, Jan Palach and Jan Zajíc, and of toolmaker Evžen Plocek, in protest against the Warsaw Pact invasion of Czechoslovakia.

In 1972, Romas Kalanta, a 19-year-old Lithuanian student, self-immolated to protest against the Soviet regime in Lithuania, sparking the 1972 unrest in Lithuania; another 13 people self-immolated in that same year.

In 1978, Ukrainian dissident and former political prisoner Oleksa Hirnyk burnt himself near the tomb of the Ukrainian poet Taras Shevchenko protesting against the russification of Ukraine under Soviet rule. On 2 March 1989, Liviu Cornel Babeș set himself on fire on the Bradu ski slope at Poiana Brașov as a sign of protest against the Communist regime.

=== India and Sri Lanka ===
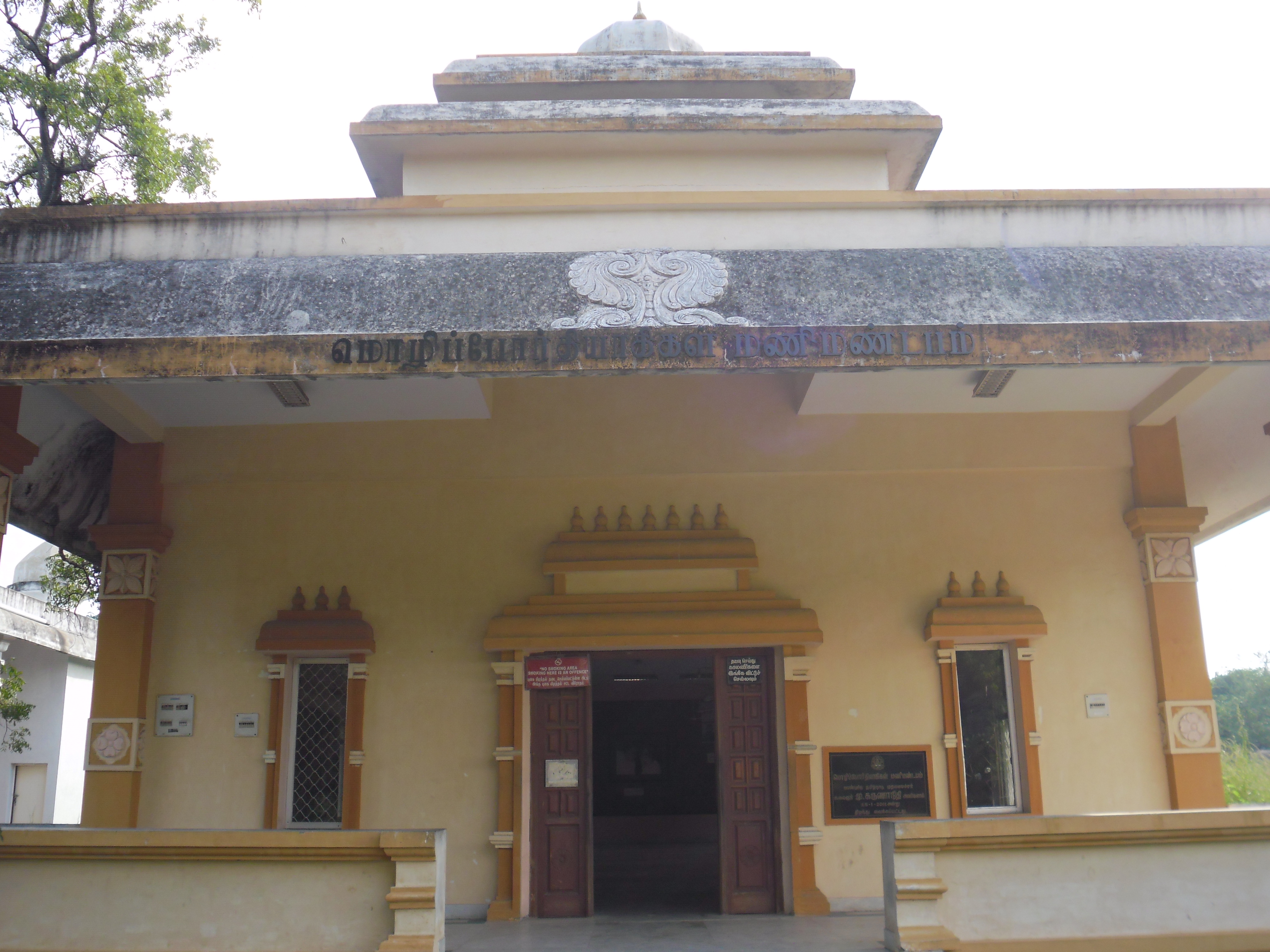
A memorial for those who died in the anti–Hindi-imposition agitations in Chennai

In India, as many as 1,451 and 1,584 self-immolations were reported in 2000 and 2001, respectively. A particularly high wave of self-immolation was recorded during the Mandal Commission protests of 1990 against the caste-based system of reservation. Tamil Nadu has the highest number of self-immolators in India to date, although not all of them were politically motivated. Tamils in Indian and Sri Lankan territories have protested against the imposition of the Hindi language, the assassination of Indira Gandhi, and their mistreatment by the Sri Lankan government.

=== China and Tibet ===
As of June 2022, there had been 161 confirmed self-immolations in Tibet and ten others made in solidarity outside of Tibet. The 14th Dalai Lama placed the blame on "cultural genocide" by the Chinese. The Chinese government blamed the Dalai Lama and his supporters for inciting these acts. Several Tibetan scholars criticized the Dalai Lama for not speaking more strongly against self-immolations. In 2013, the Dalai Lama questioned the effectiveness of self-immolations but said they are caused by Beijing. The United States called on both sides to moderate their stance.

On July 2, 2026, Tibetan activist Lobga Rangzen set himself on fire near the UN Headquarters in New York while holding a Tibetan national flag, in protest of the newly enacted Chinese “Law on Promoting Ethnic Unity and Progress,” and was later pronounced dead.

=== Arab Spring ===
A wave of self-immolation suicides occurred in conjunction with the Arab Spring protests in the Middle East and North Africa, with at least 14 recorded incidents. The 2010–2011 Tunisian revolution was sparked by the self-immolation of Mohamed Bouazizi. Other cases followed during the 2011 Algerian protests and the 2011 Egyptian revolution.

=== United States and the Gaza war ===
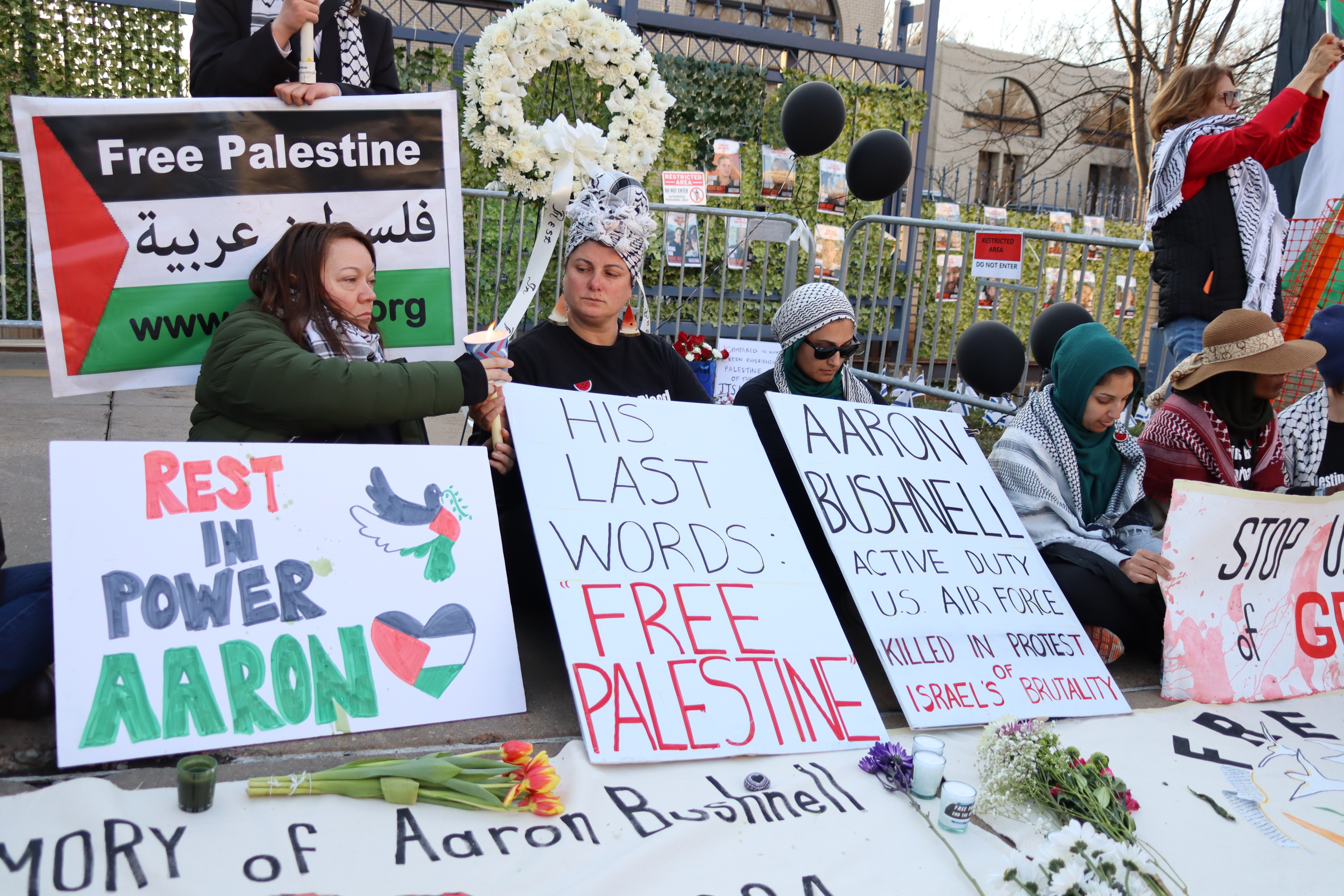
A vigil to Aaron Bushnell held outside of the Israeli embassy in Washington, D.C.

On 1 December 2023, a protester self-immolated in front of the Israeli consulate in Atlanta while draped in a Palestinian flag in response to the Gaza war.

On 25 February 2024, Aaron Bushnell, an active-duty U.S. Air Force service member, self-immolated outside the Israeli Embassy in Washington, D.C., in protest against the United States' ongoing support for Israel. He lit himself on fire while shouting "Free Palestine". It was filmed and livestreamed on Twitch. Bushnell died of his injuries on 26 February.

On 11 September 2024, a man named Matt Nelson self-immolated outside the Israeli consulate and the Four Seasons hotel in Boston, Massachusetts, in protest of the United States' ongoing support for Israel. He recorded a video urging the United States government to stop sending weapons to Israel.

On 5 October 2024, a photojournalist named Samuel Mena Jr. attempted to self-immolate in front of the White House in Washington, D.C., at a pro-Palestinian protest. He survived with burn injuries to his arm and was taken to a hospital.

=== 2013 Bulgarian protests against the first Borisov cabinet ===
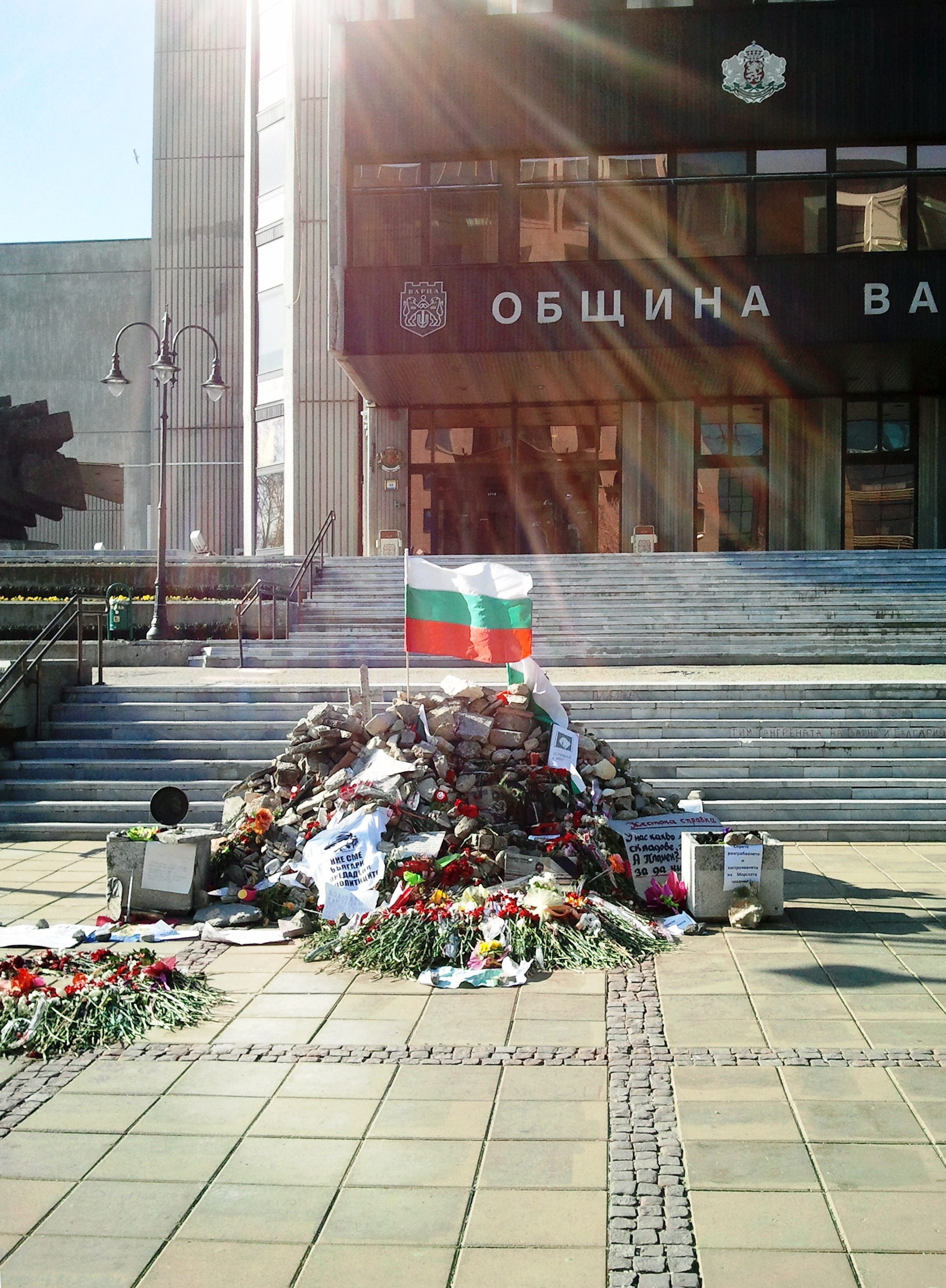
Stones placed in memory of Plamen Goranov at the site of his self-immolation in front of Varna’s municipal building – a spontaneous citizen memorial symbolizing public grief and protest

On 20 February 2013, Bulgarian protester Plamen Goranov set himself on fire in front of the municipal building in Varna during nationwide protests against government corruption and monopolies. Goranov, a photographer and mountaineer, was protesting the alleged ties between organized crime and local authorities, specifically targeting Varna’s mayor Kiril Yordanov, associated with the TIM business group. He sustained burns over 80% of his body and died on 3 March 2013, Bulgaria’s national Liberation Day.

Goranov's self-immolation became a symbol of the 2013 Bulgarian protests, galvanizing public outrage and contributing to the resignations of both the Varna mayor and the national government. He was widely compared to Jan Palach and Mohamed Bouazizi, whose self-immolations marked major protest movements in Czechoslovakia and Tunisia, respectively.

Public tributes followed his death, including vigils and spontaneous memorials. A symbolic mound of stones, adorned with flowers and the Bulgarian flag, was placed at the site of his protest—seen both as a reference to his mountaineering background and as an allusion to Ivan Vazov’s poem Gramada, a metaphor for collective moral protest.

On 25 October 2024, eleven years after his death, an official memorial plaque was installed in front of the Varna municipal building to honor his memory.

== See also ==
- Sati (practice)
- Anumarana
- Jauhar
- Altruistic suicide

Other cases of self-immolation:

- Aaron Bushnell
- Albert Razin
- Charles R. Moore
- David Buckel
- George Winne Jr.
- Homa Darabi
- Irina Slavina
- Jeon Tae-il
- Malachi Ritscher
- Nizar Issaoui
- Oskar Brüsewitz
- Peter Tyrrell
- Piotr Szczęsny
- Roger Allen LaPorte
- Sahar Khodayari
- Tsewang Norbu
- Wynn Bruce

== Bibliography ==
- King, Sallie B. (2000). "They Who Burned Themselves for Peace: Quaker and Buddhist Self-Immolators during the Vietnam War", Buddhist-Christian Studies 20, 127–150 (subscription required)
- Kovan, Martin (2013). "Thresholds of Transcendence: Buddhist Self-immolation and Mahāyānist Absolute Altruism", Part One. Journal of Buddhist Ethics 20, 775–812
- Kovan, Martin (2014). "Thresholds of Transcendence: Buddhist Self-immolation and Mahāyānist Absolute Altruism", Part Two. Journal of Buddhist Ethics 21, 384–430
- Patler, Nicholas. Norman's Triumph: the Transcendent Language of Self-Immolation Quaker History, Fall 2015, 18–39.
