= Jan Zajíc =

Czech protester

- One of very few photos of Zajíc
- Born: Vítkov, Czechoslovakia
- Died: 25 February 1969; Prague, Czechoslovakia
- Cause of death: Burns from self-immolation
- Occupation: Student
- Honours: Order of Tomáš Garrigue Masaryk

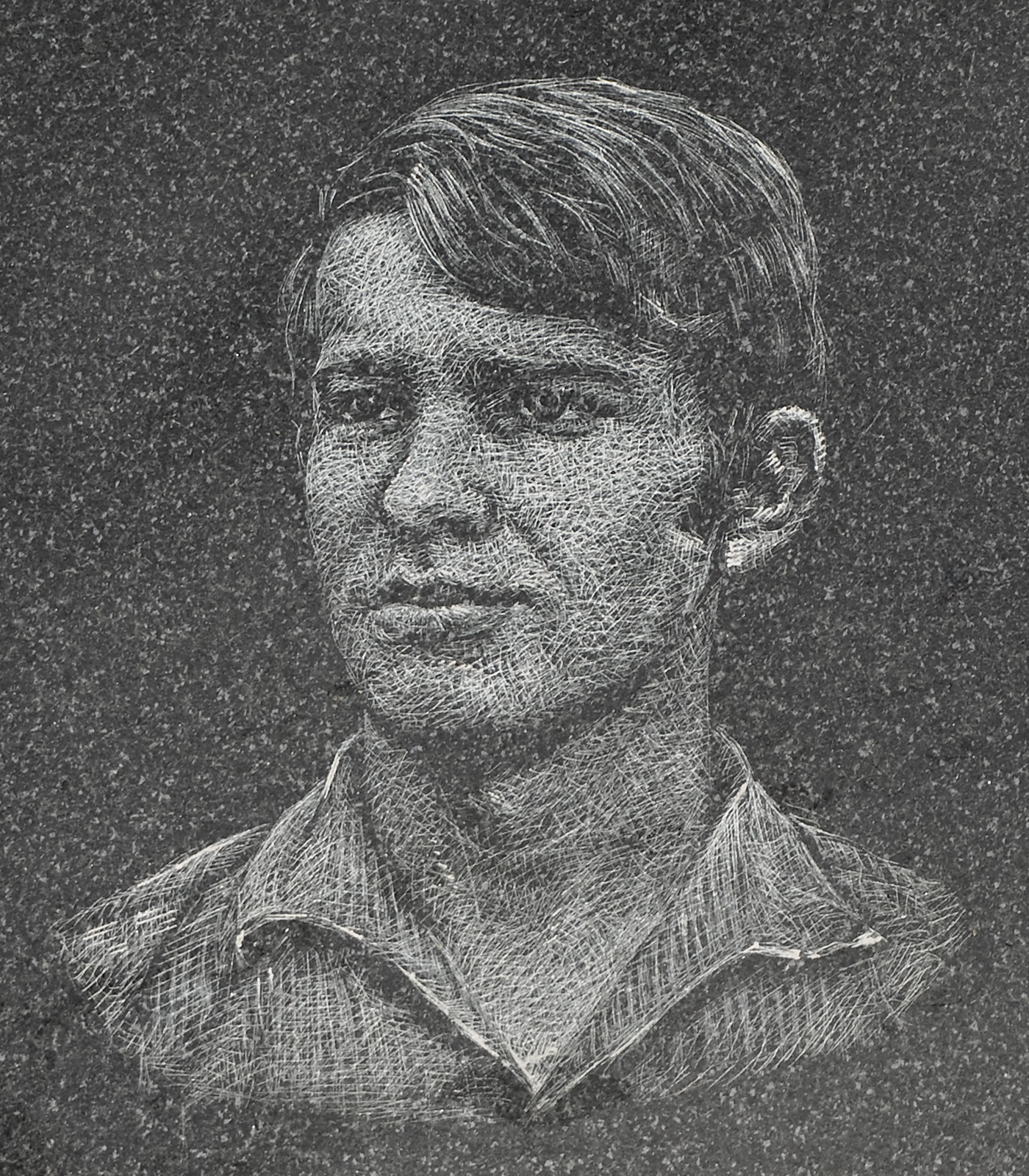
Portrait on a memorial plaque

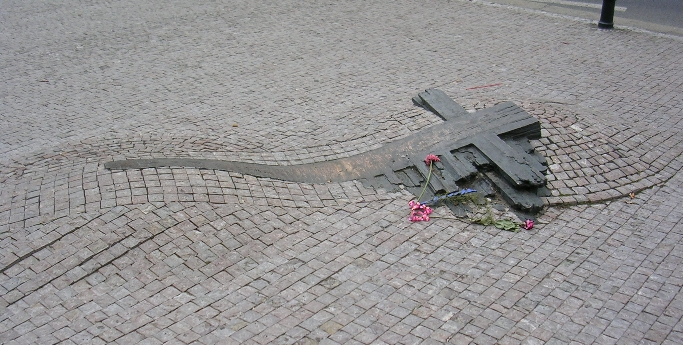
The memorial to Jan Palach and Jan Zajíc in front of the National Museum

Jan Zajíc (died 25 February 1969) was a Czech student who killed himself by self-immolation as a political protest.

== Biography ==
He was a student of the Střední průmyslová škola železniční (Industrial Highschool of Railways) technical college in Šumperk, specializing in railways, and was also interested in poetry and humanities.

In 1969 he took part in a hunger strike and a commemoration ceremony by students for Jan Palach near the statue of Saint Wenceslas in Prague.

On the day of the twenty-first anniversary of the Communist takeover (25 February 1948), he travelled to Prague accompanied by three other students. His intention was to warn the public against the forthcoming political "normalization" of the country. He had several letters challenging the people to fight against the Warsaw Pact's military occupation of Czechoslovakia. Around 1:30 in the afternoon he walked into the passageway of the building at No. 39 on Wenceslas Square and ignited his chemical-soaked clothes. He was unable to run out of the door, and collapsed and died in the hallway.

In a letter he left behind he wrote:

Mommy, daddy, brother, little sister!

I will already be dead or close to death when you read this letter. I know what a severe blow my act will be to you, but don't be angry at me. Unfortunately, we are not alone in this world. I am not doing this because I would be tired of life; quite the contrary, I cherish it too much.

Hopefully, my act will make life better. I know life's price; it is the most precious thing. But I want a lot for you, for everyone, so I have to pay a lot. Do not lose your heart after my sacrifice. Tell Jacek to study harder and Marta too. You must never accept injustice, be it in any form. My death will bind you. I am sorry that I will never see you or that, which I loved so much. Please forgive me for arguing with you so much. Do not let them make me a madman.

Say hello to the boys, the river, and the forest.

— Jan Zajíc

The police prohibited his burial in Prague because they feared demonstrations, such as the ones that followed the burial of Jan Palach. He was later buried in his hometown of Vítkov.

After the Velvet Revolution, a bronze cross was set into the ground in front of the National Museum in Wenceslas Square to honour both Palach and Zajíc.

His death mask by sculptor Olbram Zoubek is situated at his high school (now Vyšší odborná škola a střední průmyslová škola Šumperk).

== Legacy ==
In 2019, a graphic novel was published about Zajíc's life and suicide.

== See also ==
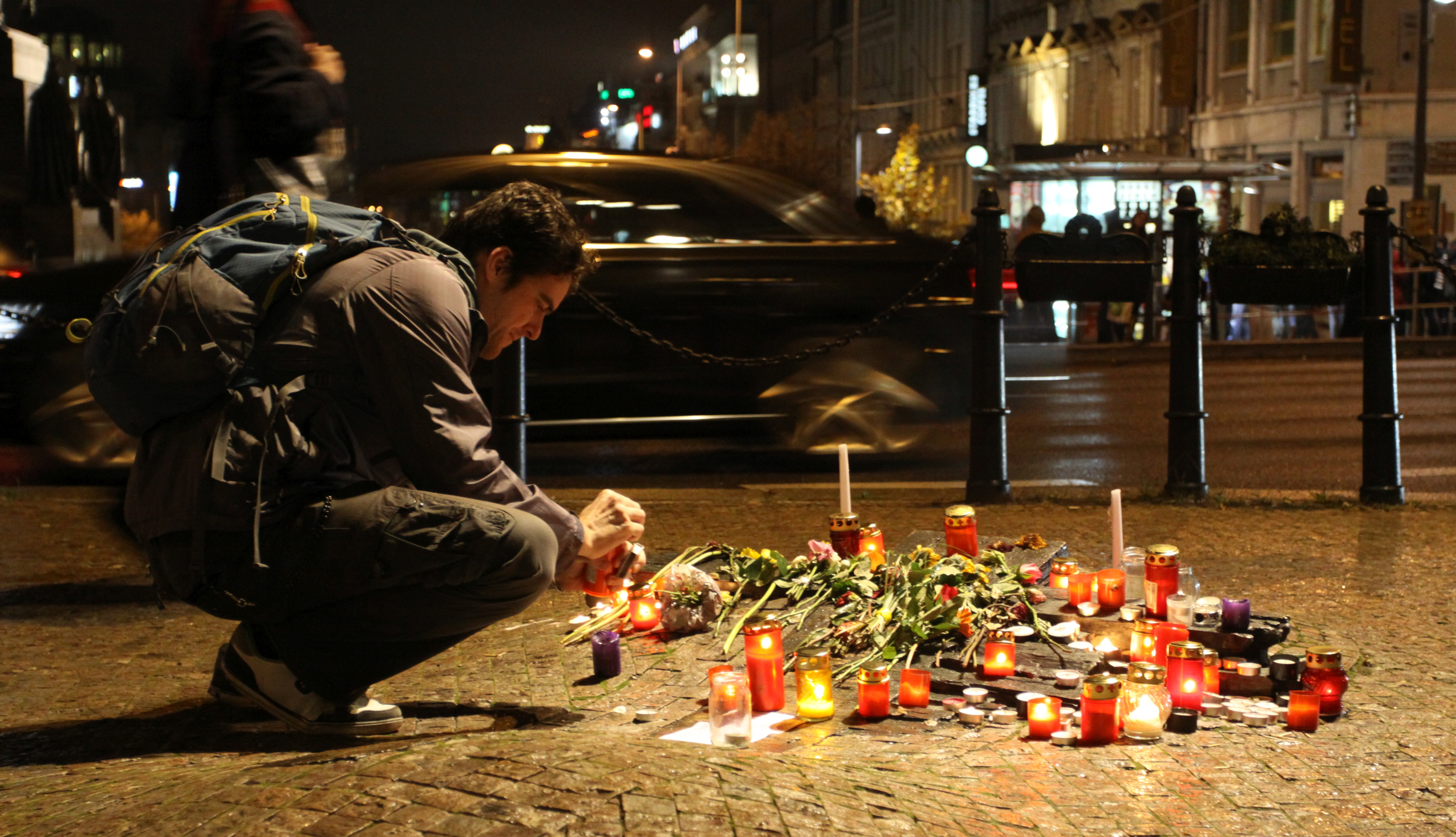
The memorial to Jan Palach and Jan Zajíc in front of the National Museum during 25th anniversary of Velvet Revolution

- Thích Quảng Đức
- Ryszard Siwiec
- Jan Palach
- Evžen Plocek
- Romas Kalanta
- List of political self-immolations
