= Ryszard Siwiec =

Polish accountant known for anti-communist self-immolation

- Born: 7 March 1909; Dębica, Austria-Hungary
- Died: 12 September 1968 (aged 59); Warsaw, Polish People's Republic
- Cause of death: Burns from self-immolation
- Occupations: accountant, teacher
- Known for: self-immolation
- Spouse: Maria Siwiec (m. 1945)
- Children: 5
- Awards: Order of Tomáš Garrigue Masaryk In memoriam (2001) Order of Polonia Restituta Komtur (2003) Order of the White Double Cross In memoriam (2006)

Ryszard Siwiec (Polish pronunciation: [ˈrɨʂart ˈɕivjɛt͡s]; 7 March 1909 – 12 September 1968) was a Polish accountant and former Home Army resistance member who was the first person to die by self-immolation in protest against the Warsaw Pact invasion of Czechoslovakia. Although his act was captured by a motion picture camera, Polish press omitted any mention of the incident, which was successfully suppressed by the authorities. Siwiec prepared his plan alone, and few people realized what he tried to achieve with his sacrifice. His story remained mostly forgotten until the fall of communism, when it was first recounted in a documentary film by Polish director Maciej Drygas. Since then, Siwiec has been posthumously awarded a number of Czech, Slovak, and Polish honours and decorations.

Siwiec's death preceded the much better known self-immolation of Jan Palach in Prague four months later. Siwiec was the first person from Central and Eastern Europe to immolate himself in protest of the invasion.

== Biography ==
Siwiec was born in Dębica on 7 March 1909, under the Austrian Partition of Poland, then part of Austria-Hungary. He graduated from the Lwów University with a degree in philosophy. Siwiec worked as an accountant since the 1930s in Przemyśl, where he moved shortly after graduation. During World War II he escaped forced labour for the Germans by taking employment as a gardener and joined the Armia Krajowa (Home Army), the Polish resistance movement. Ryszard Siwiec married in 1945 and had five children.

== Self-immolation ==
According to friends and family, he had extensive historical knowledge and was deeply disillusioned with the reality of communist Poland. He supported the protesting students during the March 1968 Polish political crisis in Poland, printing bibuła leaflets and asking his daughter to distribute them. According to health professionals, he was of sound mind, and fully rational, at the time of his suicide. Siwiec planned his self-immolation months in advance, writing out a last will in April, and leaving written and tape-recorded statements explaining his revulsion at both the Warsaw Pact invasion of Czechoslovakia and the Polish People's Republic's participation in it.

Siwiec obtained passes to a national harvest festival taking place on 8 September 1968 at the 10th-Anniversary Stadium in Warsaw. His goal was to have his act be witnessed by nearly 100,000 spectators, including numerous journalists and the national leadership of the Polish United Workers' Party. He set himself ablaze during one of the festival dances using a flammable solvent. This method of protest was likely inspired by recent series of similar protests by Buddhist monks in Vietnam, most notably that of Thích Quảng Đức. He had a banner with the words "For our freedom and yours" and "Honour, Fatherland" as well as some leaflets, which he is said to have thrown around right before the incident, though neither attracted much attention, and both items are primarily mentioned only in the documents of the investigating secret police. He refused immediate help and shouted "I protest". He retained consciousness after the flames had been extinguished, giving brief statements, as well as later when he was transferred to a hospital (Szpital Praski), where he was able to communicate with the medical personnel, and where he received a brief visit from his wife. In the hospital, he was put under police surveillance, dying four days later on 12 September.

== Significance and remembrance ==
The incident was immediately suppressed by the authorities. A story invented on the spot was that it was an accident caused by drinking vodka and smoking, or spontaneously combusting, aiming to divert interest to gossip and portray Siwiec as an irresponsible drunk. He was also declared mentally ill.

Despite many attendees at the festival, there were relatively few witnesses, and the incident did not cause any delay in the main proceedings. Journalists and others knew that they would not be able to publish any photographs or movies, so those aware of the incident did not bother recording it other than by accident, nor did any try to investigate it afterward. Most of the few photographs of the incidents have been destroyed or forgotten and lost. Siwiec was censored out of official photographs of the Central Photographic Agency (Centralna Agencja Fotograficzna), which had a monopoly on issuing photos for the press in the era of communist Poland. His act was captured in a 7-second film by a motion picture camera of the Polish Film Chronicle, but the official newsreels of the festival omitted any mention of the incident. This footage however survived, mislabeled either by accident or purpose, until it was rediscovered over twenty years later.

Polish secret police (Służba Bezpieczeństwa) made a routine investigation that ended quickly due to the "death of the culprit", followed by routine low-key surveillance of his friends and family, during which it intercepted Siwiec's last letter to his wife (delivered decades later). Overall, the authorities had little trouble suppressing the events, as none of the relatively few witnesses have shown any particular desire to make the event more widely known. There was some gossip about the incident, with most people considering it a suicide rather than an accident, but the reason for it was unclear, and no one connected Siwiec's dramatic actions to contemporary political events. As publicist Stefan Kisielewski wrote in his diary two days after Siwiec's death, "There are rumours about a self-immolation [during the festival] but none knows the reason for it."

=== Funeral ===
Siwiec's funeral in Przemyśl was well attended, but did not turn into a political manifestation; it was guarded by police, and secret agents spread rumors aimed at damaging Siwiec's reputation. His family reported that while some acquaintances were supportive and aware of Siwiec's true purpose, many turned away from them, either intimidated by the authorities or believing the stories that Siwiec had been drunk or mentally ill.

Siwiec's timing has been described as unfortunate, as he chose to commit his act during a dance (mazurka), at which time his cry was muffled due to the sounds of an orchestra playing. Some, like Tomas Kavaliauskas or Krzysztof Kąkolewski, have speculated that if he had chosen to act moments earlier, during a speech by Polish communist leader Władysław Gomułka, first secretary of the Polish United Workers Party, the commotion he caused would have likely interrupted it and his message might have been witnessed more widely. Publicist Antoni Zambrowski noted that many other self-immolators like Czech Jan Palach had cooperated with anti-communist opposition movements and left messages and other documents which helped publicize their activities; Siwiec worked alone and so the Polish anti-communist opposition which he identified with was not aware of his action and the meaning behind it until much later.

Radio Free Europe learned about the incident a few days or months (sources vary) after the incident but did not consider the message reliable nor newsworthy, as the broadcaster was also unaware of its political context. This changed only after the famous self-immolation of Palach in Prague four months later, on 19 January 1969, and after RFE received more information, which clarified the political statement that Siwiec wanted to make. The RFE broadcast about Siwiec aired in February, March or April (sources vary) that year. If Palach became aware of Siwiec's actions, it would thus have been due to word of mouth, rather than from RFE.

=== Recognition ===
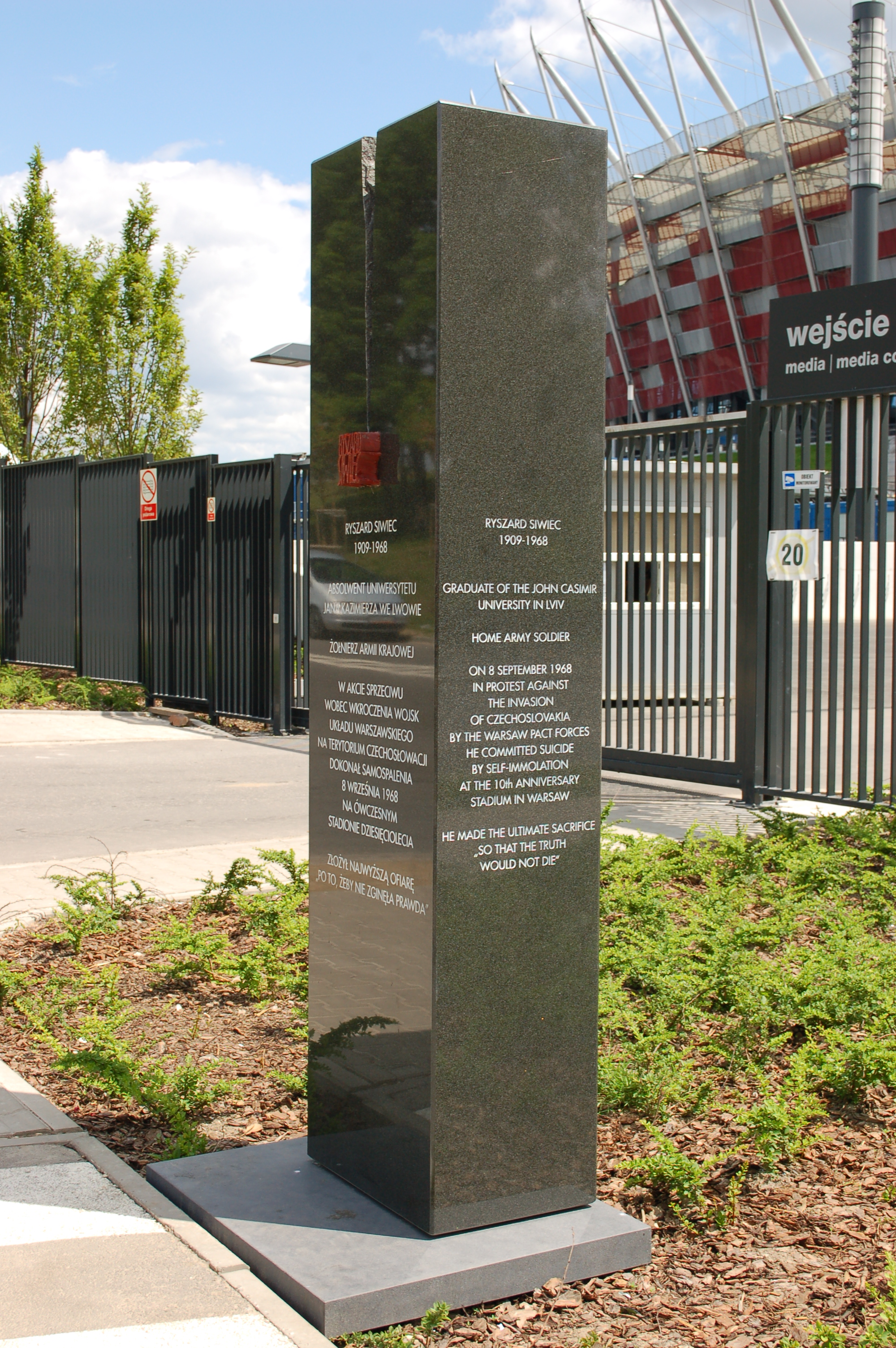
Obelisk on Ryszard Sywiec Street next to the National Stadium

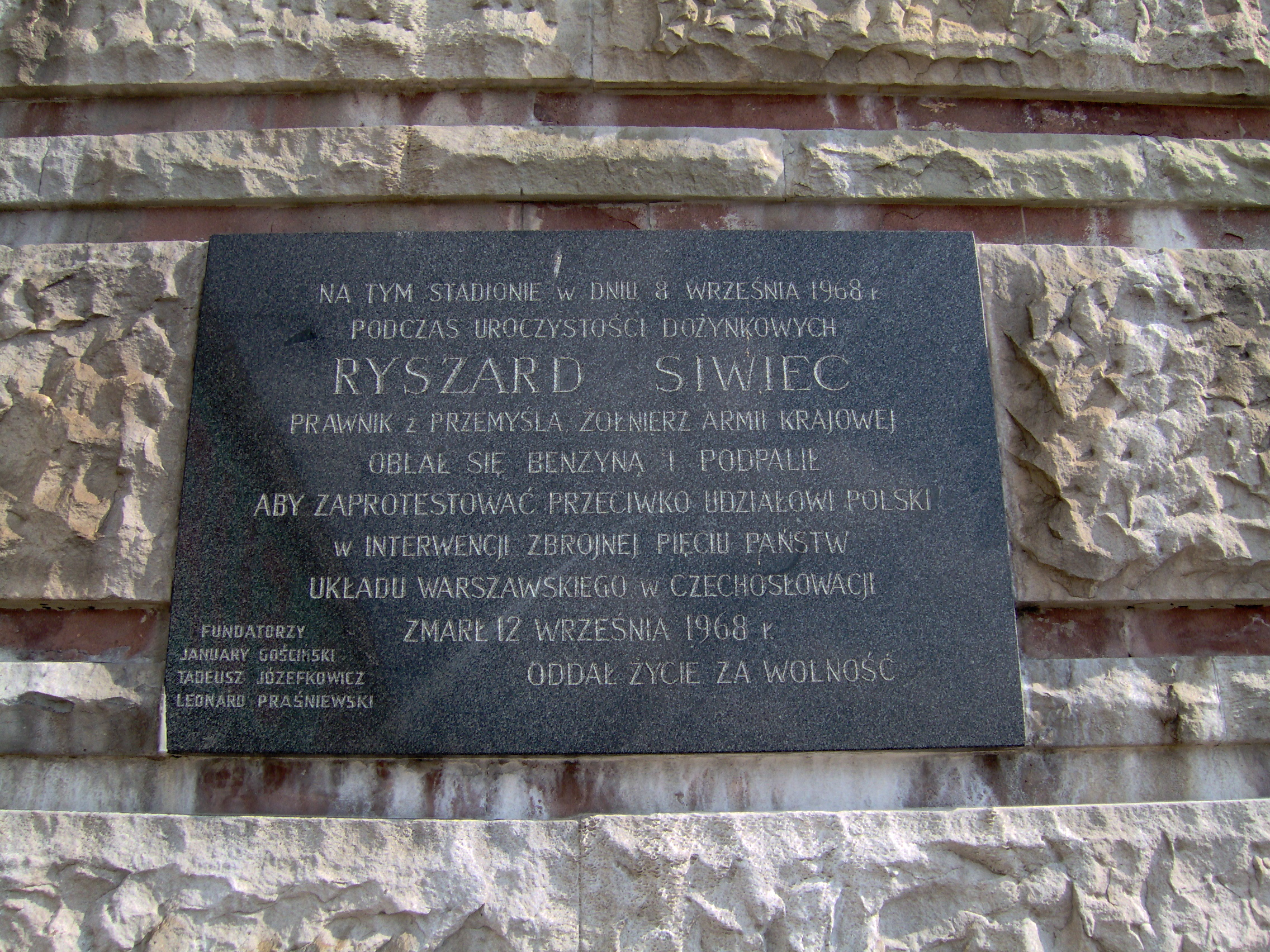
Plaque dedicated to Siwiec at the old 10th-Anniversary Stadium

Through the efforts of his family and friends, information about Siwiec became known to the anti-communist Solidarity opposition in Poland by the 1980s. A brochure about him was published in 1981. After the fall of communism, Siwiec became the subject of the 1991 documentary film Hear My Cry (Usłyszcie mój krzyk), by Polish director Maciej Drygas. The film won several awards including the European Film Awards "Felix" prize for "Best Documentary" that year. Drygas, who is credited with reconstructing and popularizing Siwiec's story, remarked that compared to other similar incidents of that time, such as the self-immolations of Palach or Romas Kalanta, Siwiec death's is unique in how little attention it attracted. Jan Nowak-Jeziorański, the director of the Polish section of Radio Free Europe, expressed a similar sentiment: "This was an unheard of human tragedy... The tragedy lay in that his sacrifice went completely unnoticed." In the same vein, Kavaliauskas interprets Drygas' movie as a critique of contemporary Polish society, saying that witnesses did not want to have this incident spoil their enjoyment of the festival on an otherwise "perfect day".

Memorial plaques dedicated to his memory exist in Warsaw, Dębica and Przemyśl. A bridge in Przemyśl, where he lived, was named after him in 1991, as well as a street in Prague in front of the Czech Institute for the Study of Totalitarian Regimes, with a nearby memorial dedicated to him, unveiled in 2010. A street in Warsaw adjacent to the new Kazimierz Górski National Stadium, which replaced the 10th-Anniversary Stadium, was named for him in 2011, and an obelisk was installed in his memory. Nonetheless, as noted by Kavaliauskas in 2010, he still is less known than other self-immolators of his time.

== Honours ==
Following Drygas' movie, Ryszard Siwiec was awarded the following honours posthumously:

- Order of Tomáš Garrigue Masaryk, first class, awarded in 2001 by Václav Havel, President of the Czech Republic.
- Order of Polonia Restituta, Commander's Cross, awarded in 2003 by Aleksander Kwaśniewski, President of Poland.
- Order of the White Double Cross, 3rd Class, awarded in 2006 by Ivan Gašparovič, President of Slovakia.

== See also ==
- Jan Palach, Czech student's 1969 protest self-immolation in Prague
- Romas Kalanta, Lithuanian student's 1972 protest self-immolation in Kaunas
- Walenty Badylak, documentary film about Badylak's self-immolation in 1980, Krakow on YouTube
- Piotr Szczęsny, political self-immolation in Warsaw, 2017
- Evžen Plocek, political self-immolation in Jihlava, Czechoslovakia, 1969
- Jan Zajíc, Czech student's 1969 self-immolation in Prague, Czechoslovakia
- Vasyl Makukh, 1968 self-immolation in Kyiv in protest against the Soviet rule
- List of political self-immolations
