= Socius =

Socius may refer to:

- Socii, of the Roman Republic in classical times
- a Latin noun meaning "comrade, friend, ally" (adjectival form: socialis) and used to describe a bond or interaction between parties that are friendly, or at least civil; it has given rise to the word "society"
- Socius (insect anatomy), a part of the Lepidoptera genitalia
- Socius (journal), an academic journal published by the American Sociological Association
- Socius (philosophy), a philosophical concept developed by Gilles Deleuze
- the secretary and chief of staff of a provincial superior of the Jesuits
