= Gender policing =

Enforcement of normative gender expressions

Gender policing is the imposition or enforcement of normative gender expressions. Gender policing primarily affects transgender and gender-nonconforming individuals. According to Judith Butler, rejection of individuals who are non-normatively gendered is a component of creating one's own gender identity.

It is common for normative gender performances of gender to be encouraged and rewarded, while non-normative performances are discouraged through punishment or generally negative reactions. Policing of non-normative performances ranges in intensity from relatively minor discouraging comments to brutal acts of violence. Tactics of gender policing also vary widely, depending in part on the perceived gender of the individual target.

Gender policing is little-explored at the international level. In the United States, there are ethnographic studies of gender policing in the context of school bullying, but its role in the family relationship remains poorly studied.

== Heteronormativity, cisnormativity and the gender binary ==
Gender policing aims to keep gender roles rigid and aligned according to the gender binary. Gender binary is the concept that gender can exist only in the forms of man or woman. Heteronormativity is an extension of this belief that posits that heterosexuality is the preferred or normal sexual orientation. This functionalism of biology rises from the idea that male and female genitalia only serve the purpose of procreation, giving sexuality a specific biological purpose within society.

Gayle Rubin's writing in "The Traffic in Women" links the creation of the gender binary to the subordination of women in western society. Rubin studied the works of Karl Marx, Sigmund Freud, and Claude Lévi-Strauss to gain a better understanding of the creation of the "sex/gender system". Rubin found that "woman" was a role created in opposition to "man" and served the purpose of building power, trade relationships, and mutual aid through the exchange of women by marriage. These Kinship systems necessitated rules, which had to be policed to ensure their continued survival. These rules crystallized into heteronormativity, culturally instilling the rules for accepted sexuality in western society.

The gender binary in western society was formalized from the interpretations of men and women during the hunter-gatherer ages. During this Mesolithic or Middle Stone Age in North-West Europe, hunting and gathering food was a prominent survival strategy. Early interpretations of these survival techniques is one of the main reasons for the current idea of the gender binary within western society. In his review of the ethnography of gathering shellfish, Clive Bonsall incorrectly presumed that women and children were primarily gatherers and men were the hunters due to their stronger skill set. These assumptions of past societies shaped the current structure of western society into the beliefs that men are the providers and women are the supporters. Additionally in the idea of heterosexual marriage as the societal norm came from the analysis of the interactions between different Mesolithic populations.

Another mentality that strengthens the idea of binary gender within western society is the warrior-breeder relationship. In this mentality, masculinity is characterized by the traits of the model warrior: strong and fearless, yet disposable. Meanwhile, femininity and womanhood revolve around reproduction. In this relationship, there are only two types of people; therefore, two genders. This dichotomy is valued because it keeps society safe in times of war. The warriors fight and protect while the breeders replace the fallen warriors.

From the works of LGBTQ activism groups during the late 1980s to 1990s, Queer theory was created along with the influential work of Michel Foucault and Eve Kosofsky Sedgwick. Queer theory creates a space outside the gender binary. This theory deconstructs and discredits the idea of a gender binary. Disregarding the gender binary caused fears within the western society, ultimately leading to gender policing in order to maintain the idea of binary gender.

Man and woman as categories can not exist without the other to enforce what they are and are not. The same can be said of heterosexuality and homosexuality. These categories are created out of their opposition, forming power dynamics. Michel Foucault referred to this creation of identities, through creating discourse surrounding the ideal, as reverse discourse. This antagonistic relationship between identities is the basis for gender policing. Deviation from normative expression, of either gender or sexuality, is often met with varying degrees of violence.

Gender policing also serves to reinforce cisnormativity. Aspects of the enforcement of cisnormativity through gender policing are under-researched internationally, as research focusing on cisgender queer people has long ignored the experiences of transgender youth.

== Patriarchy and hegemonic masculinity ==
Patriarchal societies perpetuate masculine dominance in all aspects of life. Patriarchy privileges masculine thought and expression creating a gender hierarchy where women and the feminine are subordinated. The concept of hegemonic masculinity describes a hierarchy even within masculinity itself. Hegemonic masculinity allows for the terms and expression of masculinity to be renegotiated according to time, culture, and class status, allowing for the rationalization of its continued dominance.

Sociologist Raewyn Connell created the theory of hegemonic masculinity in order to explain the relationships between men and women and between the class of men within a patriarchal system. This theory is based on Antonio Gramsci's concept of hegemony––conformity or subordination of one group which creates class-based domination. Connell's theory explains the ways in which ideal or normalized masculine traits have the highest values in western society. These masculine attributes include wealth, control over resources, fertility, attractiveness, heterosexuality, physical strength, and emotional detachment. Demetrakis Z. Demetriou further divided hegemonic masculinity into two types: external and internal. External hegemonic masculinity refers to the subordination of women under men. Internal hegemonic masculinity is the spectrum of masculinity seen within men. This spectrum is defined by the amount of power and masculinity a man holds. The patriarchy needs hegemonic masculinity in order to maintain power. In order to keep this power, men must be policed and women must be dominated. Since the ideal form of masculinity is seen by patriarchal power, men that fit in this norm are seen as what a human should embody.

The gender hierarchy created by patriarchy and hegemonic masculinity creates competition for dominance resulting in the policing of gender and sexuality. Policing of masculinity in a heteronormative society reinforces the gender binary. Individuals seeking to reaffirm their position in a masculine hierarchy seek out and police individuals performing inadequately. Sexual minority men are more likely to be identified as gender nonconforming than heterosexual men and may be more vulnerable to societal messages intended to pressure men to behave in ways that are traditionally masculine. Those performing inadequately must either conform to the accepted forms of gender and sexual expression or risk violence and ostracism.

Fathers are more likely than mothers to enforce gender boundaries, or police the gendered expressions of their children. Second, both fathers and mothers enforce gender boundaries more frequently with sons than with daughters. Research on the topic of parental gender policing has shown that female children who display traditionally masculine traits or behaviors receive more social and parental acceptance than male children who exhibit traditionally feminine tendencies. Many scholars on the subject argue that this is due to the greater value assigned to "masculine" traits or behaviors compared to "feminine" ones, and/or beliefs that "tomboyism" is temporary. At least one study indicates that parents across various social locations celebrate and encourage their preschool age daughters to engage in gender nonconformity, such as wearing sports-themed clothing and participating in traditionally male activities. However, other research indicates that in part due to peer and parental pressures, "tomboys", or female children with "masculine" traits or behavioral tendencies, frequently either abandon these tendencies in adolescence, or adopt a more feminine performance but retain many masculine skills and traits. Pressures to conform to gender norms increase with age, and often manifest in these children being "instructed or shamed to conform to traditional femininity – in dress, appearance, posture, manner, interests, and dating."

== Femmephobia ==
According to R. A. Hoskin, femmephobia, a type of discrimination and oppression towards people with feminine gender expression, often functions as gender policing. Femmephobia lays down narrow rules for women of an "ideal femininity", which in any case, however, will be seen as inferior to masculinity.

== Psychoanalysis ==
Fields of knowledge that claim to be universal are still created within societal frameworks that have their own rules and biases. A patriarchal society gives privilege to masculine thought and excludes other points of view and histories. All discourse created in a patriarchal society can be said to acquiesce to hegemonic masculinity.

Michel Foucault viewed psychoanalysis as a secular confession concerned with finding our natural sexual selves. The problem, Foucault argued, is that sexuality is cultural and any narrative created around it gives the subject the illusion of identity rather than experience. Psychoanalysis conducted in a hetero-normative society would view any deviation as a failing to achieve that ideal. Rather than someone being seen as performing an act, they would be seen as embodying that which society deemed inadequate.

Gayle Rubin wrote about Sigmund Freud's psychoanalytic theory in "The Traffic In Women". Rubin states that Jacques Lacan's analysis of Freud views the Oedipus complex as the crisis experienced by a child when internalizing kinship rules. The child becomes aware of the sex/gender system and organizes itself accordingly. Neurosis is seen as having an understanding of this system yet failing to adapt to it. Lacan's separation of the Phallus from the physical penis elucidates societies privileging of the masculine and gender's separation from biology. In Rubin's view psychiatry further policed accepted gender and sexual expression by deeming non normative behavior as mentally and emotionally stunted. Rubin also saw that this system of internalizing norms privileged heterosexual masculinity while outlining the psychic oppression society inflicts on women and femininity.

== Intersectionality ==
Gender policing affects different social identifications in different ways. Along with gender, characteristic attributes such as race, gender identity, class, sexual orientation, age, religion, creed, and disability interact with each other and are affected differently by gender policing. The effect of intersection of these social categories are studied in intersectionality theory. Understanding intersectionality within gender policing can be done by tracing back and analyzing the relation between race and gender in history. Race and gender over time produced hierarchies within themselves. Similar to the way the classification of "man" cannot exist without "woman", "white" people cannot exist without "black" people. Race as a classification arose from European capitalist colonialism. European colonists deemed those who weren't "white", primitive and deserving of domination and "civilizing". Global colonialism by European capitalists imposed European ways of knowing and being on the peoples they colonized. This included a racialized and patriarchal conception of gender. The view of colonized peoples as primitive created a distinction between "white" (human) and "black" (property or inhuman). The view of "black" as other than human excluded "black" people from classifications of gender. In western society, being "white" and middle class continue to inform gender norms, leaving "non-white" people unable to perform accepted femininity or masculinity.

In modern-day times, intersectionality now touches upon various other forms of human characterizations, affecting people in countless different ways. How a white transgender woman may experience gender policing is going to differ greatly from how an Asian heterosexual woman might (etc.).

In the US, Black girls disproportionately face racist and sexist dress codes, which are racialized gender policing.

== Socialization ==
An individual's expression of gender is often first policed by their parent(s), as well as other elder authorities such as teachers and day care providers, at a very young age. Gender policing is part of the process of "gendering" children, or socializing them in a way considered conventionally appropriate to their assigned sex. Once children are taught gender norms and experience their enforcement, they are likely to begin policing others – both their peers and their elders.

=== Gender policing in social contexts ===
Gender policing occurs across multiple social environments (schools, families, and workplaces). In school settings, groups play a role in enforcing gender norms, often through teasing, bullying, or social exclusion.

Ethnographic research has shown that adolescents may use language and behavior to reinforce expectations of masculinity and femininity.

Within families, parents and caregivers often shape early gender expression by encouraging behaviors aligned with traditional norms and discouraging deviation.

In workplace environments, gender policing may occur through expectations regarding appearance, communication styles, and professional conduct. People who do not align to these expectations may face discrimination or might face reduced opportunities. Research on workplace communication shows that expectations about how people "should" speak are often shaped by gender. Women are more often expected to use a softer, more relationship-focused and deferential communication style, while men are generally expected to be more direct, assertive, and authoritative.

=== Early childhood ===
Gender policing begins with gender enforcing from parents teaching their children what is "masculine" and what is "feminine" in the traditional sense of these terms. These traditional ideas of gender are reinforced through practices such as referring to children as "boys" and "girls" which "makes sex/ gender the central component of how kids think of themselves, understand their social group, and view themselves through their parents' eyes." As Jane Ward, professor of Gender and Sexuality Studies at University of California, Riverside, writes in her chapter of the book Chasing Rainbows: Exploring Gender Fluid Parenting Practices, even parents who hope to redefine "boyhood" or "girlhood" (such as through allowing a "tomboy" daughter, or dressing a son in dresses, for example), still reinforce the concept of gender as a binary which is biologically determined. The gender binary is already enforced in obvious places, such as in the segregation of toys in stores, for example.

Ethnographic research in preschools has also contributed to the body of knowledge related to gender policing. This research has suggested that teachers give their students gendered instructions about what to do with their bodies. Across several schools, teachers gave boys explicit bodily instructions more frequently than girls, indicating that boys' bodies are policed more often than girls'. However, this may be because teachers were more forceful with their instructions to girls, who were also usually quicker to follow instructions, thus teachers did not need to repeat themselves as often. Teachers were also more likely to direct boys to cease behaviors (e.g. running, throwing objects), whereas they were more apt to instruct girls to alter them. For example, girls were given directive bodily instructions such as "talk to her, don't yell, sit here, pick that up, be careful, be gentle, give it to me, put it down there." As a result, a wider range of potential activities is available to boys than girls, because although they are dissuaded from some, they are not directed to engage in specific activities as often as girls are. According to Martin, the scholar and sociologist who conducted this research, "Gendering of the body in childhood is the foundation on which further gendering of the body occurs throughout the life course. The gendering of children's bodies makes gender differences feel and appear natural, which allows for such bodily differences to emerge throughout the life course."

Relatively recent efforts have been made to limit gender policing, particularly in childhood. Sweden's reformation of their school system in 1962 resulted in a new curriculum which included objectives to limit gender policing in early education. Within this new curriculum it was determined that "Pre-schools should work to counteract traditional gender and gender roles. Girls and boys in pre-schools should have the same opportunities to try and develop their abilities and interests without being limited by stereotyped gender roles." These preschools, elementary, and secondary schools aim to reduce the gender policing placed onto children, but through doing this must show how teachers and other pedagogical adults may accidentally reinforce gender stereotypes. Tools teachers use to combat this include practices such as keeping journals and videotaping classroom interactions (a practice proposed by Susanne Rithander). A general pedagogical practice in these Swedish schools in called compensatory pedagogy, which plays off the idea that, per traditional gender roles, boys are encouraged to maintain autonomy while girls are encouraged to maintain closeness with others. Compensatory pedagogy challenges these traditional gender roles by encouraging girls to maintain autonomy and boys to build closeness with others.

Some parents have attempted to limit gender policing through their parenting styles, as is the case with Storm's parents, who chose not to gender their child but instead to wait until their child could decide for themself. Unlike the relative success so far of Swedish schools in limiting gender policing, individual efforts by Kathy and David, Storm's parents, faced huge media backlash. In the chapter titled Get Your Gender Binary Off My Childhood!: Towards a Movement for Childrenʹs Gender Self-Determination, Ward shows how Storm's parents were often called deceitful and manipulative, as Ward puts it, "For not revealing what they knew about Storm's genitals, Kathy and David were accused of hiding Storm's very selfhood."

As a feminist legal scholar Mary Ann Case pointed out in the notes to her article Disaggregating Gender from Sex and Sexual Orientation: The Effeminate Man in the Law and Feminist Jurisprudence (1995), in Russia, the policing of the gender behavior of young children is much stricter than in the United States. Girls, even in preschool years, are universally taught to wear large bows and gold earrings and to be shy.

=== Adolescence ===
Adolescence is a developmental stage in which peer groups are especially important, and peer relationships take primacy over familial relationships. It is also a stage during which gender policing amongst peers becomes increasingly common. Adolescents have already been introduced, during childhood, to normative gender expressions and social expectations therein by elders. These expectations are then reinforced during adolescence, largely by peers gender policing one another. In this (and every) stage of development, gender policing is especially prevalent in explicitly gendered environments, such as bathrooms, locker rooms, and sports teams.

Dude, You're a Fag, a book by C. J. Pascoe, examines masculinity and gender policing in high schools through ethnographic research. Pascoe largely focuses on high school boys' use of the fag epithet to establish their own masculinity by questioning or challenging others'. In this context, the use of the fag epithet is a form of gender policing, frequently applied to boys who lack heterosexual prowess or are deemed inadequately masculine or strong. According to Pascoe, "[the fag identity] is fluid enough that boys police their behaviors out of fear of having the fag identity permanently adhere and definitive enough so that boys recognize a fag behavior and strive to avoid it".

A study of male students of a co-educational, Catholic high school demonstrates insights from adolescent males themselves in regard to gender policing. This study highlights the gender policing of males by each other through exploring the types of bullying being practiced. Forms of bullying (and gender policing) come from accusations of males being homosexual. One participant in the study explains that he was bullied for dancing ballet and described his bullying as "Just a lot to do with being a woman", thus showing an association of specific activities with a specific gender (and that deviance from typical gender roles proves a perceived grounds for bullying). Through the practice of conducting interviews, the study briefly explores an observed policing of male behavior by females. One interviewee "appears to be drawing attention to the different norms for governing the conduct of girls who police boys' bullying practices through a condemnation of violent behaviors". Interviewees also draw attention to the confirmation and reinforcement of attitudes and practices considered "masculine" within males. In addition, these "masculine" identifiers are further enforced through female interaction and confirmation. In conducting these interviews, it is also found how adolescents view the stereotypical concept of masculinity as a concept which is ingrained early on in their lives and "passed on from their fathers".

Intersectionality also plays a role in understanding the policing of gender during the socialization process for adolescence. It has been noted that the controlling images of Black women are often applied to young Black girls, and they are punished and policed accordingly, such as being punished for their anger in schools. Additionally, there are many ways that a person's intersecting identities affects how they are treated and how their masculinity and feminity is censored and policed.

=== Adulthood ===
During adulthood, gender policing generally becomes more subtle. However, for an individual whose gender is perceived as ambiguous, blatant forms still exist. These range from curious inquiries by children (e.g. "Are you a boy or a girl?") to gender policing in bathrooms (discussed in the following section). People who are gender-normative in appearance experience primarily behavioral gender policing, such as reminders to act in a more (or less) feminine or masculine manner. Men are more often dissuaded and shamed for feminine behavior than women are for masculine behavior. It is theorized that this is due, at least in part, to the higher societal value of masculinity.

Gender policing has been reinforced in adults for many years. As Angela Y. Davis points out, early women's prisons relied on gender policing as a means of reformation. The first women's reformatory in the U.S. opened in Indiana and included areas designed as kitchens, living rooms, and nurseries. The idea was to train women about domesticity through activities such as cooking, sewing, and cleaning.

Sex testing and verification in sports and athletics shows gender policing as a practice still relevant to many countries and athletic organizations in recent history. In the case of the nineteen-year-old Missouri runner Helen Stephens in the 1936 Berlin Olympics, who finished first place in the 100-meter race, many questioned her sex because they could not fathom the concept of a woman running so quickly. Sex testing and verification has existed throughout human history, even being traced back to practices in ancient Greek contests. Within these Greek traditions, women were deterred from participation and even spectatorship at times. In the examples of both Greek practices and the story of Helen Stephens of Missouri, it can be seen how women are often more likely to be subject to sex verification processes and accusations of deceit (i.e. women are often accused of actually being men disguised as women; men are not often accused of being women disguised as men).

Adult people can face gender-policing sex stereotyping on workplace from their employers, for example, to be fired for gender-nonconforming behavior. Gender policing on workplace can be classified as sexual harassment.

Adult people can also face gender policing in abusive relationships.

== Transgender, androgynous, and gender non-conforming individuals ==
The severity of gender policing is often proportional to the extremity of non-normativity. For example, transgender individuals are likely to be victims of the most extreme and violent forms of gender policing. Research regarding conformity pressures and gender resistance among transfeminine individuals (those who are assigned the male sex at birth but identify as a woman) indicates that these persons experienced "intense and pervasive" pressures to conform to traditional masculinity, and feared exposure of their gender identity would result in physical danger or loss of legal, economic, or social standing. Thus, transgender individuals must often choose between self-preservation and expressing their self-identified gender.

Gender policing is especially prevalent in bathrooms due to the increased salience of gender in explicitly gendered environments (and the forced binary of "men" and "women"). While this issue is frequently encountered by transgender and genderqueer individuals, to a lesser extent, it is also experienced by persons with androgynous or gender ambiguous appearances. For individuals with non-normative gender identities, the choice of which bathroom to use is often laden with "anxiety, ambivalence, and anticipated harassment." It is not uncommon for gender-normative people to alert security of the presence of transgender (or androgynous) individuals in a bathroom, regardless of whether the bathroom they are using conforms to their sex or to their gender identity. According to Jack Halberstam, the main distinction between gender policing in the women's room and in the men's room is that in the former, not only trans women, but all gender ambiguous females are scrutinized, whereas in the latter, biological males are less frequently deemed out of place. Further, compared to trans women in the women's room, trans men in the men's room are likely to be less scrutinized because men are less vigilant about intruders than women. However, a trans man in the men's room is more likely to be met with violence if he does not succeed in passing.

Trans women and trans men are "six times more likely to experience discrimination" than non-trans people. Over 2,000 incidents of anti-LGBT hate crimes were reported to the National Coalition of Anti-Violence Programs in 2013. In 2014, there was a national study of trans violence discovered with the results of "53% of respondents reporting verbal assault and 8% physical assault in a place of public accommodation". As a site where gender norms are policed, bathrooms are the most common public accommodation where trans people and gender non-conforming people experience hate violence. People tend to believe that there is a connection between genitals and gender. Therefore, the gender segregation of bathrooms is based on genital configuration. Because of this "match" between genitals and gender, trans people often are labeled as "deceivers" and blamed for the violence. When a trans or androgynous person is questioned in the bathroom, the reaction is "not to reassess the arbitrary nature of segregating bathrooms by sex but to violently eject the trans or gender non-conforming person". Using a public bathroom is no longer a simple matter for trans and gender non-conforming people.

As of March 2017, 19 states (California, Nevada, Hawaii, New York, etc.), the District of Columbia and over 200 cities have enforced the anti-discrimination law toward transgender people allowing them to use any public restroom that corresponds to their gender. Also, most public accommodations changed their restroom signs where there are both genders and the text "Gender Neutral Restroom" or "Inclusive Restroom". This law was passed because of the March 2016 "Bathroom Bill" in North Carolina. The bill argued that banning people from using public restrooms of their choice due to the biological sex listed on their birth certificates (genitals vs. gender) was unreasonable, therefore, it launched transgender rights into the national spotlight.

Researchers S. F. Hall and M. J. DeLaney in the Journal of Homosexuality indicate that in the United States, trans people often face in-group gender policing in LGBT spaces, including from other trans people, as "not trans enough", in case they do not correspond to the settings of the gender binary.

== Fashion and modern opposition to gender policing ==
In 1924, gender norms accepted and reinforced ideologies that shadowed Freud's hegemonic thesis that "biology is the key determinant of gender identity". These norms were imbedded into cultural regularity, affecting gender identity in everyday life, law, and politics. Gender policing strategies enforced these norms, and a prevalent tactic was to use culturally obligatory dress codes as a tool in forcing people into gender binaries. However progressive movements throughout history have worked vigorously to defy policing, combating restrictive norms through disregard and reformation of policed gender standards. Following of Freud's theory has steadily begun to dwindle and new studies are beginning to reveal a popular uprising theory that individuals make their own decisions as to which gender distinctions apply to them. Modern opposition of gender norms are erasing the aged policing of conforming to the standards of one's sex. According to a study by Intelligence Group, a consumer insights company, "More than two-thirds of people ages 14 to 34 agree that gender does not have to define a person in the way that it used to… and 6 in 10 say that men and women do not need to conform to traditional gender roles or behaviors anymore."

=== Gendered clothing laws and ordinances ===
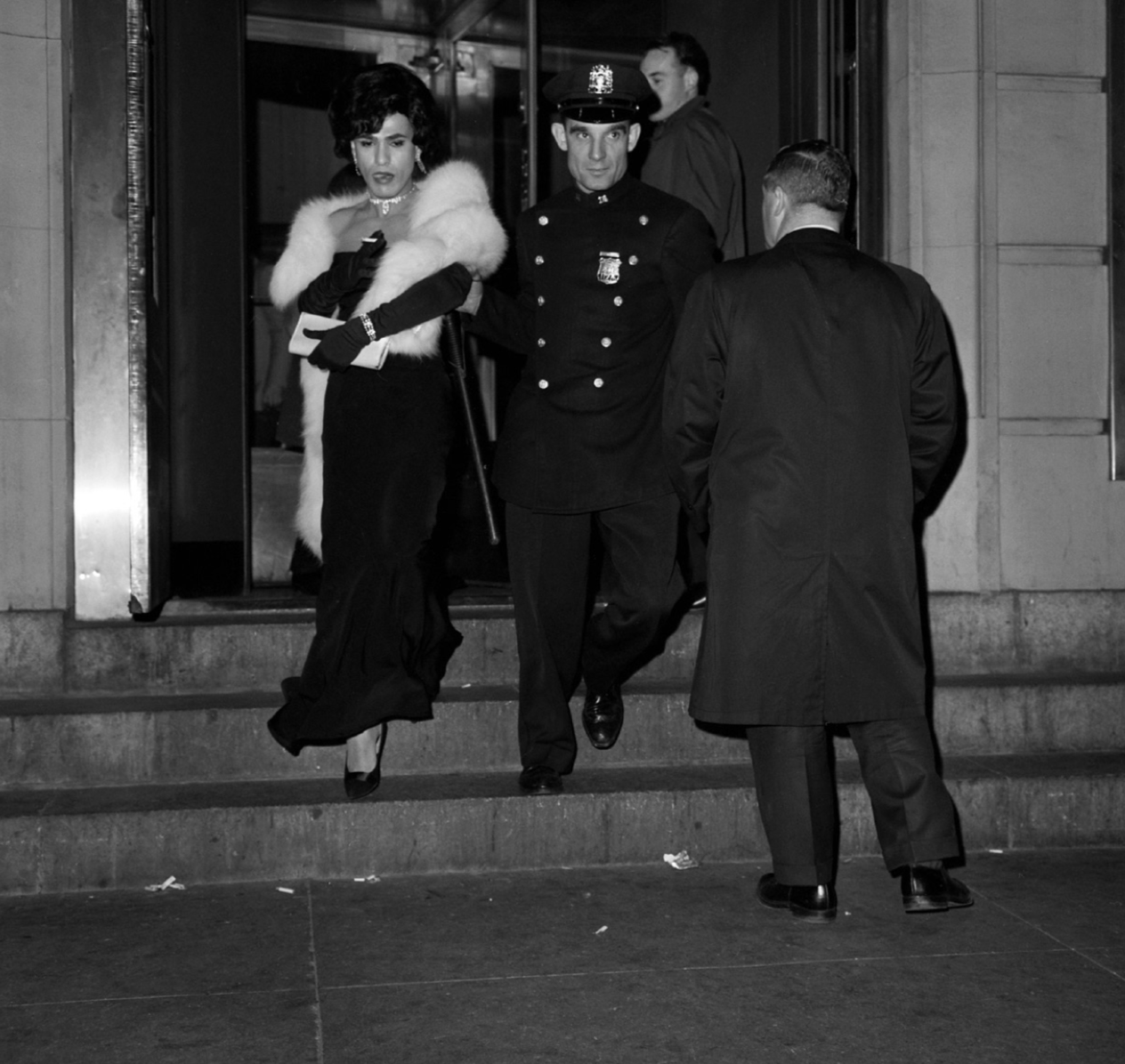
Drag queen arrested under anti-crossdressing laws in New York City, 1962

Older fashion protocols systematically enforced normative gender binaries, confining people to dress and accessorize in a way that connected to their sex. Society would use gender policing tactics to enforce cultural and societal acceptance of a gendered dress code. The earliest gendered clothing ordinance in the United States was enacted in Columbus, Ohio in 1848. The ordinance forbade someone from appearing, "in a dress not belonging to his or her sex." In the 19th century, forty American cities passed anti-drag and anti-crossdressing ordinances. These ordinances often adopted language invoking public indecency, such as St. Louis's 1864 law which stated: "Whoever shall, in this city, appear in any public place in a state of nudity, or in a dress not belonging to his or her sex, or in an indecent or lewd dress... shall be deemed guilty of a misdemeanor." Other ordinances were couched in terms of public safety. An 1845 New York state statute, for example, defined an unlawful vagrant as "[a] person who, having his face painted, discolored, covered, or concealed, or being otherwise disguised, in a manner calculated to prevent his being identified, appears in a road or public highway." Many gendered clothing laws from the early 20th century focused particularly on forbidding people assigned male at birth from dressing in women's clothing. Such sex-specific laws were passed in Detroit, Michigan in 1944, in Denver, Colorado in 1954, and in Miami, Florida in 1965.

In the latter half of the 20th century, some crossdressing laws were challenged on the basis of their ambiguity and difficulty of enforcement. The Supreme Court of Ohio saw the 1975 case Columbus v Rogers, which challenged and overturned the city's ordinance. Ohio Supreme Court Justice O'Neill wrote that the ordinance was, "unconstitutionally void for vagueness, because it does not provide adequate standards by which activity can be determined as legal or illegal." He clarified later in his opinion, "Modes of dress for both men and women are historically subject to changes in fashion. At the present time, clothing is sold for both sexes which is so similar in appearance that a person of ordinary intelligence might not be able to identify it as male or female dress."

=== Using fashion in modern opposition ===
This reformation campaign against gender policed conformity has found a focus in developing cultural acceptance for fluidity in modern cultural dress codes. Nowadays decisions on gender identity are seen as self made and a form of "self expression". A prevalent way of expressing one's identity and not conforming to gender norms is through personal choice in style. These choices include apparel, accessories, and beauty habits. Style has a "symbolic meaning" of self expression, "giving us a means to cultivate our own visions of the culture we experience around us". Therefore, fashion nonconformity has become embraced by a number of millennials who believe in bending past policed gendered binaries. They do this by ignoring the dress codes that were previously used to confine someone to their gender. In disregarding a dress code that has been used as a weapon in enforcing gender binary, these millennials have found a powerful opposition to gender policing.

Modern gender-specific fashion has become more flexible to personal preference, becoming visibly more directed against old gendered style constraints. The refusal to conform to the rules of outdated fashion protocol is being embraced by a la mode fashion and mainstream style. A recent pattern in clothing and accessories that transcend gender style norms has become steadily vogue and evidently pioneering fashion trends have increasingly grown accepting to the fusion of normally gender specific style details. Trendy nonconforming styles empower women to dress in an inclusively "masculine" manner and enable men to adapt "feminine" attributes in their style, for example women choosing to wear suits to work, or men wearing nail polish, etc.

== Health ==
Gender policing of boys can increase the risk of alcohol use, anxiety, and depression.

== Consequences ==
Gender policing has been linked to a range of negative psychological and social outcomes. People who are faced with frequent enforcement of gender norms may experience increased stress, anxiety, and reduced self-esteem.

The minority stress model explains that chronic exposure to stigma and social regulation contributes to bad mental health outcomes among gender and sexual minorities.

For transgender and gender diverse people, gender policing can contribute to persistent stress due to ongoing experiences of invalidation and discrimination.

== Interventions ==
Efforts to reduce gender policing often focus on educational, social, and policy based approaches. Inclusive educational practices, for example anti-bullying programs have been shown to reduce the rigid gender norms among children and adolescents.

Parenting approaches that support diverse forms of gender expression may also decrease early experiences of gender policing. At a broader level, legal protections and institutional policies aimed at reducing discrimination can contribute to more inclusive environments.

These interventions emphasize the importance of challenging normative assumptions about gender and promoting acceptance of diverse identities.

== See also ==
- Anti-gender movement
- Childhood gender nonconformity
- Convention on the Elimination of All Forms of Discrimination against Women
- Eleno de Céspedes
- Gender representation in video games
- Machismo
- Masculism
- Sex and gender distinction
- Sociology of gender
- Western stereotype of the male ballet dancer
