= David Buckel =

American LGBT rights lawyer and environmental activist (1957–2018)

- Born: June 13, 1957; Batavia, New York, U.S.
- Died: April 14, 2018 (aged 60); Prospect Park, Brooklyn, New York, U.S.
- Cause of death: Suicide by self-immolation
- Education: Batavia High School; University of Rochester; Cornell Law School
- Occupation: Lawyer
- Known for: LGBT legal work Environmental activism
- Spouse: Terry Kaelber
- Children: 1

David Stroh Buckel (June 13, 1957 – April 14, 2018) was an American LGBT rights lawyer who worked with Lambda Legal on a number of their notable cases. He was also an environmental activist, focusing on composting. He died on April 14, 2018, by self-immolation as a protest against the use of fossil fuels.

== Early life and education ==
David Buckel was born in Batavia, New York on June 13, 1957, to an agricultural consultant father and a florist mother. He had four brothers. He attended Batavia High School, where he was very active; he played tennis, ran track and field, and was on the cross country team. He was voted the Senior superlative "Most likely to succeed" and was a member of National Honor Society. He graduated in 1975. He then attended the University of Rochester, graduating with a bachelor's degree in 1980, after which he worked as a home health attendant with hospice patients. In 1987, he graduated from Cornell Law School.

== Legal work and environmental activism ==
Buckel was a senior counsel and marriage project director at Lambda Legal, the American organization that focuses on lesbian, gay, bisexual, and transgender (LGBT) communities. In 1996, Buckel represented Jamie Nabozny in Nabozny v. Podlesny, a case heard in the United States Court of Appeals for the Seventh Circuit regarding the protection Nabozny did not receive while at school. Buckel represented Nabozny in his claims stemming from "consistent and significant anti-gay bullying and abuse." In the late 1990s, Buckel was also a lead attorney on James Dale's case challenging the anti-gay policy of the Boy Scouts of America. In 1999, he helped to secure a unanimous victory before the New Jersey Supreme Court and when the case Boy Scouts of America v. Dale went before the US Supreme Court. Buckel coordinated an extensive coalition of amici, including the American Civil Liberties Union, the NAACP, the Anti-Defamation League, and the Mexican American Legal Defense and Educational Fund.

In 2000, Buckel was the lead lawyer for the estate of Brandon Teena, a transgender man who was raped and murdered in Nebraska, when Teena's family recovered damages against negligent law enforcement officers. Buckel stated, "It's a very important case, not only within Nebraska but nationally." The story inspired the 1999 biographical film Boys Don't Cry. In 2006, Buckel argued before the Supreme Court of New Jersey in Lewis v. Harris that "for the government to use the label 'civil union' is a considered choice of language that assigns us a second-class status."

At the time of his death, Buckel was senior organics recovery coordinator with the NYC Compost Project. He was also a volunteer coordinator of Added Value Red Hook Community Farm, where he practiced composting. Buckel's Red Hook composting site became one of the largest in the United States that did not use fossil fuels via machinery. Work at the site was predominantly done by hand. He was nominated for a Solid Waste Association of North America Unsung Hero Award for his work in composting and for the environment. Buckel wrote Guidelines for Urban Community Composting, a guide for composting in urban areas.

== Personal life ==
After his mother's death, Buckel changed his middle name to Stroh, his mother's maiden name. Buckel and his future husband, Terry Kaelber, met in the 1980s. Kaelber is an LGBT activist and would go on to head the Services & Advocacy for GLBT Elders, commonly known as SAGE. Both had an interest in Buddhism and practiced vegetarianism.

Buckel and Kaelber raised a daughter, Hannah Broholm-Vail, who was college-aged at the time of Buckel's death. They co-parented Hannah with Rona Vail and Cindy Broholm, a lesbian couple.

== Death ==
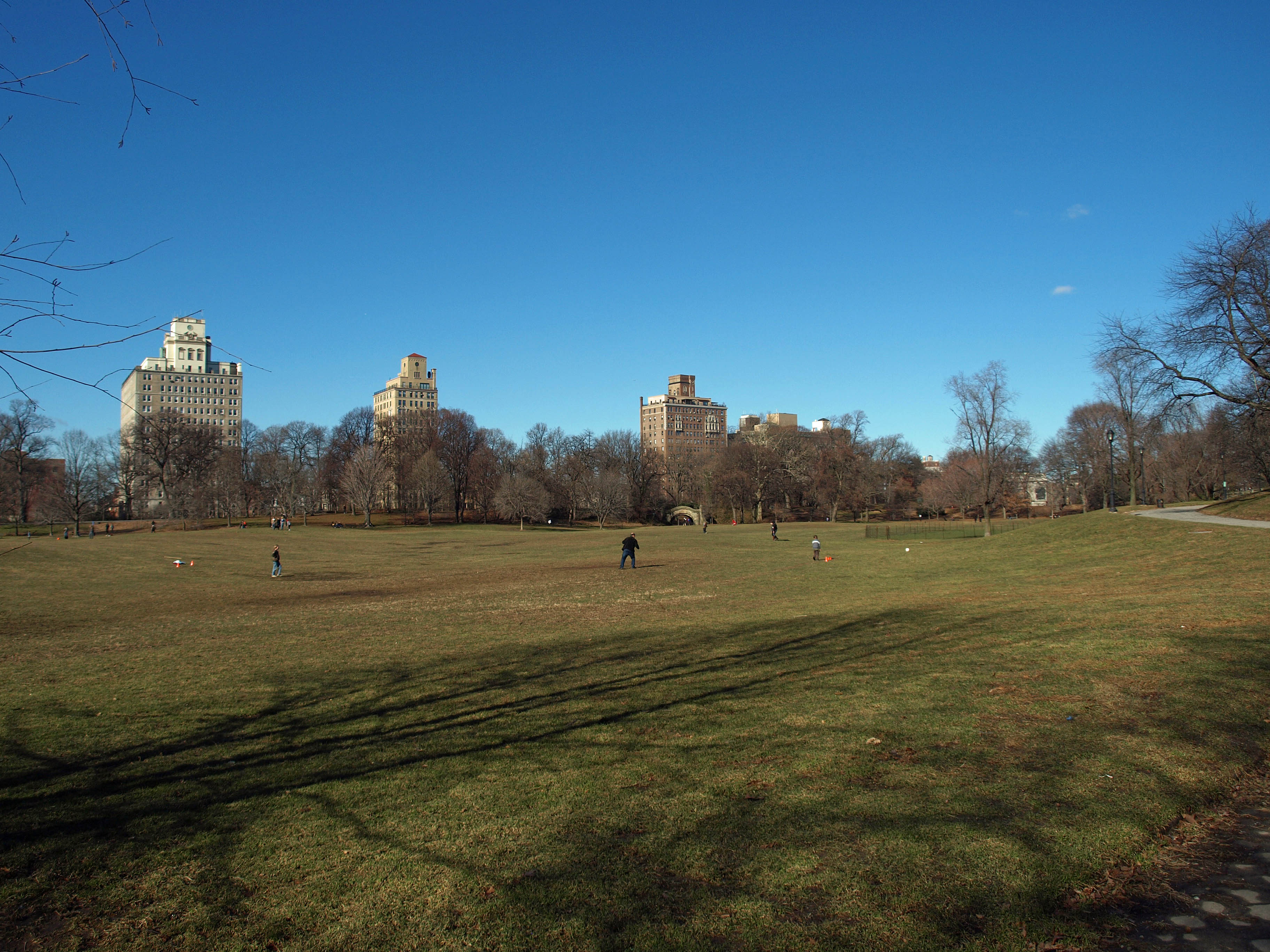
Prospect Park, photographed in 2010, where Buckel died by self-immolation

At around 6 a.m. on April 14, 2018, Buckel set himself on fire at Prospect Park, near his home in Brooklyn. Emergency services were called by an eyewitness at 6:08 a.m., and he was pronounced dead at the scene shortly thereafter. Several minutes prior, at 5:55 a.m., he had emailed a suicide note to multiple news media outlets, in which he wrote, "Most humans on the planet now breathe air made unhealthy by fossil fuels, and many die early deaths as a result—my early death by fossil fuel reflects what we are doing to ourselves."

Buckel left a lanyard bearing his identification nearby, along with a shopping cart carrying a plastic bag typically used to haul soil, which was labeled "for the police" and contained his business card, a copy of his suicide note, and a note in which he apologized "for the mess." As the earth around Buckel was burned in a nearly perfect circle, The New York Times speculated that he had made a ring of soil to prevent the fire from spreading.

Buckel's family and friends later said that in the time prior to his death, he had grown increasingly distraught at the politics surrounding climate change in the United States, particularly the environmental policy of the Trump administration, and had experienced further distress after sustaining a back injury that limited his workload. Two weeks before his suicide, he had begun sending a fellow volunteer at the Red Hook Community Farm information on "how to complete paperwork, annual reports and other documents that would need to be turned over to city agencies" as well as labeling various fixtures and equipment at the facility, but had denied that he was planning on retiring when asked.

=== Legacy ===
Fox News called Buckel "a pioneering lawyer for gay and transgender rights." In a statement to the Huffington Post, Camilla Taylor, senior staff attorney for Lambda Legal, stated, "His thoughtful and engaging advocacy broke through many stubborn misconceptions and showed it was possible and necessary for our movement to speak up for bullied, ostracized LGBT young people." Susan Sommer, a former attorney for Lambda Legal, called Buckel "one of the architects of the freedom to marry and marriage equality movement." The Independent called Buckel "a renowned lawyer turned environmentalist and expert composter."

Kaelber donated a small grove of trees to Buckel's memory in Prospect Park through their Prospect Park Alliance Tree Registry program. The grove was composed of one of each of three types of dogwoods (Kousa, Venus, and Florida Cultivar); two Stewardia; and three sweetgum trees.

==== Comparisons to future self-immolations ====
Four years after Buckel's death, on April 22, 2022, Wynn Bruce also died in an act of self-immolation while protesting climate change, this time at the United States Supreme Court Building in Washington D.C. Buckel's and Bruce's deaths were compared to each other in the media.

In February 2024, Aaron Bushnell died as a result of self-immolation protesting the United States' policies on supporting Israel during the Gaza-Israel conflict. Buckel's self-immolation and the ensuing online discussion was compared to Bushnell's self-immolation and the reasons behind each.

== Publications ==
- Logue, P. M.; Buckel, D. S. (1996). "Fighting Anti-Gay Abuse in Schools: The Opening Appellate Brief of Plaintiff Jamie Nabozny in Nabozny v. Podlesny". Michigan Journal of Gender & Law. 4: 425.
- Buckel, David S. (July 26, 2016). "Legal Perspective on Ensuring a Safe and Nondiscriminatory School Environment for Lesbian, Gay, Bisexual, and Transgendered Students". Education and Urban Society. 32 (3): 390–398. doi:10.1177/0013124500323007. S2CID 143645877.
- Buckel, D. S. (2005). "Same-Sex Couples: Defining Marriage in the Twenty-First Century: Government Affixes a Label of Inferiority on Same-Sex Couples When It Imposes Civil Unions & Denies Access to Marriage". Stanford Law & Policy Review. 16. Stanford Law School: 73.
- Buckel, D. S. (2006). "Lewis v. Harris: Essay on a Settled Question and an Open Question". Rutgers Law Review. 59 (2). Rutgers Law School: 221.

== See also ==
- List of political self-immolations
