= Self-immolation of Wynn Bruce =

2022 suicide of climate activist in Washington, D.C., U.S.

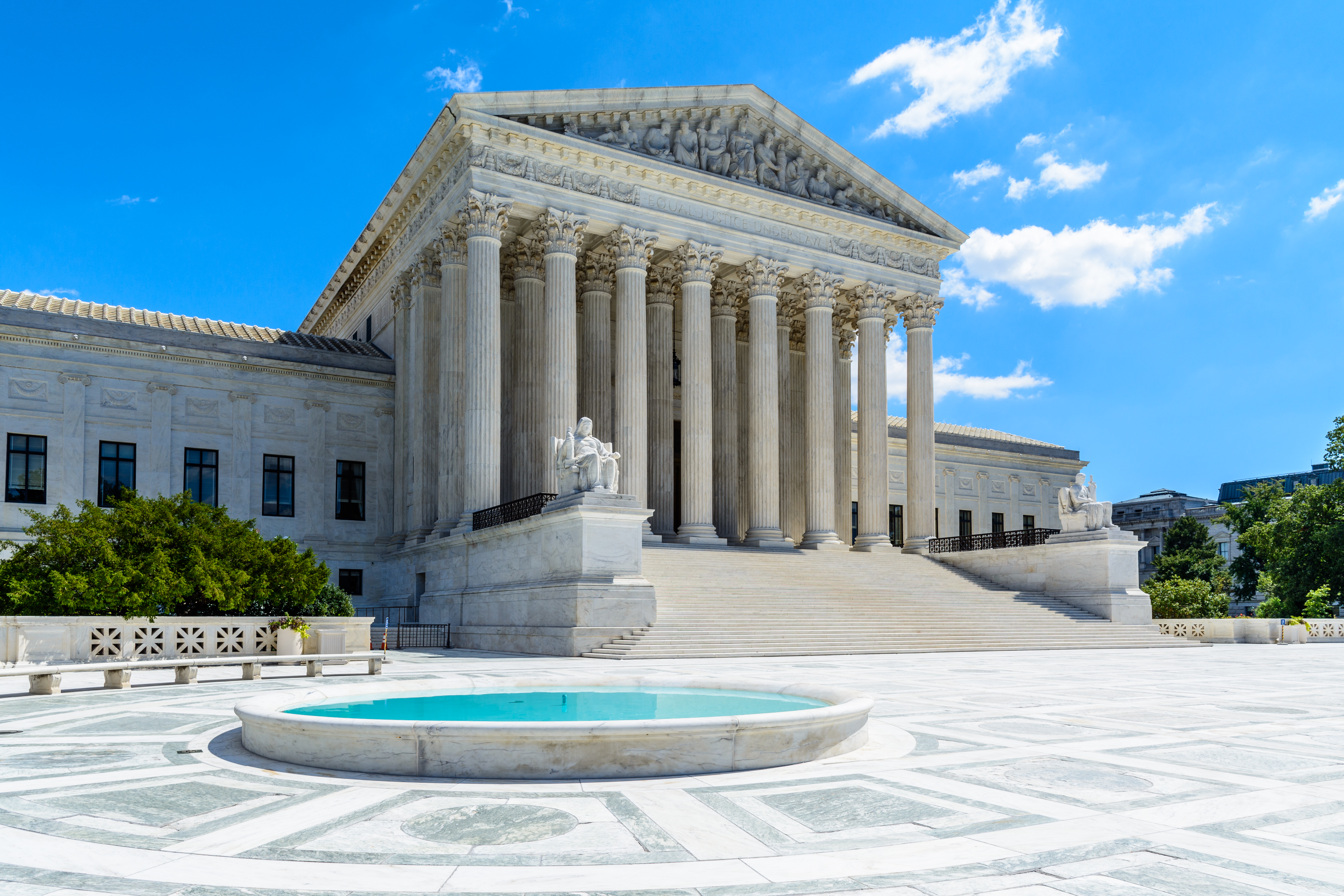
- The U.S. Supreme Court Building, where the self-immolation occurred
- Date: April 22, 2022
- Location: U.S. Supreme Court Building plaza in Washington, D.C., U.S.
- Type: Self-immolation
- Motive: Protest of the climate crisis
- Deaths: Wynn Bruce

On April 22, 2022, climate activist Wynn Alan Bruce set himself on fire in the plaza of the United States Supreme Court Building in Washington, D.C. The fatal self-immolation, which took place on Earth Day, was characterized by Bruce's friends and his father as a protest against the climate crisis.

== Wynn Bruce ==
Wynn Bruce
- Born: Wynn Alan Bruce; August 25, 1971; Green Bay, Wisconsin, U.S.
- Died: April 23, 2022 (aged 50); Washington, D.C., U.S.
- Cause of death: Self-immolation
- Education: Front Range Community College; Community College of Denver
- Occupations: Photographer, climate activist

Wynn Alan Bruce was a climate activist from Boulder, Colorado. He grew up in Minnesota, where he participated in varsity cross country running. In the late 1980s, he moved to Florida to live with his mother, attending Hernando High School where he was a member of the science club. He graduated high school in 1989 and planned to join the US Air Force, but an accident in a car driven by one of his friends killed the friend and severely injured Bruce; he suffered a traumatic brain injury as well as damage to one of his legs. According to some of Bruce's friends and neighbors, he often had difficulty making decisions as a result of his traumatic brain injury; two described him to The Independent as "suggestible". He moved to Boulder in the year 2000, and became interested in photojournalism.

Bruce lived alone in Boulder, in a townhouse that was part of the city's affordable housing program. He had a cat. He was a Buddhist, and while living in Boulder he practiced Shambhala Buddhism. For some time he was a member of the Unitarian Universalist Church of Boulder, which hosted his memorial service. He was a photojournalist who ran a portrait photography studio, an active member of Boulder's contact improvisational dance community, and a graduate of Front Range Community College and Community College of Denver. He was additionally a climate activist. According to his father, Douglas Bruce, "concern about the environment and climate issues" was "really heartfelt and central" to Wynn Bruce's identity; it had been a lifelong commitment that began with childhood trips to a family cabin at Lake Superior.

== Background ==
=== Previous self-immolation attempt ===
Bruce's father Douglas Bruce told The Washington Post that his son had made a previous attempt at self-immolation in 2017 at the World Trade Center, and was stopped by bystanders. Douglas Bruce stated that his son was hospitalized in New York after the incident, that he accompanied Bruce back to Boulder to seek psychological support, and that he never learned why his son had attempted to kill himself.

=== Climate-related developments ===
Bruce's self-immolation came after various negative reports about the climate. A working group within the Intergovernmental Panel on Climate Change had recently released its Climate Change 2022: Mitigation of Climate Change report as part of the IPCC Sixth Assessment Report, stating that action to reduce the most extreme effects of climate change would need to happen "now or never" and leading António Guterres to criticize "a litany of broken climate promises" by world leaders. Climate-related natural disasters and other crises were also increasing at the time; Bruce's home of Colorado had experienced its most destructive wildfire ever in December 2021, and its three largest wildfires ever in 2020.

In February 2022, the Supreme Court of the United States heard oral arguments for the case West Virginia v. EPA; the court's decision on the case could limit or revoke the ability of the United States Environmental Protection Agency to regulate carbon dioxide emissions, and the conservative majority on the court had indicated that they may do so. The court additionally had other upcoming environmental cases on the docket.

An article in Colorado Newsline noted that when Wynn Bruce was born, the temperature globally was 0.01°C above the average global temperature from the mid-1900s. When he died, the temperature was roughly 0.85°C above that average and continuing to rise.

=== Facebook account ===
In the years before his self-immolation, Bruce expressed intense concern about climate change on his Facebook account, sharing related news articles and praising activists including Greta Thunberg. As early as April 2020, he used the account to decry public inaction in response to the climate crisis.

On October 30, 2020, Bruce posted a link to an edX class focused on the science of climate change. In April 2021, Bruce commented "4-1-1" on the post; in October 2021, he edited the comment, adding a fire emoji. On April 2, 2022, he edited the comment again to add the date "4/22/2022". Additionally, in January 2022, Bruce posted a photo of antiwar activist Thích Nhất Hạnh, who wrote in 1965 on the self-immolation of Buddhist monks that "to burn oneself by fire is to prove that what one is saying is of the utmost importance". Bruce later commented on the post with a quote he attributed to Hanh: "The most important thing, in response to climate change, is to be willing to hear the sound of the earth's tears through our own bodies."

== Self-immolation ==
In the afternoon on Wednesday, April 20, 2022, Bruce asked two of his neighbors if they could drive him to the bus station in Boulder. He told them he intended to travel to Denver to meet with his "meditation group"; he was unable to drive because of his injuries from the 1989 car accident. One neighbor did drop Bruce at the bus station; he was wearing shorts and a t-shirt and carrying a backpack. It is not known how he reached Washington, D.C.

At roughly 6:30 p.m. on April 22, 2022 (Earth Day), Bruce approached the plaza of the United States Supreme Court Building on foot, silently sat down, and immolated himself. According to a photographer who was present at the scene, Bruce sat upright and did not scream or cry out while on fire for a period of about 60 seconds, after which police extinguished the fire; only after the fire was out did he audibly express pain. Police officers used traffic cones to scoop water from a fountain in the plaza to extinguish Bruce. Nobody else was injured. Minutes after the self-immolation, he was airlifted to a hospital by a helicopter belonging to the National Park Service. Bruce died the following day as a result of his injuries; he was 50 years old.

The Supreme Court Police, United States Capitol Police and Metropolitan Police Department closed the area surrounding the plaza to the public, citing the need for further investigation; two streets were briefly closed but reopened by the following day.

== Motivation and analysis ==
While no suicide note or manifesto was located after Bruce's death, friends of his stated that he was protesting inaction with regard to the climate crisis. A climate scientist and Zen priest named Kritee Kanko who was a friend of Bruce asserted on Twitter that he had likely been planning the self-immolation for a considerable length of time, at least a year, and that it was "not suicide" but rather "a deeply fearless act of compassion to bring attention to climate crisis". Kanko later clarified that she was not completely certain of Bruce's motivation for immolating himself. Kanko and other leaders of the Rocky Mountain Ecodharma Retreat Center subsequently released a statement asserting that no Buddhist teacher in Boulder had preexisting knowledge of Bruce's plans, and stating that while they had never "talked about self-immolation" and "do not think self-immolation is a climate action", they understood why someone might resort to self-immolation "given the dire state of the planet and worsening climate crisis". Extinction Rebellion activists stated that Bruce "died to raise the alarm on the climate and ecological crisis". His father Douglas Bruce also attributed the self-immolation to the climate crisis, saying that "this was a fearless act of compassion about his concern for the environment". His friend G. Michael Moore wrote in an opinion article for the Daily Camera that he believed Bruce "simply followed the logic of his convictions without flinching", deciding that the value of an individual life was "negligible compared to the havoc we are rapidly and irrevocably bringing to our planet".

The only public suggestion by Bruce that his self-immolation was motivated by climate change were his posts to Facebook. As of April 24, 2022, the Metropolitan Police Department had opened an ongoing investigation and had not yet determined Bruce's motives. Officials were still working to determine a motive as of April 26. An article published by MSNBC linked the self-immolation to climate grief; The Guardian compared it to a similar act by civil rights lawyer David Buckel four years earlier.

While The Washington Post published a profile of Bruce after his death, an article in The New Republic stated that his suicide had "received startlingly little coverage or op-ed discussion", explaining that coverage of self-immolations in the United States is "intentionally subdued". To avoid the phenomenon of copycat suicide, organizations including Reporting on Suicide publish guidelines advising journalists to avoid reporting details about suicides such as the motive, method, and location.

== Responses ==
Following his death, Bruce's Facebook page became a site for messages from climate activists and his friends. The Independent reported that environmental activists were planning a vigil for him.

The Washington Post reported that while "some people reacted with pity and mockery, assuming in posts on social media that anyone driven to such an extreme must be struggling with their mental health", others expressed that "they understood his despair about the planet's future". USA Today reported that Bruce's death sparked debate on social media, with views split between "sympathy for [...] a sacrificial act" and the argument that such sympathy is a glorification of suicide.

=== By notable figures ===
Climate scientist Peter Kalmus, who had been arrested earlier in April 2022 for locking himself to the doors of the JPMorgan Chase building in Los Angeles as a protest against the bank's investment in fossil fuel projects, tweeted "Rest in power Wynn", adding that "we must fight side by side in solidarity for every fraction of a degree. It is NOT too late."

In The New York Times, writer Jay Caspian Kang argued that "we should resist the urge" to dismiss self-immolation as "the last act of the mentally ill and the desperate". He stated that "Wynn Bruce lit himself on fire on Earth Day 2022 because he believed it might inspire people to work against climate change. There is not any more or less meaning we need to take away from it." In a letter to the editor also published by The New York Times, Margaret Klein Salamon wrote that "collective action is a uniquely effective antidote to despair", arguing that "we can find a sense of purpose and community in the face of the climate crisis" rather than resorting to acts like self-immolation.

Terry Kaelber, who was married to David Buckel until the latter's death by self-immolation in 2018, said that Bruce's death reminded him "of what David did and also the incredible pain this sort of act causes the people who love them". He argued against suicide as a protest tactic, stating that there is "a better way".

=== Memorials ===
A silent memorial for Bruce was held in front of the Supreme Court Building on April 29, 2022. More than 50 people attended, walking slowly and later sitting and meditating; a standing bell and incense were used. Some of the mourners carried flowers while others held cardboard signs with images of Bruce. Political organizers were present and urged people to demand action against the climate crisis on a societal scale.

In May, memorials were held for Bruce in his hometown of Boulder and in Minnesota, where his father lived.

== See also ==
- Alice Herz – anti-Vietnam War activist who died by self-immolation in Detroit in 1965
- Norman Morrison – anti-Vietnam War activist who died by self-immolation at The Pentagon in 1965
- Self-immolation of Aaron Bushnell
- List of political self-immolations
