= Fagbug =

Volkswagen New Beetle

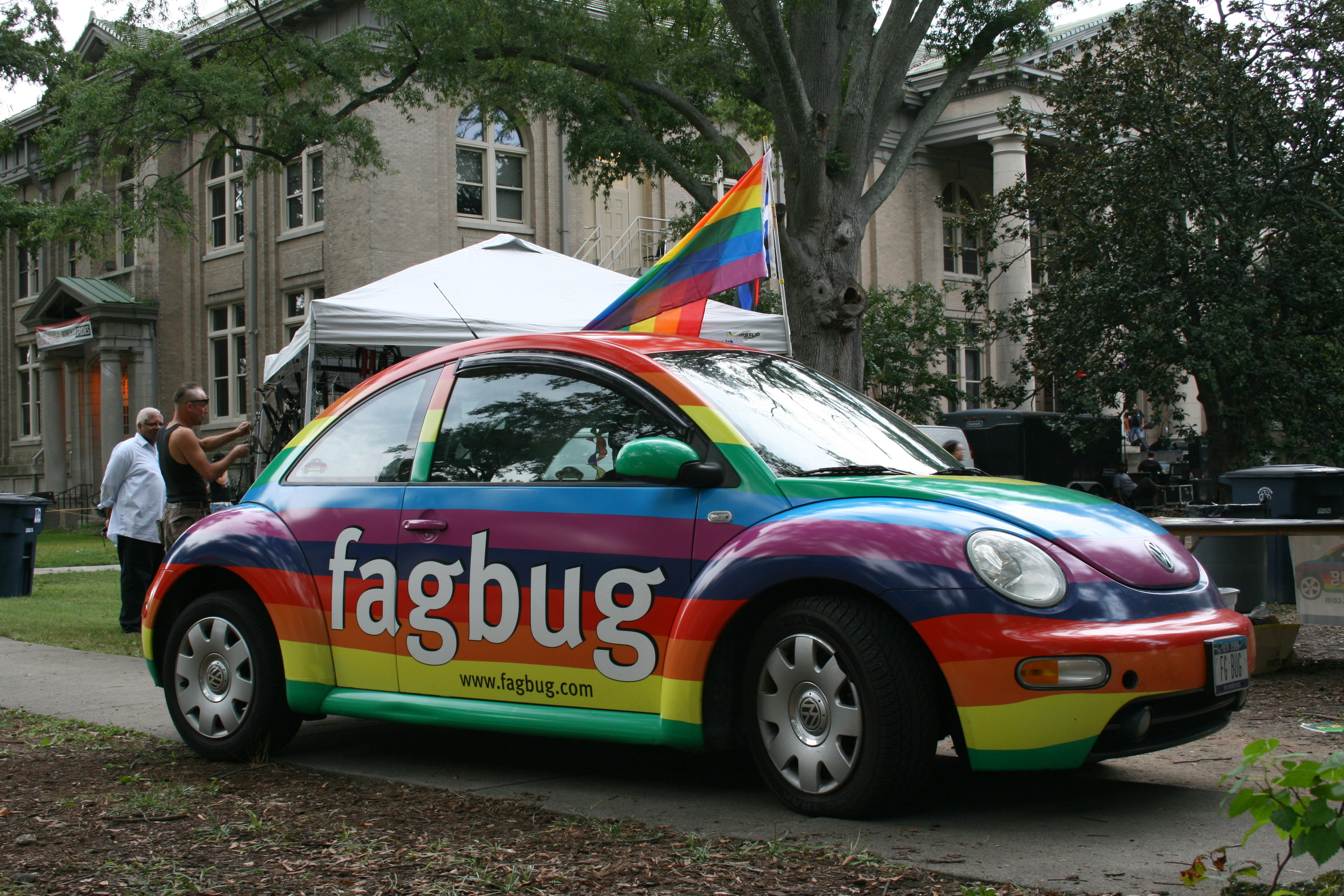
The Fagbug in Durham, North Carolina in 2008.

Fagbug is a Volkswagen New Beetle owned by Erin Davies of Syracuse, New York, who, in response to graffiti on her car, embarked on a cross-American road trip to raise awareness of LGBT rights.

== History ==
On April 18, 2007, Davies, an art education graduate student at Sage College of Albany, found the words "fag" and "U R gay" [sic] spray-painted on her car. In response, she dropped out of college and started on a 55,000-mile (89,000 km) trip through 41 U.S. states, during which she interviewed 536 people and spoke out against hate crimes. Davies received a sponsorship from Volkswagen Group of America and HD Radio to use for gas money, car expenses, and the film.

== See also ==
- Homophobia
- LGBT pride
