= Gender nonconformity =

Non-conventional expression of gender in humans

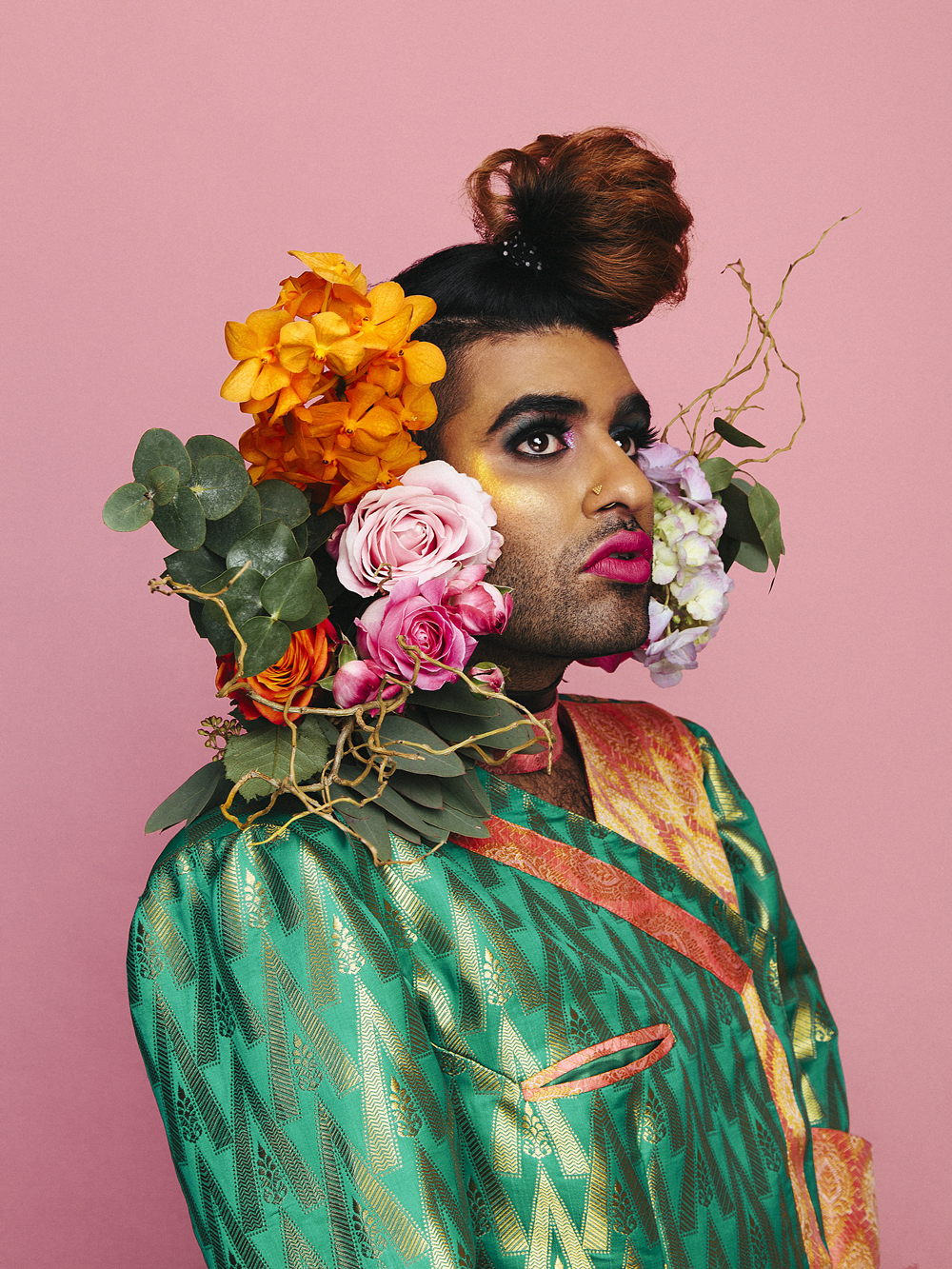
Alok Vaid-Menon, a gender nonconforming writer, performance artist, and activist

Gender nonconformity or gender variance is gender expression by an individual whose behavior, mannerisms, or appearance do not match masculine or feminine gender norms. A person can be gender nonconforming regardless of their gender identity; for example, they may be transgender, non-binary, or cisgender. Transgender adults who appear gender nonconforming after transitioning are more likely to experience discrimination.

== Terminology ==
Gender nonconformity refers to a person's gender expression that differs from socially expected expressions of masculinity and femininity within a gender binary. These expectations vary across cultures and over time within cultures. Gender expression is different from gender identity, a person's inner sense of self as a man (or boy), woman (or girl), or another gender outside the traditional gender binary such as gender-fluid, agender, or non-binary. According to GLAAD (formerly the Gay and Lesbian Alliance Against Defamation), gender expression is the external manifestation of one's gender identity, usually through masculine, feminine, or gender-variant presentation or behavior.

Terms used to describe gender variance include gender-variant, gender nonconforming, gender-diverse, and gender-atypical. The terms gender variance and gender-variant are used by scholars in psychology, psychiatry, anthropology, and gender studies, as well as by advocacy groups of gender-variant people themselves.

The word transgender usually has a narrower connotation, referring to an identity that differs from the gender assigned at birth. GLAAD defines transgender as an "umbrella term for people whose gender identity or gender expression differs from the sex they were assigned at birth." Not all gender-variant people identify as transgender, and not all transgender people identify as gender-variant; many identify simply as men or women.

=== In Australia ===
In Australia, the term gender-diverse or, historically, sex and/or gender-diverse, may be used in place of or alongside transgender. Culturally specific gender-diverse terms include sistergirls/sistagirls and brotherboys, for Aboriginal and Torres Strait Islander people. Ambiguities about the inclusion or exclusion of intersex people in terminology such as sex and/or gender-diverse led to a decline in the use of the terms sex and/or gender-diverse and diverse sexes and genders (DSG). Current regulations providing for the recognition of trans and other gender identities use terms such as gender-diverse and transgender. In July 2013, the Australian National LGBTI Health Alliance produced a guide entitled "Inclusive Language Guide: Respecting people of intersex, trans and gender diverse experience", which clearly distinguishes between different bodily and identity groups.

== In childhood ==
Multiple studies have suggested a correlation between childhood gender nonconformity and later identification as gay, bisexual, or transgender. In multiple studies, a majority of those who identify as gay or lesbian have self-reported gender nonconformity during childhood. However, the accuracy of some of these studies has been questioned.

One study suggested that childhood gender nonconformity is heritable. Studies have also examined adults' attitudes toward nonconforming children. There are reportedly no significant generalized effects, except for a few outliers, on attitudes toward children who vary in gender traits, interests, and behavior.

Children who are gender variant may struggle to conform to gender norms later in life. As children get older, an untreated mismatch between their minds and bodily appearance may lead to discomfort, a negative self-image, depression, suicidal thoughts, or self-doubt. If a child is gender nonconforming at a very young age, family support is important for positive outcomes for both the child and the family. Children who do not conform to gender norms before age 11 tend to have an increased risk of depression, anxiety, and suicidal ideation as young adults. A 2012 study found that both children who would later identify as heterosexual and those who expressed gender nonconformity before the age of 11, were more likely to experience physical, sexual, and psychological abuse.

Roberts et al. (2013) found that among participants aged 23 to 30, 26% of those who were gender nonconforming experienced depressive symptoms, compared with 18% of those who were gender conforming. Treatment for gender identity disorders (GID; now known as gender dysphoria), including cases involving gender variance, has been a topic of controversy since the 1980s. Hill, Carfagnini and Willoughby (2007), citing Bryant (2004), suggest that treatment protocols for these children and adolescents, especially those aimed at converting a child to stereotypical gender norms, may worsen outcomes by causing them to internalize their distress." Treatment for GID in children and adolescents may have negative consequences. Studies suggest that treatment should focus on helping children and adolescents feel comfortable living with GID. Children and adolescents with GID may experience distress that is expressed through gender-related behaviors. Hill et al. (2007) state: "If these youth are distressed by having a condition deemed by society as unwanted, is this evidence of a disorder?" Bartlett and colleagues (2000) note that the problem in determining distress is aggravated in GID cases because it is often unclear whether a child's distress is due to gender variance or secondary effects (e.g., ostracization or stigmatization). Hill et al. (2007) suggest, "a less controversial approach, respectful of increasing gender freedom in our culture and sympathetic to a child's struggle with gender, would be more humane."

Numerous studies have found that LGBTQ+ students experience higher rates of victimization in schools compared to their heterosexual peers, leading to lower well-being and academic performance. While research on the school experiences of gender-variant adolescents is limited, available findings indicate similar trends. Furthermore, understanding gender variance, especially in young children, can be complex, making it challenging for social workers to provide appropriate support. Moreover, school social workers often work in environments that emphasize heteronormativity, where femininity and masculinity are defined in relation to heterosexual relationships, making it difficult to address the needs of gender-variant children.

== Social status for men vs. women ==
Gender nonconformity among people assigned male at birth is usually more strictly, and sometimes violently, policed in the West than gender nonconformity among people assigned female at birth. However, a spectrum of gender nonconformity exists among boys and men. Some forms of gender nonconformity, such as being a stay-at-home father, may pass without comment, whereas others, such as wearing lipstick and skirts, may attract stares, criticism, or questioning. Some cultures are more tolerant of such differences than others.

This is a comparatively recent development in historical terms because the dress and careers of women used to be more heavily policed, and still are in countries such as Iran and Saudi Arabia, where they are regulated by law. The success of second-wave feminism is cited as a chief reason for the increased freedom of women in the West to wear traditionally male clothing, such as trousers, or to take up traditionally male occupations, such as being a medical doctor. In the Soviet Union, women were allowed to take up traditionally male occupations, such as construction work, but were paid less. Employers sometimes preferred women and sometimes preferred men as workers. In some former Soviet countries, progress toward gender equality reversed after the collapse of the Soviet Union.

Gender nonconforming transgender people in the United States have been shown to have worse overall health outcomes than transgender individuals who identify as men or women.

== Association with sexual orientation ==
Gender norms vary by country and culture, as well as across historical time periods within cultures. For example, in Pashtun tribes in Afghanistan, adult men frequently hold hands without being perceived as gay, whereas in the West this behavior would, in most circumstances, be seen as evidence of a homosexual relationship. However, in many cultures, behaviors such as crying, a tendency to care and nurture others in an emotionally open manner, an interest in domestic chores other than cooking, and self-grooming can be seen as aspects of male gender nonconformity. Men who exhibit such tendencies are often stereotyped as gay. Studies found a high incidence of gay men self-reporting gender-atypical behaviors in childhood, such as having little interest in athletics and a preference for playing with dolls. The same study found that mothers of gay men recalled such atypical behavior in their sons with much greater frequency than mothers of heterosexual men.

For women, adult gender nonconformity is often associated with lesbianism because of the limited identities available to women in adulthood. Lesbian and bisexual women, being less concerned with attracting men, may find it easier to reject traditional ideas of womanhood because social punishment for such transgression is ineffective, or at least no more effective than the consequences of being openly gay or bisexual in a heteronormative society, which they already experience. This may help account for the high levels of gender nonconformity self-reported by lesbians.

Gender theorist Judith Butler, in the essay Performative Acts and Gender Constitution: An Essay in Phenomenology and Feminist Theory, states: "Discrete genders are part of what humanizes individuals within contemporary culture; indeed, those who fail to do their gender right are regularly punished. Because there is neither an 'essence' that gender expresses or externalizes nor an objective ideal to which gender aspires." Butler argues that gender is not an inherent aspect of identity, further stating, "...One might try to reconcile the gendered body as the legacy of sedimented acts rather than a predetermined or foreclosed structure, essence or fact, whether natural, cultural, or linguistic."

Research into non-binary gender identities has found the following:

The overwhelming majority of non-binary respondents ... identified as having a sexual minority sexual orientation, which is also consistent with findings from other research. This substantial overlap between non-binary gender and sexual minority status is intriguing and supports the conceptualization that "non-traditional" gender identities (i.e., outside the gender binary) and sexual orientation are distinct yet interrelated constructs.

Bisexual and gay men who do not conform to traditional gender norms might experience increased discrimination compared to those who do. One study found that Latino gay and bisexual men that identify as gender nonconforming faced higher levels of homophobia and psychological distress than their gender-conforming counterparts. Furthermore, nonconformity to traditional gender norms may elevate the risk of suicide attempts among gay adolescents, whereas studies on lesbians do not consistently show similar patterns. This may be attributed to the heightened mistreatment of boys displaying feminine traits by parents and peers, compared with girls displaying masculine traits.

== Clothing ==
Among adults, the wearing of women's clothing by men is often socially stigmatized and fetishized or viewed as sexually abnormal. However, cross-dressing may be a form of gender expression and is not necessarily related to erotic activity, nor is it indicative of sexual orientation. People may cross-dress for a number of reasons, such as fashion, entertainment, or self-expression. Cross-dressing is not exclusive to males; people assigned female at birth can also cross-dress.

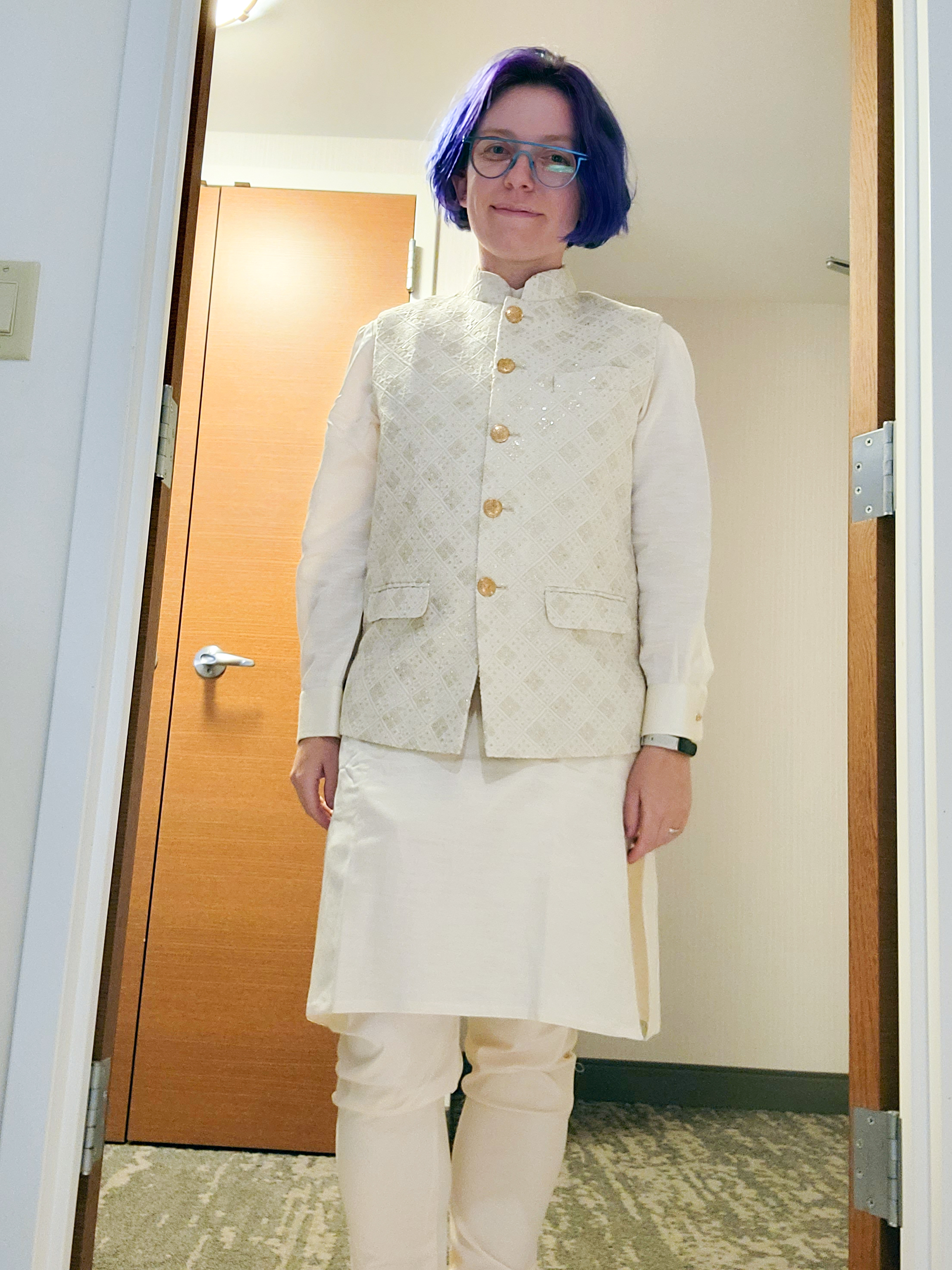
Example of gender noncomformity expressed through cross-dressing

== Gender-affirmative practices ==
Gender-affirmative practices recognize and support an individual's gender self-identification and expression. Gender-affirmative practices are becoming more widely adopted in the mental and physical health fields in response to research indicating that clinical practices that encourage individuals to accept a particular gender identity can cause psychological harm. In 2015, the American Psychological Association published gender-affirmative practice guidelines for clinicians working with transgender and gender nonconforming people. Preliminary research on gender-affirmative practices in medical and psychological settings has primarily shown positive treatment outcomes. As these practices become more widely used, longer-term studies and studies with larger sample sizes are needed to continue to evaluating them.

Research has shown that youth who receive gender-affirming support from their parents have better mental health outcomes than those who do not.

Gender-affirmative practices emphasize "gender health", which Hidalgo et al. define as an individual's ability to identify as and express the gender or genders that feel most comfortable without fear of rejection. Gender-affirmative practices are informed by the following premises:

- Gender variance is not a psychological disorder or mental illness.
- Gender expressions vary across cultures.
- Gender expressions are diverse and may not be binary.
- Gender development is affected by biological, developmental, and cultural factors.
- If pathology occurs, it is more often the result of cultural reactions rather than factors within the individual.

Mental health practitioners have begun integrating the gender-affirmative model into cognitive behavioral therapy, person-centered therapy, and acceptance and commitment therapy. While taking different approaches, each therapeutic modality may be beneficial to gender-variant people seeking to self-actualize, cope with minority stress, or navigate personal, social, and occupational issues throughout their lives.

== Atypical gender roles ==
Gender expectations, like other social norms, can vary widely across cultures. A person may be seen as expressing an atypical gender role when their gender expression and activities differ from those typically expected in that culture. What is typical in one culture may be atypical in another. People from cultures that conceptualize gender as a binary with only two options may view cultures with third-gender categories or fluid gender expressions, and the people who occupy these gender roles, as atypical. Gender expressions that some cultures might consider atypical include:

- Househusbands: men in patriarchal cultures who stay at home to raise children and take care of the home while their partner goes to work. National Public Radio reported that by 2015 this had risen to around 12.6% of heterosexual marriages. This would only be considered atypical in a culture where it is the norm for women to stay home.
- Androgynous people: people having a gender presentation that is either mixed or neutral in a culture that prizes polarised (binary) presentations.
- Crossdresser: a person who dresses in the clothing of, and otherwise assumes, "the appearance, manner, or roles traditionally associated with members of the opposite sex".
- Femminiello: people who embody a third-gender role in traditional Neapolitan culture (southern Italy).
- Hijra: a traditional third-gender identity; individuals are occasionally intersex but are most often assigned male at birth. Many hijra are eunuchs who have chosen to undergo ritual castration in a dedication ceremony. They have ceremonial roles in several traditional South Asian cultures, often performing naming ceremonies and blessings. They dress in what are considered women's garments in those cultures, but are seen as neither men nor women.
- Khanith: effeminate gay men in Omani culture who are allowed to associate with women. The clothing of these individuals is typically intermediate between that of a male and a female.
- Two-spirit: a modern pan-Indian umbrella term used by some Indigenous North Americans to describe Native people in their communities who fulfill traditional third-gender (or other gender-variant) social and ceremonial roles in their cultures. The term two-spirit was created in 1990 at the Indigenous lesbian and gay international gathering in Winnipeg, and "specifically chosen to distinguish and distance Native American/First Nations people from non-Native peoples."
- Male spirit mediums in Myanmar: Biological males who are spirit mediums (nat kadaw) wear women's attire and makeup during religious ceremonies. The majority of male spirit mediums live permanently as women.

== Recovery strategies ==
Recovery strategies are actions that gender nonconforming individuals take in response to backlash from society. These strategies can also result from fear, embarrassment, etc., from an individual's friends and family. Some examples of recovery strategies include hiding non-conforming behavior and conforming to gender norms.

In a 2004 experiment, participants were atypical men and women who were found to have more similarities and knowledge about the opposite atypical sex after taking a survey. In the experiment, the results showed that the participants who feared backlash because of the results were more likely to hide their non-conforming behavior or conform to gender norms.

Hiding non-conforming behavior means repressing behavior that goes against gender norms. In J.M. Brennan, changes in gender identity among nonconforming men or women can lead to such hiding and concealment of behavior. This can be due to fear of stigma being directed toward them, leading to concealment of their true identity.

Children in the LGBT+ community are seen to increase gender conformity in school settings due to peer pressure, which may reflect discrimination faced by LGBT+ individuals.

== See also ==
- Third gender
- List of non-binary political office-holders
- Androgyny
- Discrimination against non-binary people
- Effeminacy
- Gender bender
- Gender diversity
- Gender polarization
- Gender policing
- Transphobia
- Neuroqueer theory
