= Dude, You're a Fag =

2007 book by C. J. Pascoe

Dude, You're a Fag: Masculinity and Sexuality in High School
- Author: C. J. Pascoe
- Language: English
- Subject: Masculinity
- Published: 2007
- Publication place: United States
- Media type: Print (hardcover and paperback)
- Pages: 248
- ISBN: 978-0520271487

Dude, You're a Fag: Masculinity and Sexuality in High School is a 2007 book by the sociologist C. J. Pascoe. Through ethnographic research, Pascoe examines masculinity in high schools. Pascoe's work proposes that masculinity is defined primarily through dominance and control. Further, masculinity is established by high school boys through their use of the epithet "fag". This book explores masculinity as enacted by male and female students, the consequences of a strict gender system, heteronormativity within the school system, racialized masculine ideals, and acts of resistance to the gendered social order. Pascoe conducted fieldwork for a year and a half at "River High School", conducted formal interviews with fifty students, and informal interviews with many other students, administrators and faculty members.

== Masculinity and abject identity ==
Pascoe builds upon the work of American post-structuralist philosopher Judith Butler to argue that the fag is best described as an "abject identity". According to Butler's model, individuals create a gender identity by repeatedly invoking normative ideas of gender and through continual repudiation of those who are unacceptably gendered. Those who do not fit into recognizable gender categories are understood by society as threatening and often face consequences for undermining the gender order.

Many of Pascoe's findings highlight interaction as a way to maintain the fag as a "threatening specter" in the high school setting. The fag epithet is one aspect of gender policing, in which boys point out and ridicule others who fail at masculinity, heterosexual prowess, or strength.

== Fag discourse ==
Labeling others as a fag is a part of what Pascoe describes as "fag discourse", which is central to boys' joking relationships. Joking about the fag both cements relationships among boys and soothes social anxiety. The high school boys in Pascoe's study bond by throwing the fag epithet at one another. Boys call their peers a fag for a number of things, such as being incompetent, showing emotion, caring about appearances, dancing, or expressing (sexual or platonic) interest in other guys. Another aspect of fag discourse is the enactment of the fag, in which high school boys would act out exaggerated femininity or pretend to be sexually attracted to men. Through this behavior, "... boys reminded themselves and each other that at any moment they could become fags if they were not sufficiently masculine" (p.60).

== Racialized masculinities ==
Pascoe's research suggests that hegemonic masculinity has a racial component in the context of the American high school. Not only was masculinity defined differently for whites and people of color, but homophobia manifested itself quite differently among the school's nonwhite population. For black students, achieving masculinity required activities such as caring about clothing and dancing, which would be labeled as fag activities if enacted by white students. Pascoe asserts that, to combat stereotypes about black people as being poor and "ghetto", black students paid close attention to clothing, accessories, and cleanliness. Dancing was also understood to be an important aspect of achieving black masculinity, as it was associated with hip-hop culture.

The black students in Pascoe's research were less likely to engage in fag discourse than the other students. These students often teased one another for being or acting white. If black students did use the fag epithet, they were often talking about homosexuals, rather than effeminate men. When confronted with an effeminate, gay dancer, for instance, black students reacted with humor and admiration for his skills, rather than the hostile or violent reactions typical of white students.

Though the black boys in Pascoe's study were disproportionately popular among their peers, they also faced excessive discipline from school administration. Pascoe posits that this is because of a tendency to assume intentionality with black students in instances of misbehavior. For example, black performers were threatened with expulsion by administrators if they danced too provocatively at school assemblies, while white boys dancing in an equally provocative manner were not warned or disciplined for their behaviors. In this instance, administrators seemed to be influenced by stereotypes of black men as being hypersexual when considering what displays were appropriate at school, while they did not attribute sexuality to the white boys.

== The role of the institution ==
Throughout this work, Pascoe proposed that certain heteronormative, sexist, and racist behaviors were sanctioned by the school. Administrators, staff, and faculty often reinforced heteronormativity and gender essentialism in the classroom, and overlooked instances of harassment and discrimination. In the classroom, teachers often made jokes about sex to keep students engaged. Pascoe noted that these jokes were always directed towards male students, which she believes heightens the taboo of female sexuality and reinforces the idea that boys are hypersexual. School activities such as prom and boy-girl yearbook pairings further reinforced the gendered social order, while marginalizing students who may not conform to gender norms.

== Non-normative students ==
Pascoe focused heavily on a student named "Ricky", an openly gay boy whose mannerisms and behavior were stereotypically feminine. Though many boys in Pascoe's study asserted that they would not use fag as an insult against a gay person, Pascoe declared Ricky "experiences harassment on a regular basis, probably because he couldn't draw on identifiably masculine markers such as athletic ability or other forms of dominance to bolster some sort of claim on masculinity" (p.67). Pascoe asserts that Ricky embodied the abject identity of fag, as he transgressed both gendered and sexual norms. Because he dressed in both women's and men's clothing, Ricky remained highly visible as feminine to his classmates. His involvement in choreographing school assemblies furthered his visibility and position as feminine.

Though Ricky was the most targeted non-normative boy at this high school, other groups dealt with insults for a perceived lack of masculinity. Drama club was routinely labeled as fag, but Pascoe asserts that fag discourse did not seem to occur in this context. Because the boys in drama club were already low in the social hierarchy of the high school, they seemed to have nothing to gain by accusing one another of being fags. Christian boys were also understood as non-normative, as they abstained from sexual activity due to their religious convictions. However, this group laid claim to masculinity by characterizing other boys as immature and vulnerable to their teenage hormones. By asserting mastery over their own bodies, Christian boys portrayed themselves as superior to other groups.

Girls who transgressed gender norms experienced high school in a different way from boys. Pascoe posits that, because masculinity is highly valued in the high school context, girls enacting masculinity often experienced an upgrade in status. A group of masculine, athletic girls, whom Pascoe titles "the basketball girls", best exemplify this phenomenon. Outsiders often characterized the basketball girls as funny, charismatic tomboys. These masculine girls were popular, despite the fact that some were lesbians or had ambiguous sexual identities.

Another group identified by Pascoe were girls involved in the gay–straight alliance (GSA). This group, in contrast to the basketball girls, politicizes their gender ambiguous and lesbian identities. These girls dressed in goth, alternative, or punk styles and often challenged the sexualized and gendered authority of the school. Because of this, group members met antagonism from the school's administration and were not popular among their peers. While the GSA girls challenged sexism and homophobia, the basketball girls often engaged in activities and interactions that reproduced sexist and heterosexist norms, causing the groups to clash at times.

== Criticism ==
Pascoe has been criticized for her interpretations of the male–female interactions that she observed. In her book review, Christine Shearer asserts that Pascoe should have represented students' perceptions and motivations for their seemingly inappropriate actions. Despite this critique, Shearer contends, "Pascoe's analysis is understandable, however, given the many descriptions of incidents that bordered on or were clear cases of sexual harassment" (p.127).

== See also ==
- Michael Kimmel
- Rape culture
