= Socius (journal) =

Socius: Sociological Research for a Dynamic World
- Discipline: Sociology
- Language: English
- Edited by: C. J. Pascoe

Publication details
- History: 2015–present
- Publisher: SAGE Publishing on behalf of the American Sociological Association
- Frequency: Continuous
- Open access: Yes
- License: CC BY
- Impact factor: 3.0 (2023)

Standard abbreviations
- ISO 4: Socius

Indexing
- ISSN: 2378-0231 (print); 2378-0231 (web)
- LCCN: 2015201928
- OCLC no.: 905544040

Links
- Journal homepage; Online archive

Socius is a peer-reviewed open access academic journal that covers research in sociology. It is published by SAGE Publishing on behalf of the American Sociological Association.

== Abstracting and indexing ==
The journal is abstracted and indexed in Scopus. Journal Citation Reports ranked Socius with an impact factor of 3.0 in 2023, placing it 27th out of 2017 journals in the category "Sociology".
