= Faggot =

Homophobic slur

- Homophobic slur
- Part of speech: Noun
- Pronunciation: /ˈfæɡət/
- Etymology: From French fagot, faget
- Meaning: Queer or homosexual people (pejorative)

Faggot, often shortened to fag, is a slur in the English language used to refer to gay men. The slur is also sometimes indiscriminately used against other members of the LGBTQ community, and has also seen extended use in American youth culture beginning around the turn of the 21st century as a broader reaching insult more related to masculinity and group power structure. In a case of linguistic reclamation, many LGBTQ people have reclaimed it as a neutral or positive term for describing themselves, as well as reinforcing in-group solidarity.

By extension, faggotry (or rarely, faggotism or faggotness) are pejoratively used to refer to homosexuality.

== Etymology ==
The first recorded use of faggot as a pejorative term against gay men was in the 1914 A Vocabulary of Criminal Slang, while the shortened form fag first appeared in 1923 in The Hobo by Nels Anderson.

Its association with homosexuality has uncertain origins, probably derives from linguistic patterns in which terms related to the feminine/unmasculine, such as fruit, fairy, and molly, are used to demean homosexual or effeminate men. The application of the term to people is possibly a shortening of the term "faggot-gatherer", recorded at least since the 19th century, when was applied especially for children and women, the latter being often older widows, who made a meager living by gathering and selling firewood. It may also derive from the sense of "something awkward to be carried" (compare the use of the word baggage as a pejorative for "worthless woman" or for old people in general).

An alternative possibility is that the word is connected with the practice of fagging in British public schools, in which younger boys performed (potentially sexual) duties for older boys, although the word faggot was never used in this context, only fag. There is a reference to the word faggot being used in the 17th-century British Isles to refer to a "man hired into military service simply to fill out the ranks at muster", but there is no known connection with the word's modern usage.

The Yiddish word feygeleh (lit. 'little bird'), itself a pejorative term for a gay man, has been claimed by some to be related to the American usage. Feygeleh (pronounced [ˈfɛɪɡələ]) is a term of endearment for a loved one, and a diminutive for the girls' name Faigie ('bird') after Moses's wife Zipporah, Hebrew for 'bird'. The similarity between the two words makes it possible that it might at least have had a reinforcing effect.

There is an urban legend, called an "oft-reprinted assertion" by Douglas R. Harper, creator of the Online Etymology Dictionary, that the modern slang meaning developed from the standard meaning of faggot as "bundle of sticks for burning" with regard to burning at the stake. Two young men, François van Daele, then 19, and Willem de Clerck, 14, were burned at the stake for engaging in homosexual acts with a priest in Bruges, then part of the Spanish Netherlands, during the late Middle Ages. They were just two of 406 people charged with "sodomy" between 1400 and 1700 in the Netherlands. While sexual intercourse between same-sex people was considered to be sodomy and was often punished, in some parts of Europe, such as Florence, it could be seen as merely a youthful indiscretion. The emergence of the slang term in 20th-century American English is unrelated to any historical death penalties for homosexuality; moreover, homosexuality in England and its colonies was never punished by immolation but instead by the accused being hanged and their property taken.

== Use ==
=== Early printed use ===
The word faggot with regard to homosexuality was used as early as 1914, in Jackson and Hellyer's A Vocabulary of Criminal Slang, with Some Examples of Common Usages which listed the following example under the word "drag": "All the fagots (sissies) will be dressed in drag at the ball tonight."

The word fag is used in 1923 in The Hobo: The Sociology of the Homeless Man by Nels Anderson: "Fairies or Fags are men or boys who exploit sex for profit."

The word was also used together with another homophobic slur, bulldyke, by a character in Claude McKay's 1928 novel Home to Harlem, indicating that it was used during the Harlem Renaissance. Specifically, one character says that he cannot understand: "a bulldyking woman and a faggoty man".

=== Use in the United Kingdom ===
Originally confined to the United States, the use of the words fag and faggot as slurs for gay men has spread elsewhere in the English-speaking world, but the extent to which they are used in this sense has varied outside the context of imported US popular culture. In the UK and some other countries, the words queer, homo, and poof are much more common as pejorative terms for gay men. The word faggot in the UK also refers to a kind of meatball. In British English, "fag" is common slang for a cigarette, sometimes also used to describe a tedious task.

Use of fag and faggot as the term for an effeminate man has become understood as an Americanism in British English, primarily due to entertainment media use in films and television series imported from the United States. When Labour MP Bob Marshall-Andrews was overheard supposedly using the word in a bad-tempered informal exchange with a straight colleague in the House of Commons lobby in November 2005, it was considered to be homophobic abuse.

=== Usage by youth ===
Faggot, used as a discriminatory term, has expanded beyond gay men. It is often used by the youth in online communities to describe any queer person or someone who differs from the norm. In some cases, the term is completely unrelated to homosexuality and simply used as an insult due to its negative connotation, similar to gay.

Through ethnographic research in a high school setting, C. J. Pascoe examined how American high school boys used the term fag during the early 2000s. Pascoe's work, culminating in a 2007 book titled Dude, You're a Fag: Masculinity and Sexuality in High School, suggested that these boys used the fag slur as a way to assert their own masculinity, by claiming that another boy is less masculine; this, in their eyes, makes him a fag, and its usage suggests that it is less about sexual orientation and more about gender. One-third of the boys in Pascoe's study claimed that they would not call a homosexual peer a fag, leading Pascoe to argue that fag is used in this setting as a form of gender policing, in which boys ridicule others who fail at masculinity, heterosexual prowess, or strength. Because boys do not want to be labeled a fag, they hurl the insult at another person. Pascoe felt the fag identity does not constitute a static identity attached to the boy receiving the insult. Rather, fag is a fluid identity that boys strive to avoid, often by naming another as the fag. As Pascoe asserts, "[the fag identity] is fluid enough that boys police their behaviors out of fear of having the fag identity permanently adhere and definitive enough so that boys recognize fag behavior and strive to avoid it."

In the 1990s and early 2000s, the word faggot became somewhat removed from its original meaning when used by youth, who commonly used it as a synonym for the word stupid. In a 2018 study completed by the Anti-Defamation League surveying Generation Z from Grade 6 and up, youth perspectives on the phrase "that's so gay" and homophobic slurs highlight concerns over its use as a synonym for "stupid," which respondents viewed as offensive and insensitive. Some believe it reflects a lack of awareness rather than intent to harm, yet it still evokes frustration and discomfort, pointing to a need for more thoughtful language.

=== Use in popular culture ===
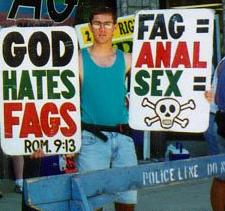
Benjamin Phelps, Fred Phelps' grandson and creator of the first "GodHatesFags" webpage, is also from the Westboro Baptist Church, which regularly employs picket signs such as these using fag as slur.

There is a long history of using both fag and faggot in popular culture, usually in reference to gay and bisexual men. Rob Epstein and Jeffrey Friedman's 1995 documentary The Celluloid Closet, based on Vito Russo's book of the same name, notes the use of fag and faggot throughout Hollywood film history. The Think Before You Speak campaign has sought to stop fag and gay being used as generic insults.

==== Theater ====
In 1973, a Broadway musical called The Faggot was praised by critics but condemned by gay liberation proponents.

Larry Mitchell and Ned Asta's 1977 cult book The Faggots and Their Friends Between Revolutions inspired a musical by composer Philip Venables and director Ted Huffman reinterprets world history from a queer perspective. The term is used in a sense of reclamation.

==== Books and magazines ====
Larry Kramer's 1978 novel Faggots discusses the gay community including the use of the word within and towards the community. A description of Pamela Moore's 1956 novel Chocolates for Breakfast in the Warner Books 1982 culture guide The Catalog of Cool reads: "Her fifteen-year-old heroine first balls a fag actor in H'wood, then makes it with some hermetic, filthy rich, hotel-bound Italian count."

In its November 2002 issue, the New Oxford Review, a Catholic magazine, caused controversy by its use and defense of the word in an editorial. During the correspondence between the editors and a gay reader, the editors clarified that they would only use the word to describe a "practicing homosexual". They defended the use of the word, saying that it was important to preserve the social stigma of gays and lesbians.

==== Music ====
===== 1960s =====
Arlo Guthrie uses the slur in his 1967 signature song "Alice's Restaurant", noting it as a potential way to avoid military induction at the time (Guthrie had removed the word from live performances of the song in the 21st century).

Phil Ochs uses the slur in his 1969 song "I Kill Therefore I Am". In the song, which is written from the point of view of a hateful police officer, he uses the slur to describe the student activists who protested the Vietnam War.

===== 1970s =====
The Sex Pistols used the word in their song "New York".

===== 1980s =====
The Dire Straits 1985 song "Money for Nothing" makes notable use of the slur faggot, although the lines containing it are often excised for radio play, and in live performances by singer/songwriter Mark Knopfler. The song was banned from airplay by the Canadian Broadcast Standards Council in 2011 but the ban was reversed later the same year. Ironically, the song in context makes it clear he is actually mocking the jealous and homophobic nature of the antagonist in the song by adopting a third-person point of view to show the irony, bigotry, and ignorance of the character.

In 1989, Sebastian Bach, lead singer of the band Skid Row, created a controversy when he wore a T-shirt with the parody slogan "AIDS: Kills Fags Dead".

===== 2000s =====
The 2001 song "American Triangle" by Elton John and Bernie Taupin uses the phrase, "God hates fags where we come from." The song is about Matthew Shepard, a gay man from Wyoming whose 1998 murder brought national and international attention to hate crime legislation at both the state and federal level.

In December 2007, BBC Radio 1 caused controversy by editing the word faggot from their broadcasts of the Kirsty MacColl and The Pogues song "Fairytale of New York", deeming it potentially homophobic; however, the edit did not extend to other BBC stations, such as BBC Radio 2. Following widespread criticism and pressure from listeners, the decision was reversed and the original unedited version of the song was reinstated, with clarification from Andy Parfitt, the station controller, that in the context of the song the lyrics had no "negative intent".

===== 2010s–2020s =====
Eminem used the word in numerous works, such as "Rap God" (2013), along with an inflammatory lyric containing the term being removed from "Fall".

A number of rappers have also used the slur in songs supporting the LGBT community. In 2012, Macklemore used the word faggot in the song "Same Love" in reference to the use of the homophobic slur in cyberbullying. Kendrick Lamar's 2022 song "Auntie Diaries" is also supportive of the LGBT community; however, it sparked controversy for its repeated use of the slur, as well as for deadnaming his transgender uncle.

==== Television ====
In November 2009, the South Park episode "The F Word" dealt with the overuse of the word fag. The boys use the word to insult a group of bikers, saying that their loud motorcycles ruined everyone else's nice time. Officials from the dictionary, including Emmanuel Lewis, visit the town and agree that the meaning of the word should no longer insult homosexuals but instead be used to describe loud motorcycle riders who ruin others' nice times. The episode is a satire on the taboo of using the term, as it goes against political correctness.

== Reclamation ==
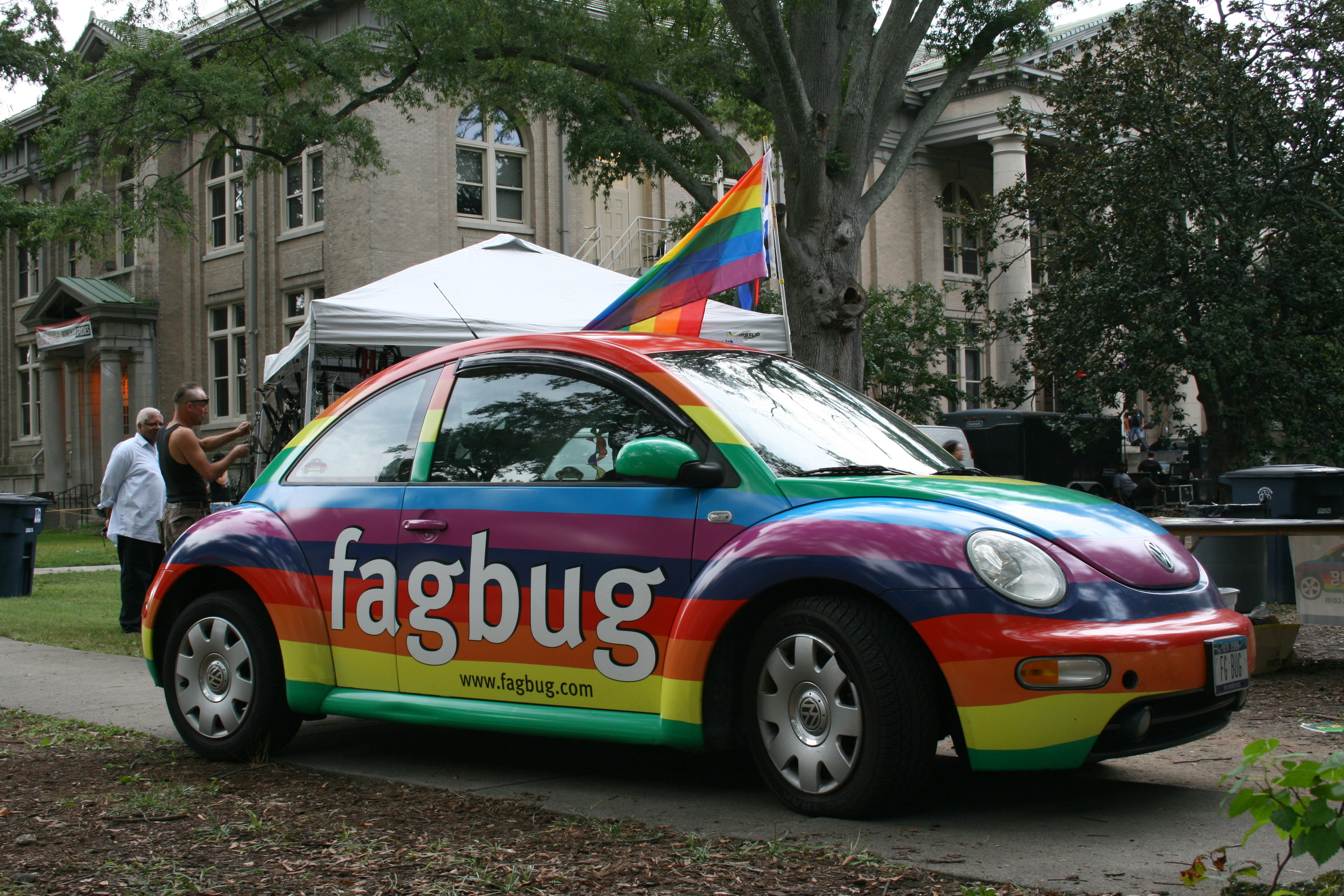
In response to "fag" graffiti spray-painted on her car, an owner of a New Volkswagen Beetle named it the "Fagbug" and embarked on a trans-American road trip to raise awareness of homophobia and LGBT rights. The journey was documented in a film of the same name.

Some LGBTQ+ individuals have reclaimed the term as a neutral or positive term of self-description. The reclamation of slurs focuses on reinforcing in-group solidarity, restricting the use of the reclaimed slur to members of the targeted group.

In 2009, Erin Davies' car, displaying a Pride flag, was defaced with homophobic slurs resulting in a 58-day tour across the U.S. and Canada, keeping the graffiti as a conversation starter about LGBTQ+ experiences with intolerance. This journey led to her documentary Fagbug, an 80-minute film highlighting homophobia and the LGBTQ+ community's resilience in reclaiming and addressing derogatory terms. Davies' work exemplifies LGBTQ+ culture's longstanding efforts to transform slurs into tools for education and empowerment.

== See also ==
- Breeder
- Fag hag
- Fag stag
- Gayphobia
- Hate mail
- Hate speech
