= Nabozny v. Podlesny =

- Court: United States Court of Appeals for the Seventh Circuit
- Full case name: Nabozny v. Podlesny
- Argued: March 28, 1996
- Decided: July 31, 1996
- Citations: 92 F.3d 446; 65 USLW 2116; 111 Ed. Law Rep. 740

Court membership
- Judges sitting: William J. Bauer, Jesse E. Eschbach, Joel Flaum

Case opinions
- Majority: Eschbach, joined by a unanimous court

Laws applied
- Fourteenth Amendment (Due Process Clause, Equal Protection Clause)

Nabozny v. Podlesny, 92 F.3d 446 (7th Cir. 1996) was a case heard in the United States Court of Appeals for the Seventh Circuit regarding the protection of a school student in Ashland, Wisconsin, who had been harassed and bullied by classmates because of his sexual orientation. The plaintiff in the case—Jamie Nabozny—sought damages from school officials for their failure to protect him from the bullying. A jury found that this failure violated Nabozny's constitutional rights. Nabozny settled the case for $962,000 in damages.

== Background ==
Jamie Nabozny (born October 1975) went to the local public middle school in the small Wisconsin town of Ashland, where his parents Bob and Carol Nabozny had grown up. His parents had a rocky relationship, which wasn't helped by poverty. In spite of this, he managed to do well in school. Bullies at Nabozny's school believed him to be effeminate and "girlish", and bullied him as a result. The harassment reached a point where at age 13, Nabozny complained to his parents who decided to send him to live with an uncle and aunt temporarily who would homeschool him. Nabozny's aunt consoled him for the bullying and he shared with her the secret that he was gay but this disclosure did not fit with her religious beliefs. Nabozny ran away, and his aunt informed the police who investigated his running away and in the course of their investigation disclosed Nabozny's sexuality to his parents. His mother Carol was supportive and loving, but his father Bob reacted in anger, storming out of the room after telling Jamie that it was simply a phase.

Nabozny's return to middle school led to the harassment recommencing. He told a school counselor that he had been called a "queer", a "faggot" and a "fudge packer" among other terms and confirmed to the counselor that he was indeed gay and did not wish to deny this. The counselor attempted to intervene and get the bullies to stop but it resumed shortly after the intervention. A new counselor arrived at the school who also attempted to make the bullying stop by involving the school principal, Mary Podlesny. Despite the intervention of the principal, the abuse soon resumed and now started including physical violence—hits, kicks and elbows.

In addition to Nabozny's sexual orientation, another fact led into his bullying. At age 11, Jamie Nabozny was molested by an 18-year-old church youth group leader named Nick Rising. He kept this abuse secret until Rising attempted to molest Jamie's younger brother. Rising was arrested, pleaded guilty at trial and went to jail. The scandal was reported in a local newspaper. A number of the bullies who were harassing Nabozny were friendly with Rising and blamed Nabozny for reporting the sexual assaults.

Nabozny's parents complained repeatedly about the bullying but after no action was taken by the principal, they pulled Jamie out of school and transferred him to a Catholic middle school to finish seventh grade. The cost of the tuition fees meant that he dropped out shortly after starting eighth grade. Jamie Nabozny had to return to the middle school where he endured more harassment, homophobic language and physical violence. In one incident, Jamie and his brother Corey were physically assaulted by a group of boys in the bathrooms.

Following this harassment, Bob and Carol Nabozny complained again to the school and demanded a meeting with the Principal. At the meeting with the Nabozny family and a number of the boys who Jamie had accused of bullying, the Principal took the word of the bullies and then also later told Jamie Nabozny that if he continued to be out about his sexual orientation at school, the bullying would continue. The bullies faced no disciplinary actions and the harassment continued. Following a number of bullies verbally abusing him, inappropriately touching him and then enacting a mock rape while the rest of his class watched, Nabozny went to the principal who told him that "boys will be boys" and admonished him for entering her office without an appointment. The continued bullying at middle school led to Nabozny attempting suicide, after which he refused to return to middle school.

At high school, the same bullies returned and the harassment continued. At one point, Nabozny was attacked while at a urinal and urinated upon by another boy. William Davis, the principal at the high school continued the inaction—the perpetrators were not disciplined and the only advice Davis gave to Nabozny was to go home to change his clothes. He attempted suicide for a second time.

Nabozny's parents attempted to send him to live with an aunt and uncle in Drummond, Wisconsin, but his uncle was hostile to his homosexuality, leading him to run away from them and hitch-hike to Minneapolis. Bob and Carol Nabozny attempted to find him in Minneapolis and distributed 'missing child' posters. Nabozny phoned the number listed on one of the posters and was reunited with his parents. Nabozny told his parents that he refused to return to the high school. They sought to homeschool him but were legally forbidden as neither had a high school diploma. They could not afford to send him to a private school, and the only private school nearby was a Christian fundamentalist school. The school district demanded that Jamie return to high school, where the bullying started again.

Nabozny's parents requested the local social services department put him into foster care out of the district so he could attend school elsewhere. At the new school, the bullying that Nabozny suffered was promptly resolved by the school. The new school seemed to boost his happiness and self-confidence as well as his grades. The social worker who had moved Nabozny demanded that he move back to his parents during tenth grade. He then had to return to the high school in Ashland, where the bullying restarted. The school continued to ignore the bullying and assistant principal Thomas Blauert told Nabozny that his harassment was due to him provoking them and that he deserved the punishment because of his sexuality. Blauert also laughed when Nabozny was pushed and tripped in the hallway.

For over four years, no school official took any disciplinary action in response to Nabozny's reports. In the eleventh grade, he was attacked in the school library by a group of boys, one of whom repeatedly kicked him in the stomach which caused him to have pain and a stomach cramp for weeks. The internal bleeding and bruising required surgery.

In December 1992, Nabozny collected together over $100 in cash and ran away from Ashland and took a bus to Minneapolis. In Minneapolis, he moved in with a gay church deacon and his partner who served as foster parents. He was diagnosed with depression and post traumatic stress disorder and spent years in therapy. Eventually, he completed his GED and became a student at the University of Minnesota and studied for a degree in psychology.

== The case ==
Nabozny decided to sue the school district and was represented by Lambda Legal, an LGBT legal organization. They had made a policy decision in 1995 to take cases involving youth issues. Nabozny was represented by Patricia Logue, a lawyer who had previously worked in corporate law before taking a job with Lambda in Chicago in 1993 along with David Springer, Michael Terrien and Paul Huff, attorneys with Skadden Arps Meagher and Flom LLP. Logue had previously helped a black LGBT group change the policy of the Bud Billiken Parade in Chicago.

The case was brought against the school district as well as a number of the school officials. Nabozny's lawyers argued that his rights under the Fourteenth Amendment to equal protection and due process had been violated by the school's failure to protect him as a member of a discernible minority group, namely gay people. They also argued that his rights under Wisconsin law to not be discriminated against were violated by the school district. The plaintiffs also pointed to the existence of school anti-harassment policies and argued that they were being enforced in a discriminatory manner: when sexist abuse was reported by female students, it was quickly stopped by school officials in a way they did not do for homophobic bullying.

The District Court made a summary judgment in favor of the school district. Nabozny appealed to the Seventh Circuit federal appeals court which found that the school district had infringed his equal protection rights on the grounds of combined gender and sexual orientation discrimination, but rejected the due process claim.

Judge Jesse E. Eschbach concluded in his judgment:

The defendants ask us to affirm the grant of qualified immunity because "there was no clear duty under the Equal Protection Clause for the individual defendants to enforce every student complaint of harassment by other students the same way." The defendants are correct in that the Equal Protection Clause does not require the government to give everyone identical treatment. Nothing we say today suggests anything to the contrary. The Equal Protection Clause does, however, require the state to treat each person with equal regard, as having equal worth, regardless of his or her status. The defendants' argument fails because they frame their inquiry too narrowly. The question is not whether they are required to treat every harassment complaint the same way: as we have noted, they are not. The question is whether they are required to give male and female students equivalent levels of protection; they are, absent an important governmental objective, and the law clearly said so prior to Nabozny's years in middle school.

== Reception and significance ==
Catherine A. Lugg, a professor of education at Rutgers University, said that the facts of the case "clearly illustrates the public school's historic power as the enforcer of expected norms regarding gender, heteronormativity and homophobia" and also shows "how devastating a homophobic public school culture can be for queer children".

In 1997, the Department of Education clarified that Title IX requires schools to provide students with an environment free of harassment and that this requirement includes gay and lesbian students.

Since the Nabozny case, other students who have brought similar cases have generally won. Such cases include:

- a student in Minnesota called Jesse Montgomery
- a California student named George Loomis who suffered homophobic abuse from teachers and students. One teacher said of Loomis' ear rings: "Only two kinds of guys wear earrings, pirates and faggots, and I don't see any water around here." Loomis' case was settled in 2002 by the Visalia Unified School District for $130,000.
- A group of students in Santa Clara, California, who filed suit against the Morgan Hill Unified School District in 1998. One of the students—Alana Flores—had a note taped to her locker reading "Die, die, dyke bitch. Fuck off. We'll kill you." After reporting this to the school principal, she was told: "You need to go back to class. Don't bring me this trash anymore. This is disgusting." The case settled on January 6, 2004, and the school district is now required to provide training on homophobic harassment.
