= C. J. Pascoe =

American sociologist and author (born 1974)

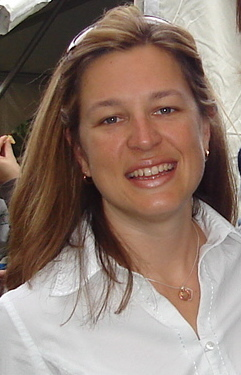
- Born: June 3, 1974 (age 52); Seattle, Washington, U.S.
- Education: University of California at Berkeley
- Known for: Work in Queer Studies
- Scientific career
- Fields: Sociology
- Workplaces: University of Oregon
- Website: https://www.cjpascoe.org/

Cheri Jo Pascoe (born June 3, 1974) is a queer American sociologist and author. She is currently an associate professor at the University of Oregon. Her research focuses on gender, youth, homophobia, sexuality, and news media. She is currently one of the editors of the journal Socius.

== Early life and education ==
She received her undergraduate degree from Brandeis University in Waltham, Massachusetts. She received her PhD in sociology from University of California, Berkeley.

== Academic career ==
Pascoe started her career as a sociologist right out of graduate school, working as a consultant for the Digital Youth Project in California founded by The John D. and Catherine T. MacArthur Foundation. The Digital Youth Project, based out of UC Berkeley, studies how youth use new media and addresses three main objectives: “The first objective is to describe kids as active innovators using digital media rather than as passive consumers of popular culture or academic knowledge. The second objective is to think about the implications of kids' innovative cultures for schools and higher education and to engage in a dialogue with educational planners. The third objective is to advise software designers about how to use kids' innovative approaches to knowledge and learning in building better software.” While Pascoe was working with the Digital Youth Project, she studied teens and how they used new media. She found that they were mostly using forms of new media throughout their romantic and dating lives.

Pascoe is especially interested in how teenage boys think of themselves as masculine. She spent a year and a half following teenage boys in a high school in California and found that they prove their masculinity by calling each other negative homosexual slurs. She found that these teenage boys prove themselves by calling others unmasculine or "fags" when they behave in unmasculine ways. “To call someone gay or fag is like the lowest thing you can call someone. Because that’s like saying that you’re nothing,” is how one teenage boy put it to Pascoe.

She has also been interested in the subculture of pro-ana websites create and how women with anorexia use the web as a way to connect and encourage anorexia and other eating disorders.

“This is by all means not all anorexics; I wouldn't even say the majority of anorexics or people with eating disorders are in this kind of community. These are primarily women who set out to have an eating-disordered lifestyle. This is not a teenager who's gone on a diet and taken it too far and is getting help. There's a difference between those two things. These are, again, primarily women who take pride in their ability to deny themselves food and to keep their weight at this artificially low and dangerous level”.

Pascoe's research has been featured in the New York Times, The Wall Street Journal, The Globe and Mail, American Sexuality Magazine, and Inside Higher Ed.

== Teaching career ==
Pascoe was an assistant professor at Colorado College. Pascoe is now an associate professor at the University of Oregon. She teaches courses in sexuality, social psychology, deviance, gender and education.

She has also taught sociology at Mills College and the University of California, Berkeley.

== Books ==
Pascoe has published a variety of books, including:

- Dude You’re a Fag: Masculinity and Sexuality in High School (June 2007). The book won the American Educational Research Association's 2007 Book of the Year Award.
- Nice is Not Enough: Inequality and the Limits of Kindness at American High (February 2023).
- Pascoe is also a contributor to the coauthored book Hanging Out, Geeking Out and Messing Around: Living and Learning with New Media (November 2009).
