= Gordon Browne =

English book illustrator (1858–1932)

Gordon Frederick Browne
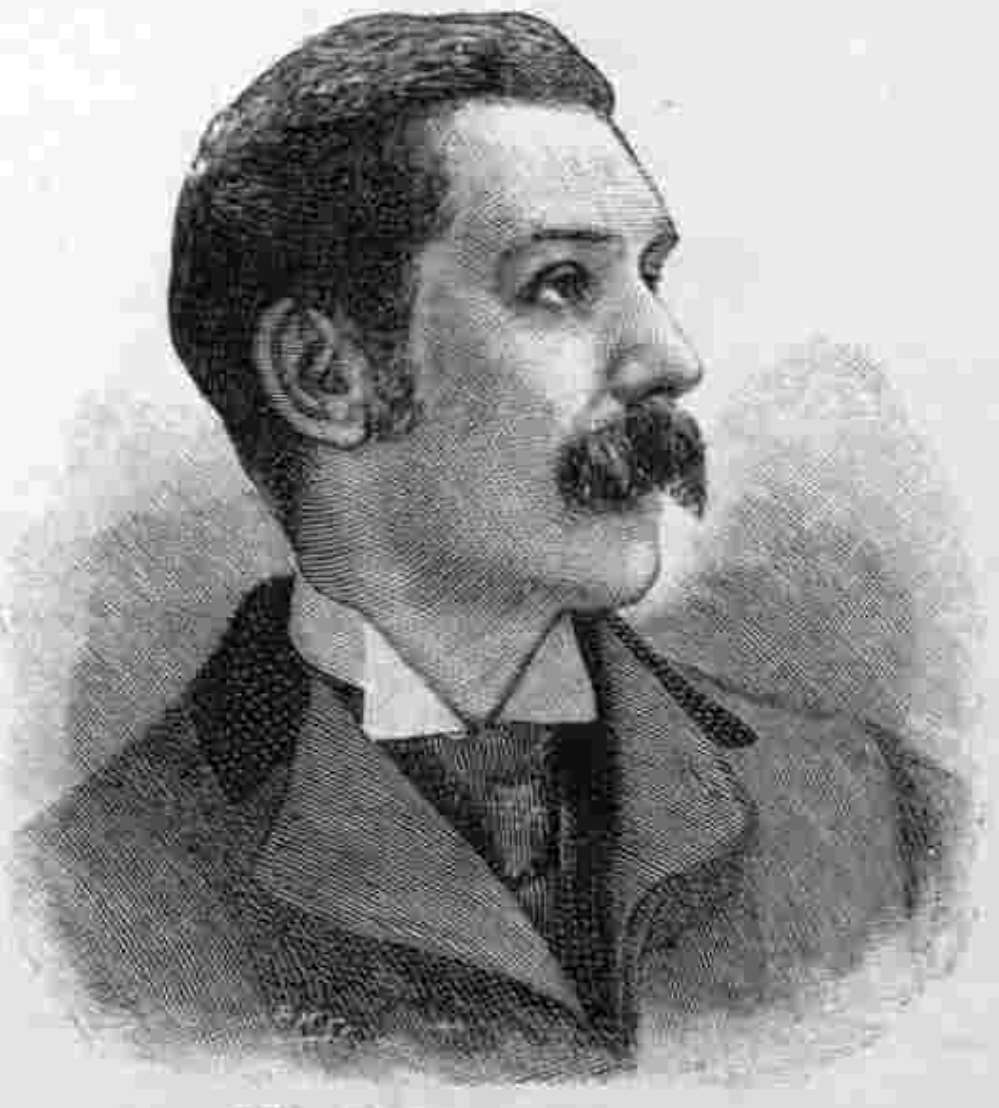
- Gordon Browne in 1892
- Born: 15 April 1858; Banstead, Surrey, England
- Died: 27 May 1932 (aged 74); Richmond, Surrey, England
- Other name: Signed illustrations GB
- Occupations: Illustrator and artist
- Years active: 1875–1932
- Known for: Illustrating children's books
- Notable work: The 552 illustrations and 32 full-page etchings he did for The Henry Irving Shakespear (1895)
- Father: Hablot Knight Browne

Gordon Frederick Browne RI RBA (15 April 1858 – 27 May 1932) was an English artist and a prolific illustrator of children's books in the late 19th century and early 20th century. He was a meticulous craftsman and went to a great deal of effort to ensure that his illustrations were accurate. He illustrated six or seven books a year in addition to a huge volume of magazine illustration.

== Early life ==
He was born in Banstead, the younger son of notable book illustrator Hablot Knight Browne (who as "Phiz" illustrated books by Charles Dickens). He was privately educated and then studied art at the Heatherley School of Fine Art and South Kensington Schools. At Art School he insisted on drawing only from life.

== Work ==
Browne worked in watercolour and pen and ink. He was a member of the Royal Institute of Painters in Water Colours (RI) and a founder member of the Royal Society of British Artists (RBA). Browne was an early member of the Society of Graphic Art and showed three works at their first exhibition in 1921.

Some sources say that Browne began accepting commissions when still a student as money was in short supply at home as his father had been unwell in 1867 and was partly incapacitated by illness. However, Kirkpatrick considers this unlikely as Browne was only 9 years of age in 1867, and that his earliest known illustrations only appeared in 1875.

Brown's first book illustrations was for The Day After the Holidays (1875), a school story by Ascott R Hope. This inaugurated numerous commissions for books and for contributions to periodicals. Among these was work for Aunt Judy's Magazine He then drew several Christmas cards and took a course in drawing on wood. James Cooper, his tutor, introduced him to Blackie's, the London publishers, for whom he began to illustrate juvenile books. The first book he illustrated for Blackie was Facing Death: The Hero of the Vaughan Pit (1882) by G. A. Henty.

From the 1880s, Browne was one of Britain's most prolific illustrators. Houfe says that "Browne illustrated a truly amazing quantity of boy's stories, tales and novels". His total volume of work was enormous. Kirkpatrick gives the estimate that Browne produce c. 3,660 images in his work. Browne also wrote himself. He exhibited his work extensively with over 200 works exhibited during his life (a few of these may have been repeated at different venues). (Note: Browne exhibited as follows: two works at the Royal Birmingham Society of Artists, five works at the Glasgow Institute of the Fine Arts, 17 works at the Walker Art Gallery, Liverpool, five works at the London Salon, one work at the Manchester City Art Gallery, 17 works at the Royal Academy, 26 works at the Royal Society of British Artists, 132 works at the Royal Institute of Painters in Water Colours, and four works at the Royal Institute of Oil Painters.)

=== Book illustration ===
Browne illustrated six or seven books a year. His historical research for his illustrations was painstaking. He assembled a collection of armour, helmets, pistols, daggers, swords, uniforms, and even saddles. When working, he would refer to these constantly to ensure his depictions of historic dress and arms were accurate.

Browne took great care that he understood the text he was illustrating. He would read the text first, and then read it again to identify the details of the scene to be illustrated. Such was Browne's renown for his careful research that George Bernard Shaw, in a review of Stories of Old Renown by Ascot R. Hope said: Mr. Hope describes Guy of Warwick as unhorsed, and fighting the dragon with his sword after he has been thrown and has lost his spear. Mr. Gordon Browne's illustration shows Guy on horseback fighting with his sword. Which is right?

==== Example of book illustration ====
Browne illustrated fourteen of G. A. Henty's novels, including the first seven published by Blackie and Son. One of these was Facing Death: The Hero of the Vaughan Pit: A Tale of the Coal Mines. This was first published by Blackie in 1882 with six drawings by Gordon Browne. A second version of the first edition was published in the same year, but this time with eight illustrations as shown here.

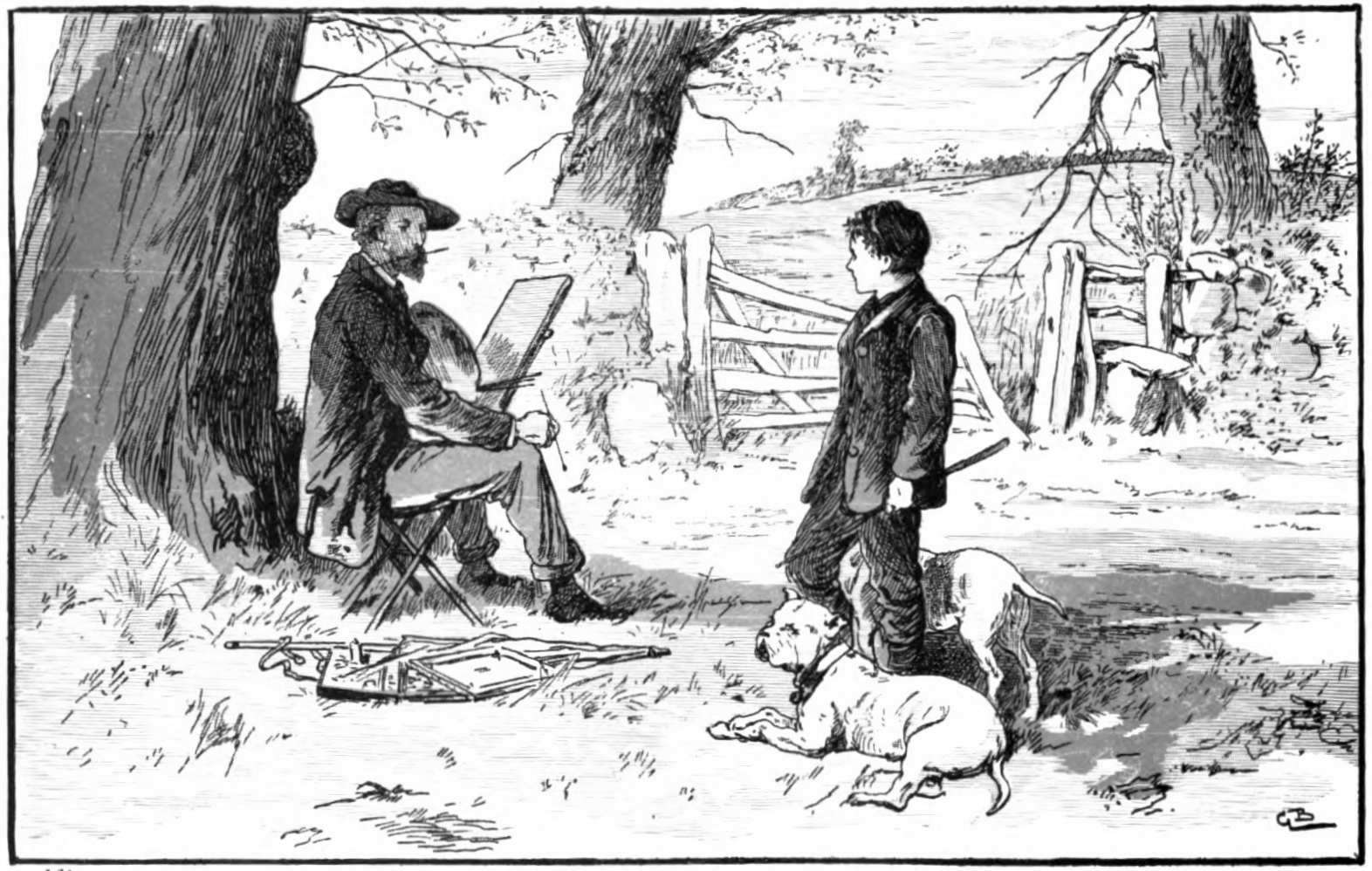
Bulldog finds a friend

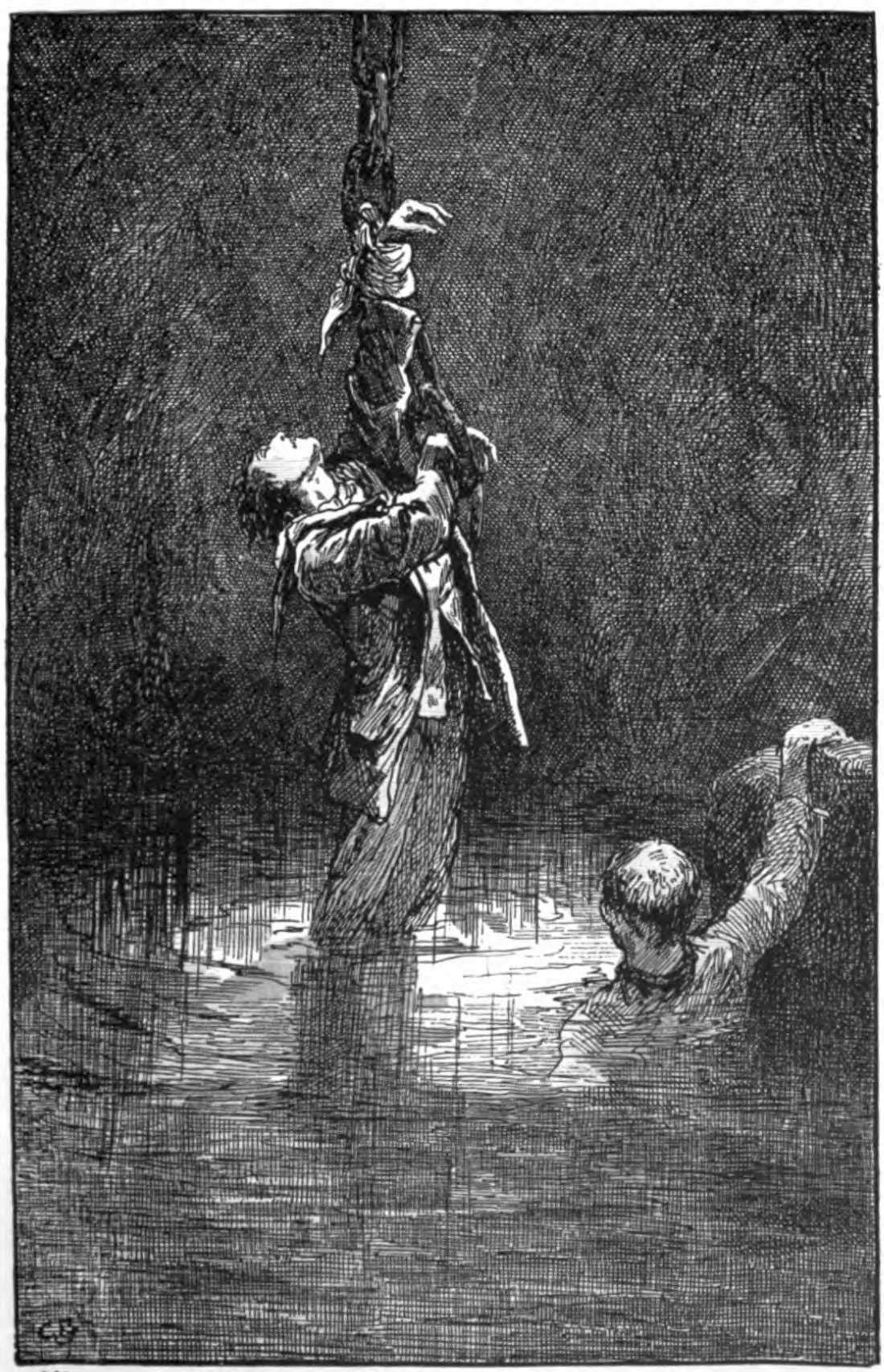
In the old shaft - will he be saved

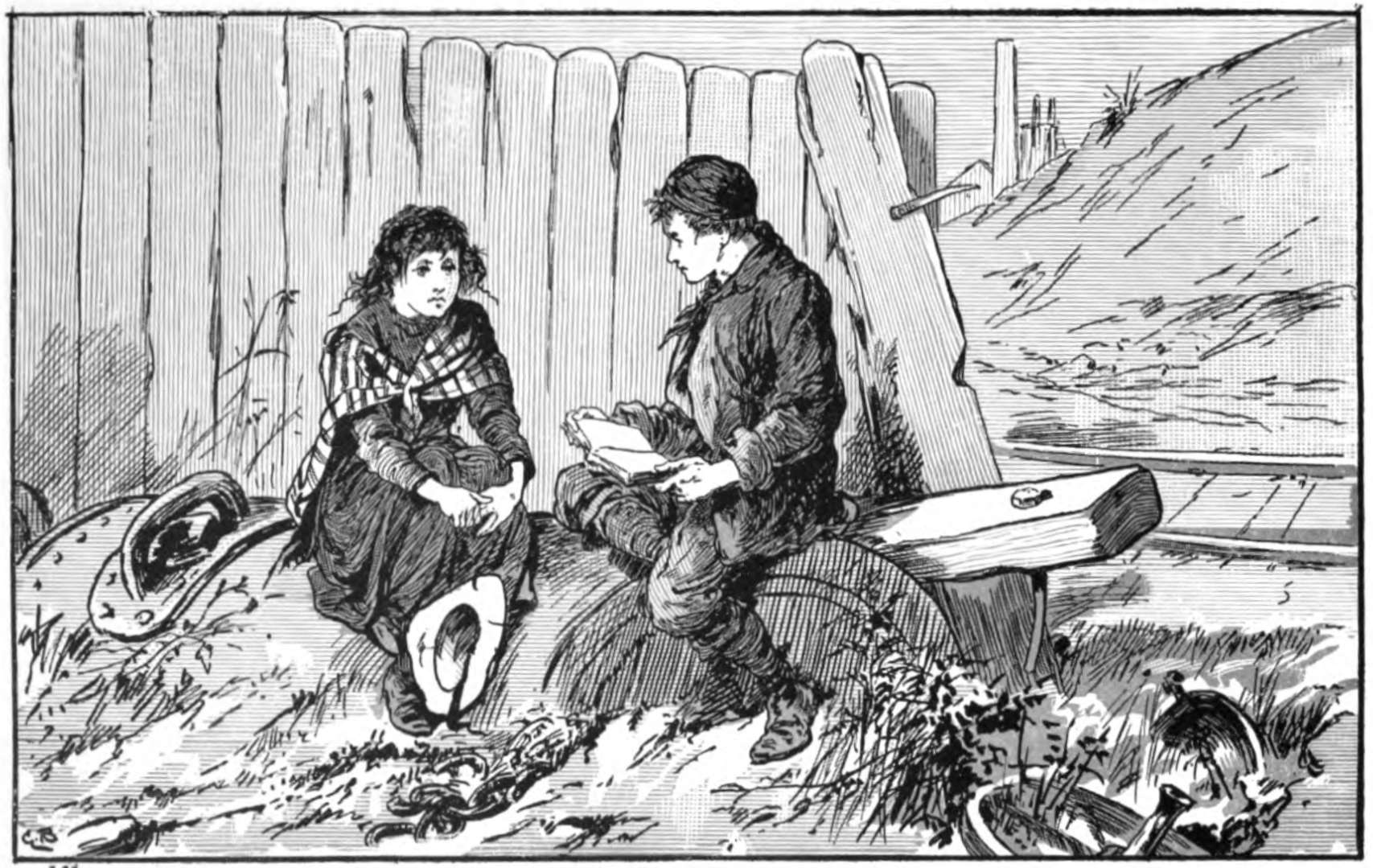
Nelly's first lesson

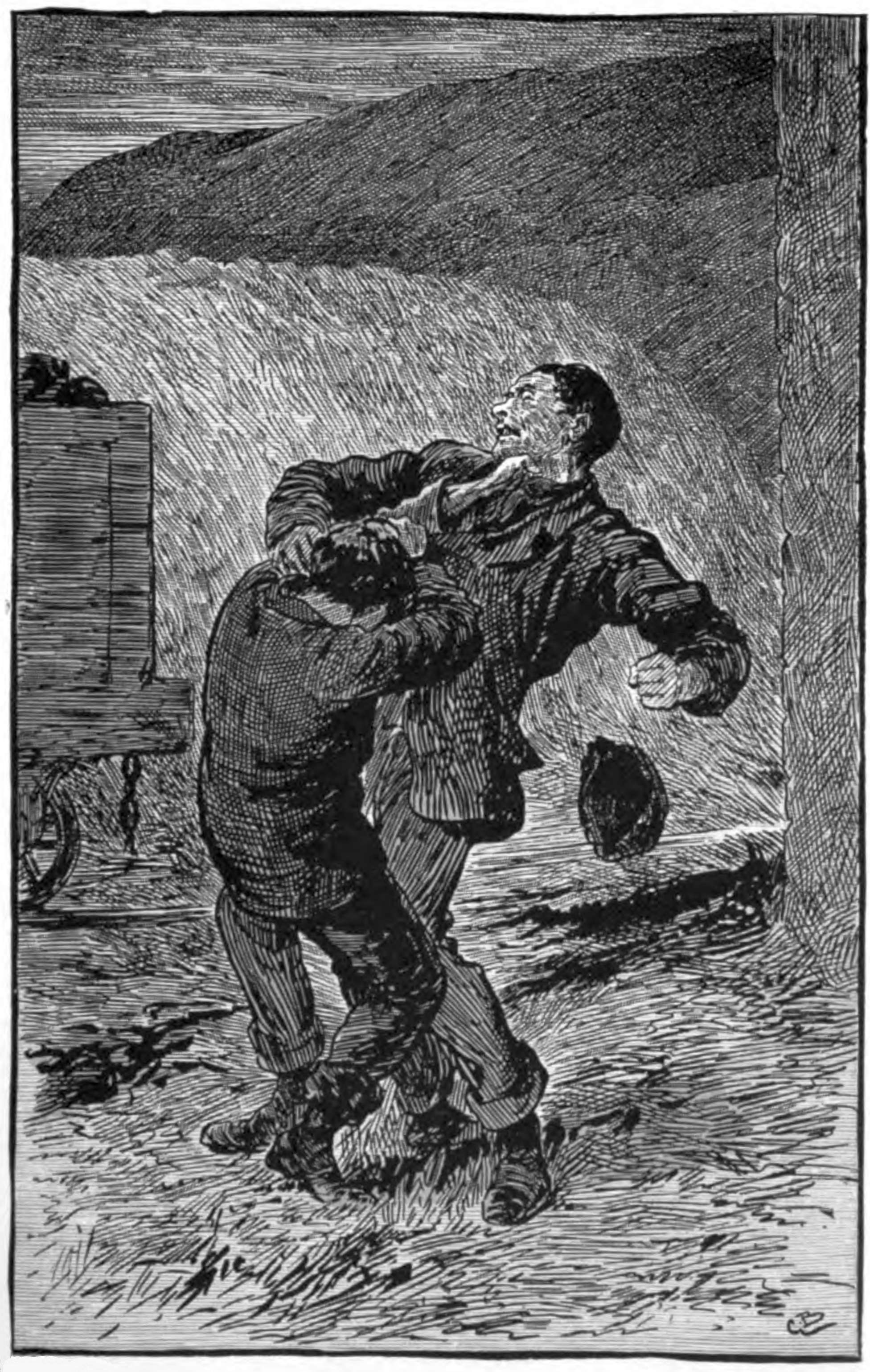
A life and death struggle

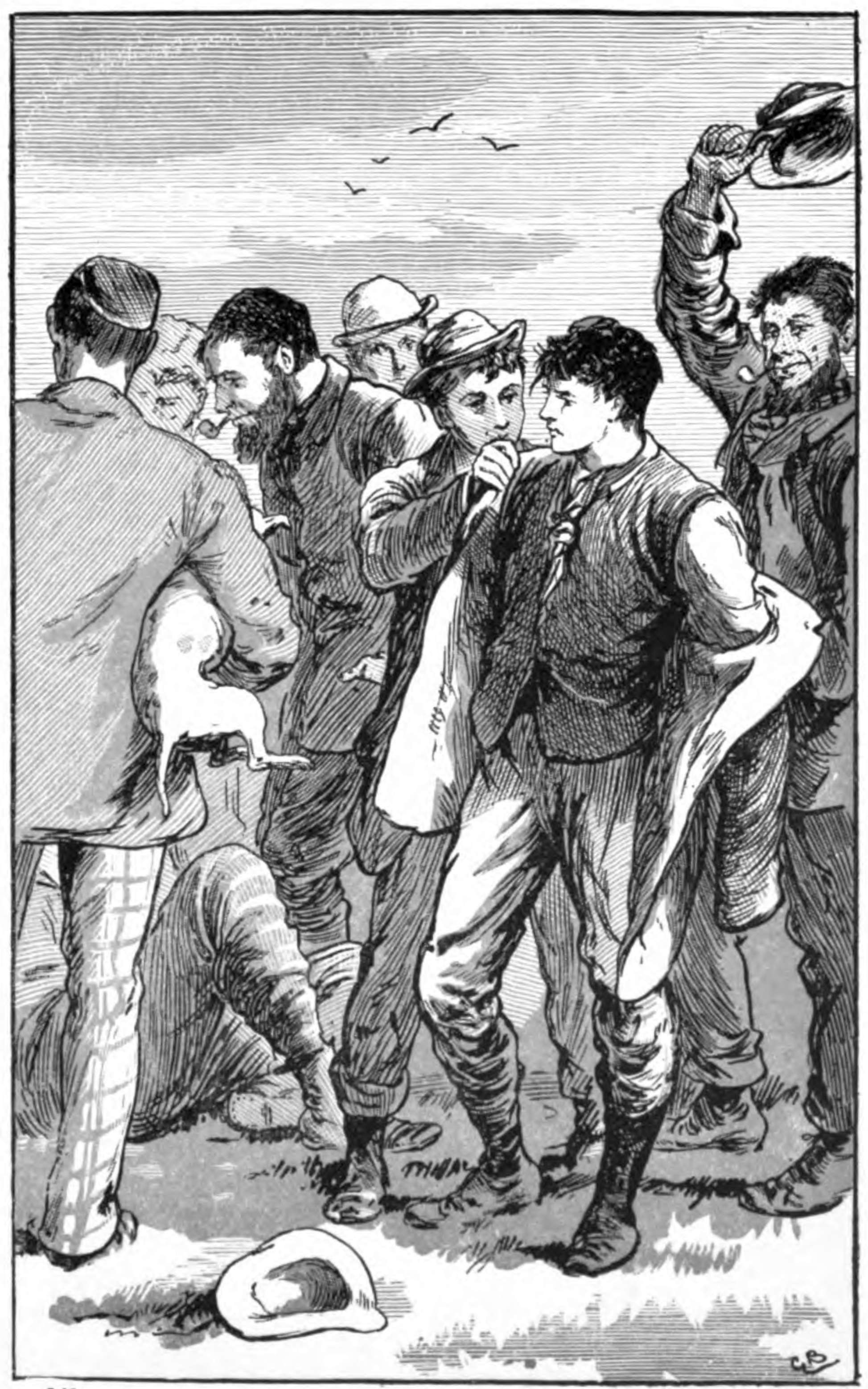
Jack is victorious

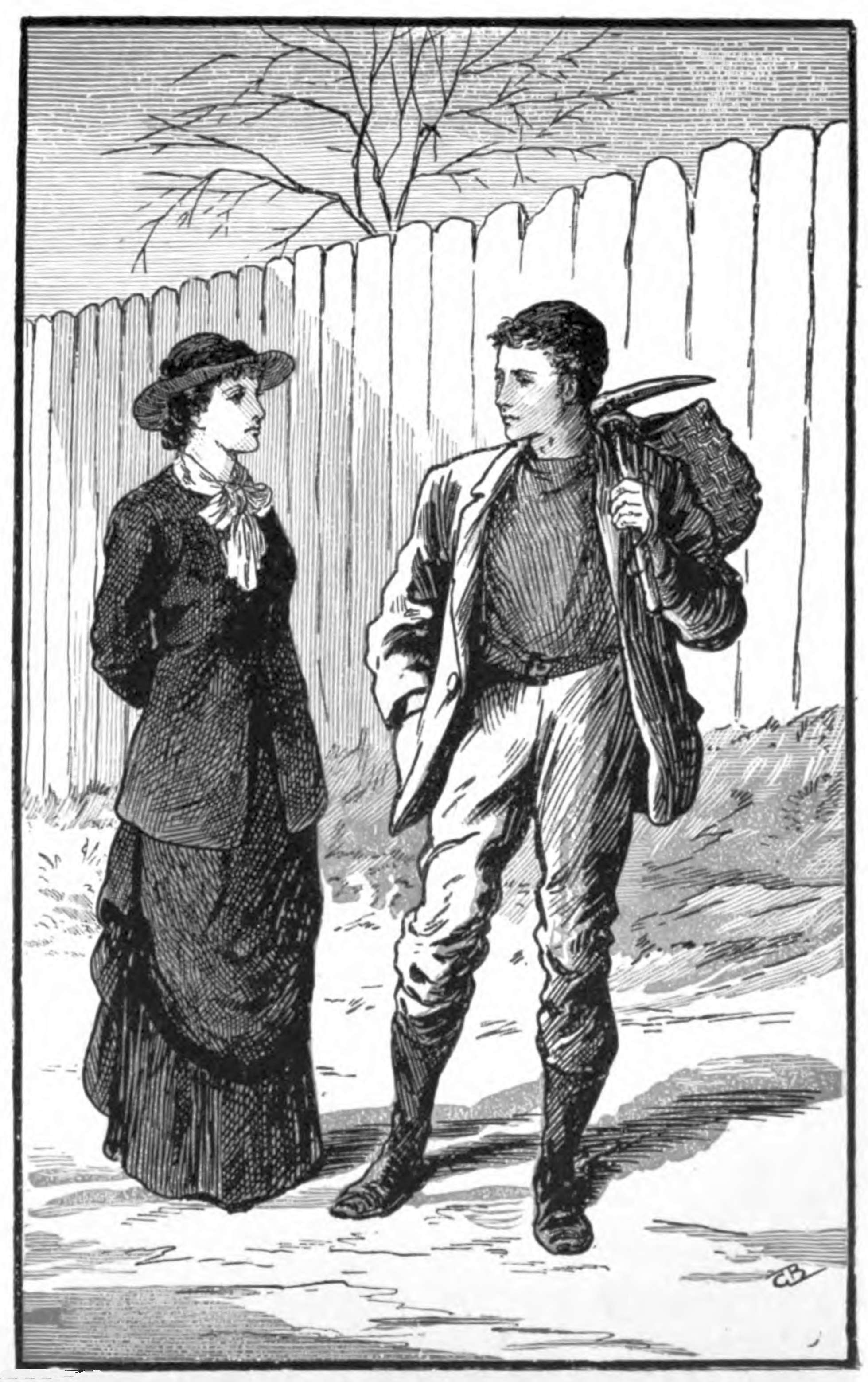
The new school mistress

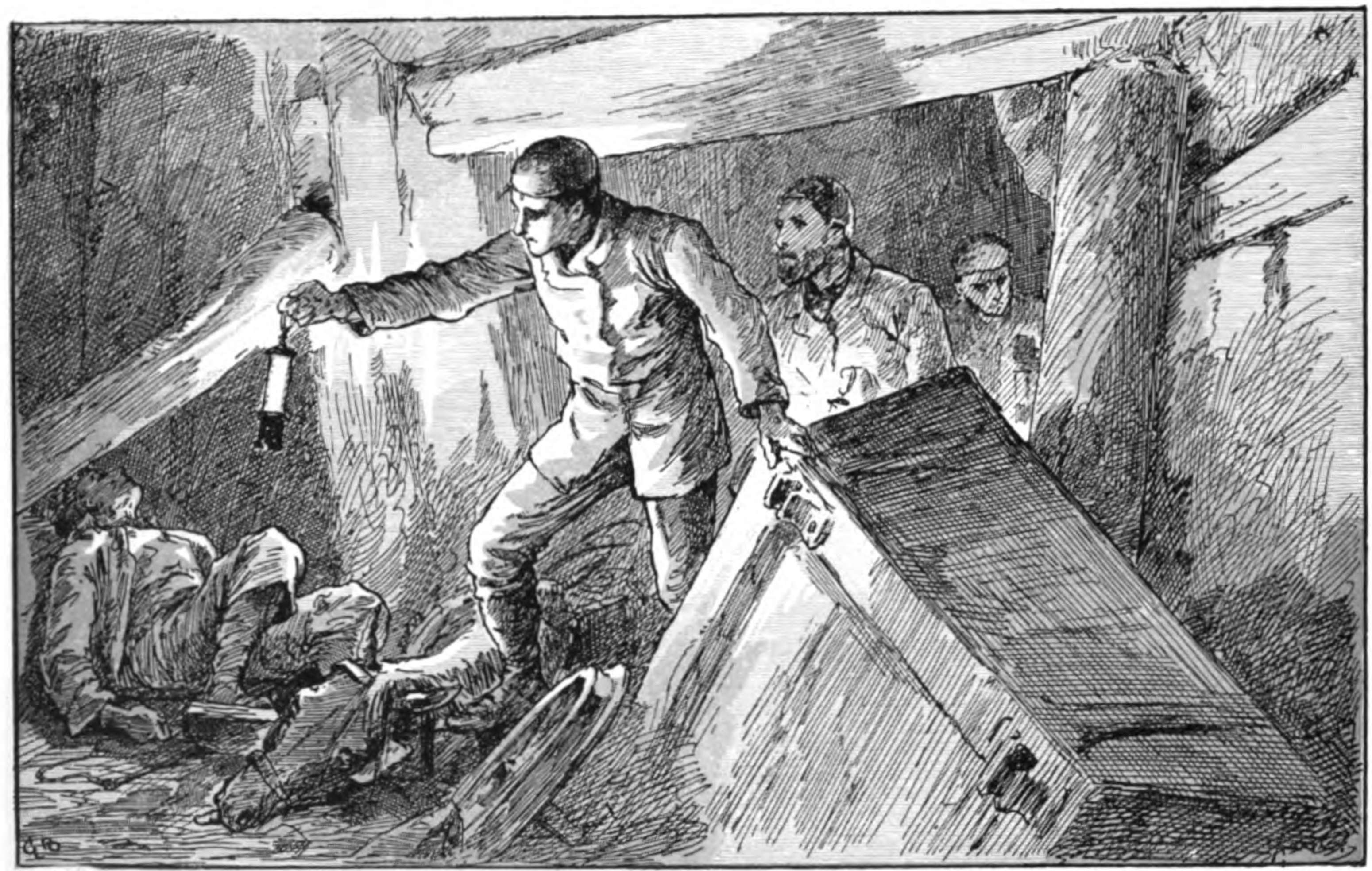
After the first explosion - the search party

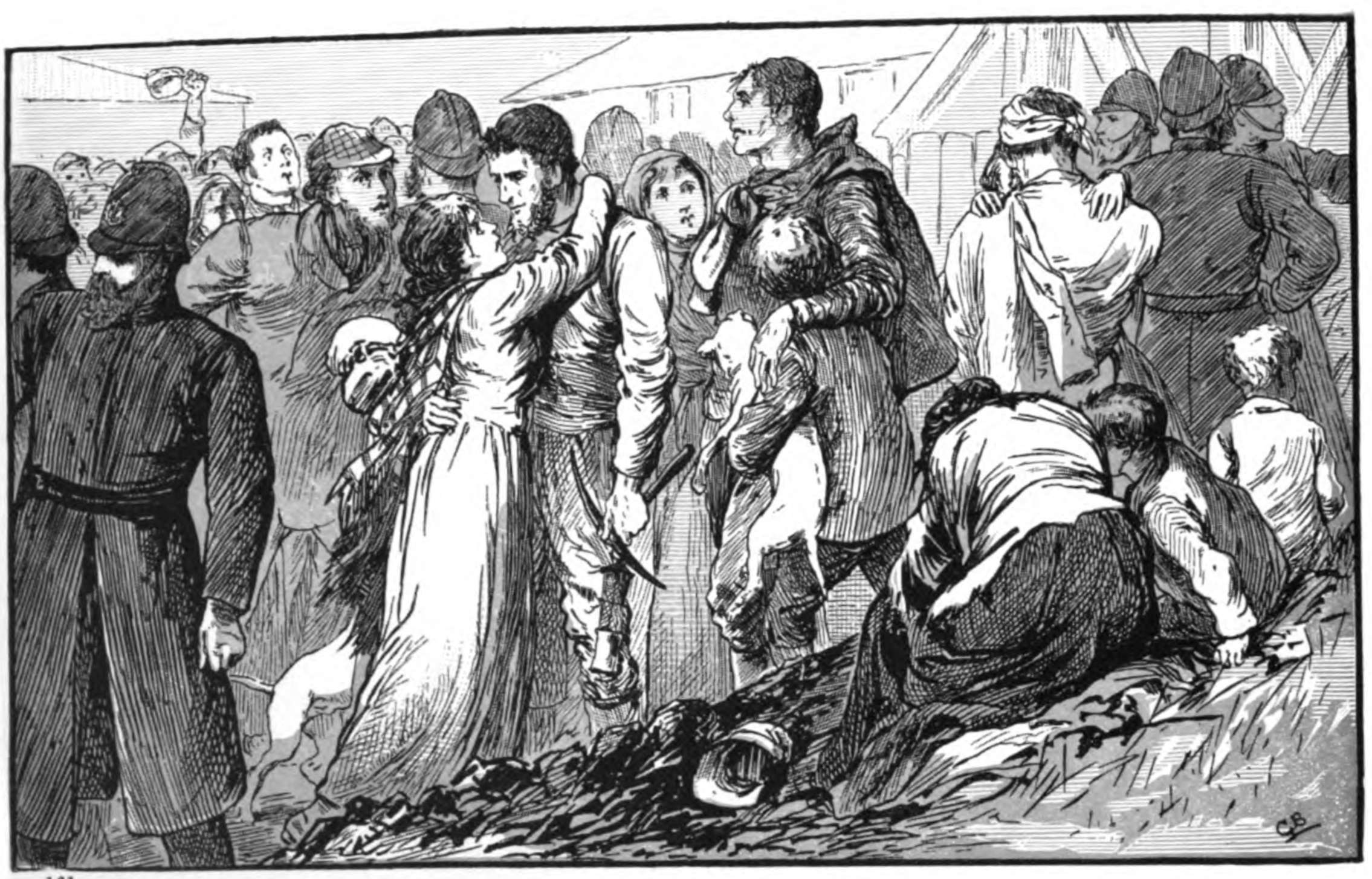
Saved

==== Authors illustrated by Browne ====
The range of authors whose books were illustrated by Brown is extensive and the list, drawn from a range of sources includes:

- Grant Allen (1848–1899), a Canadian science writer and novelist.
- Hans Christian Andersen (1805–1875), a prolific Danish author best remembered for his fairy tales.
- Sir Edwin Arnold (1832–1904), an English poet and journalist, who is most known for his work The Light of Asia.
- Helen Atteridge (1856–1931), author of children's fiction.
- R. M. Ballantyne (1825–1894), a prolific Scottish author of juvenile fiction and an accomplished water-colourist.
- Alice Banks, who wrote books for young children.
- R. D. Blackmore (1825–1900), an English novelist now best remembered for Lorna Doone.
- Catherine Christian (1901–1895), an English novelist, known for her children's books and re-telling of Arthurian legends.
- Harry Collingwood (1843–1922), a writer of boys' adventure fiction, usually in a nautical setting.
- Alice Corkran (1843–1916), an Irish author of children's fiction and an editor of children's magazines and annuals.
- E. E. Cowper (1859–1933), Edith Eliza Cowper, a prolific English author of juvenile fiction, much of which was published by the SPCK, who had eight children by Frank Cowper, yachtsman and author, from whom she separated shortly after the last of her children was born.
- Samuel Rutherford Crockett (1859–1914), a prolific Scottish novelist, who wrote more than 60 books.
- F. J. Harvey Darton (1878–1936), an author, publisher, and historian of children's literature.
- Countess d'Aulnoy (c. 1650 – 1705), a French writer best known for her fairy tales.
- Daniel Defoe (c. 1659 – 1731), who wrote Robinson Crusoe and A Journal of the Plague Year among other works.
- Miguel de Cervantes (c. 1547 – 1616), a Spanish writer best known for Don Quixote.
- Evelyn Everett-Green (1856–1932), who moved from pious stores for children, through historical romances, to adult romances under a range of pseudonyms.
- Juliana Horatia Ewing (1841–1885), an English writer of children's stories, which show both an insight into childhood and a strong religious faith.
- B. L. Farjeon (1838–1903), a prolific English novelist, playwright, printer and journalist.
- Frederick Farrar (1831–1903), an Anglican cleric, schoolteacher, and author of essays and of boys' school stories.
- George Manville Fenn (1831–1909), a prolific author of fiction for young adults.
- Amy Le Feuvre (1861–1929), a prolific author of books for children with a Christian message.
- Friedrich de la Motte Fouqué (1777–1843), a German writer of the Romantic style.
- Jean Froissart (c . 1337 – c. 1405), a French-speaking medieval author and court historian whose work embodied the chivalric revival.
- Thomas Guthrie (1803–1873), a Scottish religious preacher and philanthropist.
- George Halse (1826–1895), an English sculptor, novelist, and poet.
- Herbert Hayens (1861–1944), who wrote juvenile fiction and school-books
- G. A. Henty (1832–1902), a prolific writer of boy's adventure fiction, often set in a historical context, who had himself served in the military and been a war correspondent.
- Silas Hocking (1850–1935), a prolific Cornish novelist and a Methodist preacher.
- Edwin Hodder (1837–1904), a prolific author on many topics including travel, geography, history, and religion.
- Ascott R. Hope (1846–1927), a prolific author of children's books, especially school stories, and of Black's Guides.
- Frank Hudson, an English novelist who wrote on sporting topics and for children.
- Washington Irving (1783–1859), an American short-story writer, essayist, biographer, historian, and diplomat who wrote Rip Van Winkle and other stories.
- Harry Jones (1823–1900), an Anglican cleric and author, magazine contributor and editor, and a chaplain-in-ordinary to Queen Victoria.
- Andrew Lang (1844–1912), the prolific Scottish author interested in folk and fairy tales.
- Lord Tennyson (1809–1892), the Poet Laureate of the United Kingdom during much of Queen Victoria's reign.
- Mary MacLeod (1859–1914), an editor and publisher's reader who summarised stories from Shakespeare and others for children.
- John Masefield (1878–1967), an English poet and writer, and UK Poet Laureate from 1930 – 1967.
- L. T. Meade (1844–1914), Elizabeth Thomasina Meade Smith, a prolific Irish writer of stories for girls.
- Mrs Molesworth (1839–1921), an English writer of children's stories, who also wrote adult novels under a pseudonym.
- Alice T. Morris (1851–1955), wrote illustrated books for young children, married book designer and graphic artist Talwin Morris.
- E. Nesbit (1858–1924), an English poet and novelist who wrote The Railway Children among other works.
- Barry Pain (1864–1928), an English journalist, poet and writer.
- Charles Reade (1814–1884), an English novelist and dramatist.
- Talbot Baines Reed (1852–1893), an English writer of boys' fiction, especially school stories.
- William Clark Russell (1844–1911), an English writer, best known for his novels in nautical settings.
- George Edmund B. Saintsbury (1845–1933), an English writer, literary historian, scholar, critic and wine connoisseur.
- Walter Scott (1771–1832), the Scottish historical novelist, poet, and historian who wrote Ivanhoe.
- William Shakespeare (1564–1616), the Bard of Avon.
- R. L. Stevenson (1850–1894), the Scottish poet and novelist who wrote Treasure Island and other adventure fiction.
- Jonathan Swift (1667–1745), an Anglo-Irish satirist, essayist, pamphleteer, poet and cleric, best remembered for Gulliver's Travels.
- Georgina M. Synge (1858–1911), who wrote books for young children, and on travel.
- William Makepeace Thackeray (1811–1863), a British novelist, author and illustrator born in India, best known for Vanity Fair.
- Ethel Sybil Turner (1870–1958), an English-born Australian novelist and writer of children's fiction.
- Percy Westerman (1875–1959), a prolific author of boys' adventure fiction, many with military and naval themes.

==== Example of self-illustration ====
Browne wrote and illustrated several books for young children using the pen name A. Nobody. The following shows an example of the simplified style he used for young children.

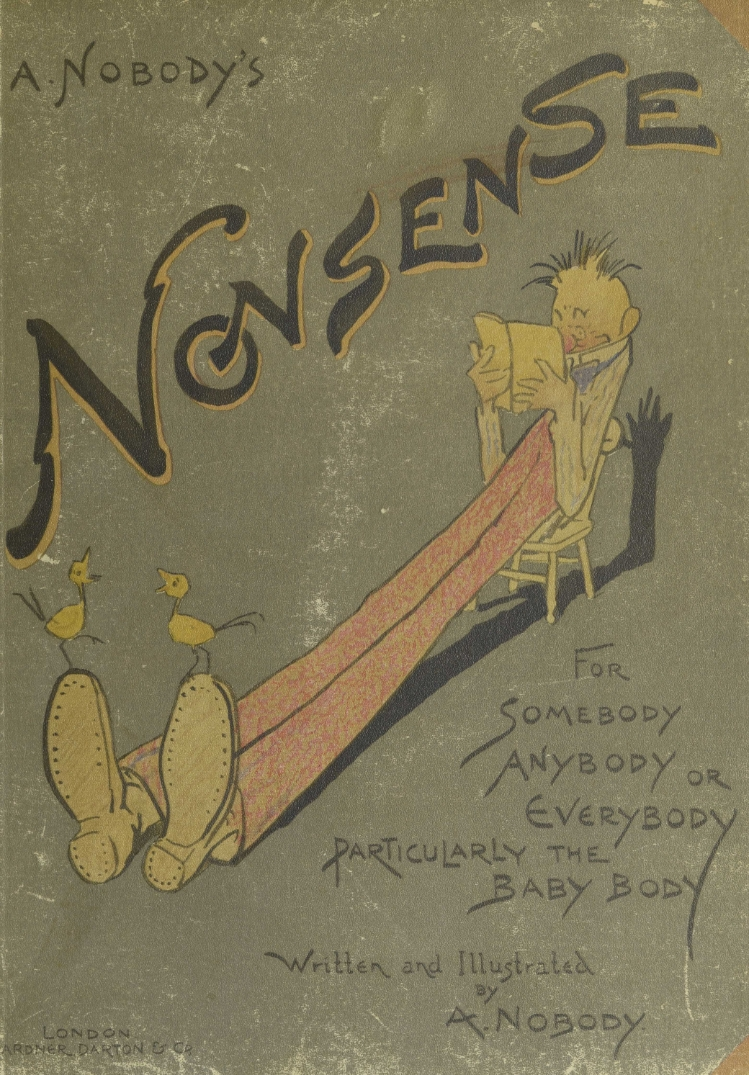
Front Cover

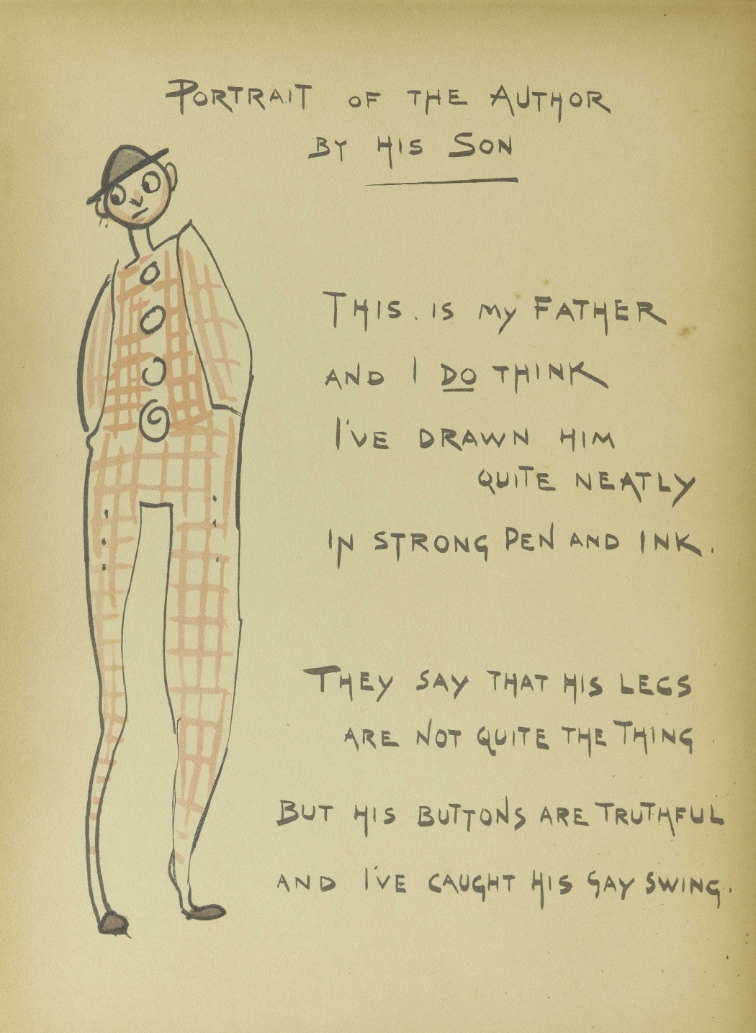
Frontispiece

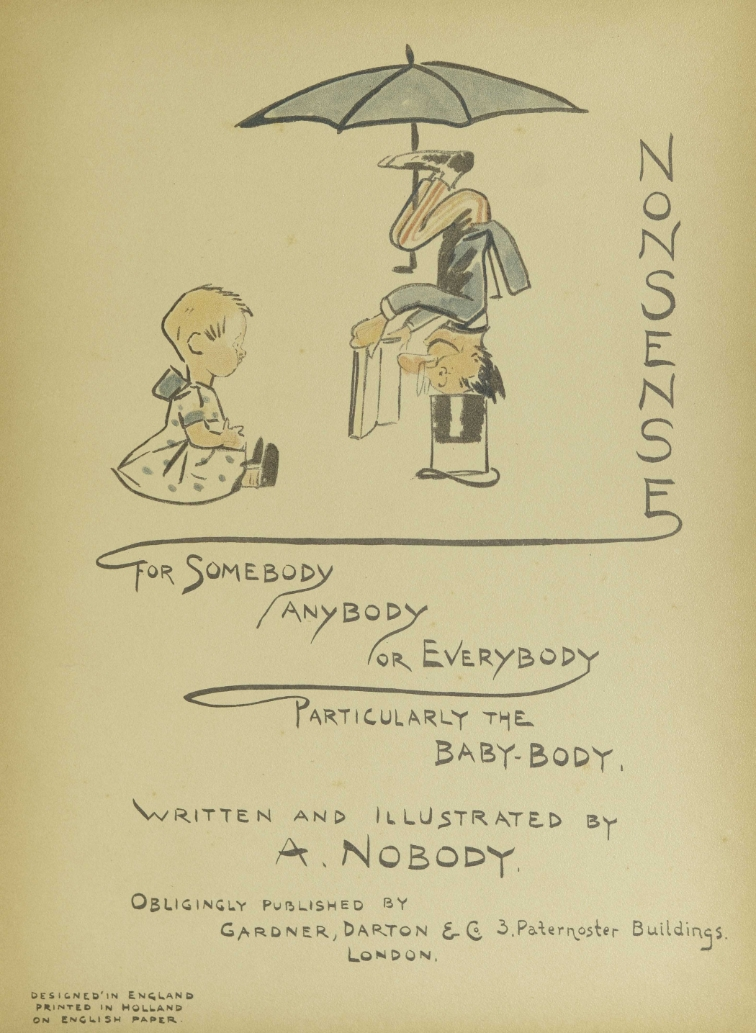
Title page

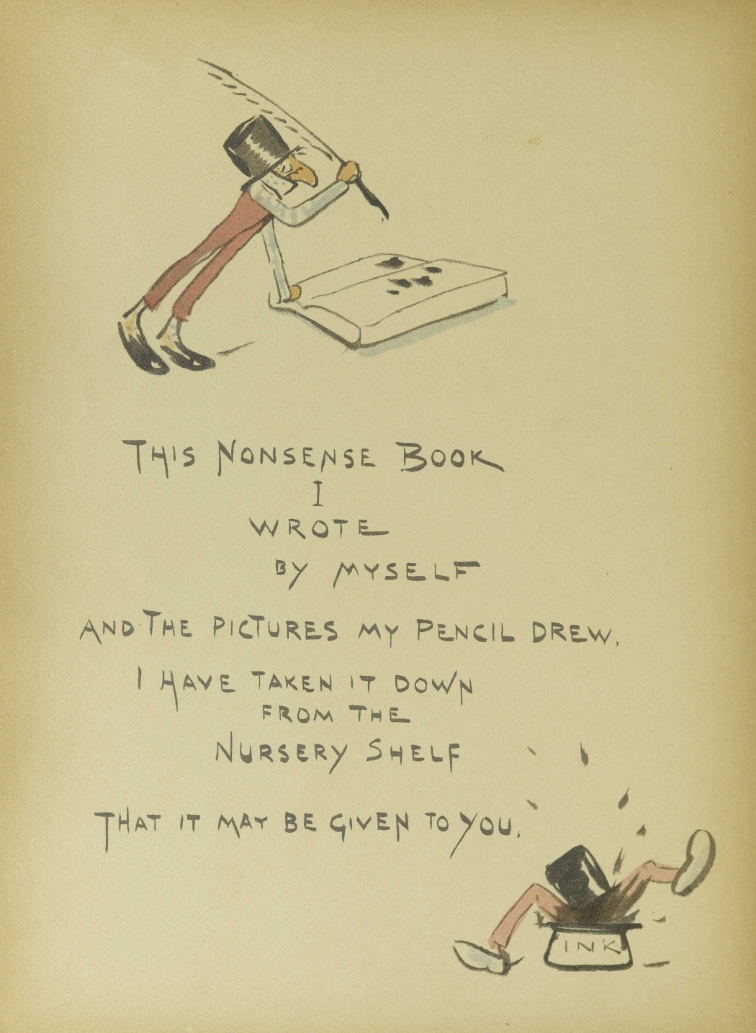
Page 1

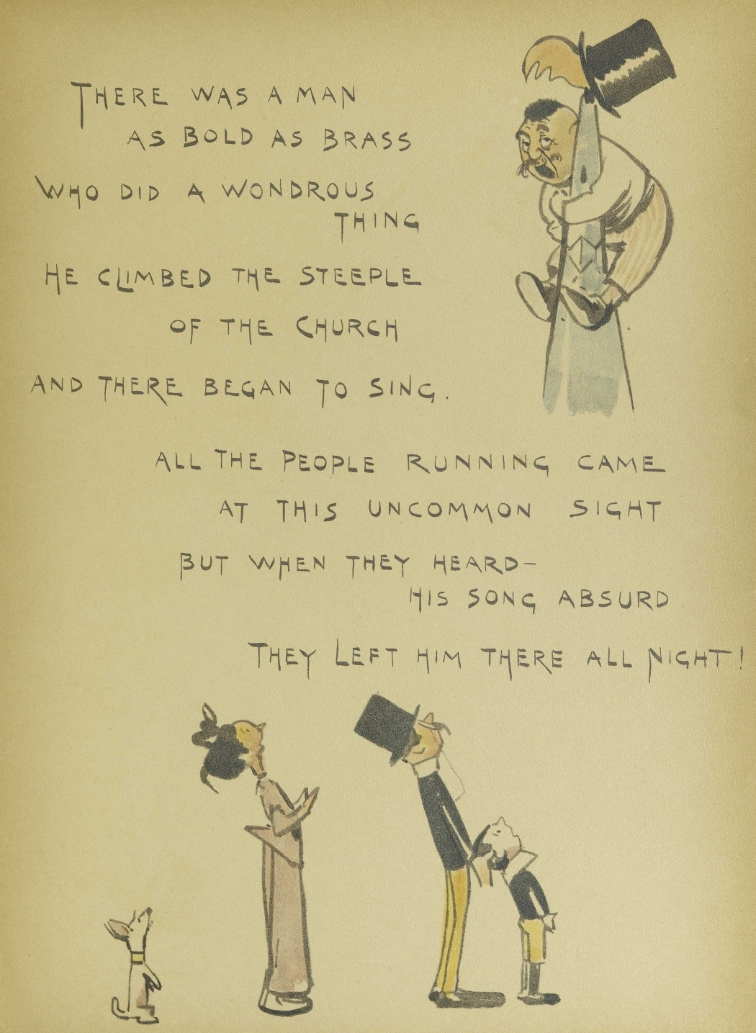
Page 2

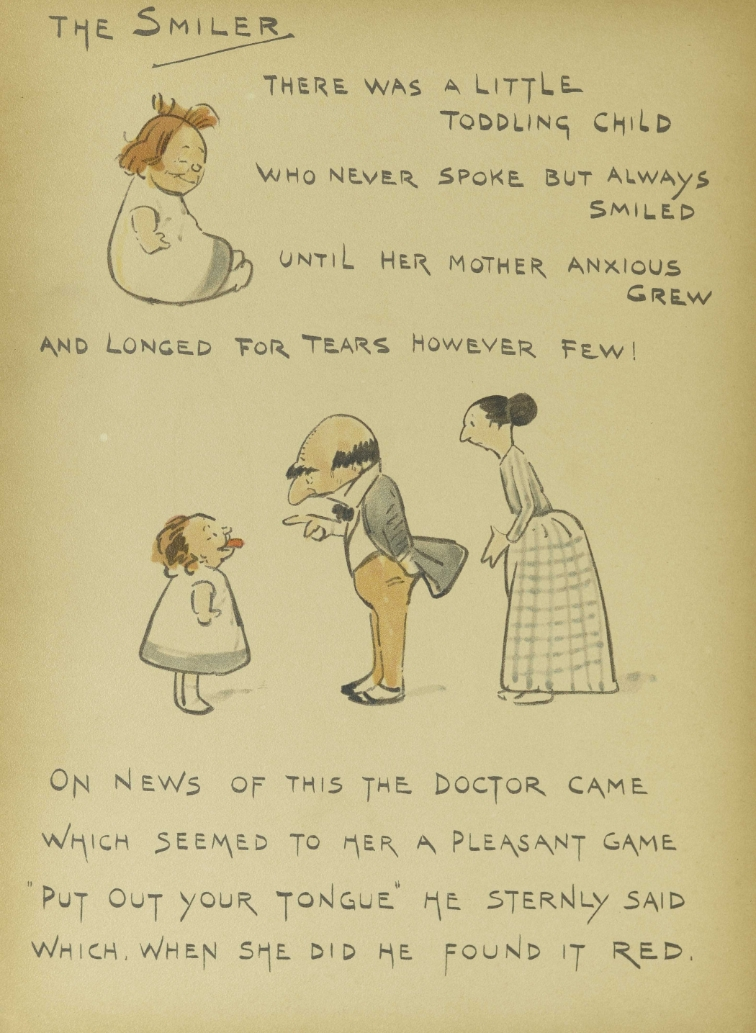
Page 3

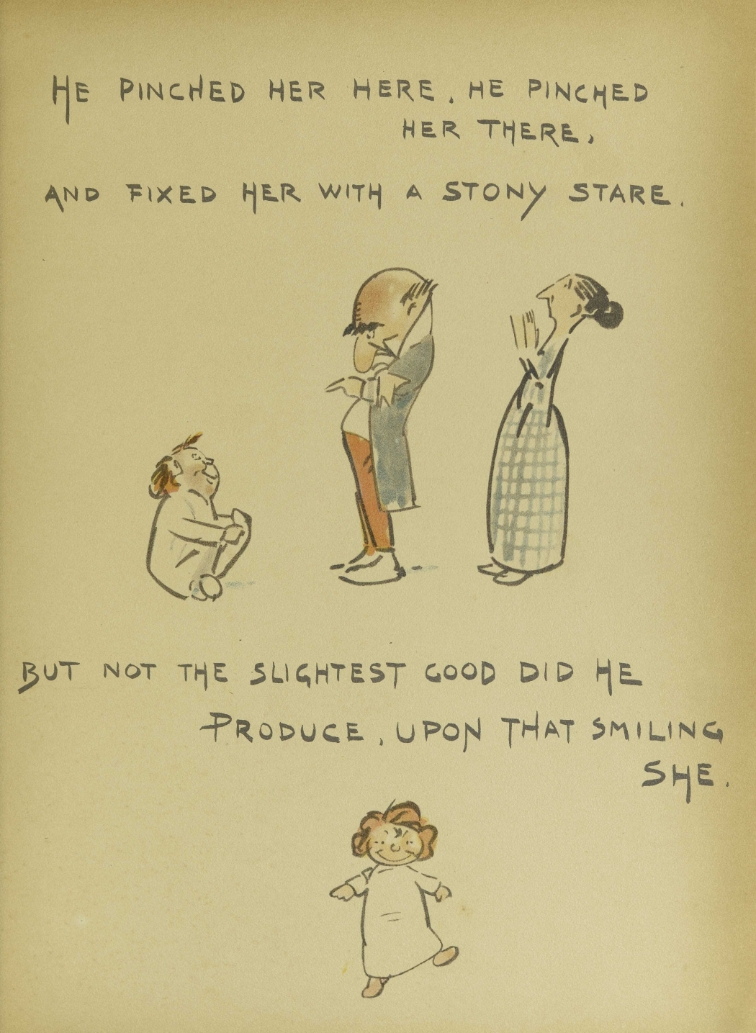
Page 4

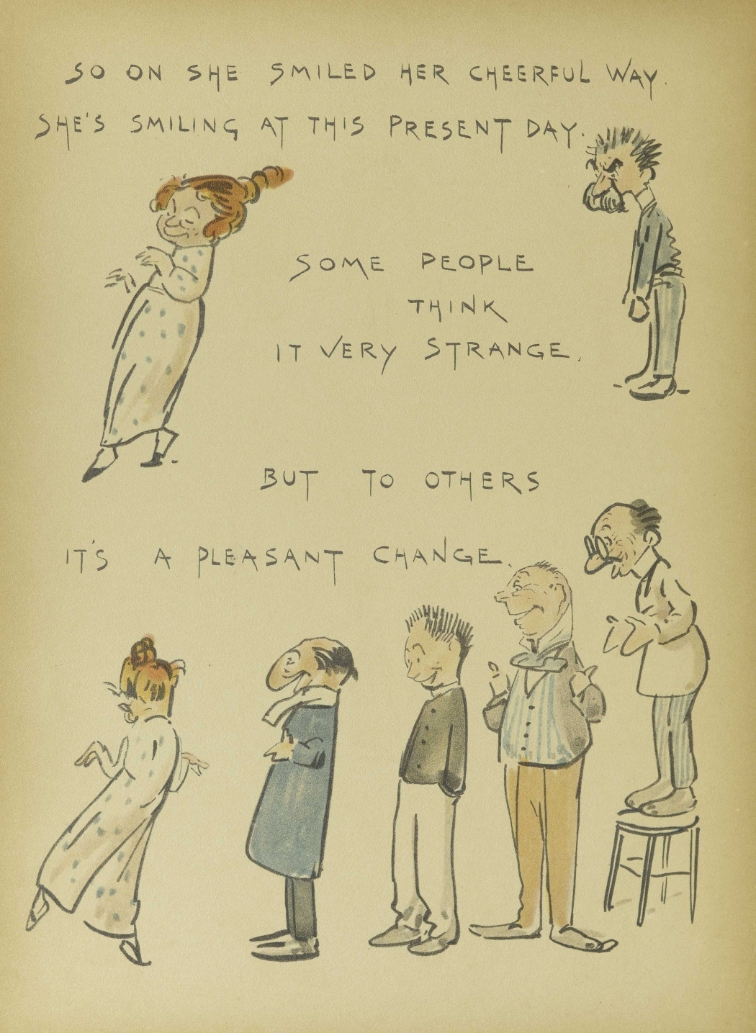
Page 5

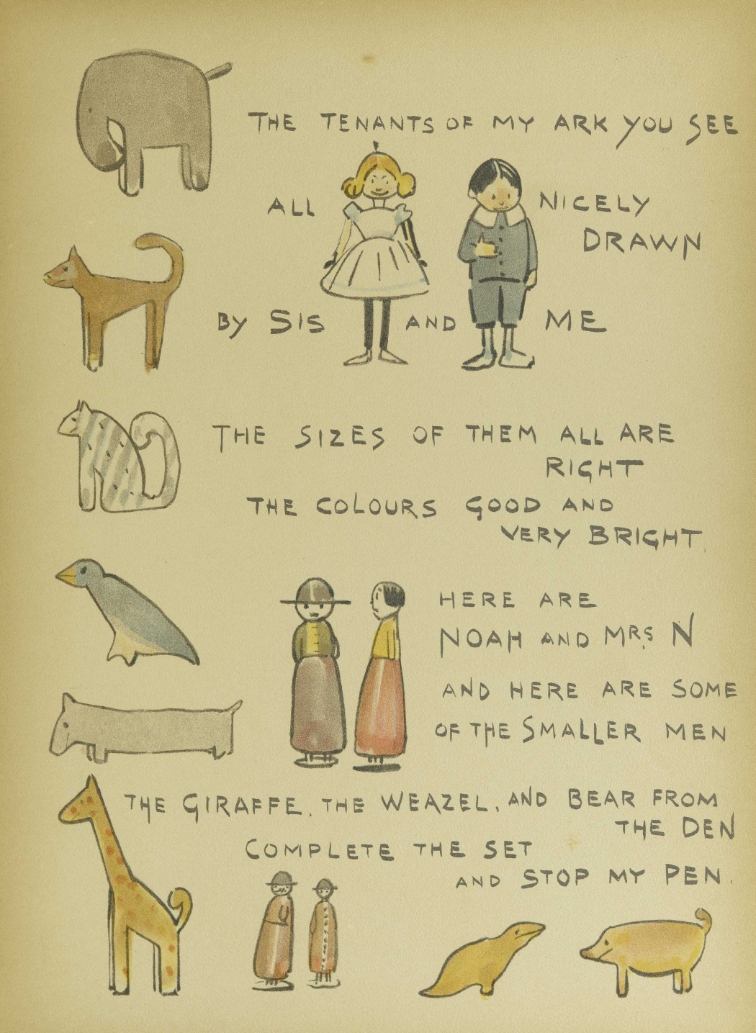
Page 6

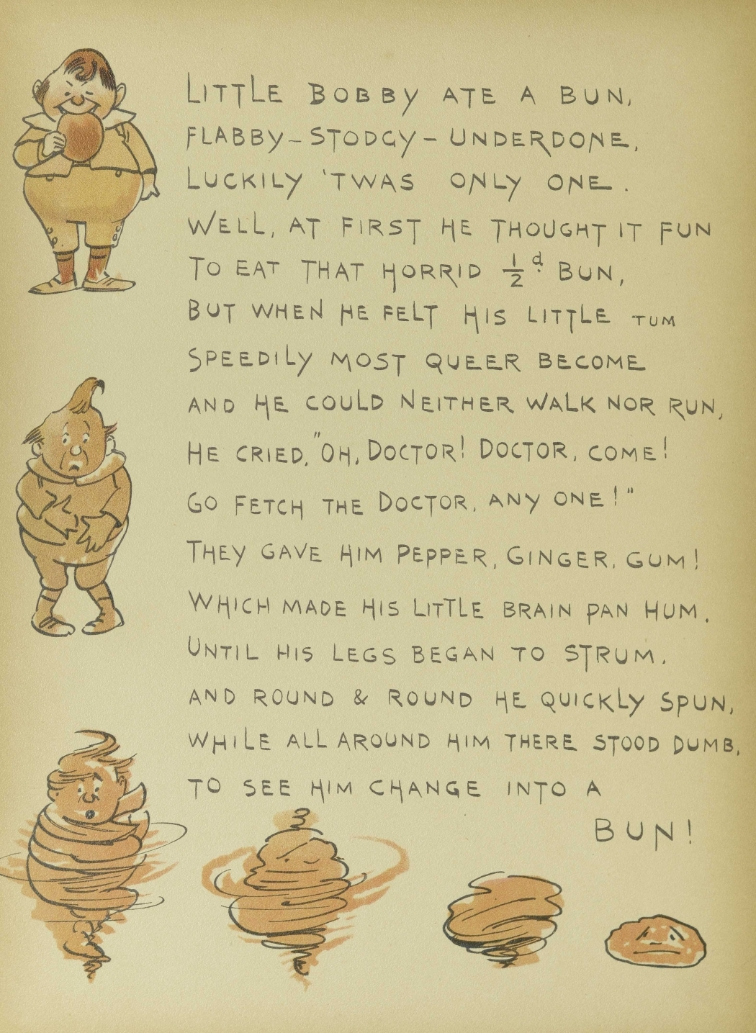
Page 7

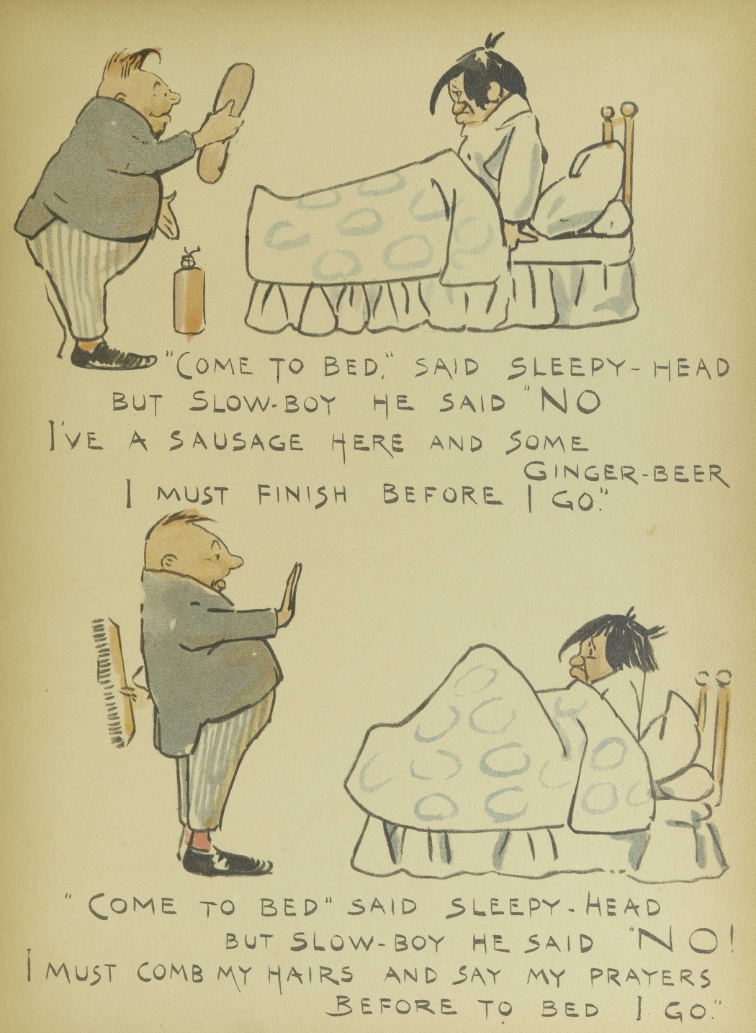
Page 8

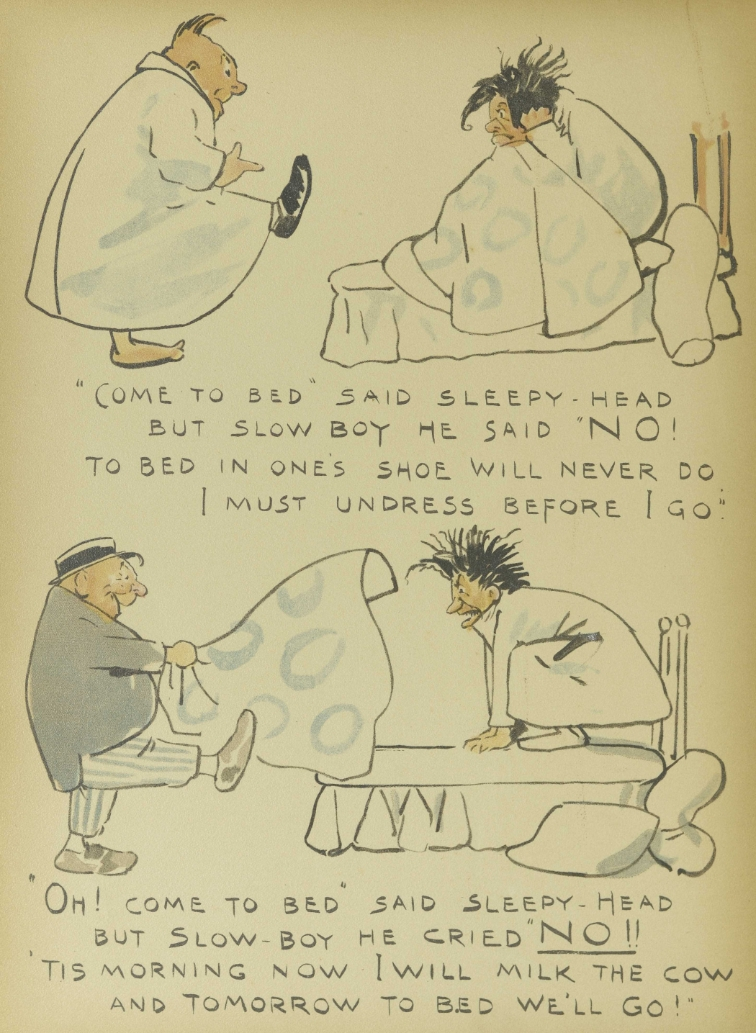
Page 9

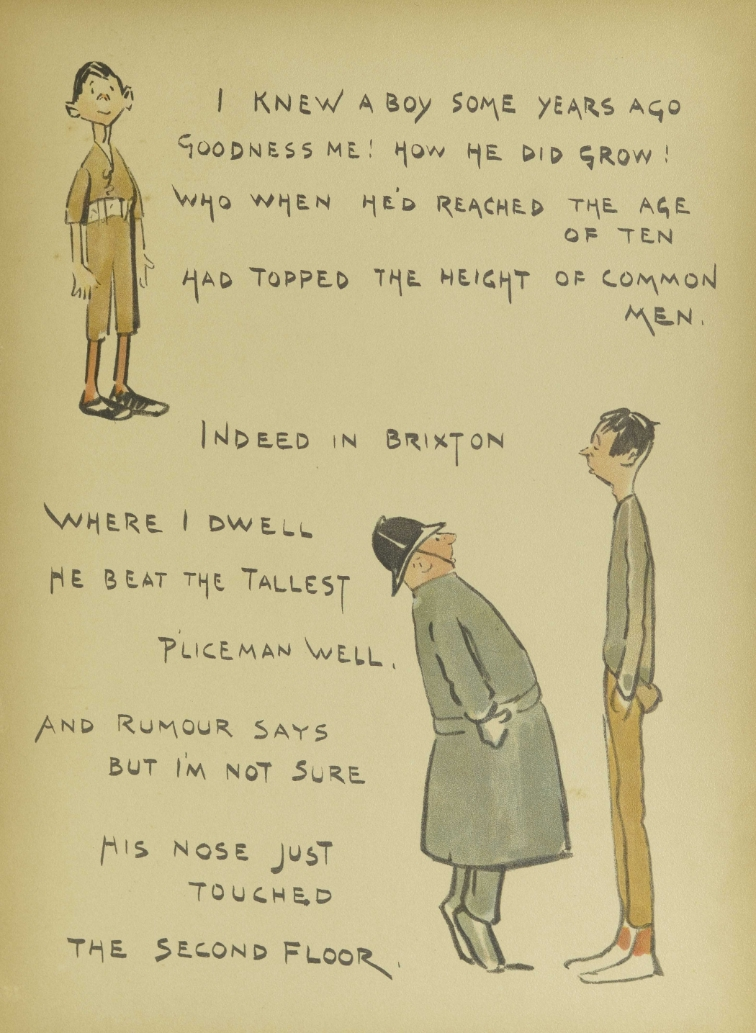
Page 10

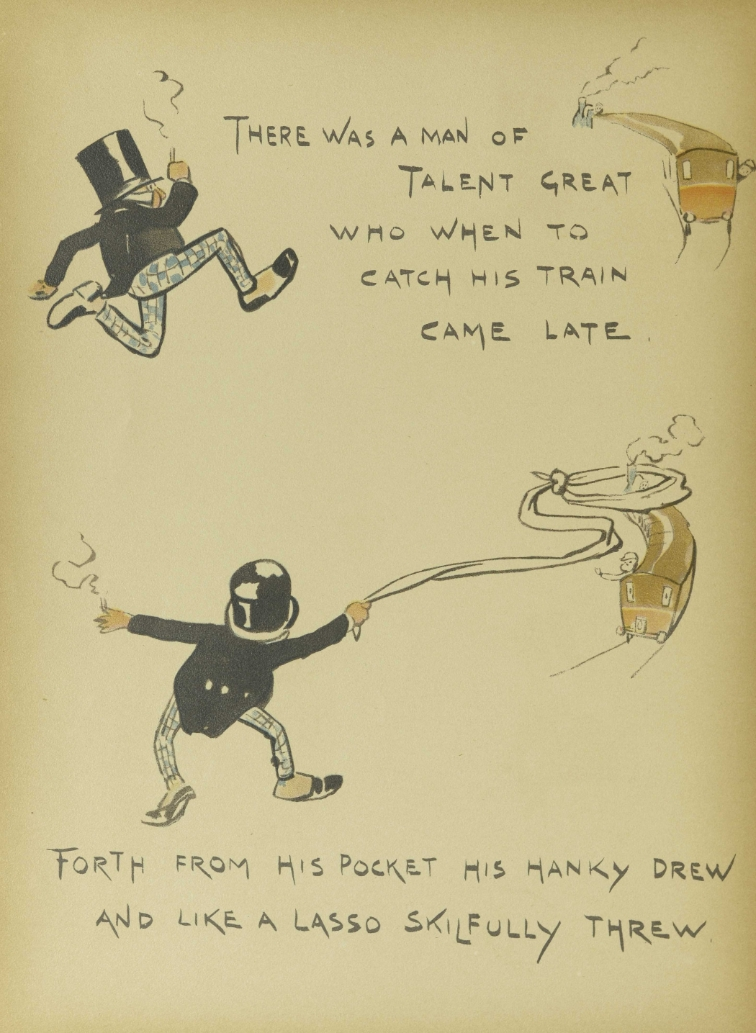
Page 11

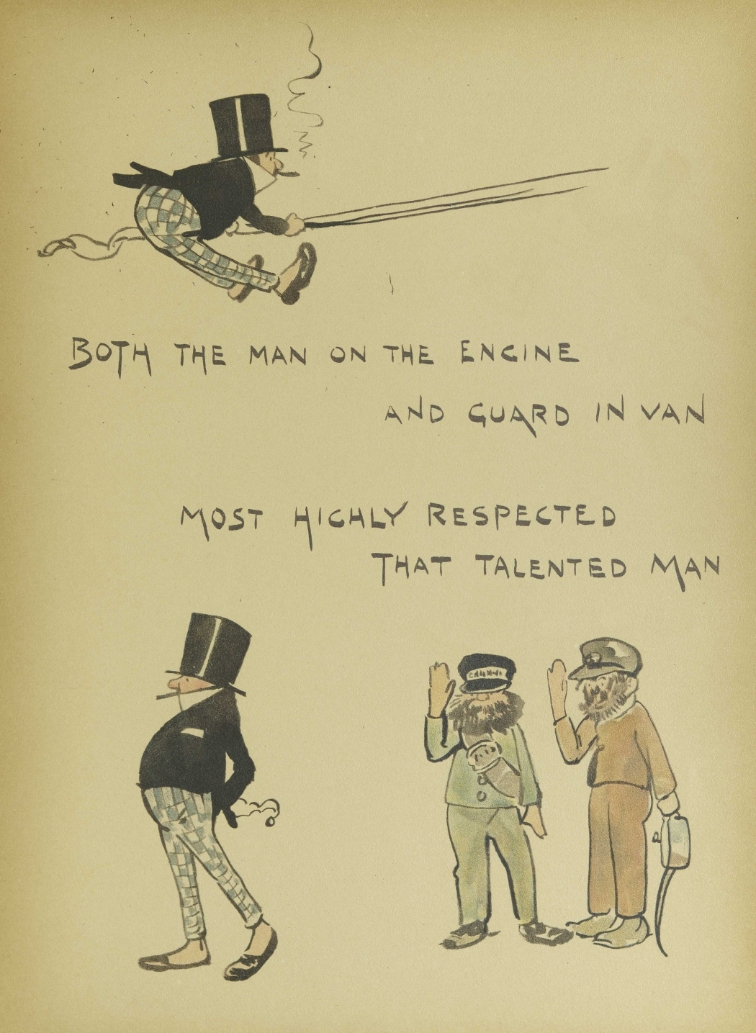
Page 12

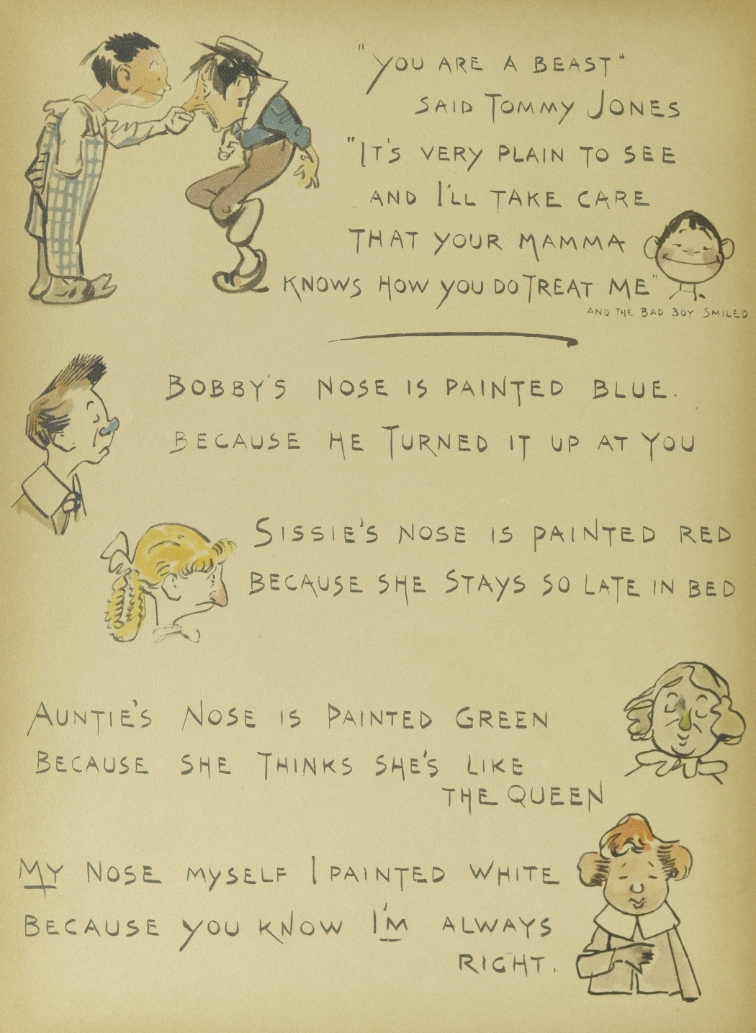
Page 13

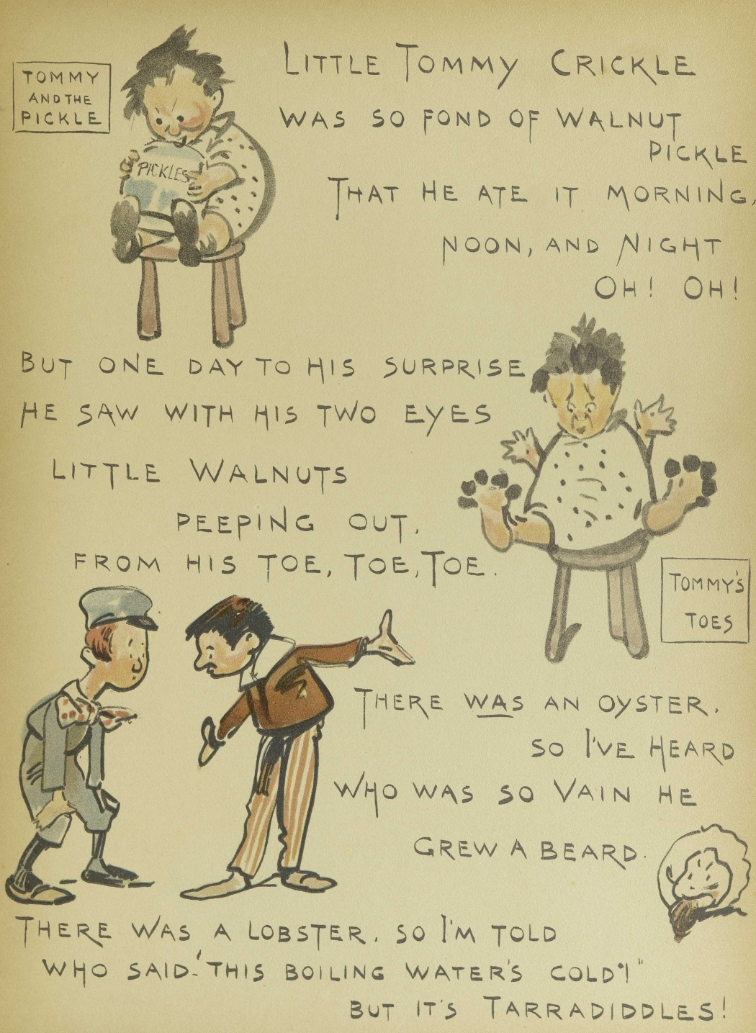
Page 14

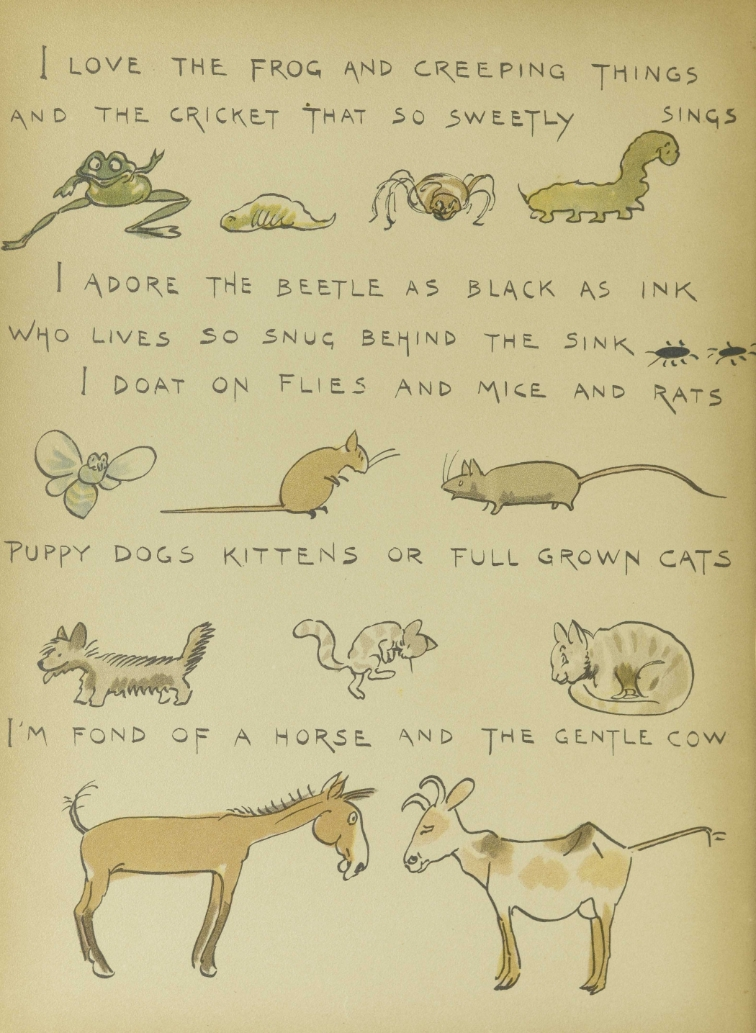
Page 15

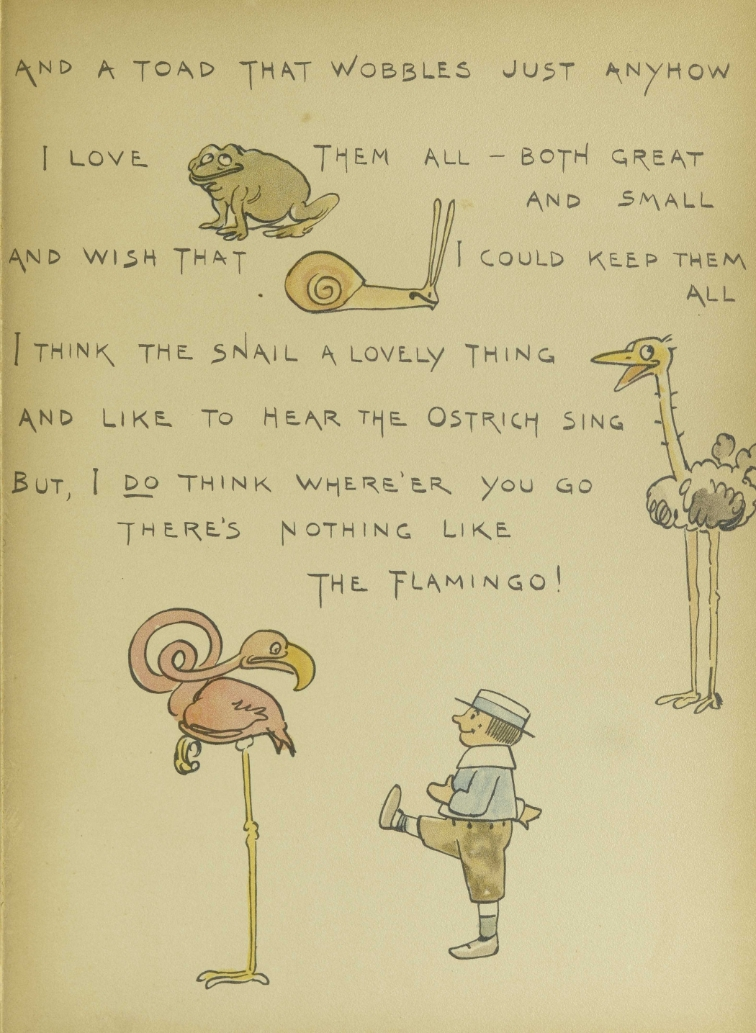
Page 16

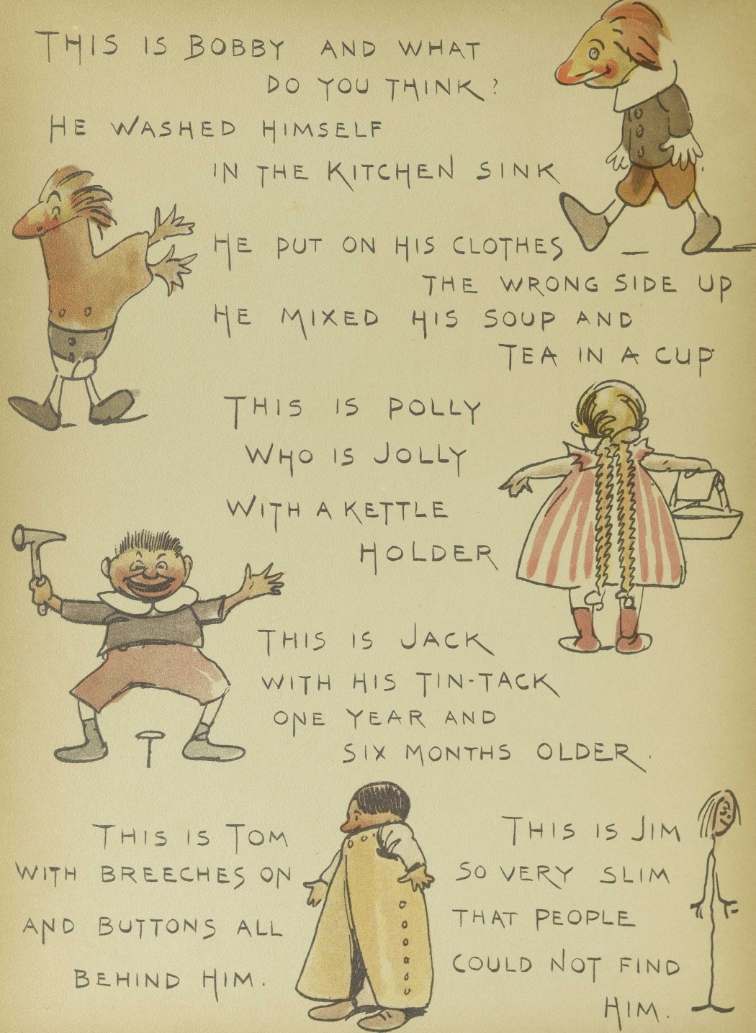
Page 17

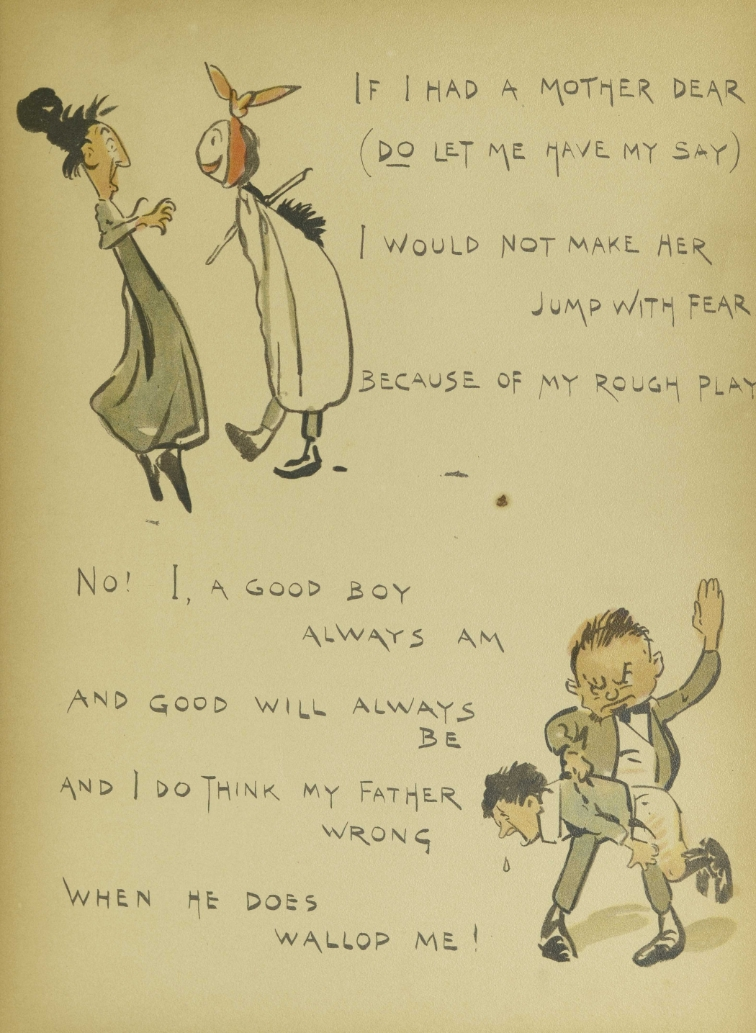
Page 18

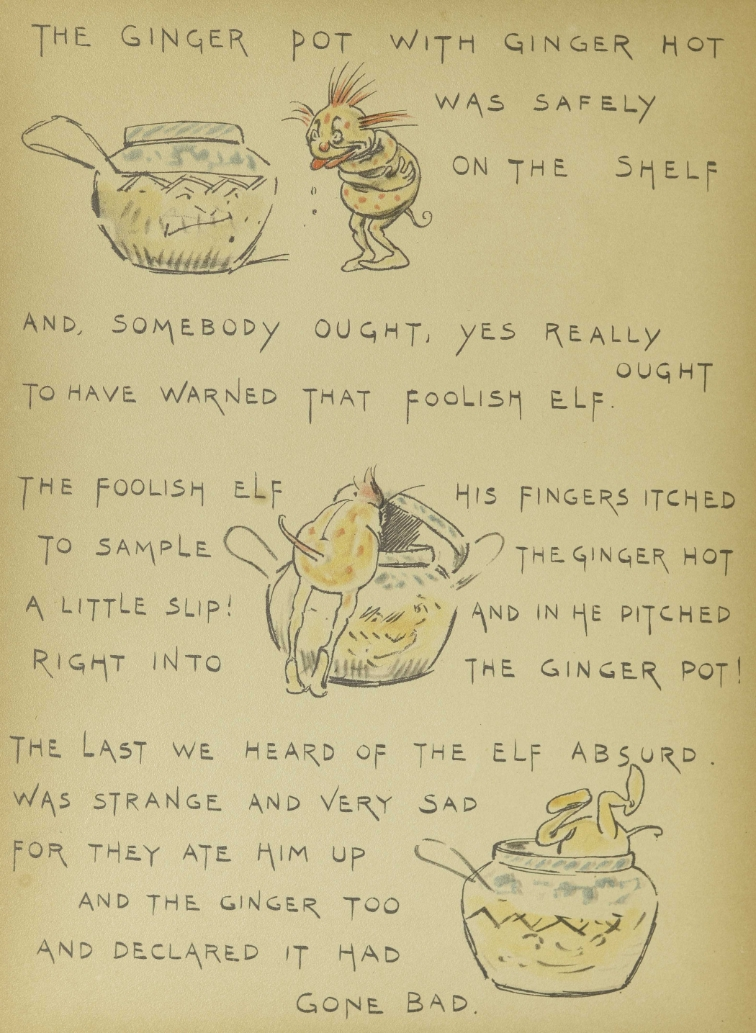
Page 19

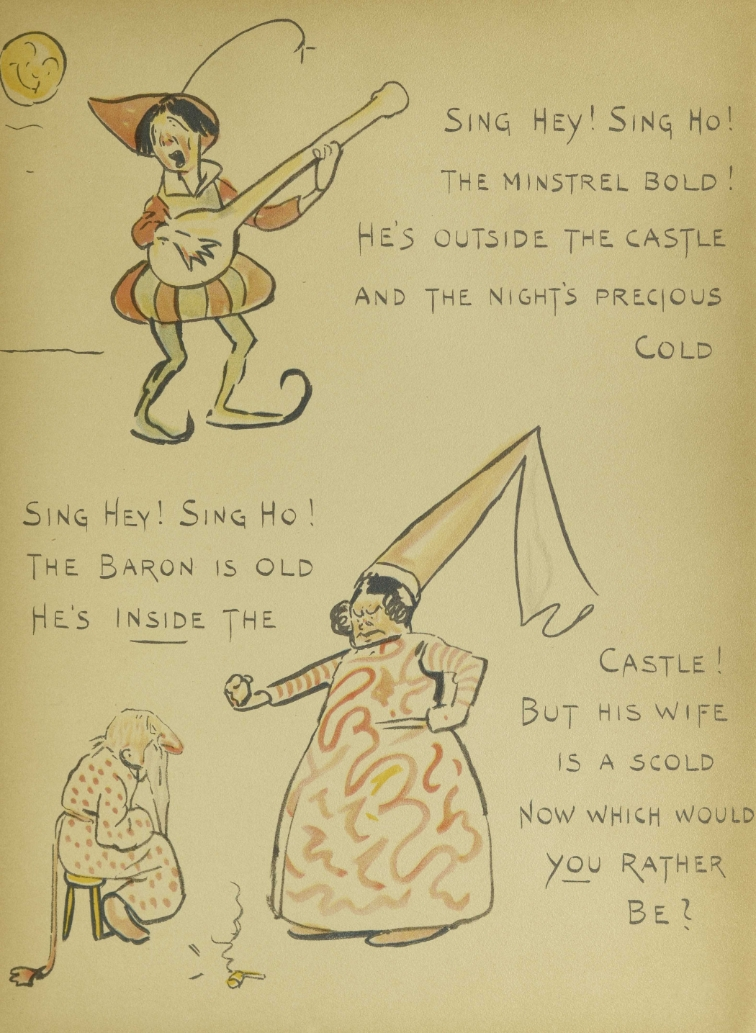
Page 20

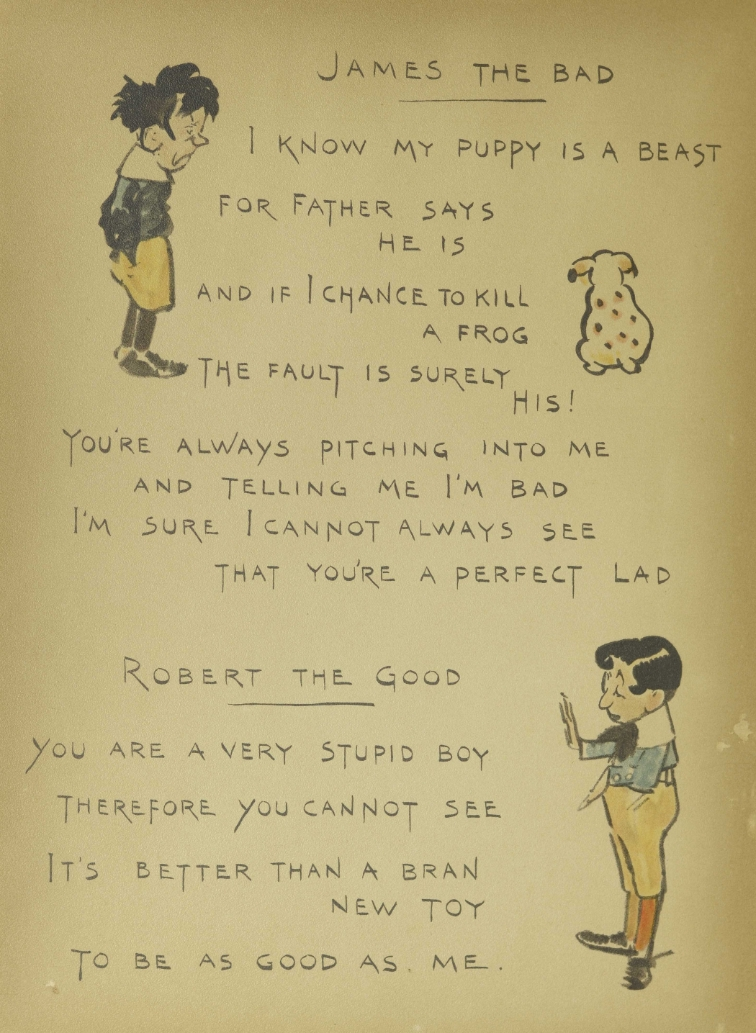
Page 21

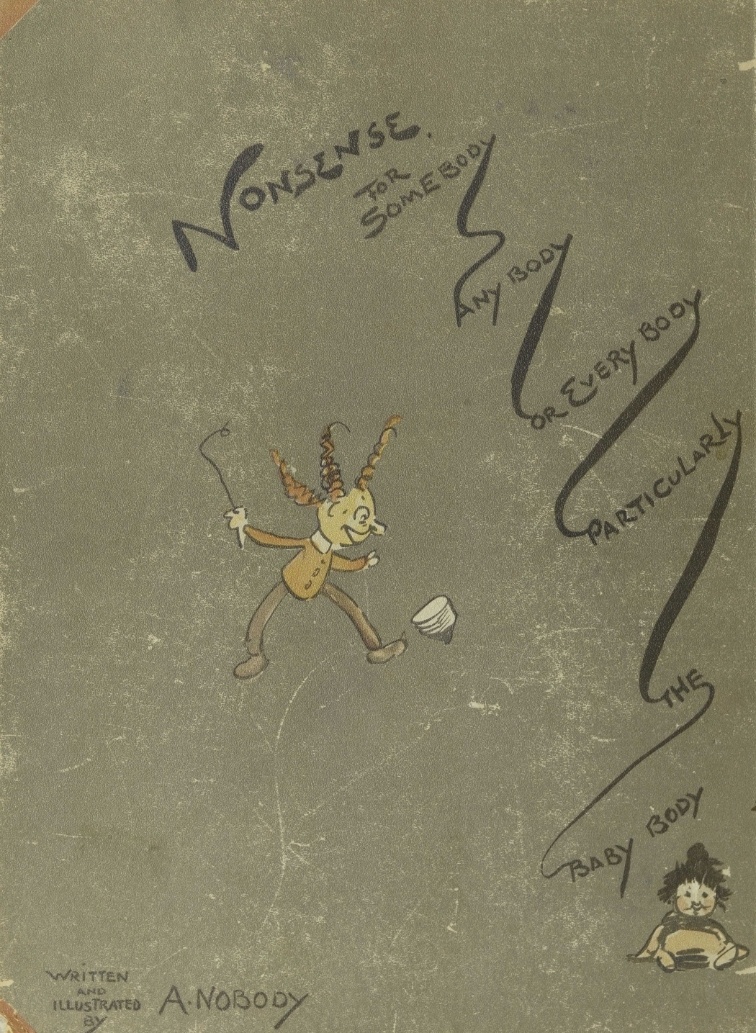
Back Cover

=== Magazine Illustration ===
Browne illustrated for many magazines. The following list is based on page 79 of Kirkpatrick, the source is indicated where names have been drawn from other sources:

- Andy
- Atalanta
- Aunt Judy's Magazine
- The Badminton Magazine
- Black and White
- The Boy's Own Paper
- The British Workman
- The Captain
- Cassell's Family Magazine
- Cassell's Saturday Journal
- The Children's Friend
- Chums
- The English Illustrated Magazine
- Darton's Leading Strings
- Every Boy's Magazine
- Every Girl's Magazine
- The Girl's Own Paper
- The Girl's Realm
- Good Words
- The Graphic
- Herbert Strang's Annual
- The Illustrated London News
- The Illustrated Sporting and Dramatic News
- The Infants' Magazine
- The Jarvey
- The Jabberwock
- The Leisure Hour
- Lika Joko
- Little Folks
- Little Wide-Awake
- The London Magazine
- The New Budget
- The New Magazine
- Our Own Magazine
- The New Penny Magazine
- The Pall Mall Magazine
- Puck
- Punch
- The Quiver
- The Red Magazine
- The Royal Magazine
- The Scout
- The Sphere
- The Strand Magazine
- Sunday at Home
- The Sunday Magazine
- Sunday Reading for the Young
- The Sunday Strand
- The Union Jack
- The Woman's World
- The Yellow Magazine
- Young Britain
- Young England
- The Young Man and the Young Woman

==== Example of magazine illustration ====
The following example of magazine illustration shows the scale of work involved in illustrating even a single serial story. The Sorceress of the Strand by L T Meade and Robert Eustace appeared as a serial in the Strand Magazine volumes 24 and 25 in 1902 – 1903. It was copiously illustrated by Browne.

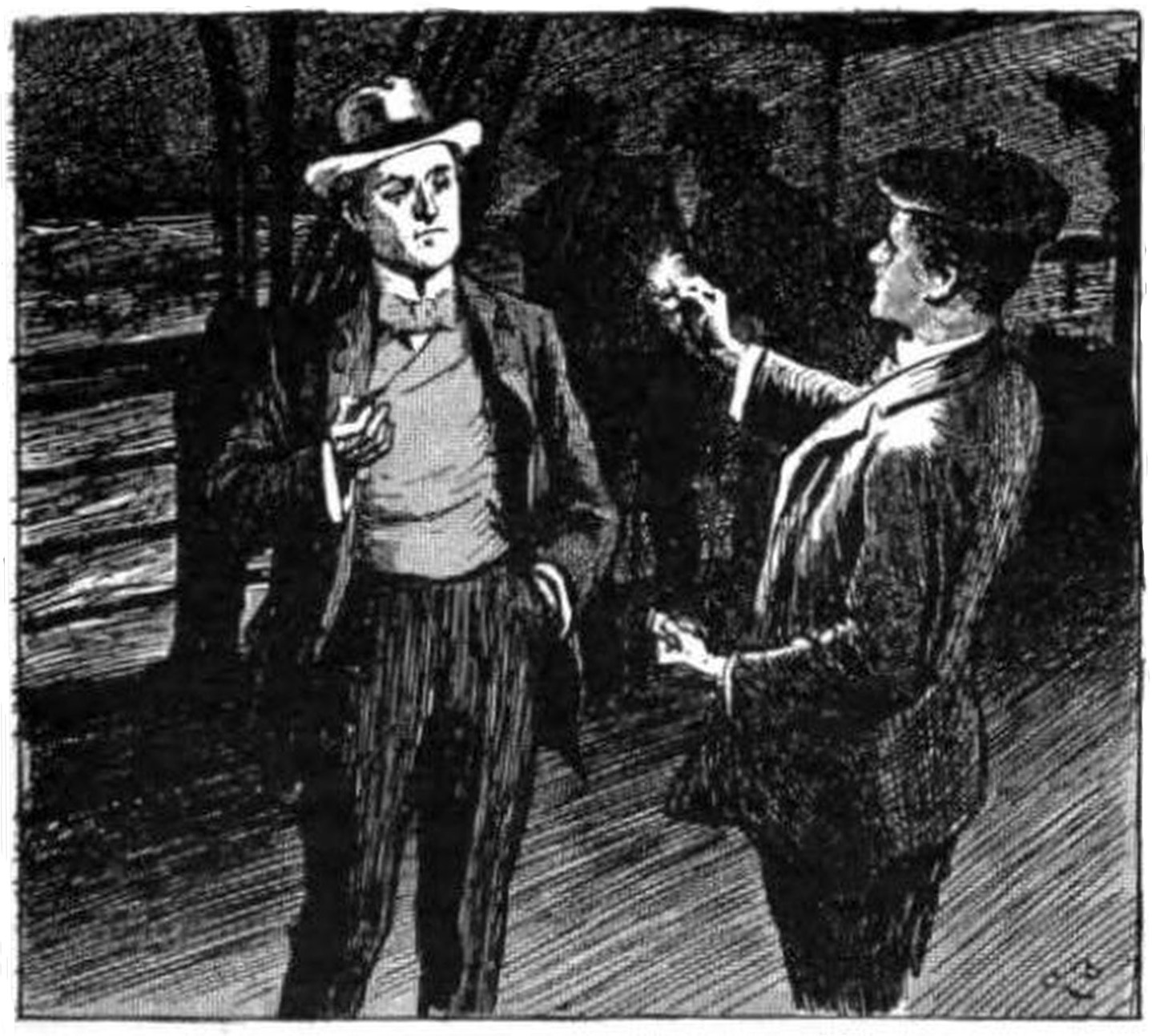
Do you want a match, sir?

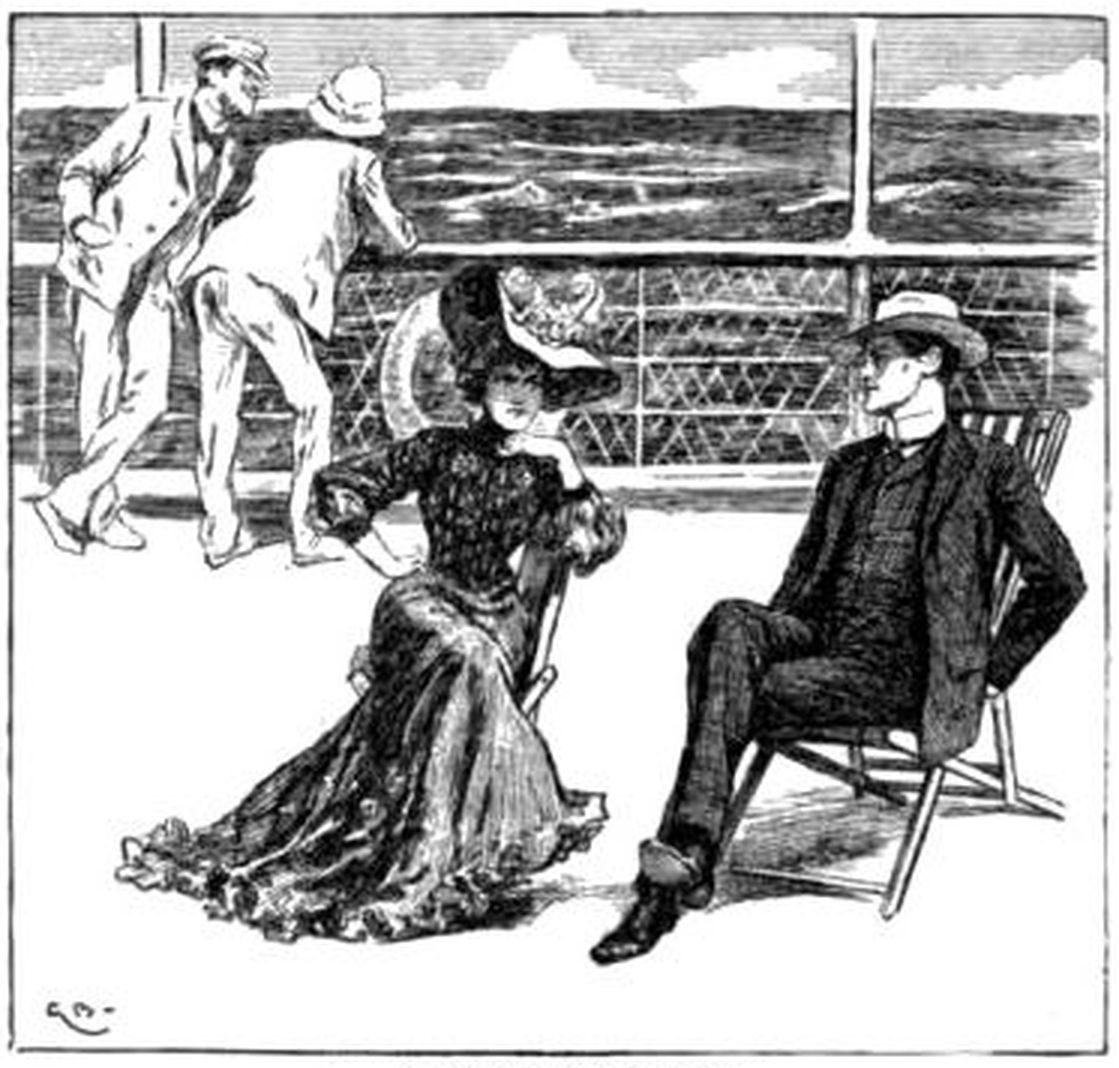
I am a beautifier

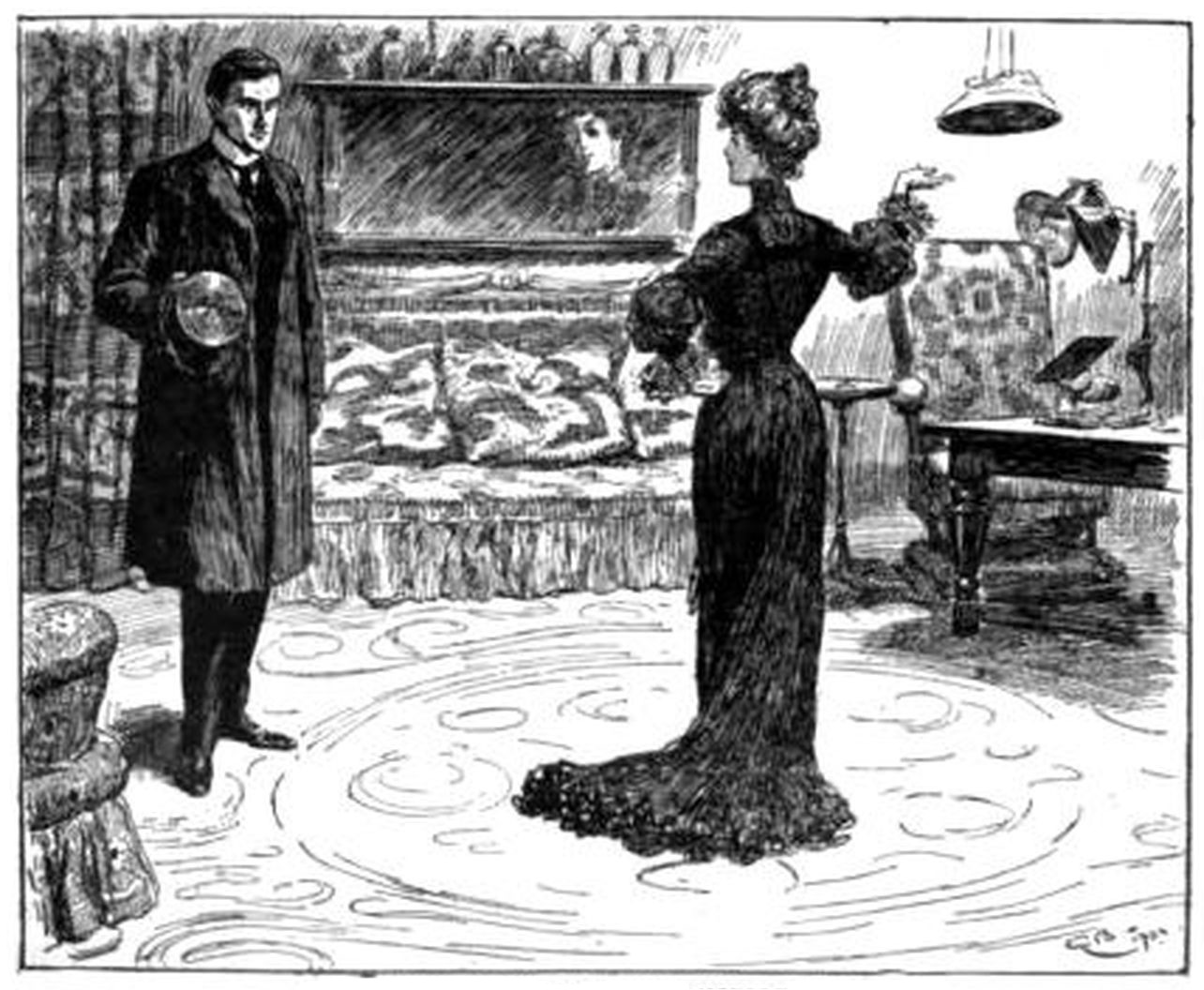
This is my sanctum sanctorum

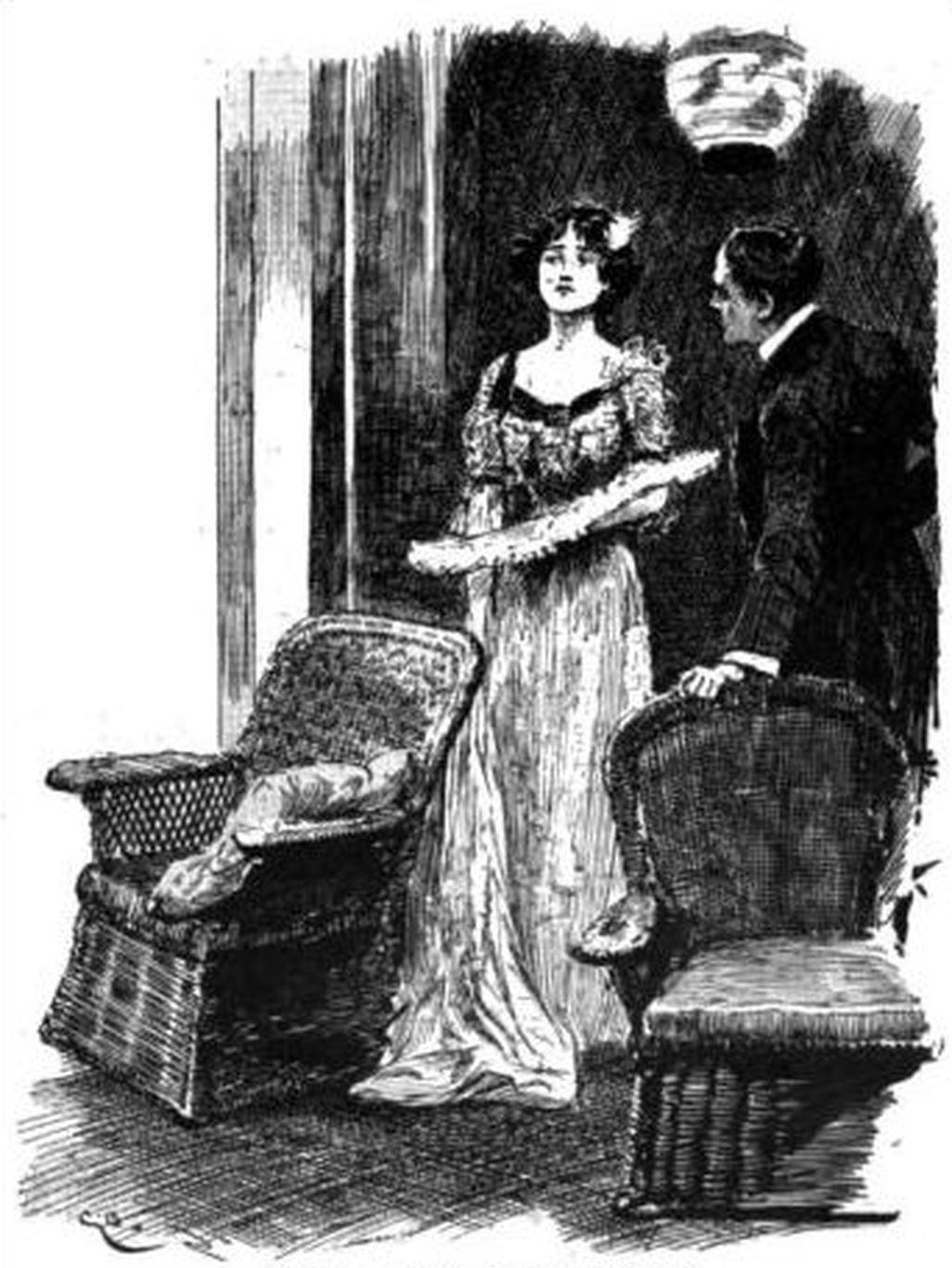
Why are you afraid of her

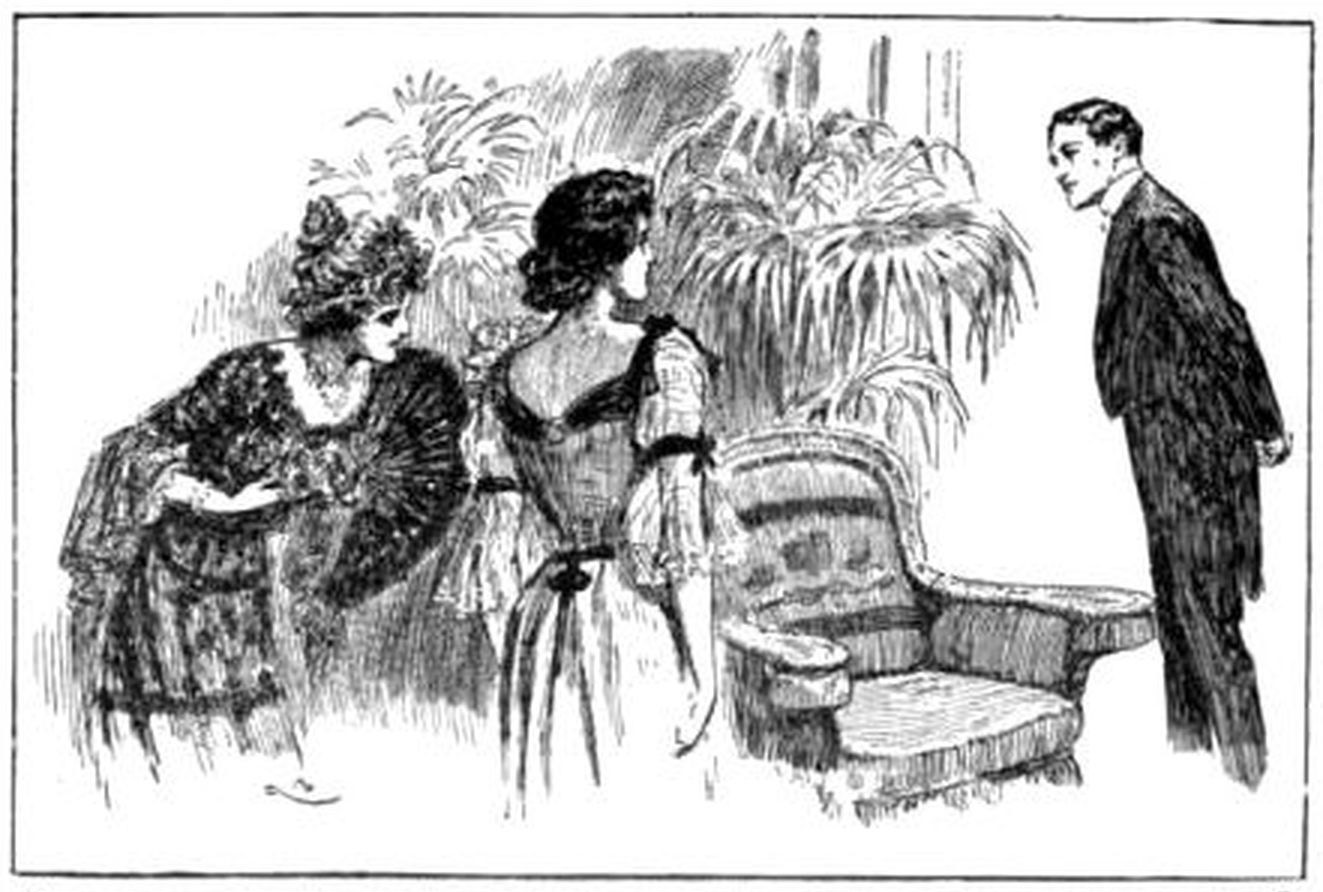
She bowed, and the peculiar look she had before given me flashed over her face

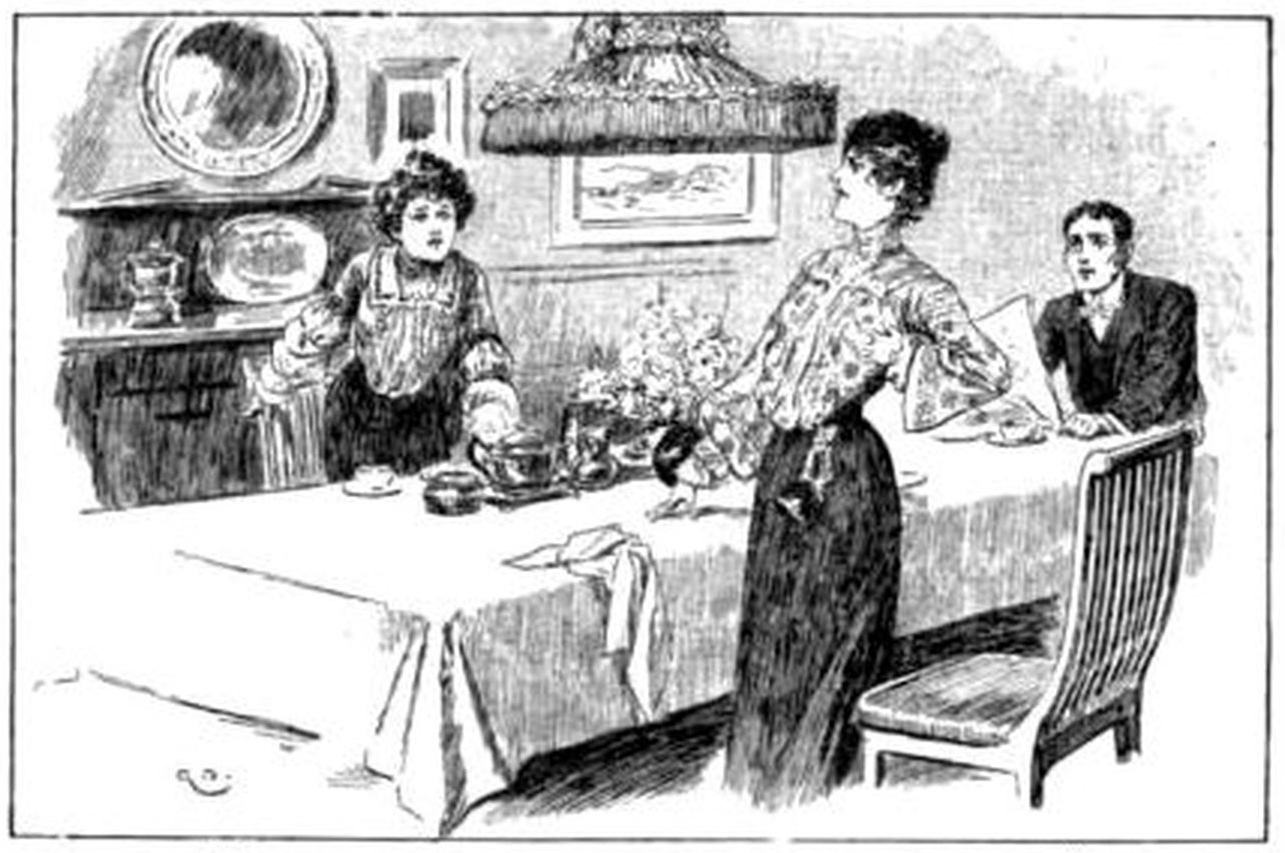
She jumped up from the table

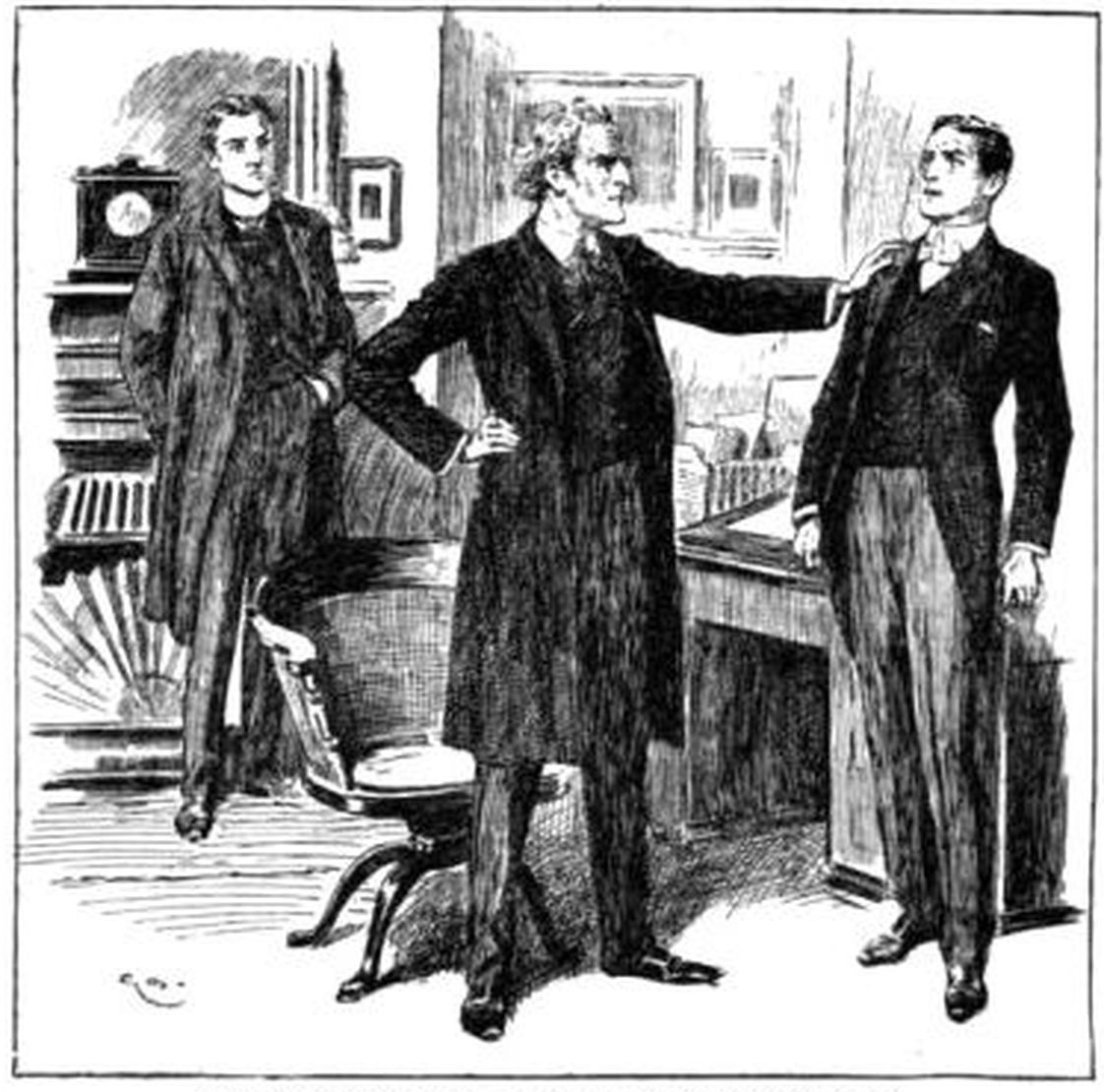
I counsel you, Mr. Selby, to guard your life

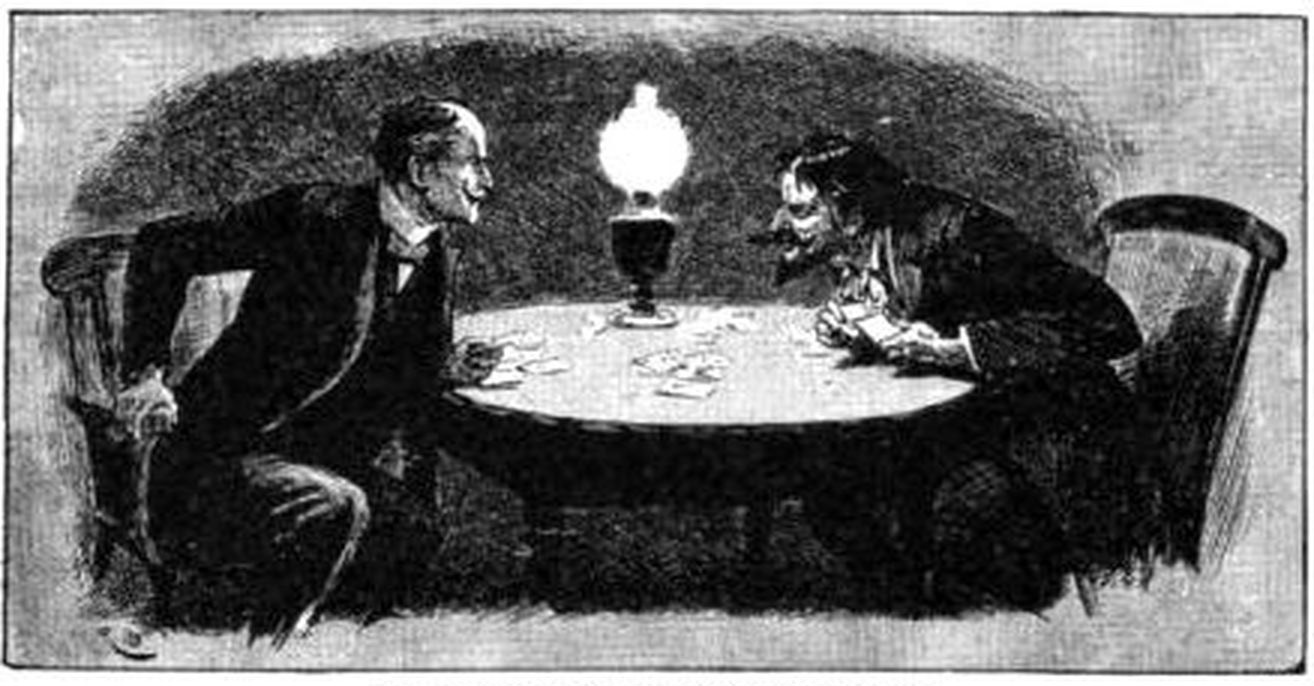
I had lost to him nearly £200,000!

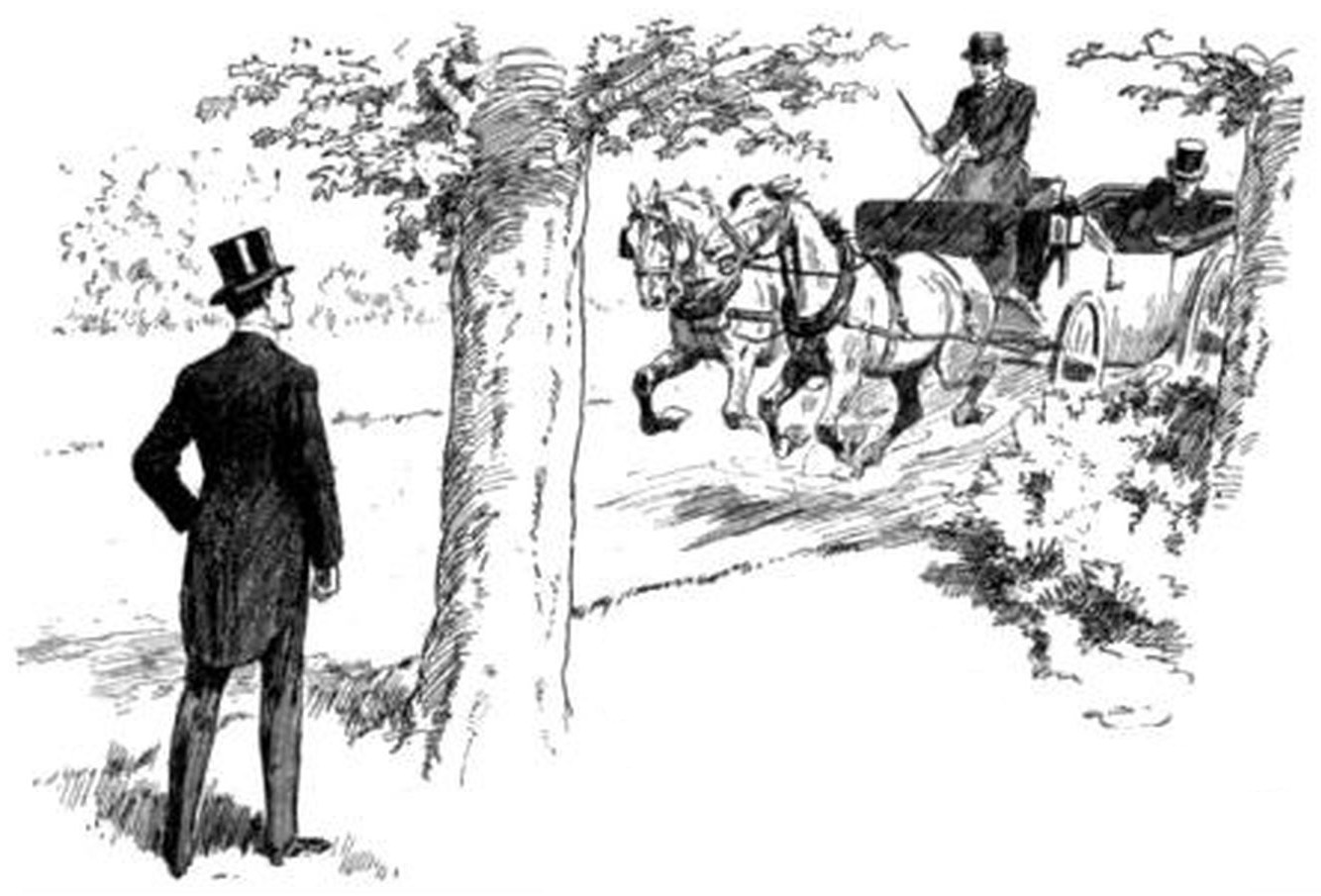
Vandeleur in an open fly dashed through

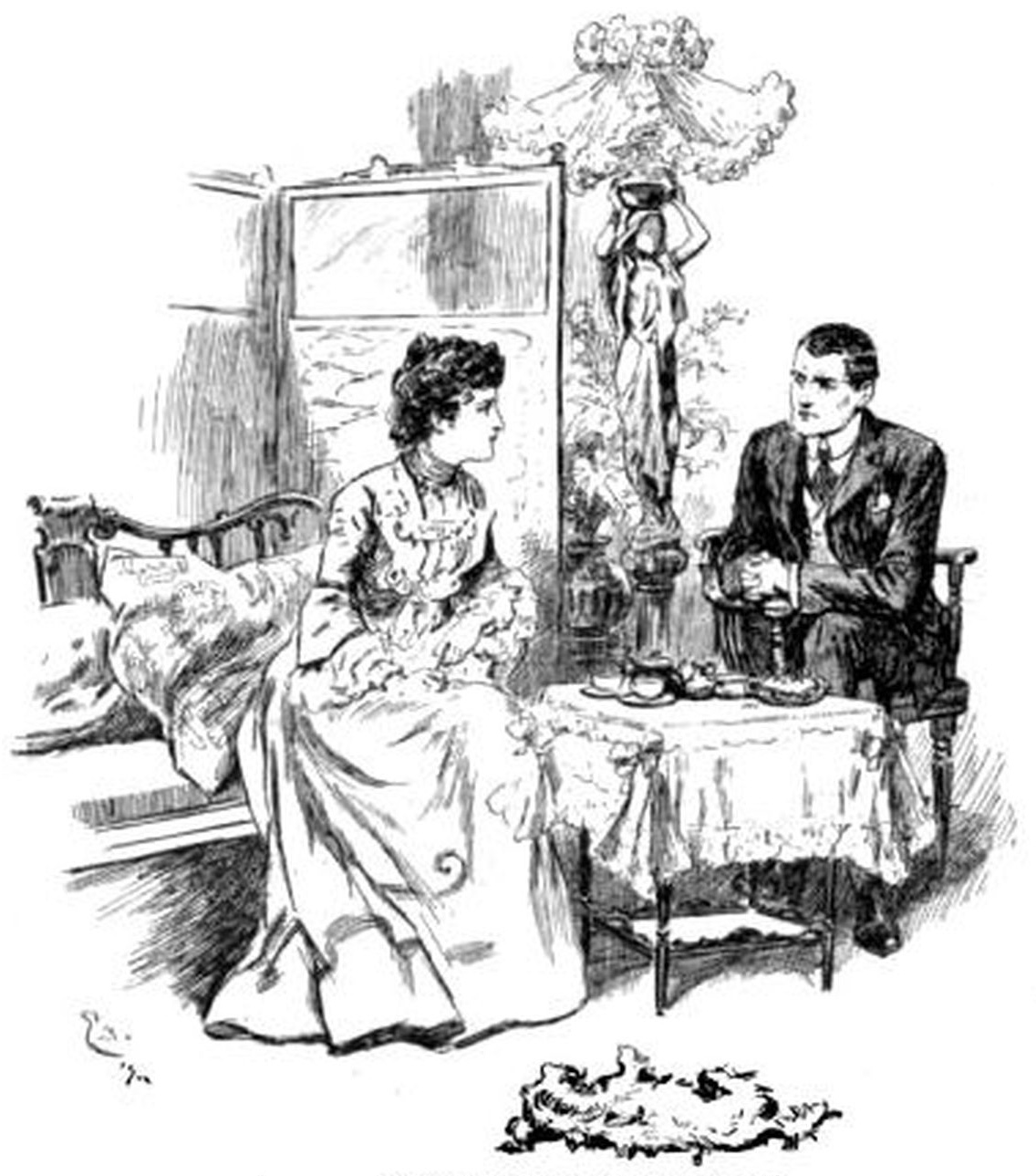
Lady Kennedy told me all about it

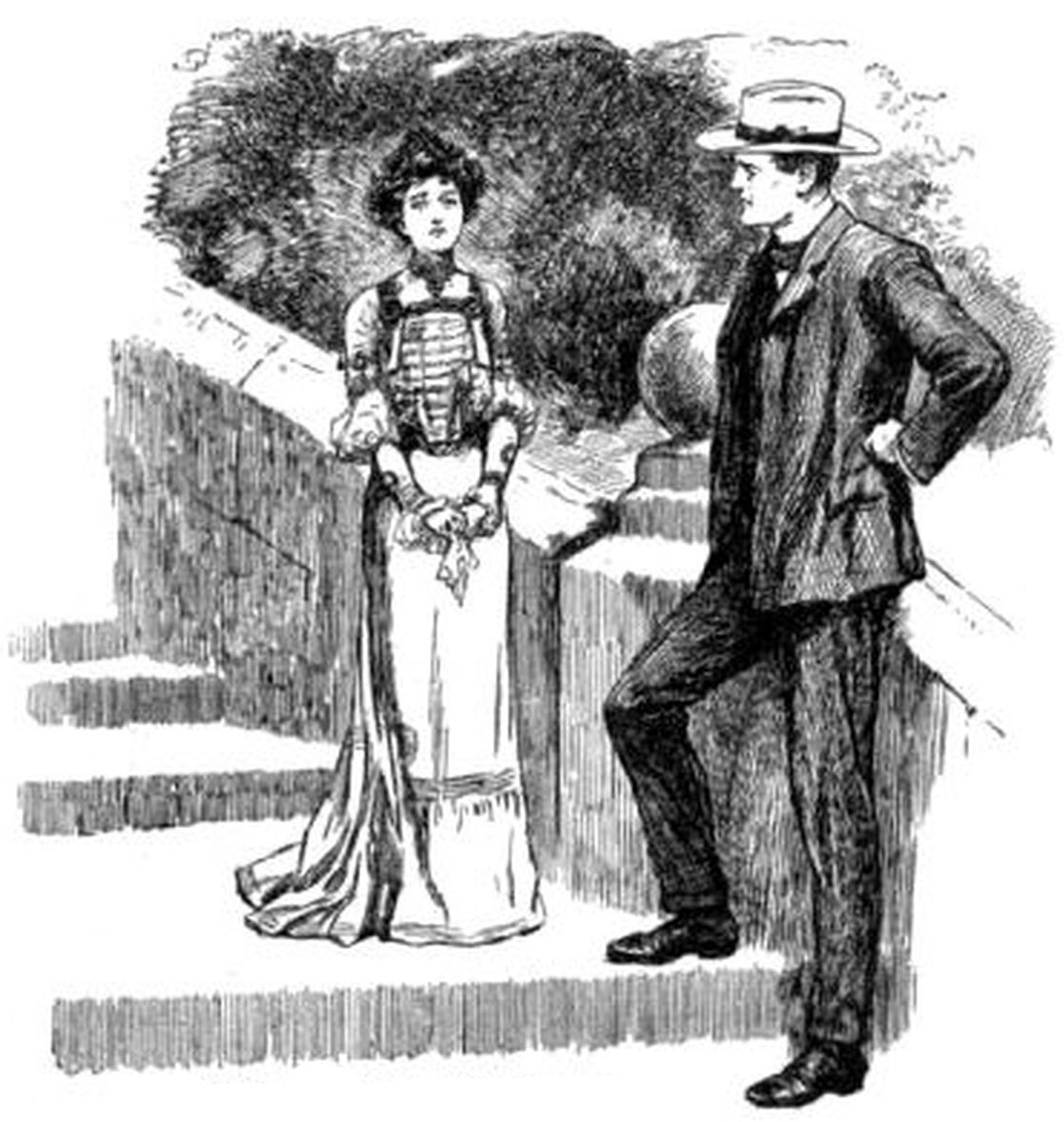
It must be done

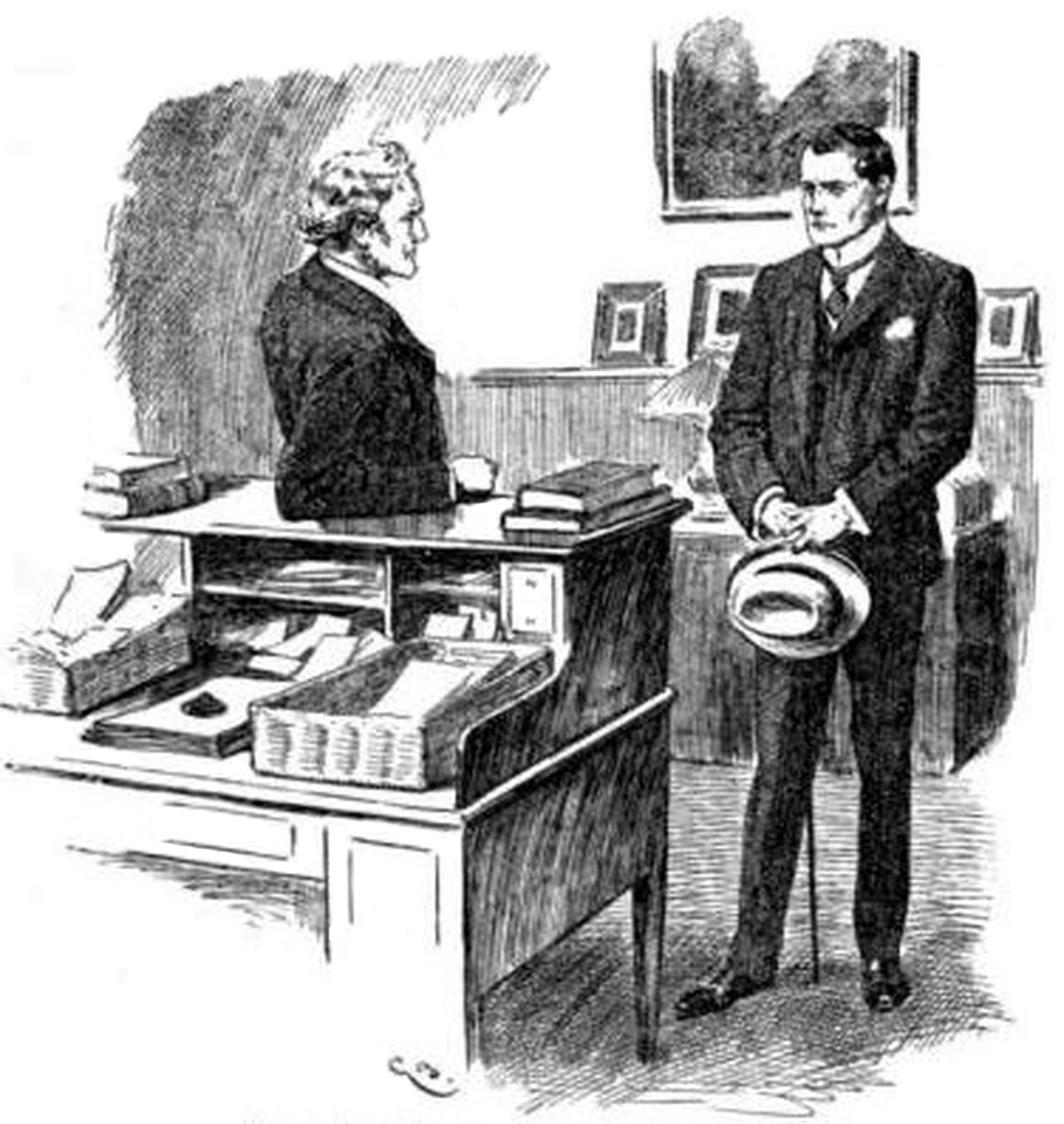
She is preparing to convulse society

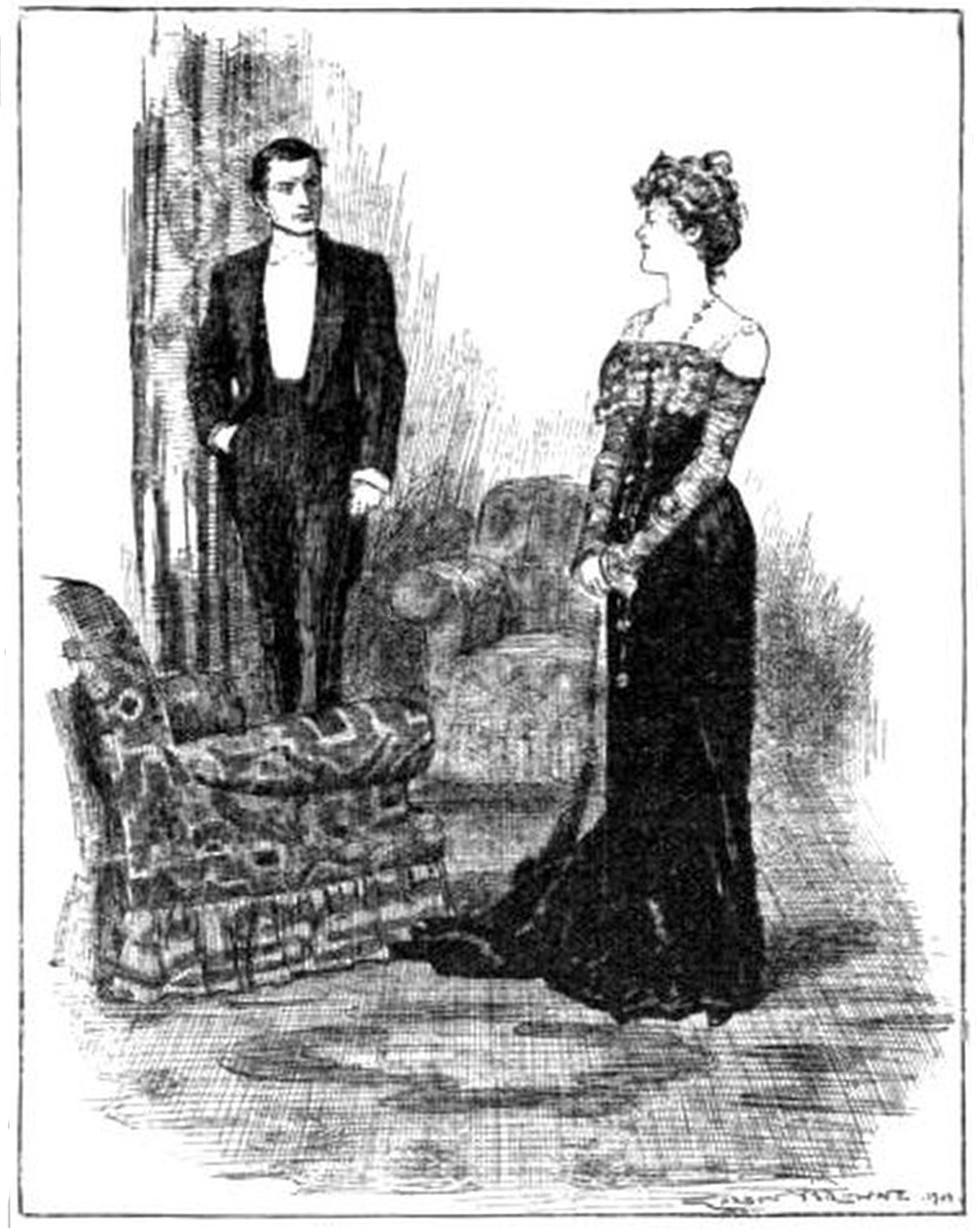
Forewarned is forearmed

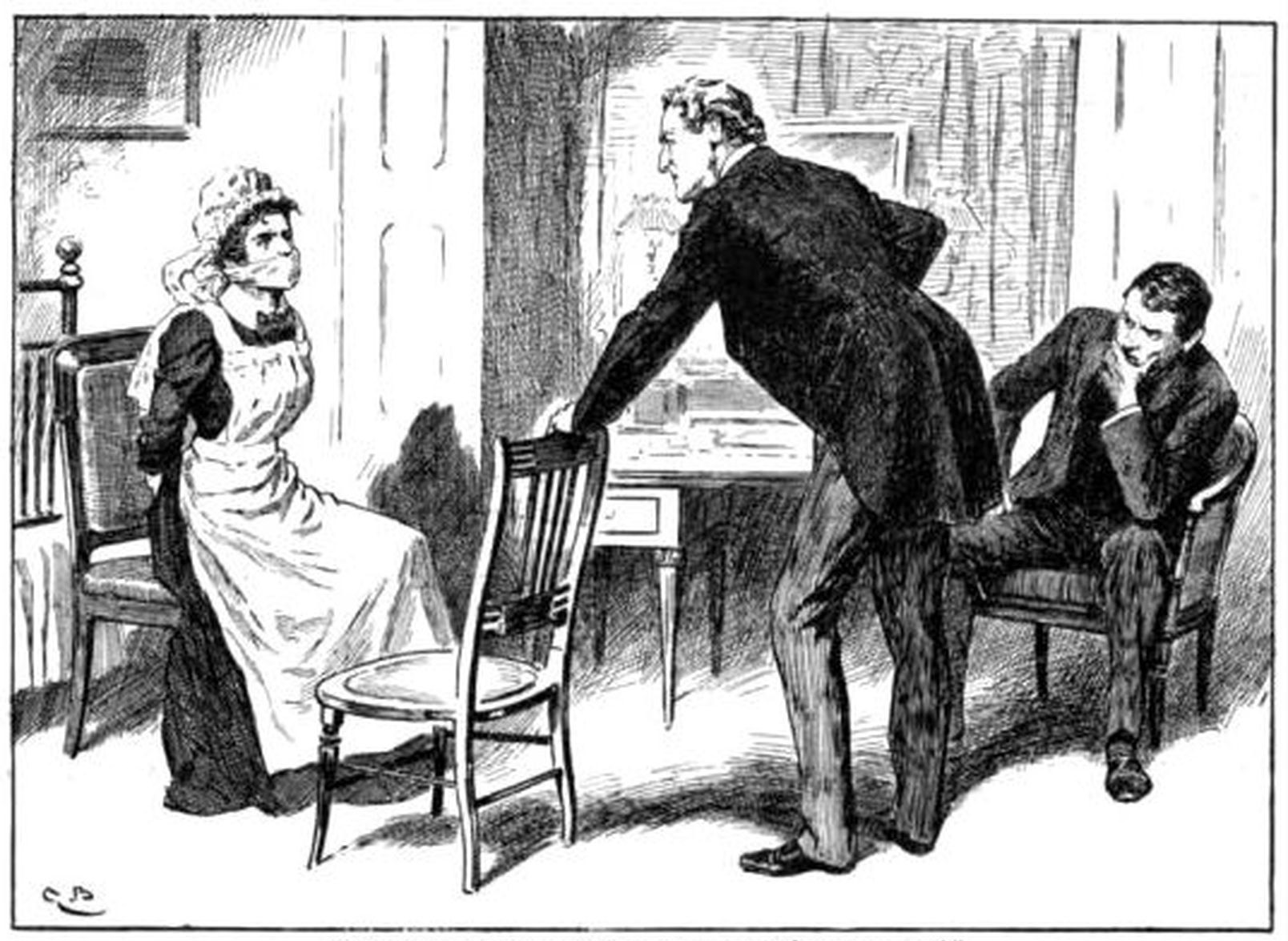
We quite understand each other, don't we, nurse?

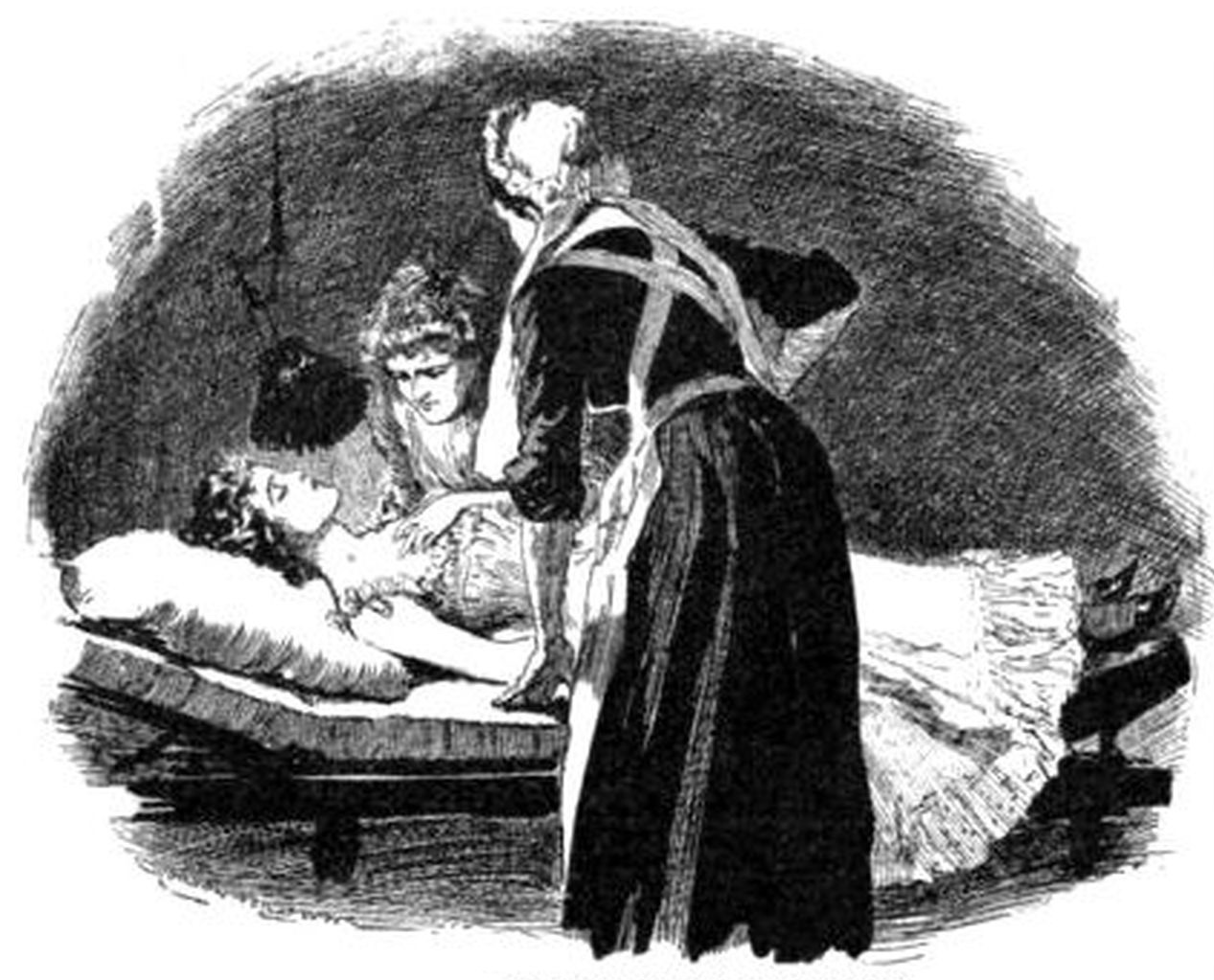
Madame wrote something on her neck

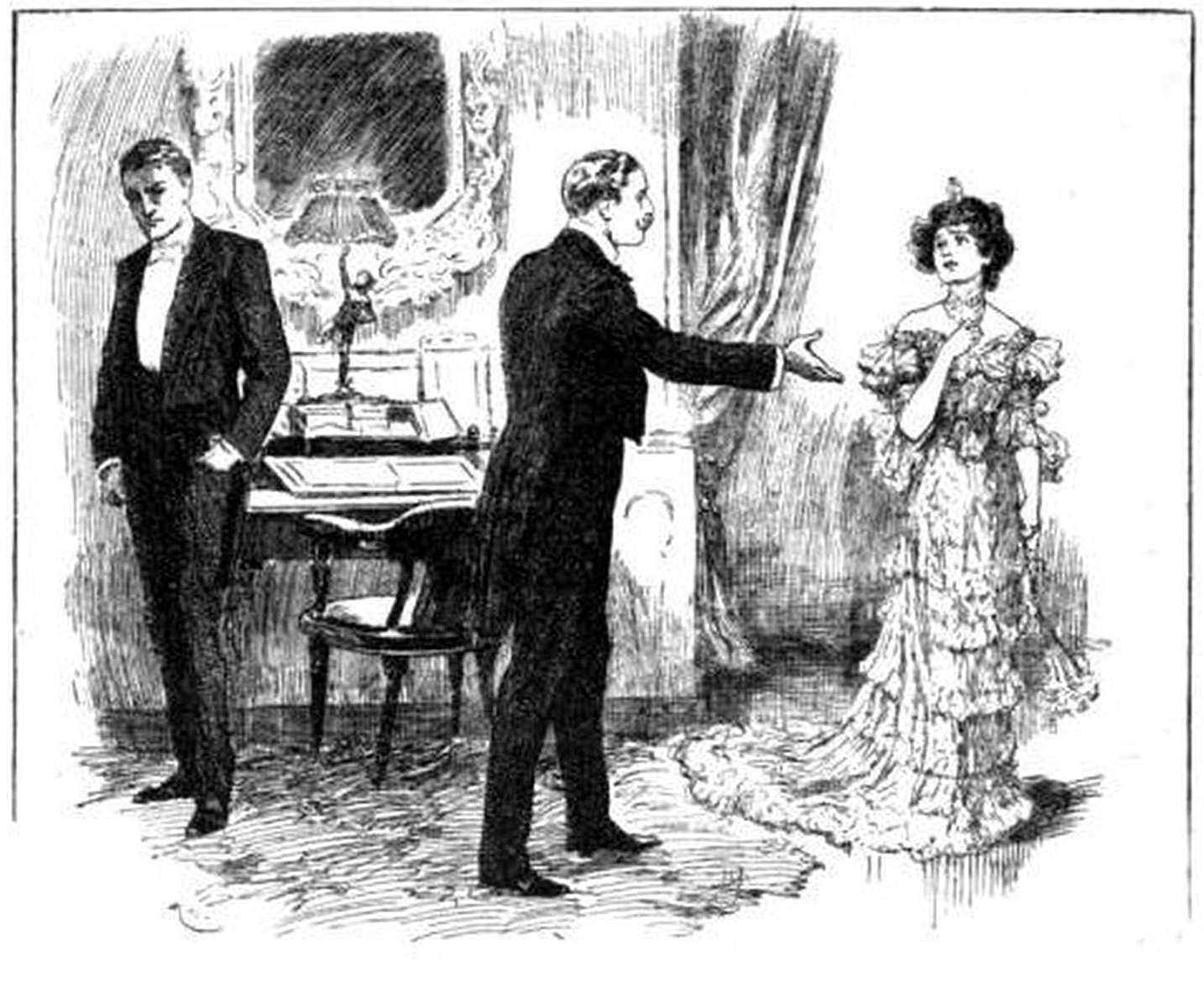
What is it, little one?

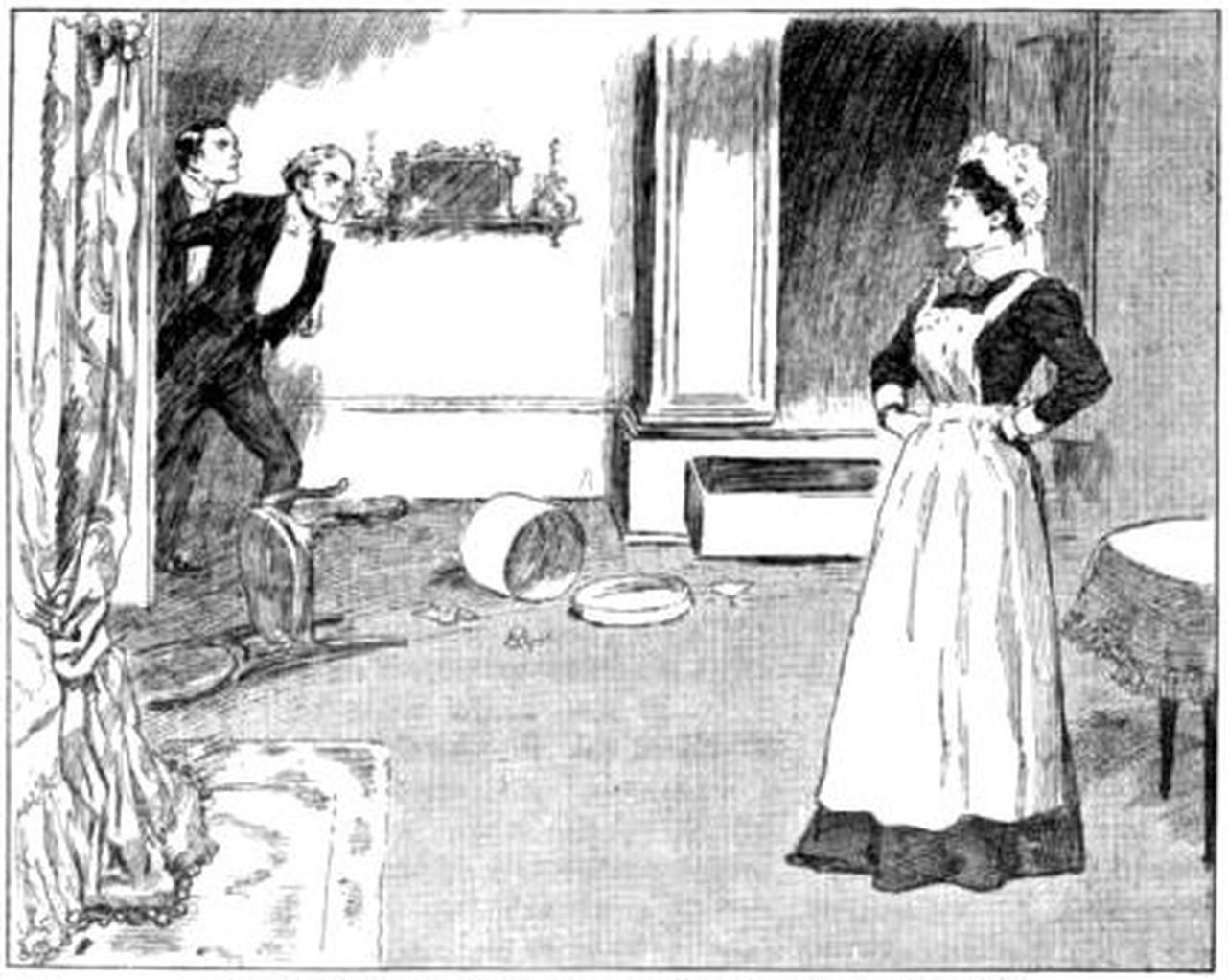
Rebecca Curt was standing in the middle of the room

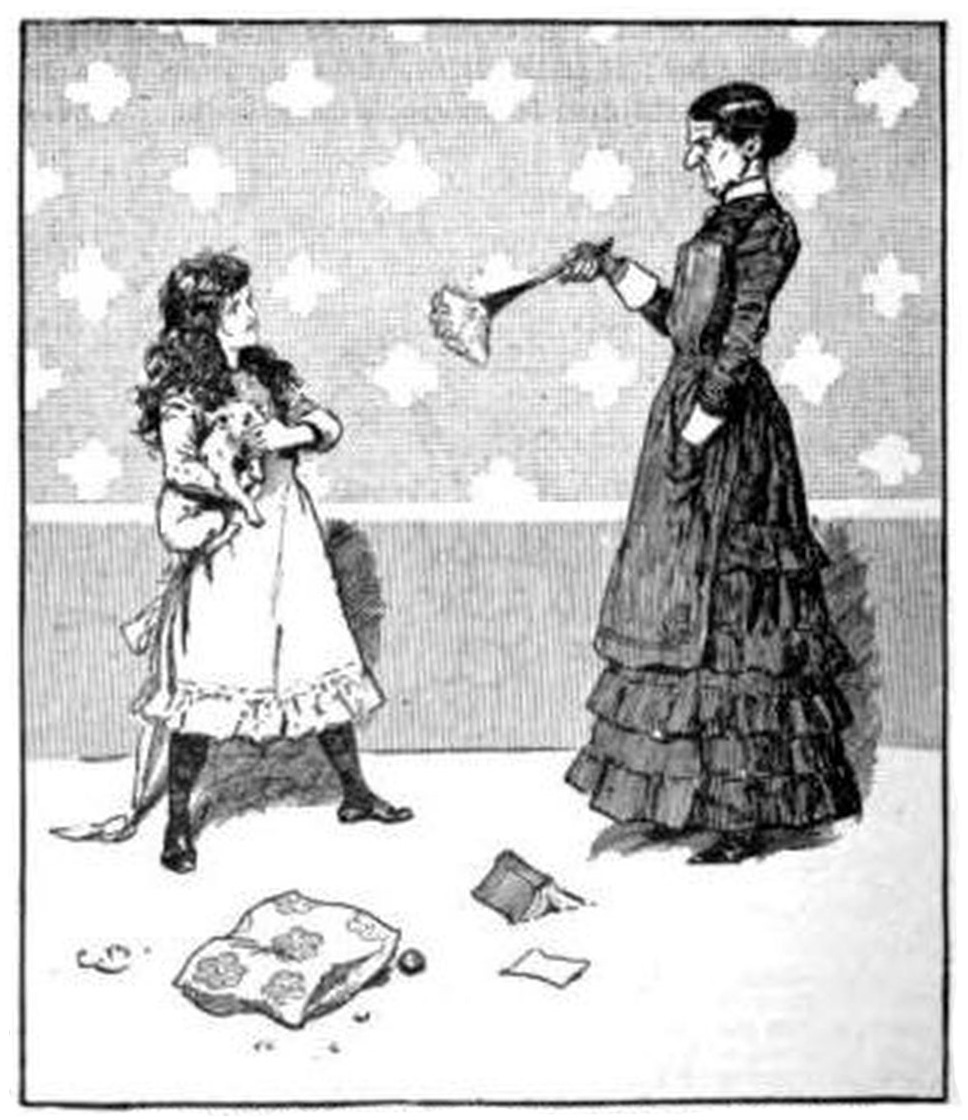
She treated her with a rare want of sympathy

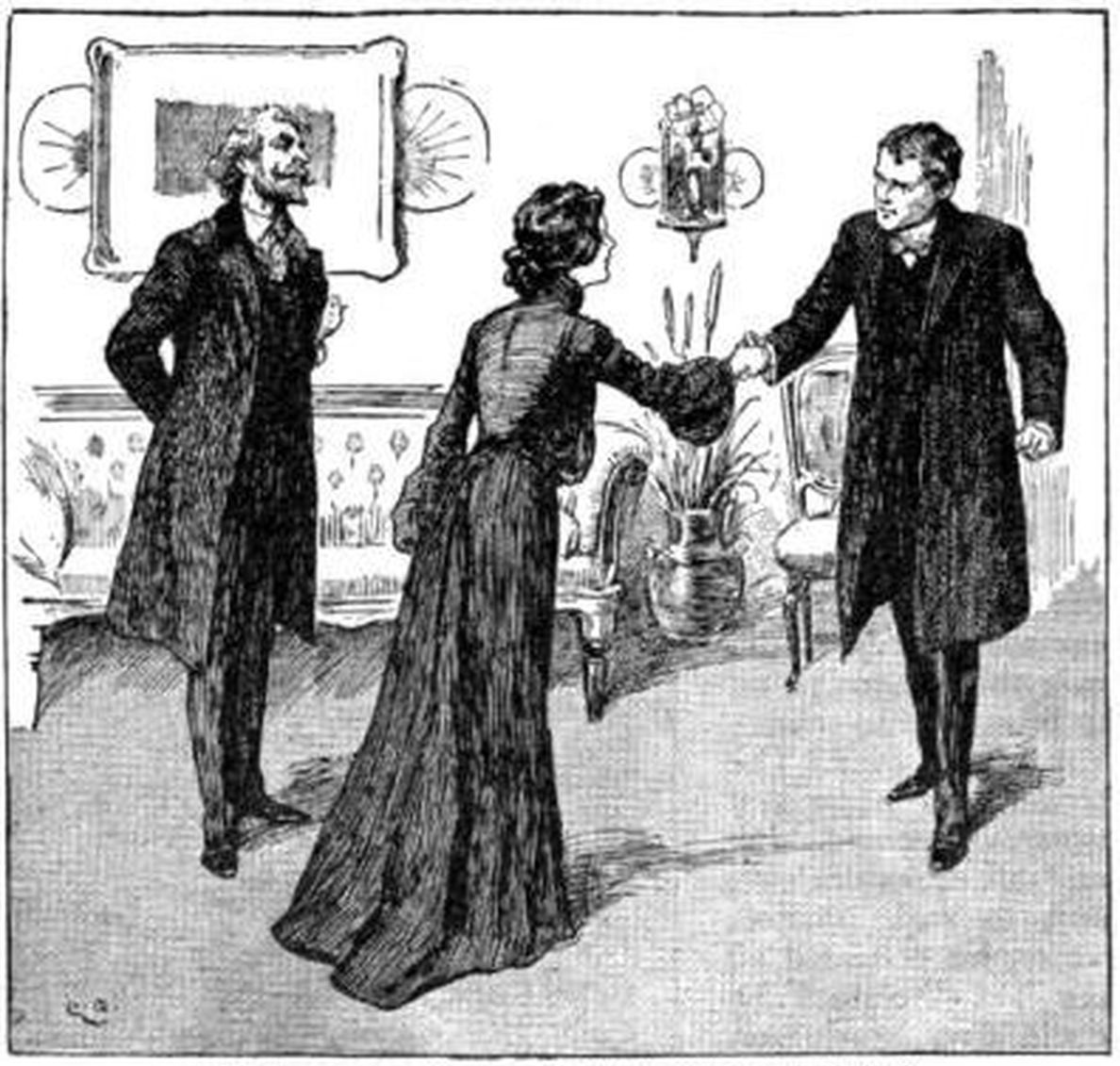
How kind of you to come

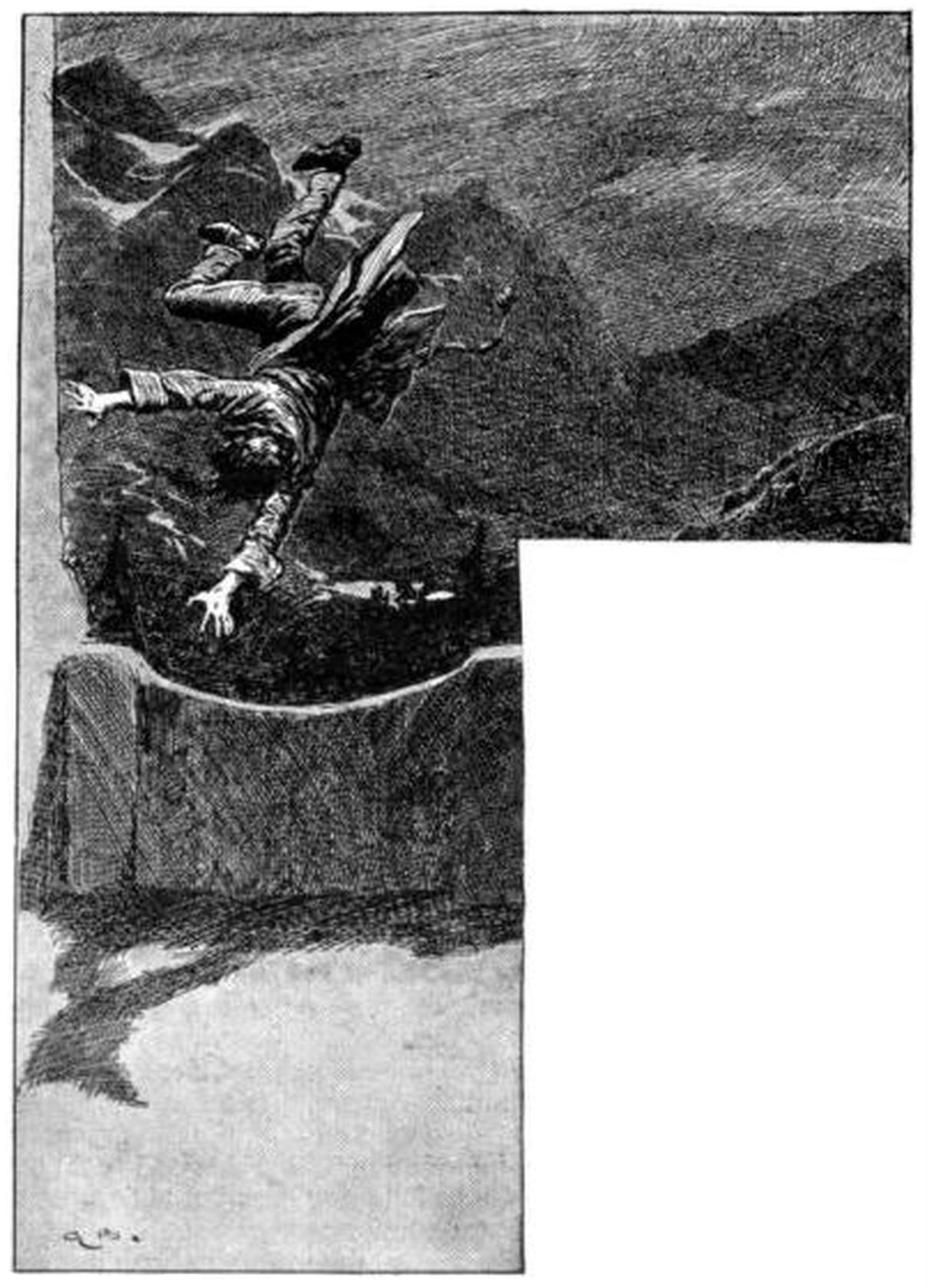
He dashed headlong down

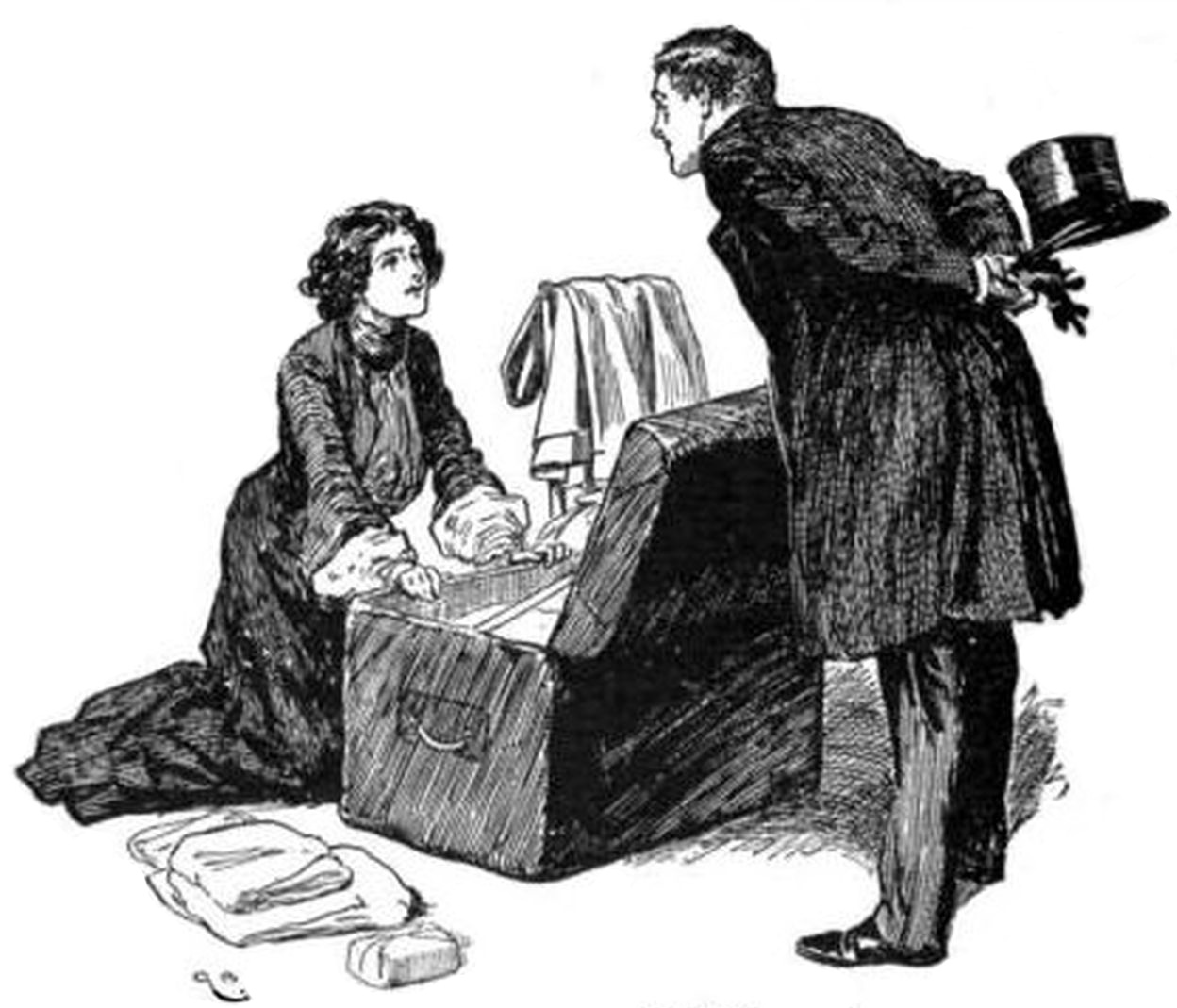
You must not scold me

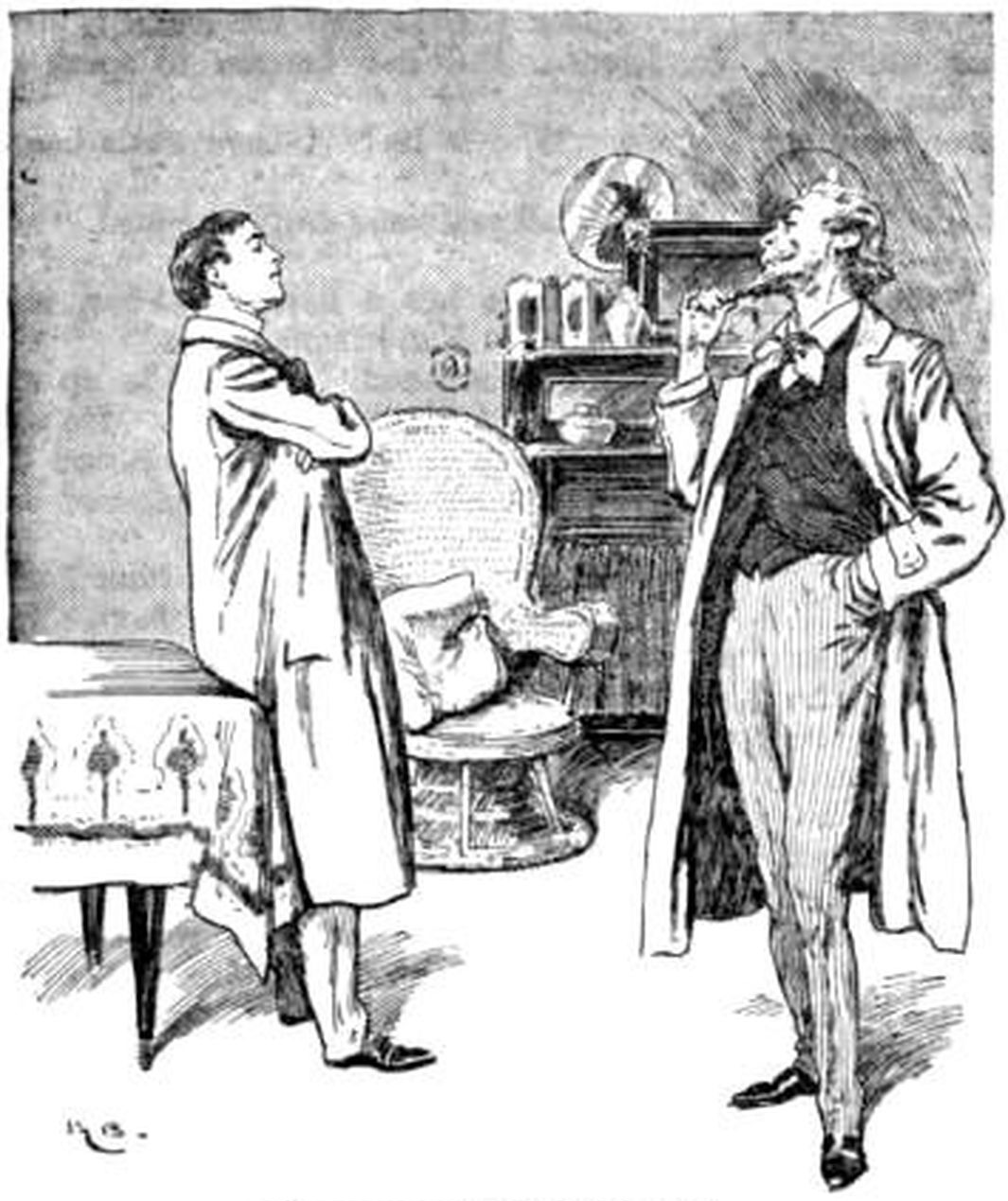
You mean Madame Sara?

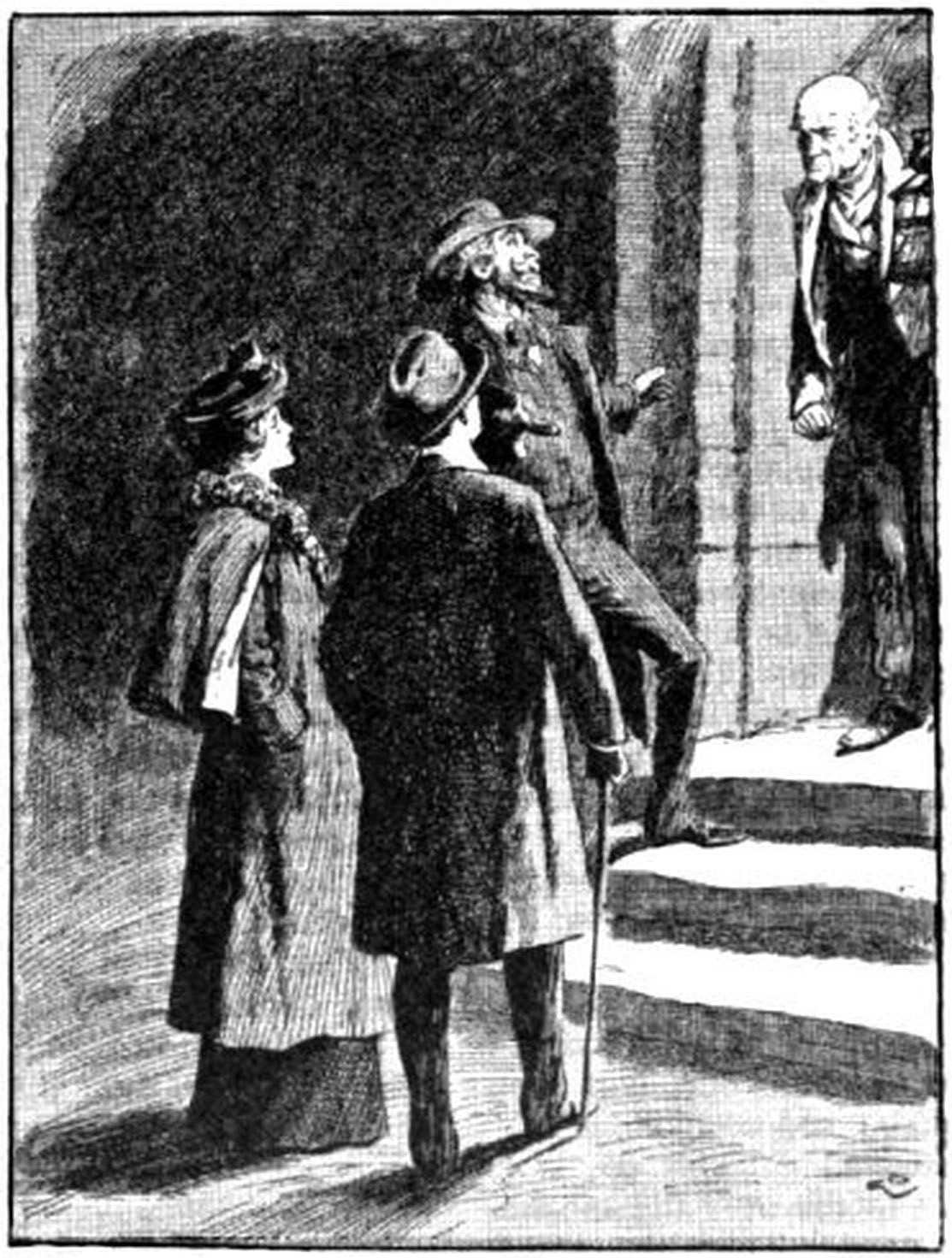
A phlegmatic-looking man opened the door for us

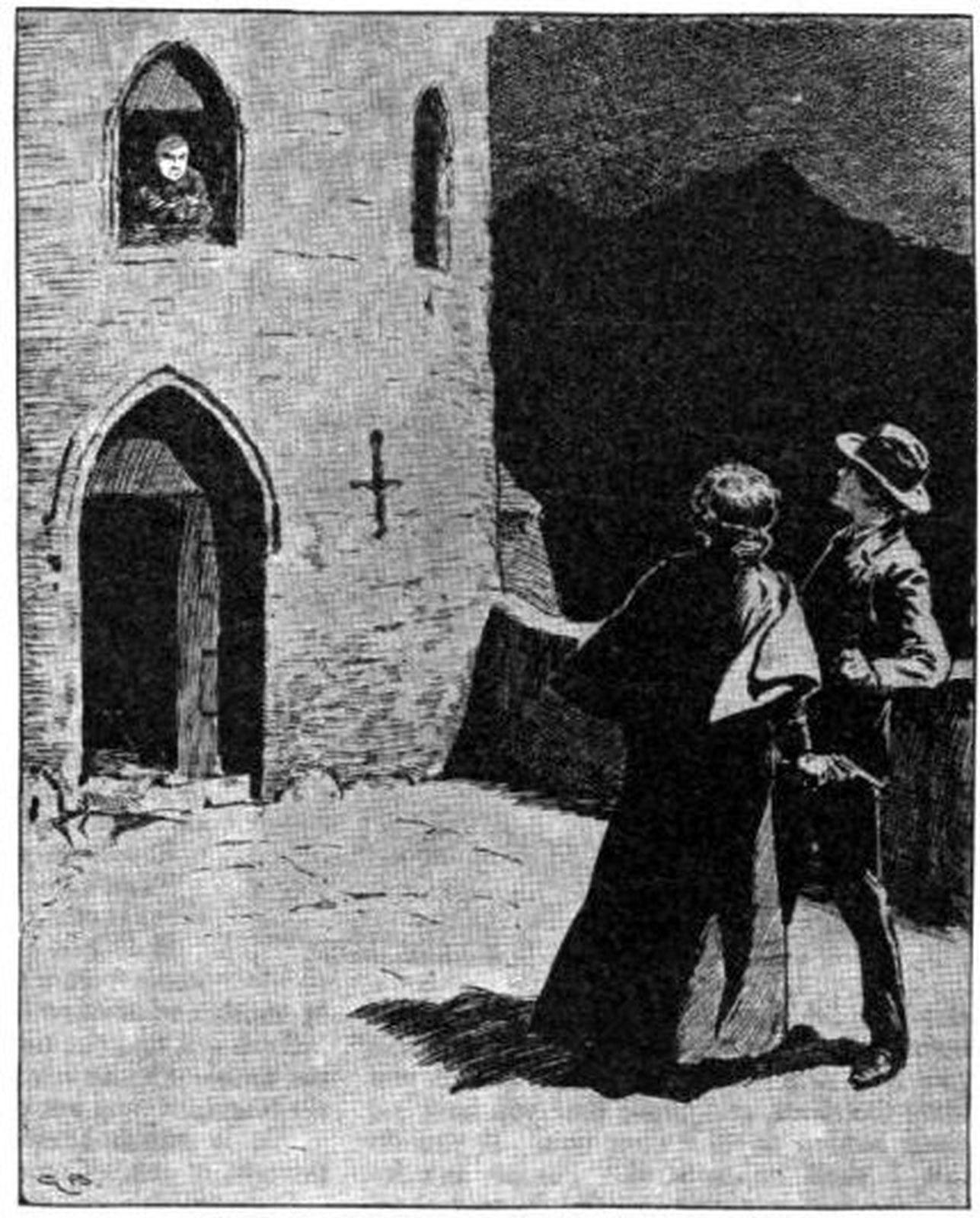
There in the moonlight...

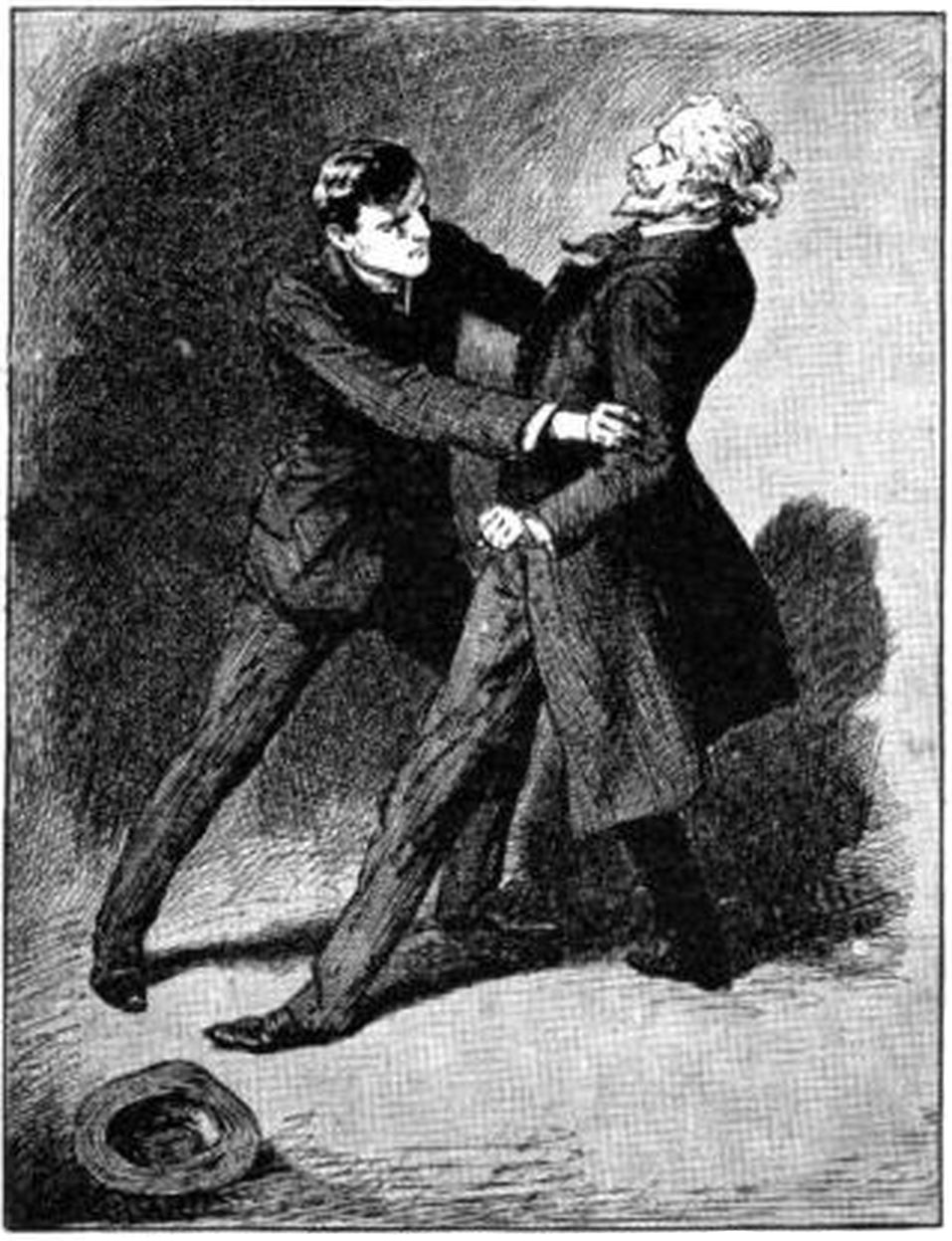
Either you are the spectre, or it is supernatural

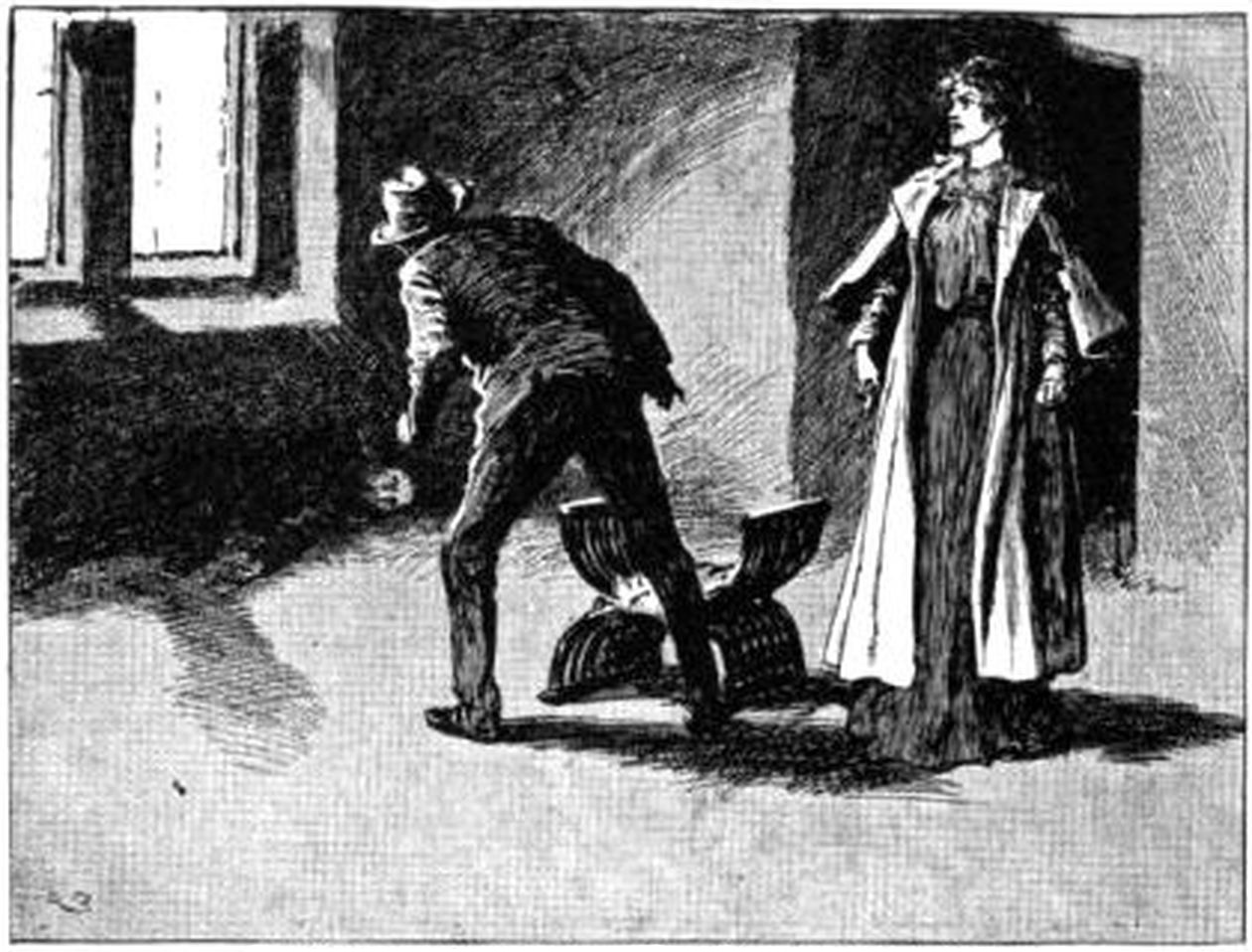
Beneath the window lay a dark, huddled heap

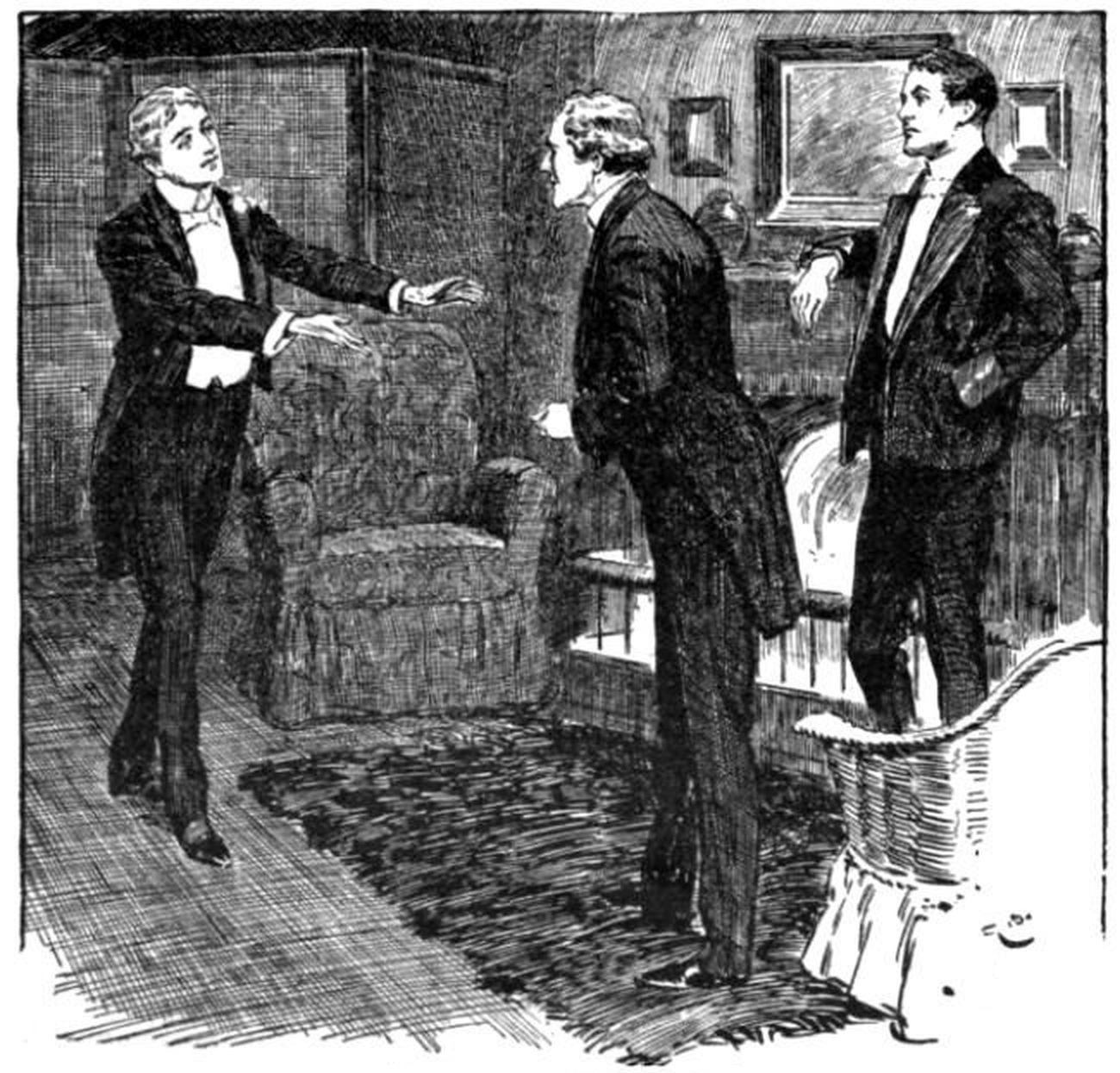
Professor Pozzi entered

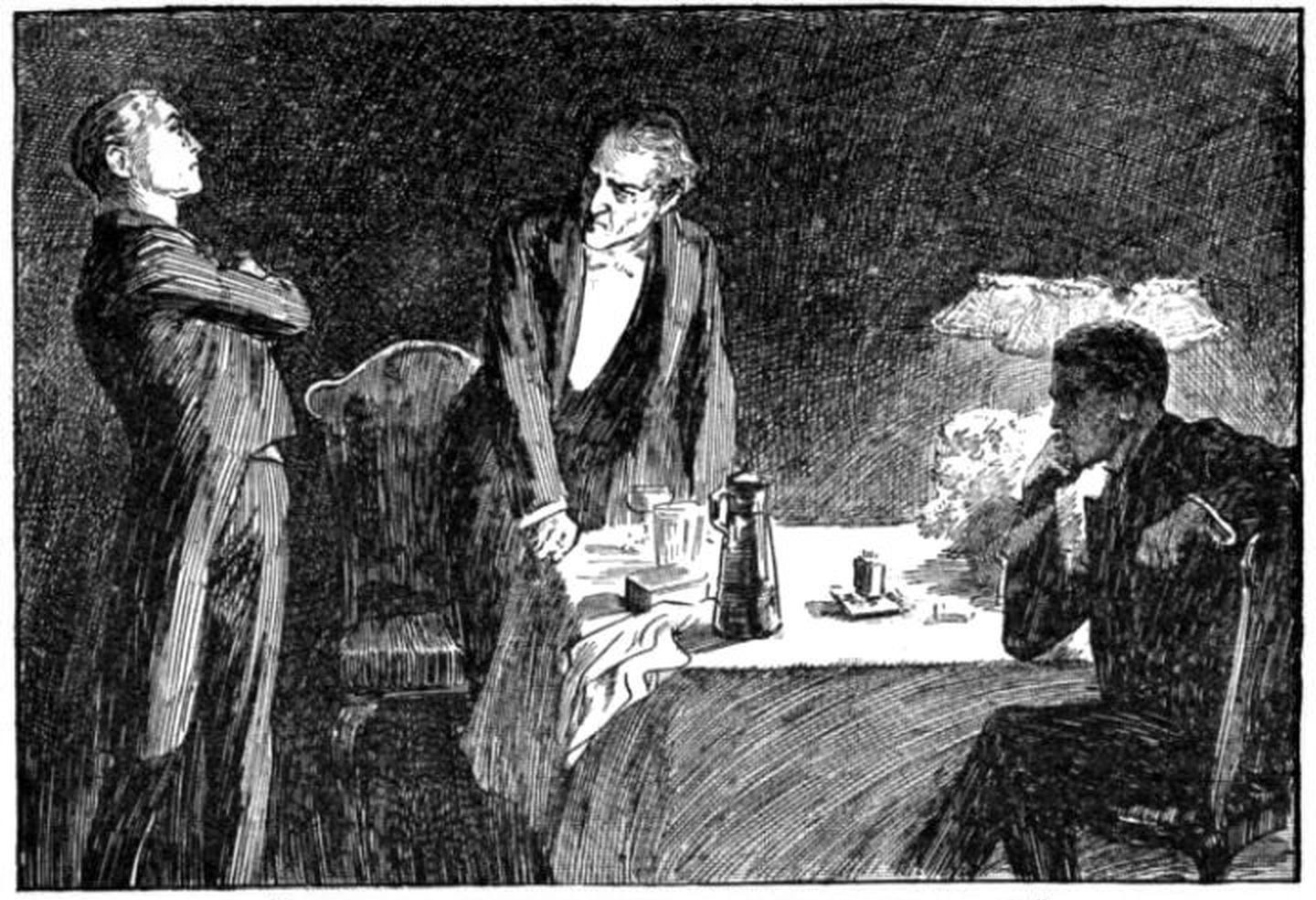
You exceed the limits of propriety

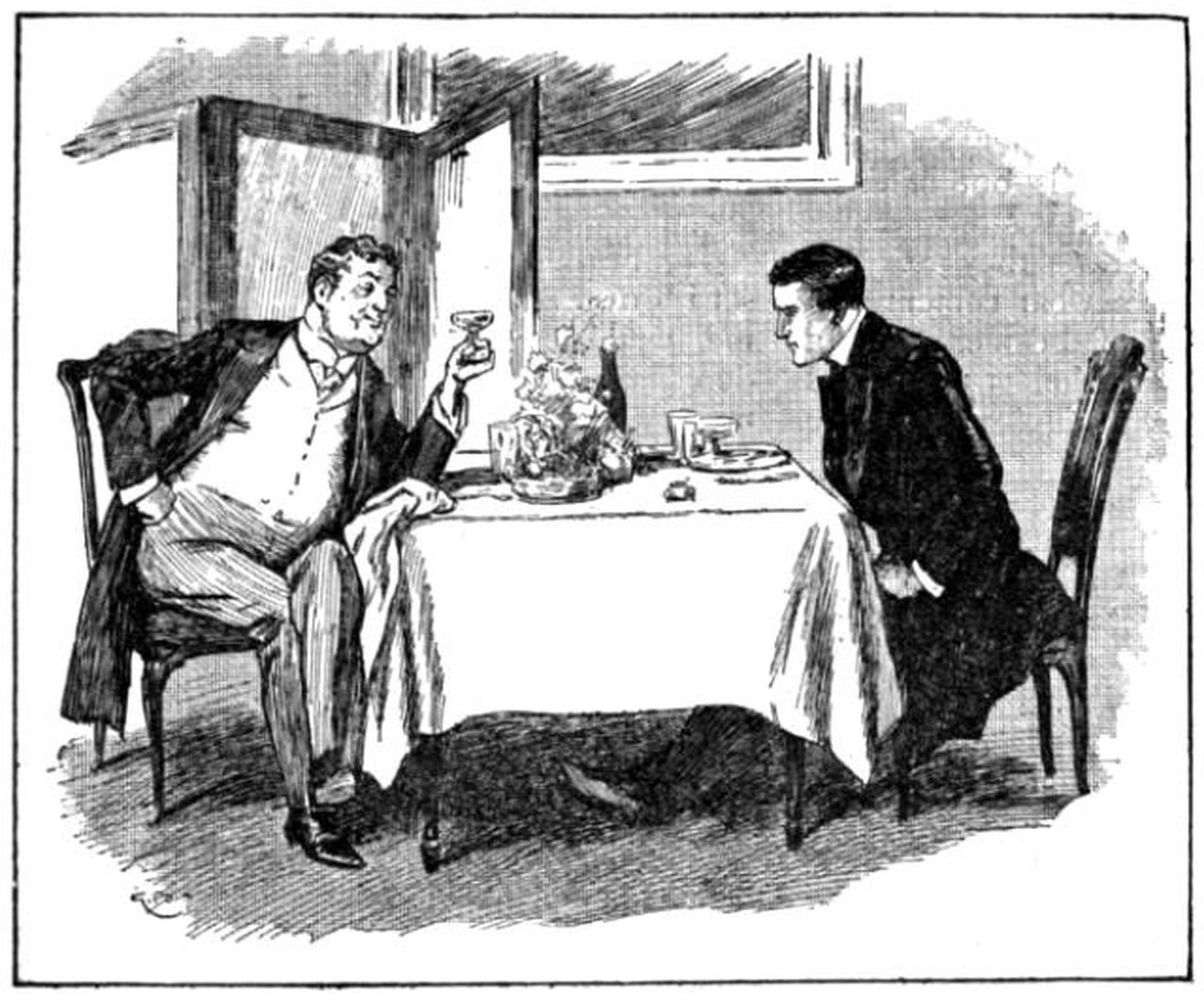
Ah! There are few women so kind

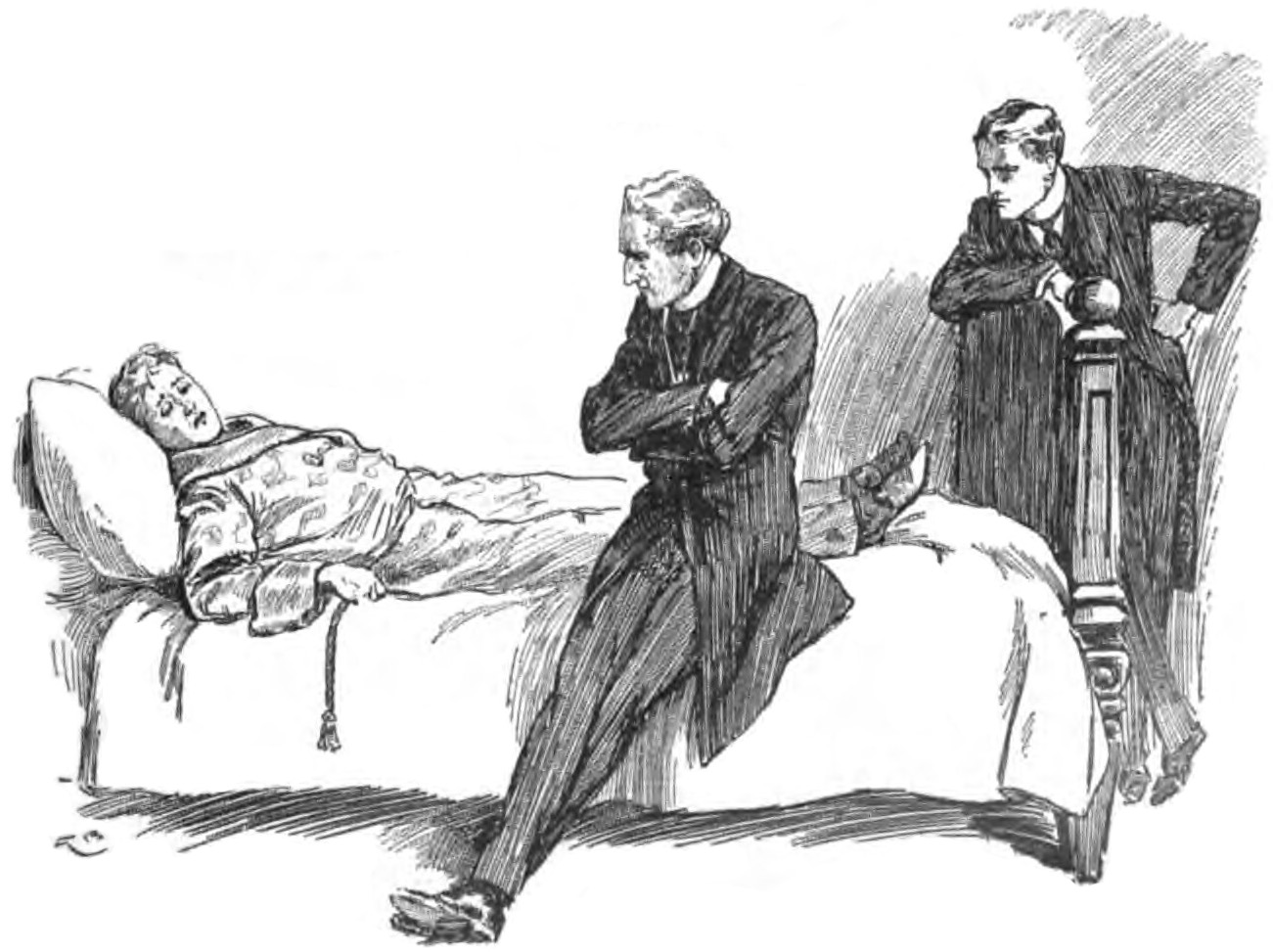
Who would want to take my life?

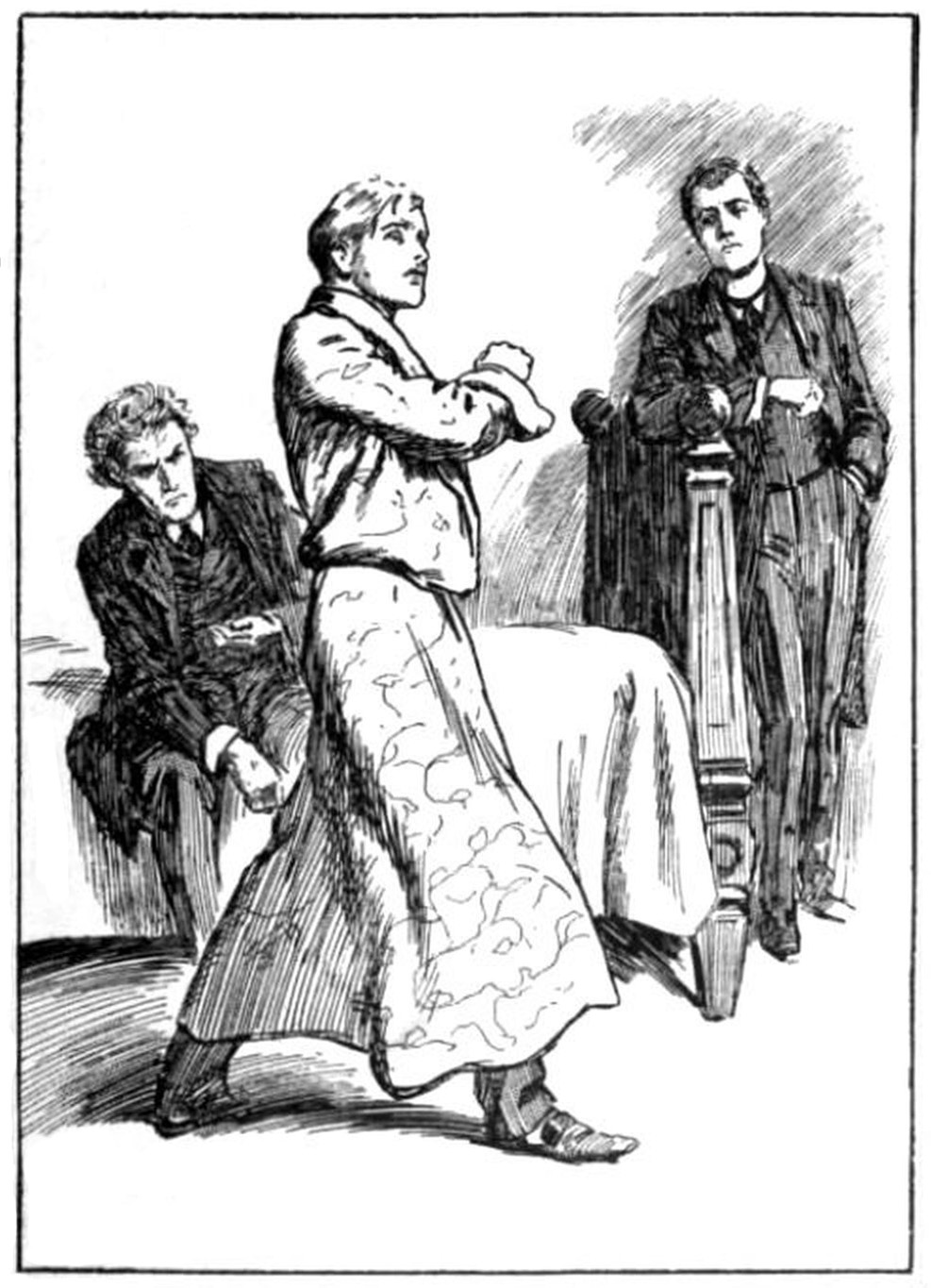
I will revenge myself on Madame to the last drop of my blood

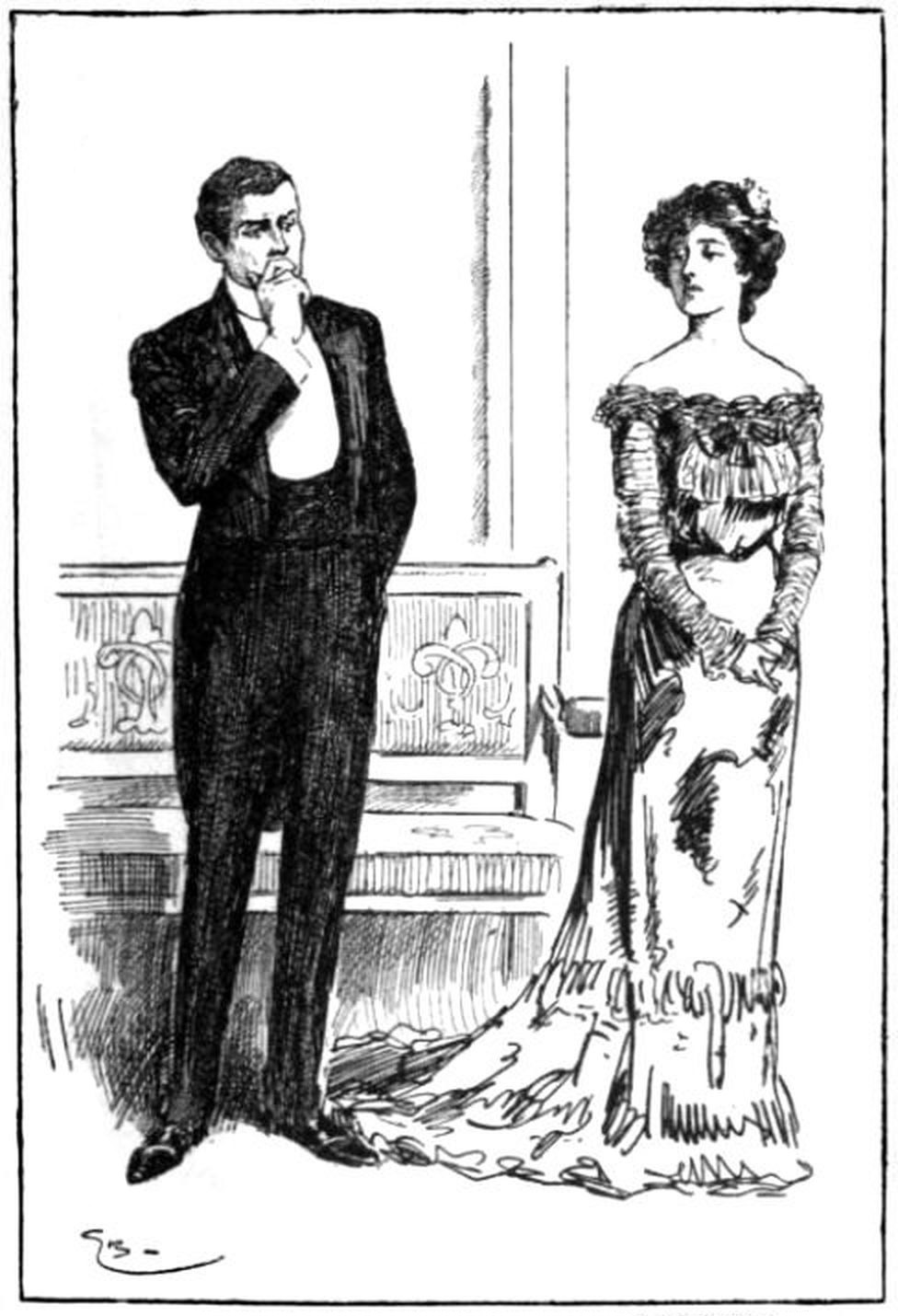
I am sorry to hear of his illness

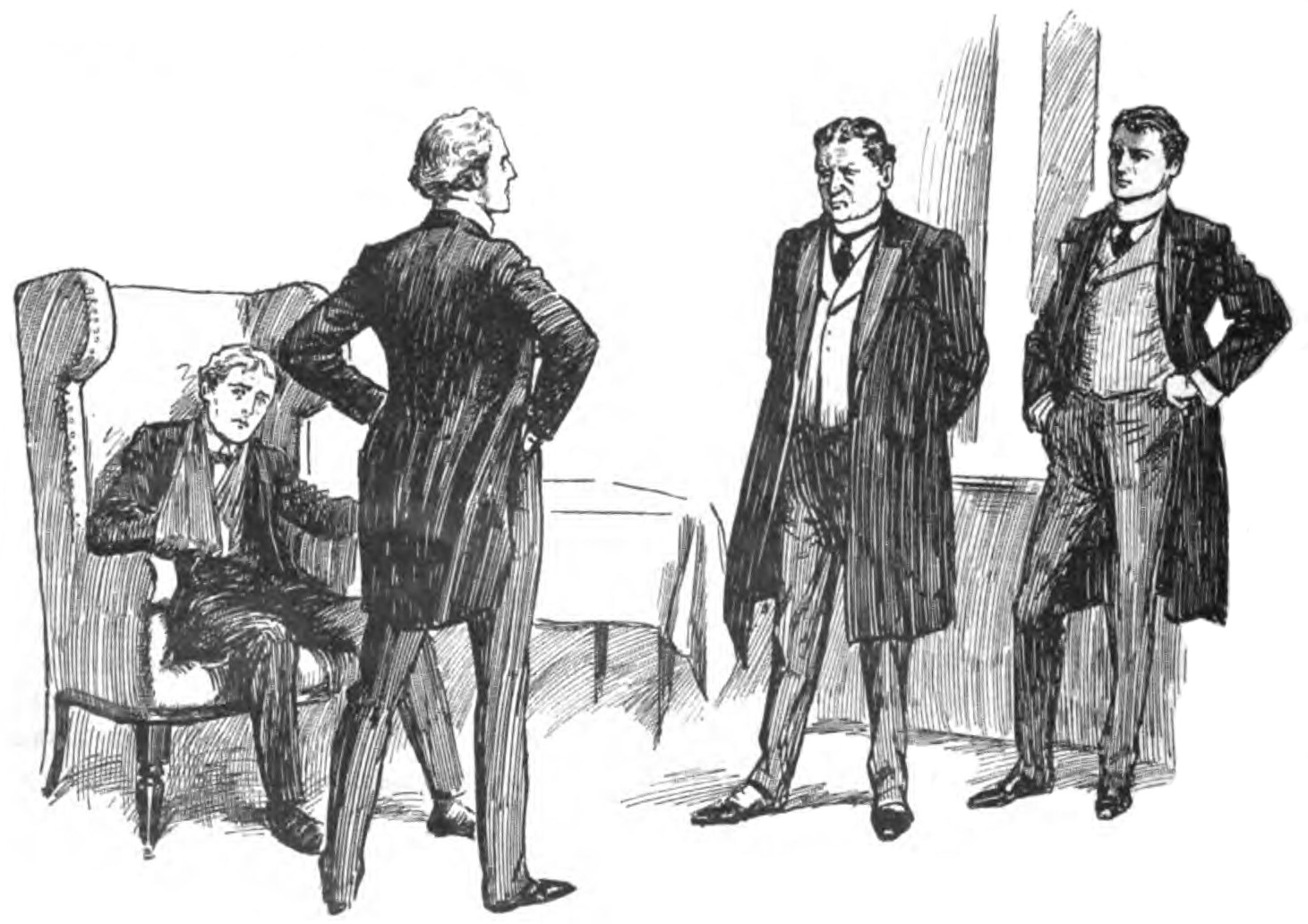
Are your operations for securing patent rights complete?

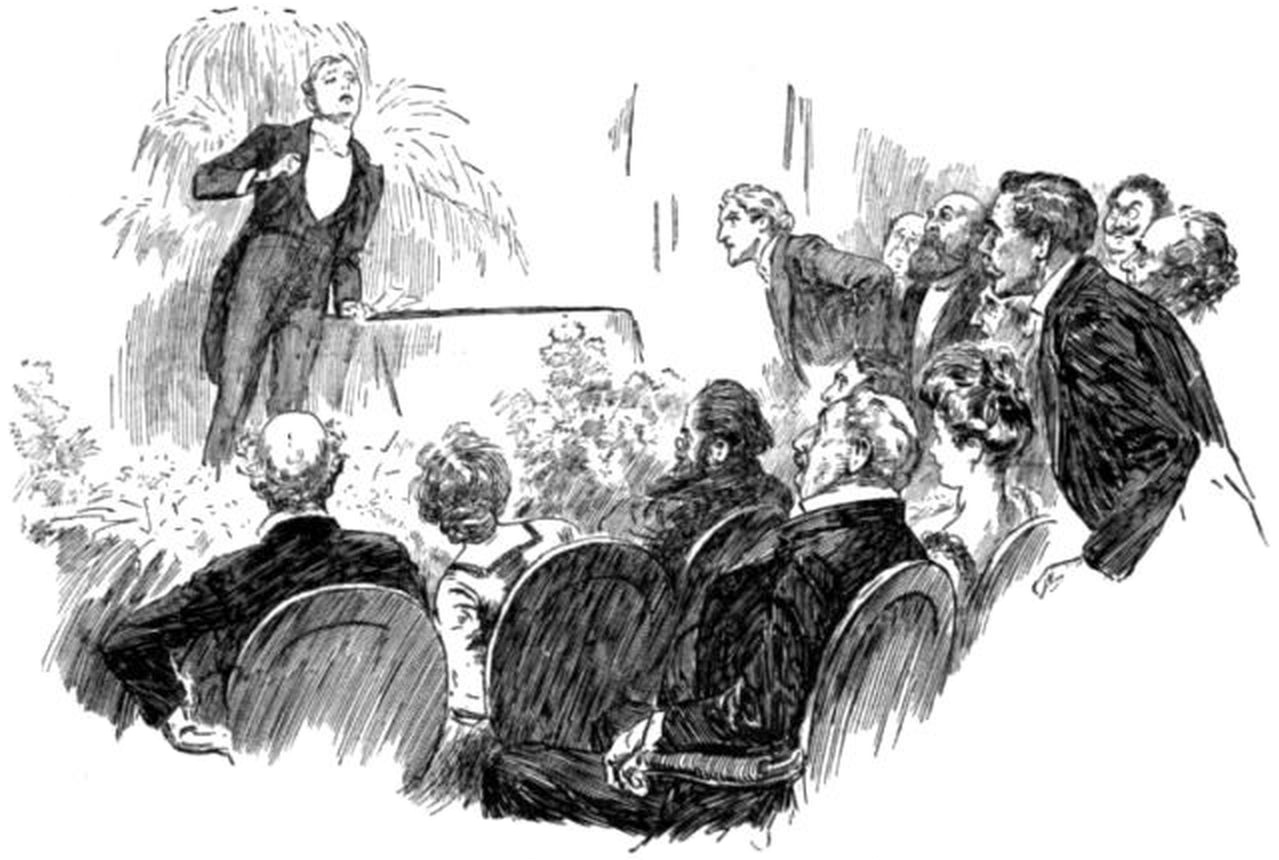
He reeled and made a lunge forward

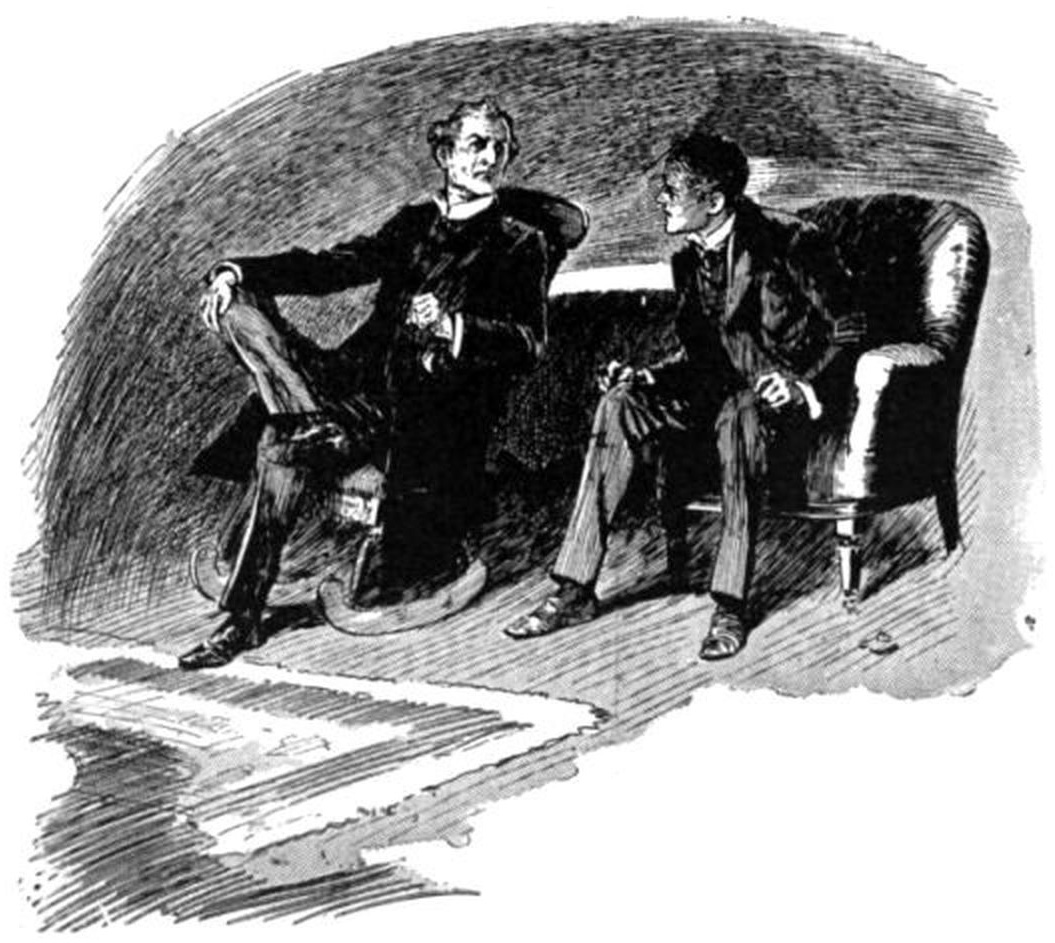
It is a curious fact

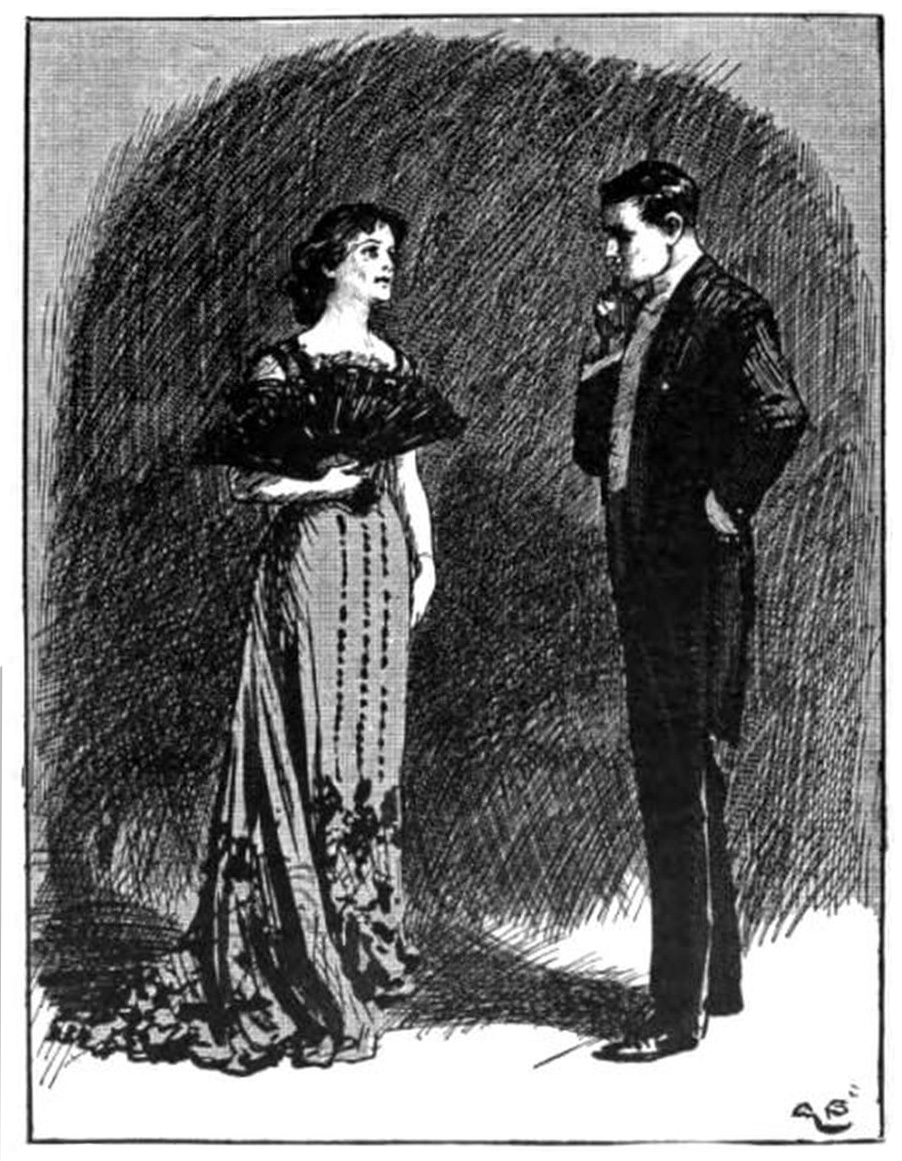
Don't look at me

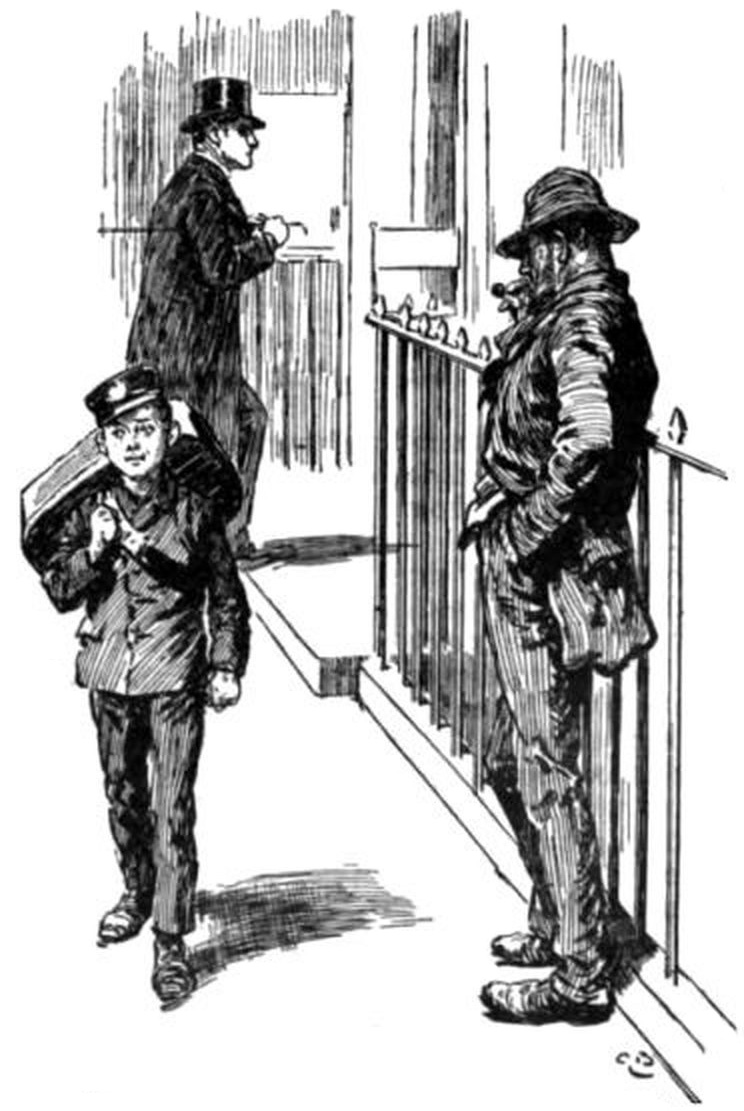
I observed a man

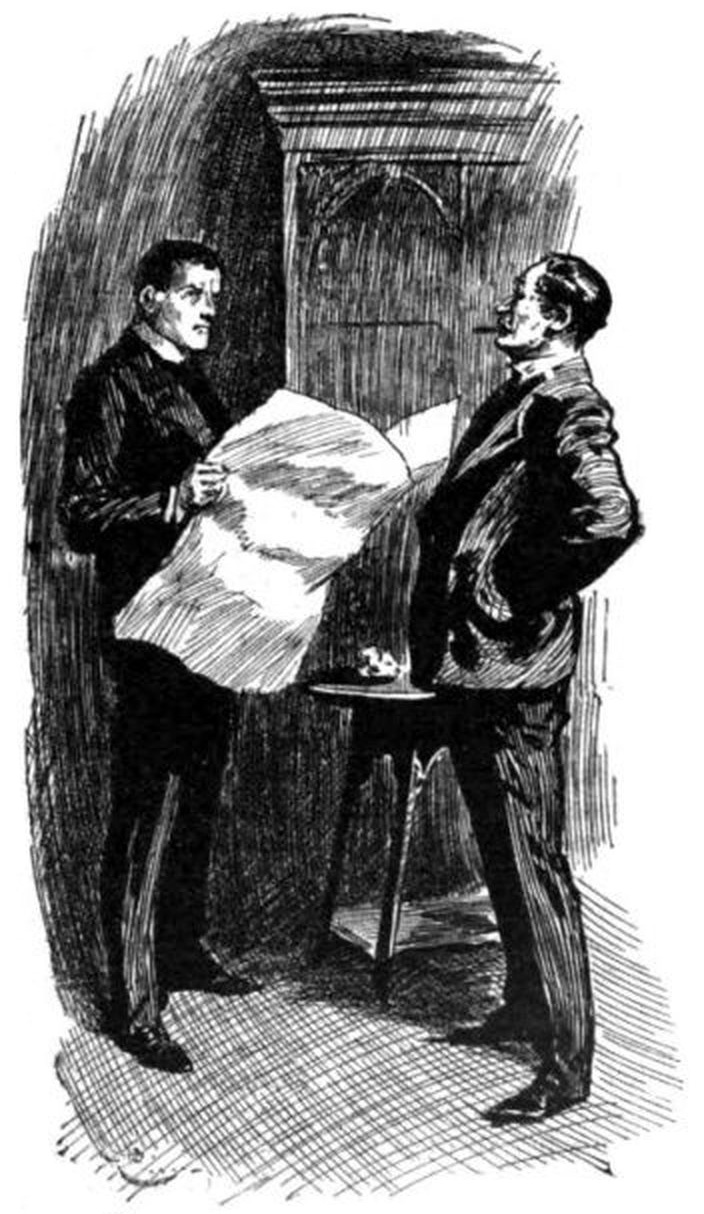
I do not know envy Ali Khan his billet

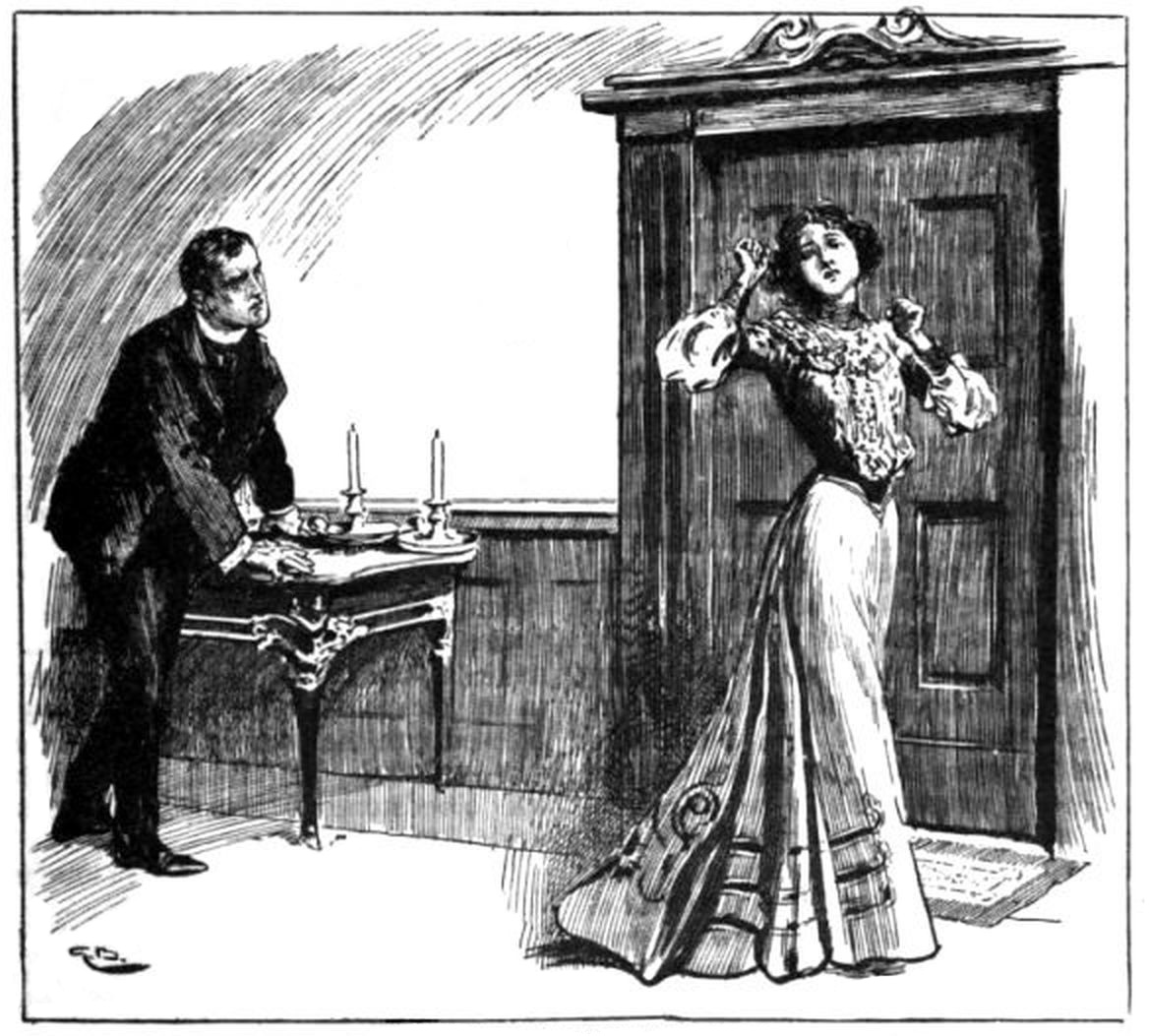
Heaven help me!

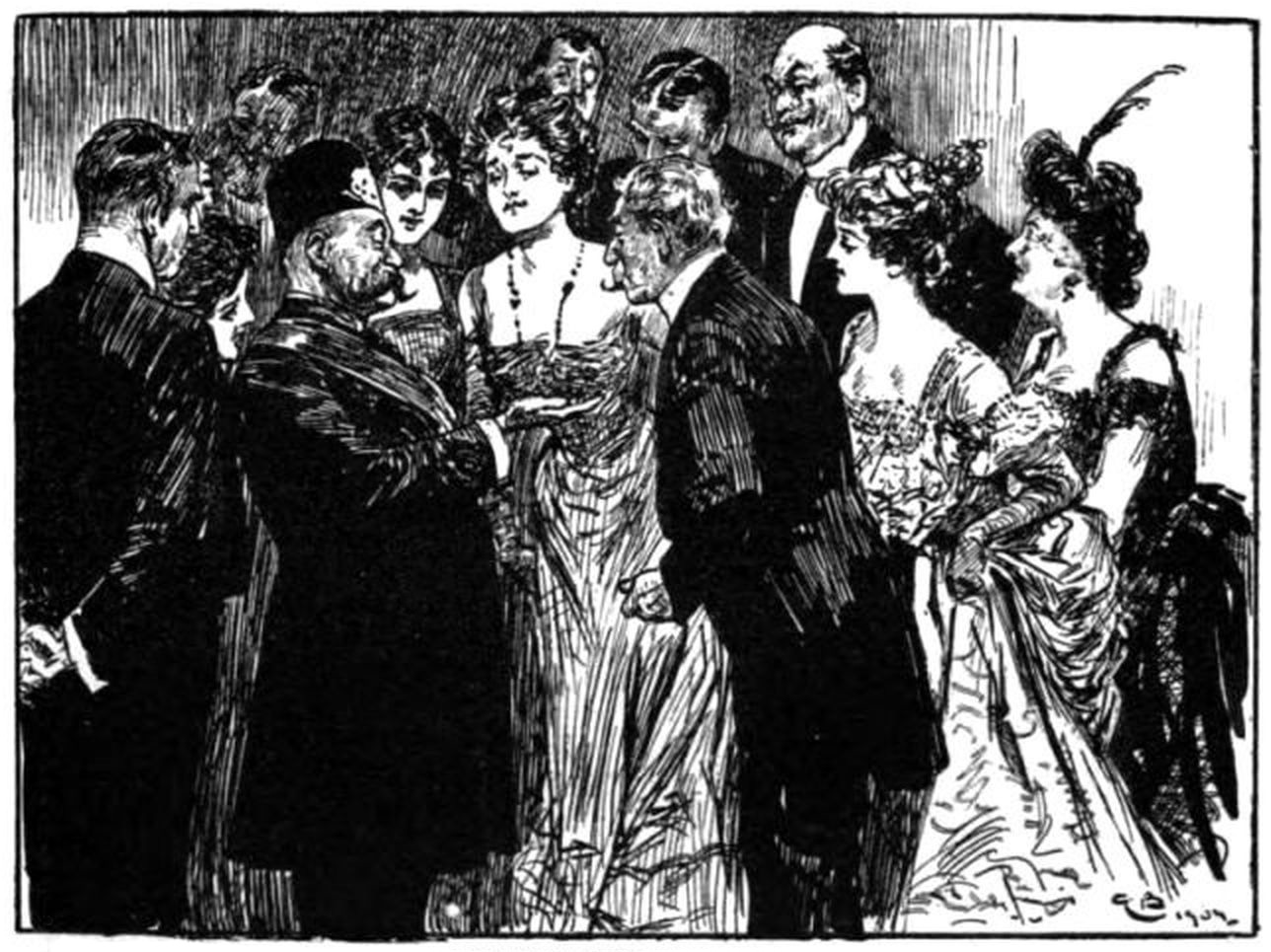
Look closely at it if you will

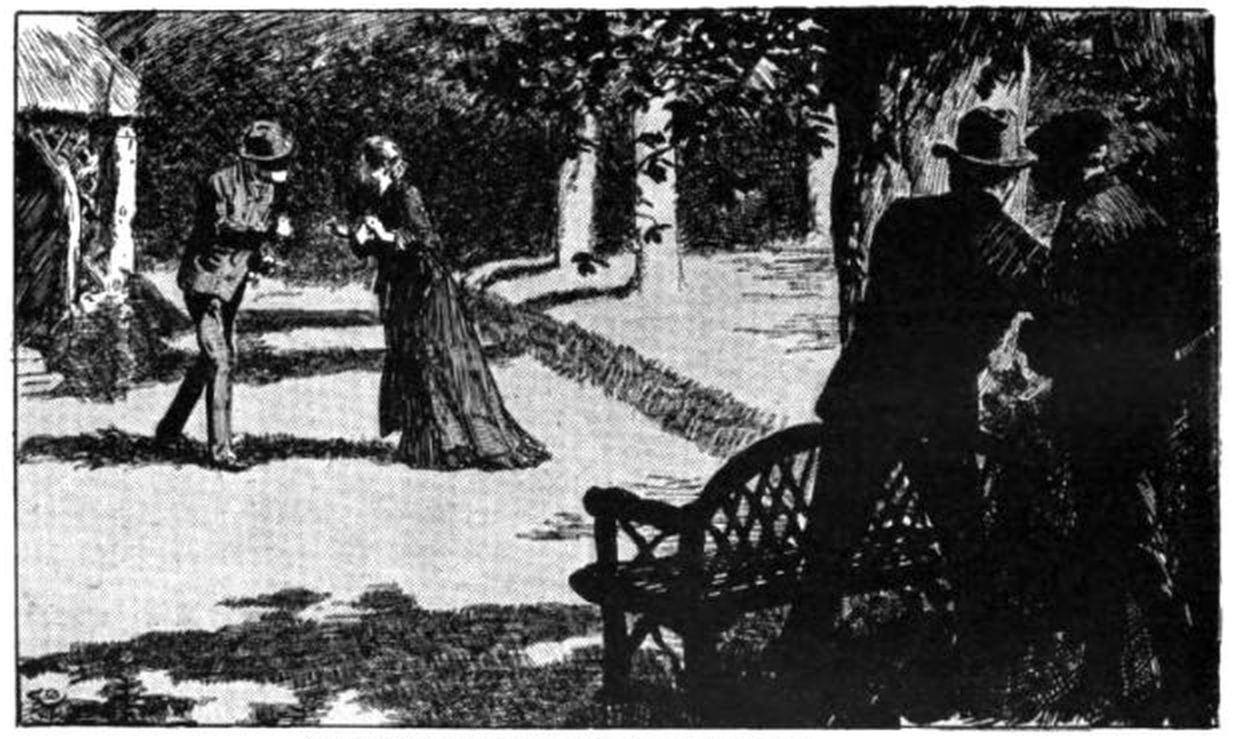
A man with a mask over his face approached her

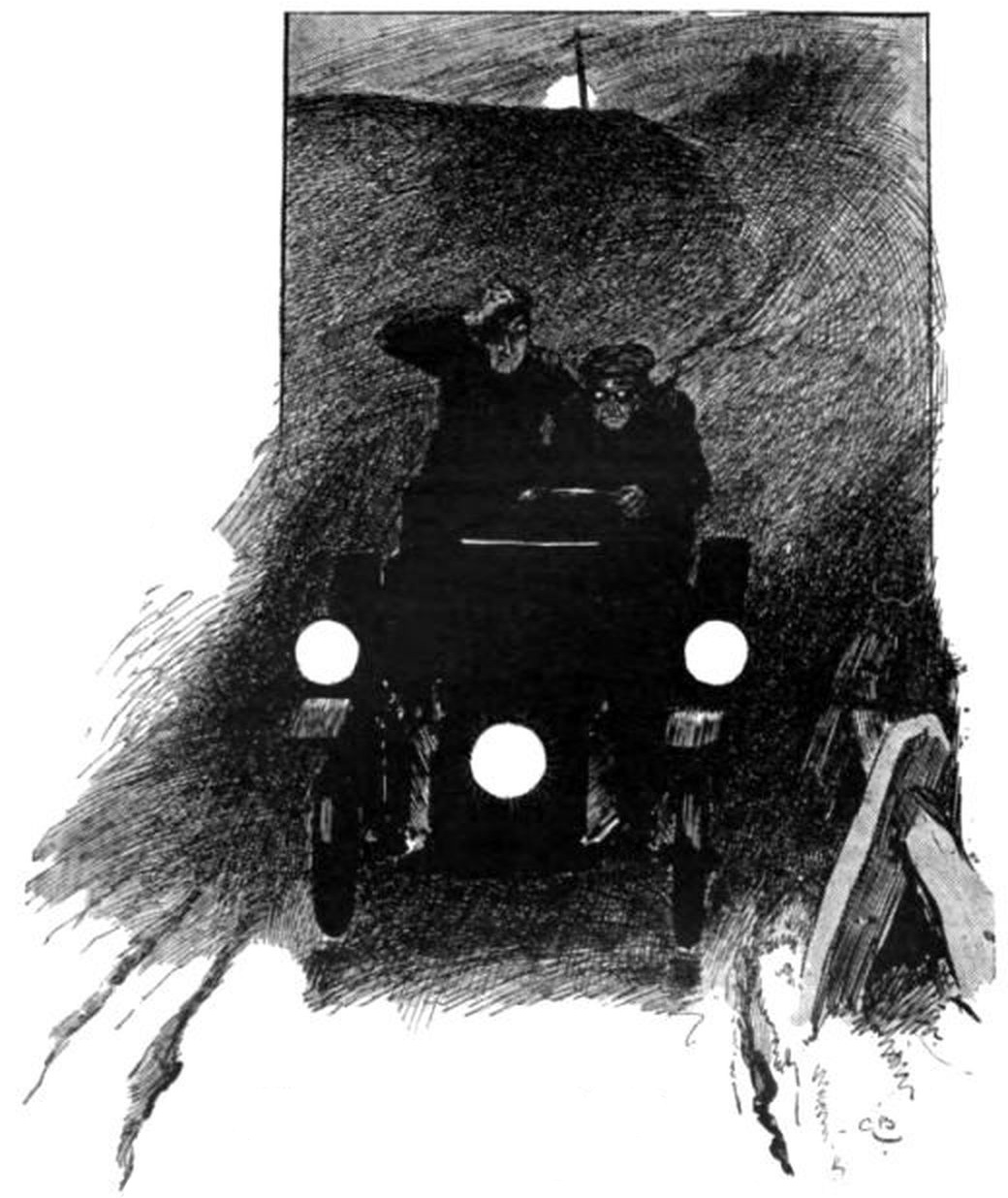
Two minutes later we were rushing through the night towards London

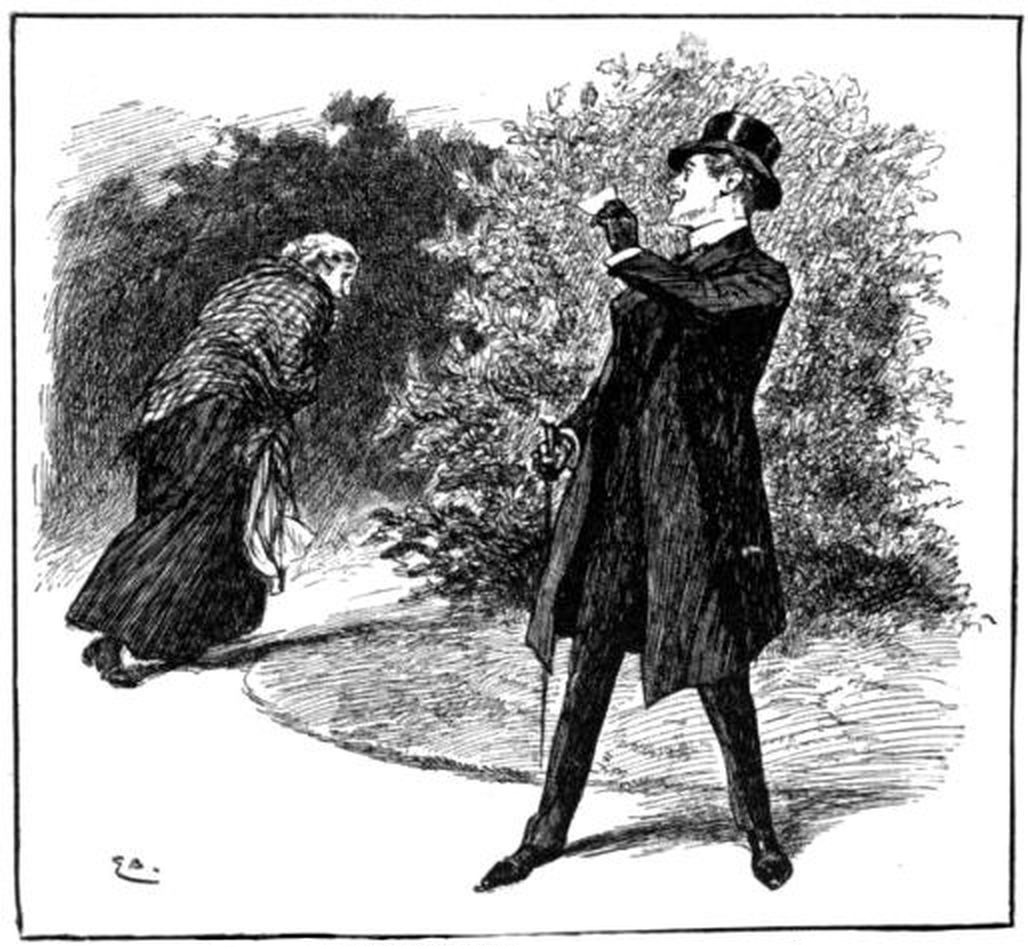
Laura's old nurse thrust a note into his hand

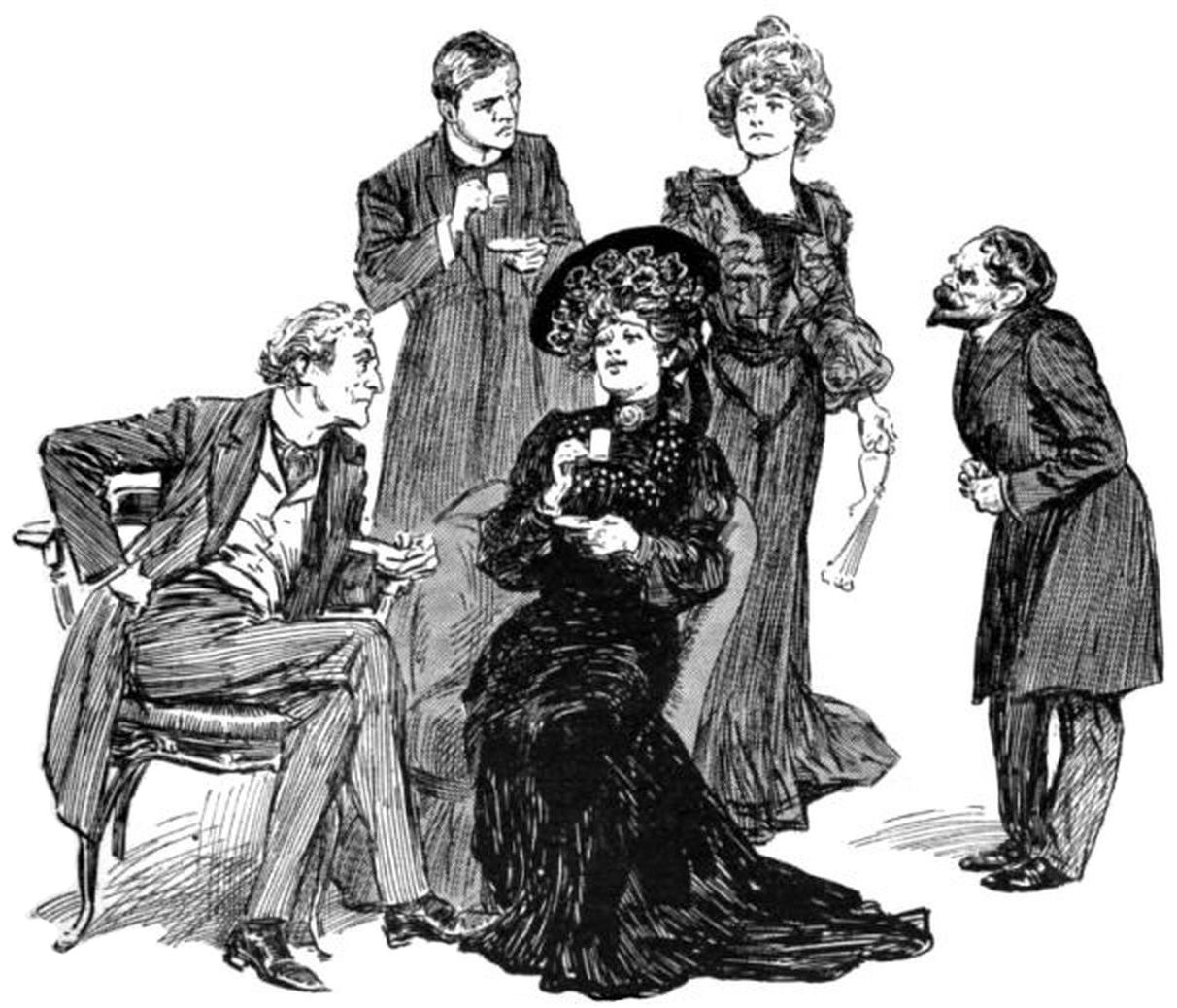
My friend, Sir Joseph Dixby

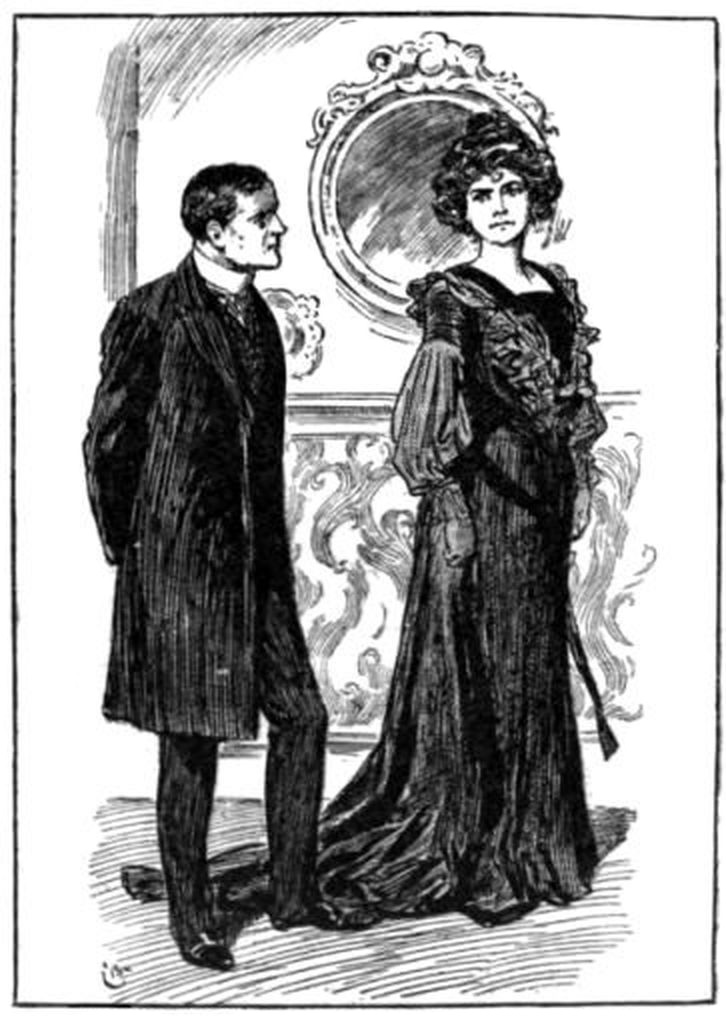
You are certain you will not turn coward?

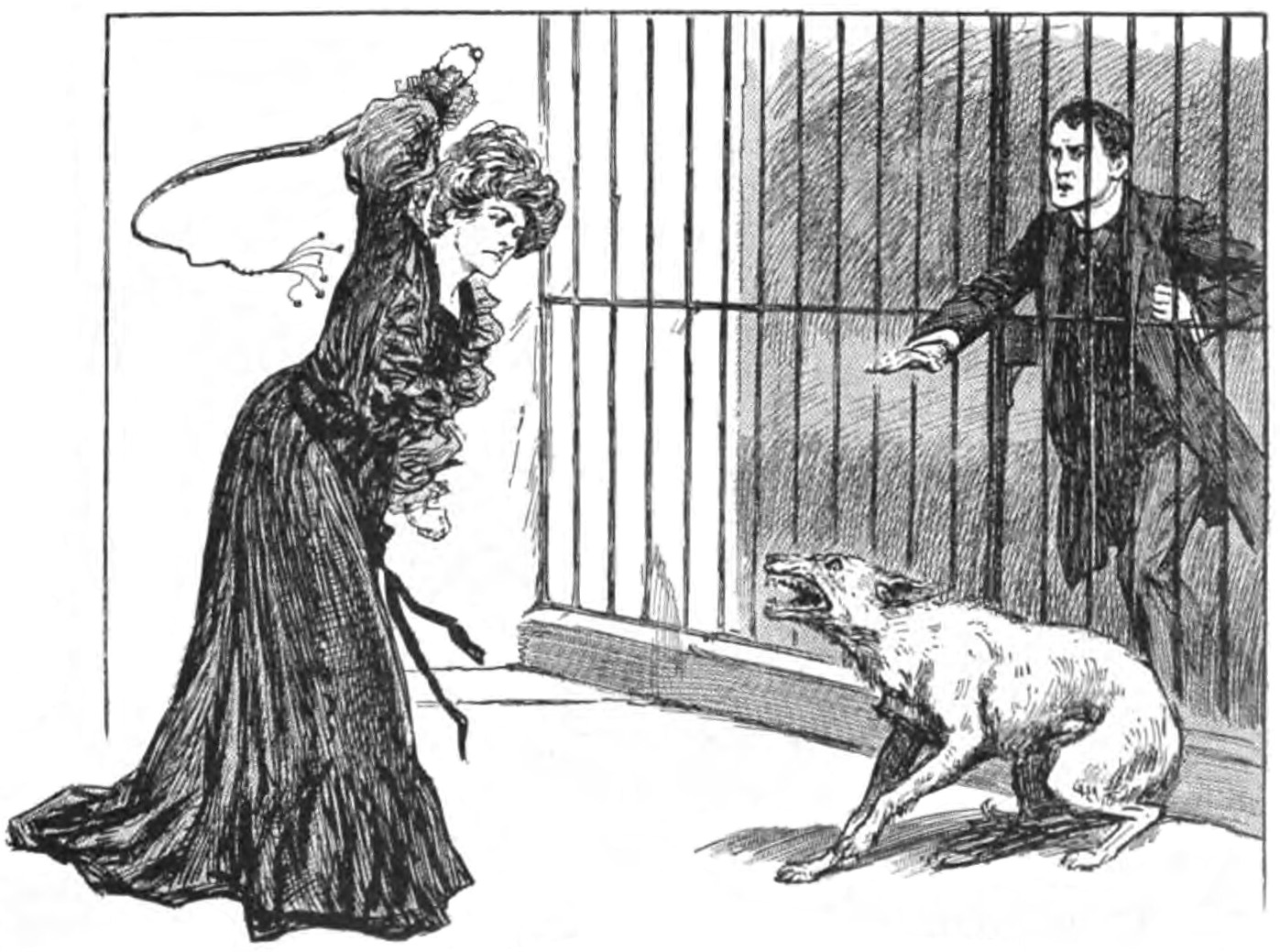
She lashed the animal

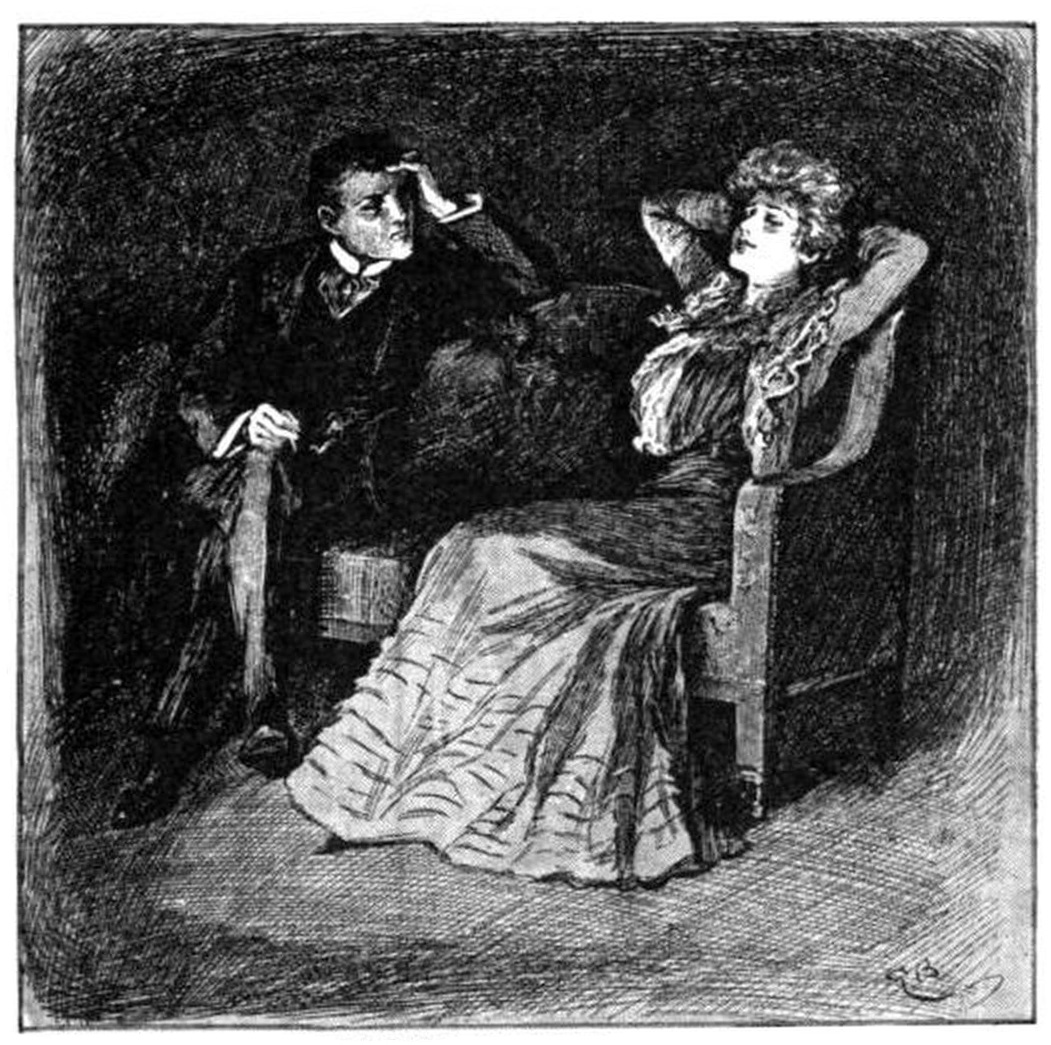
She sat still

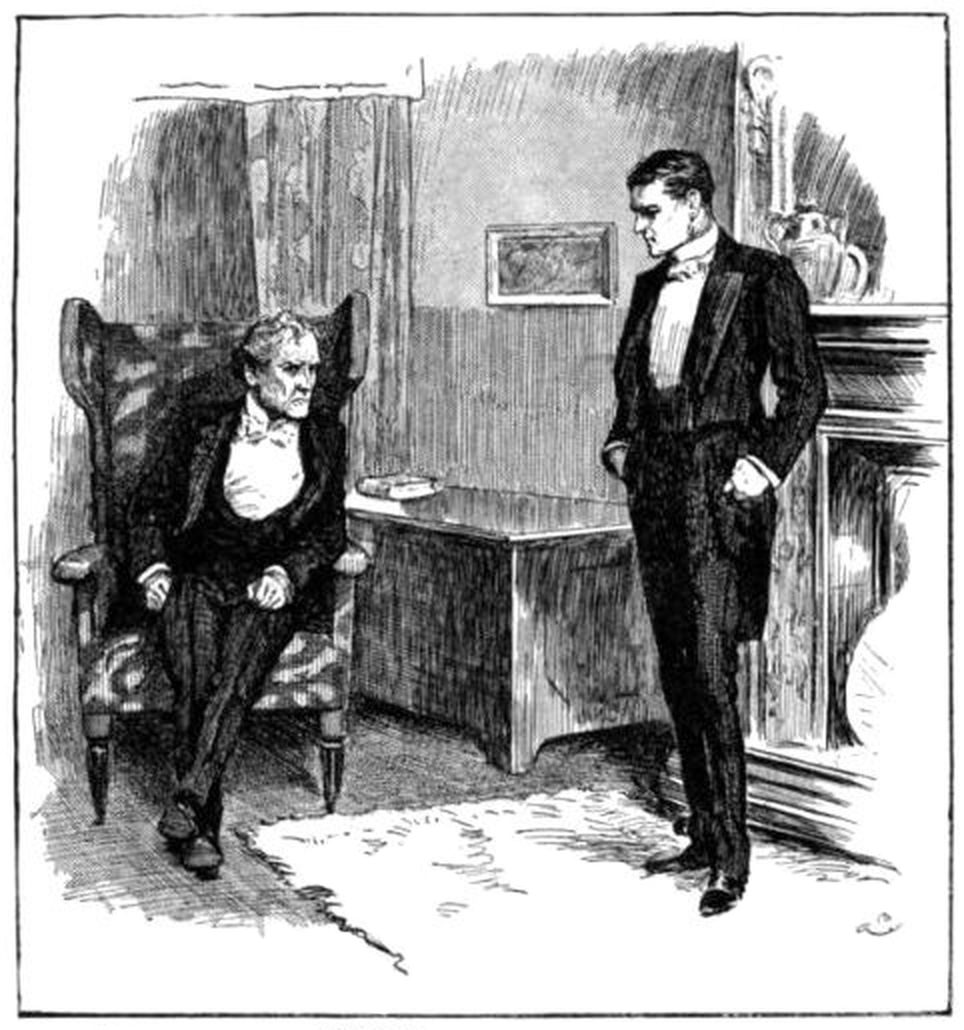
The smile faded from his face

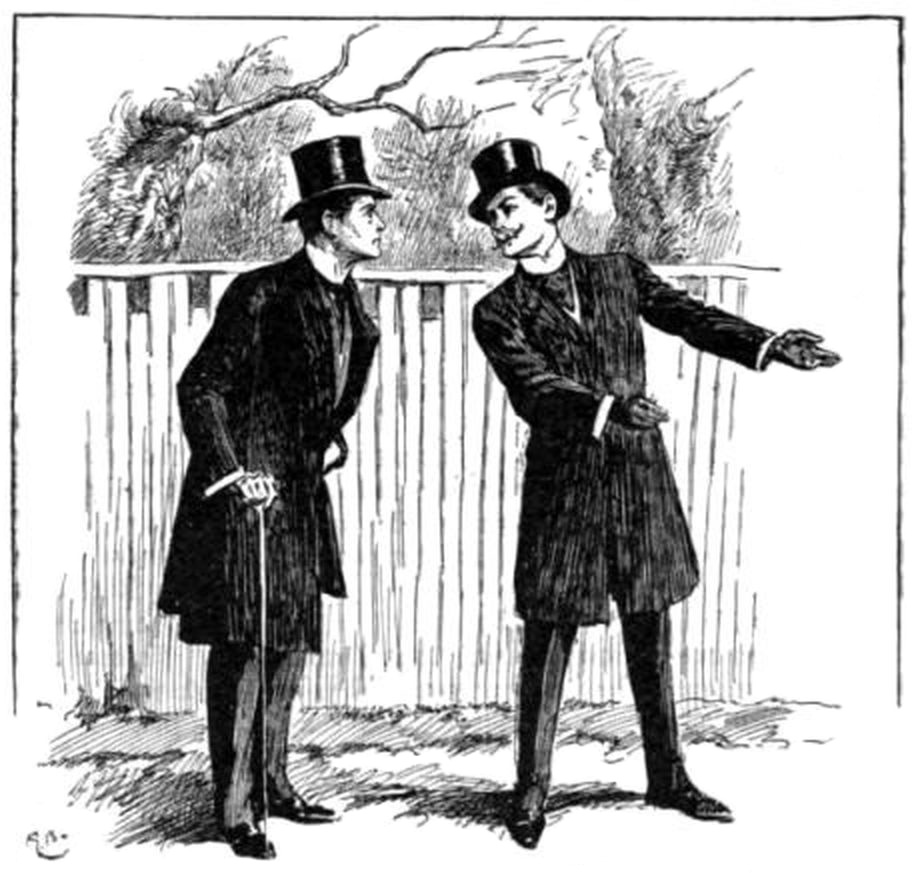
There is no help whatever in that direction

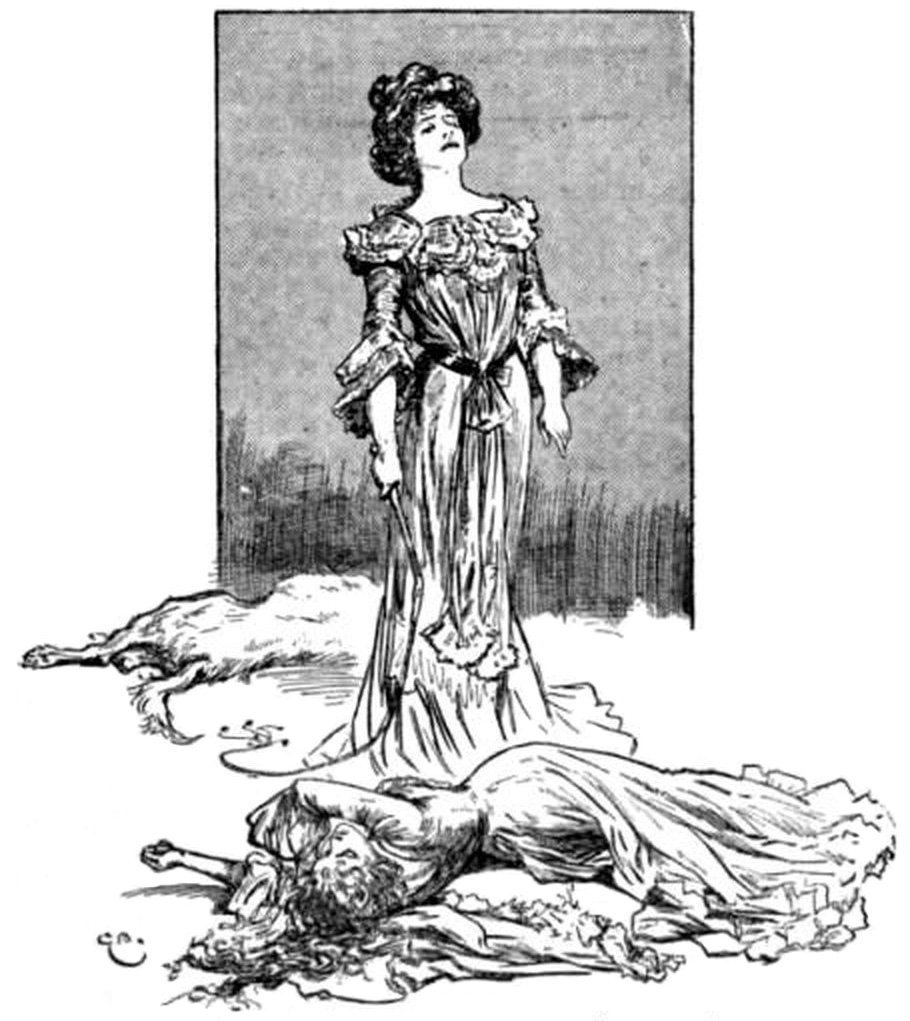
The great Madame Sara

== Death ==
Browne died on 27 May 1932 at his home at 4784 Upper Richmond Road in Richmond, Surrey. The cause of death was heart failure. His effects totalled £426 17s 9d.

== Assessments of Gordon Browne ==
Despite his talent, Browne never achieved the critical acclaim accorded to some of his contemporaries. Enormously painstaking and highly talented, he failed to equal the fame of his father only because his work appeared too widely and in cheap editions, so that he never became associated with a single significant author. Peppin and Micklethwait agree that his failure to achieve the fame of his father was due partly to him never becoming the lead illustrator for any author of note, and also because much of his vast output was published in very cheap editions. However, they concluded that on the grounds of energy, competence, reliability, and sheer volume he must be rated among the most important illustrators of his time.

Doyle concludes that: Gordon Browne's work over the years was so varied and full, so skilled, and of such a consistently high standard that praise would seem invidious. He was equally at home with character-drawing, action scenes or placid landscapes. His animals were as convincing as his people and his children were realistic and vigorous.

Houfe is less complimentary, and states that: He was clearly an artist who pleased editors and in this way there is a sameness about his work which dulls it: characters look very much alike whether they are Besant's or Henty's Kirkpatrick reports that James Thorp, in English Illustration: The Nineties (1935) says that: if he failed to achieve greatness it was due to the monotonous sameness of many of his illustrations, particularly in facial character...

Sketchley said that: ... on the whole, the stores illustrated by Gordon Browne are adequately illustrated. and goes on to say that he illustrates more from reality than from the imagination, and that his ideas of fairyland... are no less brisk and picturesque than are his ideas of everyday and of romance. Nevertheless, she concluded that his style It is a healthy style, the ideals of beauty and of strength are never coarse, wanton or listless, the humour is friendly, and if the pathos occasionally verges on sentimentality, the writer, perhaps, rather than the artist is responsible.

Richard Dalby wrote Gordon Browne. His prolificity averaged six books a year for nearly half a century. Many late Victorian writers, from Mrs Ewing to Henty and Fenn, had their stories illustrated.
