= Declan McKenna discography =

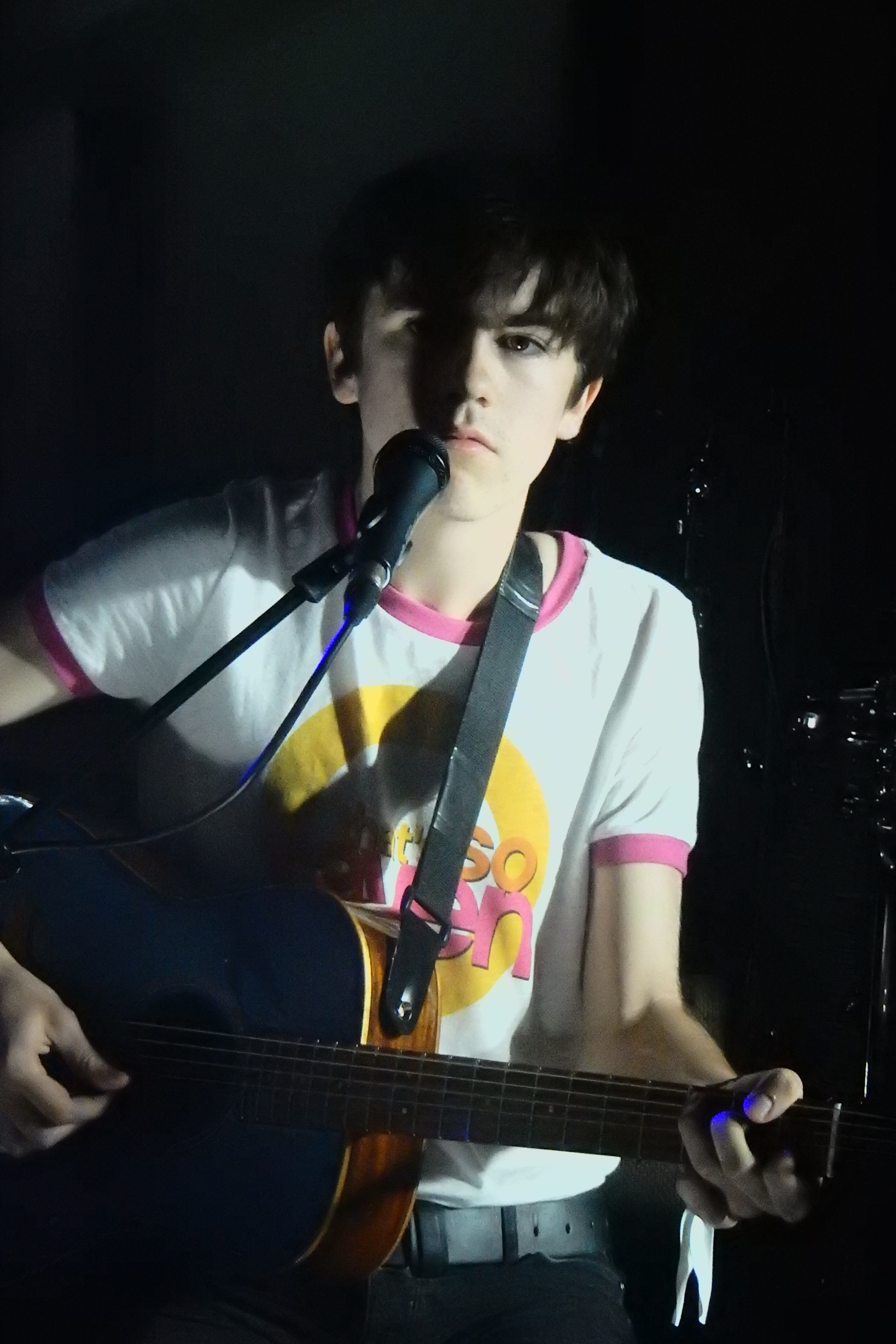
- McKenna at The Great Escape Festival in 2018
- Studio albums: 3
- EPs: 3
- Singles: 24
- Music videos: 22

This is the discography of English singer, songwriter, and musician Declan McKenna. His debut studio album, What Do You Think About the Car?, was released in July 2017. The album peaked at number eleven on the UK Albums Chart. The album includes the singles "Brazil", "Paracetamol", "Bethlehem", "Isombard", "The Kids Don't Wanna Come Home", "Humongous", "Why Do You Feel So Down?", "Make Me Your Queen" and "Listen to Your Friends". His second studio album, Zeros, was released in September 2020. The album includes the singles "Beautiful Faces", "The Key to Life on Earth", "Daniel, You're Still a Child" and "Be an Astronaut". In February 2024, he released his third studio album, What Happened to the Beach?, via his own record label, Tomplicated.

== Albums ==
=== Studio albums ===
List of studio albums
Title	Details	Peak chart positions						Sales	Certifications
Title	Details	UK	BEL (FL)	IRE	NLD	SCO	US Heat.	Sales	Certifications
What Do You Think About the Car?	Released: 21 July 2017; Labels: Columbia; Formats: CD, LP, download, streaming	11	130	26	136	8	7		BPI: Gold
Zeros	Released: 4 September 2020; Label: Columbia; Formats: CD, LP, download, streaming	2	—	9	—	2	9	UK: 40,110 (as of February 2024)	
What Happened to the Beach?	Released: 9 February 2024; Label: Tomplicated; Formats: CD, LP, download, streaming	3	—	6	—	1	23		
"—" denotes a recording that did not chart or was not released in that territory.

=== Other albums ===
List of other albums
Title	Details
Tribes	Released: March 1, 2014; Labels: Independent; Format: Digital download
I've Made It Further Than You (No, Not You)	Released: July 12, 2014; Labels: Independent; Format: Digital download

== Extended plays ==
List of extended plays
Title	Details
Stains	Released: March 4, 2016; Label: Because Music; Format: CD, LP, streaming
Liar	Released: May 20, 2016; Label: High Quality Popular Music; Format: Download, streaming
Regurgitated	Released: April 13, 2019; Label: Columbia; Format: 10" vinyl

== Singles ==
=== As lead artist ===
List of singles, with selected chart positions, showing year released and album name
Title	Year	Peak chart positions										Certifications	Album
Title	Year	UK	BEL (FL)	CZR	FRA	IRE	JPN	LTU Air.	LVA	SCO	US Rock	Certifications	Album
"Brazil" (original or Switch Disco remix)	2015	56	—	4	135	22	45	194	36	—	41	BPI: 3× Platinum	What Do You Think About the Car?
"Paracetamol"	2016	— (Note: "Paracetamol" did not enter the UK Singles Chart, but peaked at number 19 on the UK Physical Singles Chart.)	—	—	—	—	—	—	—	—	—		What Do You Think About the Car?
"Bethlehem"	2016	—	—	—	—	—	—	—	—	—	—		What Do You Think About the Car?
"Isombard"	2016	—	— (Note: "Isombard" did not enter the Flanders Ultratop Top 50, but charted as an "extra tip" on the Flanders Ultratop Bubbling Under chart.)	—	—	—	—	—	—	—	—		What Do You Think About the Car?
"The Kids Don't Wanna Come Home"	2017	—	84	—	—	—	—	—	—	—	—		What Do You Think About the Car?
"Humongous"	2017	—	—	—	—	—	—	—	—	—	—		What Do You Think About the Car?
"Why Do You Feel So Down?"	2017	—	—	—	—	—	—	—	—	—	—	BPI: Silver	What Do You Think About the Car?
"Make Me Your Queen"	2018	—	—	—	—	—	—	—	—	—	—		What Do You Think About the Car?
"Listen to Your Friends"	2018	—	—	—	—	—	—	—	—	—	—		What Do You Think About the Car?
"British Bombs"	2019	— (Note: "British Bombs" did not enter the UK Singles Chart, but peaked at number 11 on the UK Singles Sales Chart.)	94	—	—	—	—	—	—	—	—	BPI: Silver	Non-album single
"Brew (Regurgitated)"	2019	— (Note: "Brew (Regurgitated)" did not enter the UK Singles Chart, but peaked at number 24 on the UK Physical Singles Chart.)	—	—	—	—	—	—	—	95	—		Regurgitated EP
"Beautiful Faces"	2020	— (Note: "Beautiful Faces" did not enter the UK Singles Chart, but peaked at number 99 on the UK Singles Sales Chart.)	— (Note: "Beautiful Faces" did not enter the Flanders Ultratop Top 50, but charted as an "extra tip" on the Flanders Ultratop Bubbling Under chart.)	—	—	—	—	—	—	—	— (Note: "Beautiful Faces" did not chart on the Hot Rock Songs chart but did peak at number 38 on the Rock Airplay chart.)		Zeros
"The Key to Life on Earth"	2020	—	—	—	—	—	—	—	—	—	—		Zeros
"Daniel, You're Still a Child"	2020	—	— (Note: "Daniel, You're Still a Child" did not enter the Flanders Ultratop Top 50, but charted as an "extra tip" on the Flanders Ultratop Bubbling Under chart.)	—	—	—	—	—	—	—	—		Zeros
"Be an Astronaut"	2020	—	—	—	—	—	—	—	—	—	— (Note: "Be an Astronaut" did not chart on the Hot Rock & Alternative Songs chart but did peak at number 24 on the Adult Alternative Airplay chart.)		Zeros
"Rapture"	2021	—	—	—	—	—	—	—	—	—	—		Zeros
"My House"	2021	—	—	—	—	—	—	—	—	—	—		Non-album single
"Sympathy"	2023	—	—	—	—	—	—	—	—	—	— (Note: "Sympathy" did not chart on the Hot Rock & Alternative Songs chart but did peak at number 36 on the Alternative Airplay chart.)		What Happened to the Beach?
"Nothing Works"	2023	—	—	—	—	—	—	—	—	—	—		What Happened to the Beach?
"Elevator Hum"	2023	—	—	—	—	—	—	—	—	—	—		What Happened to the Beach?
"Slipping Through My Fingers" (ABBA cover)	2023	—	—	—	—	—	—	—	—	—	—		Non-album single
"Mulholland's Dinner and Wine"	2024	—	—	—	—	—	—	—	—	—	—		What Happened to the Beach?
"Champagne"	2024	—	—	—	—	—	—	—	—	—	— (Note: "Champagne" did not chart on the Hot Rock & Alternative Songs chart but did peak at number 35 on the Alternative Airplay chart.)		Non-album singles
"That's Life"	2024	—	—	—	—	—	—	—	—	—	—		Non-album singles
"—" denotes a recording that did not chart or was not released in that territory.

=== As featured artist ===
Title	Year	Album
"Projectdon'tdie" (Osquello featuring Declan McKenna)	2017	Non-album single
"Late to the Party" (Orla Gartland featuring Declan McKenna)	2024	Everybody Needs A Hero
"It Might Never End" (Adèle Castillon featuring Declan McKenna)	2025	Crèvecoeur
"Additional Driver" (Blossoms featuring Declan McKenna)	2026	Songs from the Wedding Cake

== Other charted songs ==
=== As featured artist ===
Title	Year	Peak chart positions	Album
Title	Year	EST Air.	Album
"Additional Driver" (Blossoms featuring Declan McKenna)	2026	69	Songs from the Wedding Cake

== Guest appearances ==
Title	Year	Artist	Album	Notes
"In Blue"	2019	—N/a	Moominvalley (Official Soundtrack)	
"Meet Me In Love"	2026	Blossoms	Songs from the Wedding Cake	Background vocals

== Songwriting credits ==
Title	Year	Artist(s)	Album	Written with
"Vincent Kompany"	2023	CMAT	Crazymad, for Me	Ciara Mary-Alice Thompson

== Music videos ==
Title	Year	Director	Ref.
"Brazil"	2014	Dan Stokes	
"Paracetamol"	2016	Matt Lambert	
"Bethlehem"	2016	John Merizalde	
"Isombard"	2016	Joel Knoernschild	
"The Kids Don't Wanna Come Home"	2017	—N/a	
"Brazil"	2017	Taz Tron Delix	
"Humongous"	2017	Taz Tron Delix	
"Why Do You Feel So Down?"	2017	Phil Poole	
"Make Me Your Queen"	2018	Niall O'Brien	
"Listen to Your Friends"	2018	Niall O'Brien	
"Brew (Regurgitated)"	2019	Diyala Muir	
"British Bombs"	2019	Ed Bulmer	
"Beautiful Faces"	2020	Will Hooper	
"The Key to Life on Earth"	2020	Will Hooper	
"Daniel, You're Still a Child"	2020	Will Hooper	
"Be an Astronaut"	2020	Huse Monfaradi	
"Rapture"	2020	Jocelyn Antequil	
"My House"	2021	Jake Passmore	
"Sympathy"	2023	Will Hooper	
"Nothing Works"	2023	Finn Kennan	
"Mulholland's Dinner and Wine"	2024	Jake Passmore & Henry Pearce	
"Champagne"	2024	Jake Passmore	
