= Mezzanine (disambiguation) =

A mezzanine is an intermediate floor between main floors of a building.

Mezzanine may also refer to:

== Art, entertainment, and media ==
- Mezzanine (album), a 1998 album by Massive Attack
- The Mezzanine, a 1988 novel by Nicholson Baker
- "Mezzanine", a track of the 2024 Album What Happened to the Beach? by Declan McKenna

== Business ==
- Mezzanine assets, digital assets created in an intermediate step, especially in the video and broadcast industry
- Mezzanine capital, a form of unsecured company financing; also "mezzanine fund": a fund combining bonds or debt-like instruments with stocks or equity

== Technology ==
- Mezzanine (CMS), a content management system
- Advanced Mezzanine Card, a specification of printed circuit boards
- Mezzanine, a thin sheet of plastic used to insulate different parts of circuitry from each other in cramped environments, such as laptop interiors
- Mezzanine board, or daughterboard, an extension of a motherboard
- PCI Mezzanine Card, a specification of printed circuit boards with a PCI bus
