= Blake Brockington =

American transgender activist (1996–2015)

- Born: May 14, 1996; Charleston, South Carolina, U.S.
- Died: March 23, 2015 (aged 18); Charlotte, North Carolina, U.S.
- Cause of death: Suicide by vehicular impact

Blake Brockington (May 14, 1996 – March 23, 2015) was an American trans man whose suicide attracted international attention. He had previously received attention as the first openly transgender high school homecoming king in North Carolina, and had since been advocating for LGBT youth and the transgender community, and against police brutality.

== Life ==
Brockington was born on May 14, 1996, in Charleston, South Carolina. He moved from Charleston to Charlotte, North Carolina, when he was 12.

Brockington, who was assigned female at birth, came out publicly as transgender while attending East Mecklenburg High School as a tenth grade student. His family was not supportive of his decision to transition, wondering why he would want to draw more attention to himself as a black youth. As a result, Brockington chose to live with a foster family during his transition. He chose the name Blake after it came to him in a dream and because he liked how masculine it sounded. He was taking testosterone, which was covered by Medicaid, and had planned to get a mastectomy once he was able to afford it.

He spent two years as a drum major for East Mecklenburg High School's band.

In 2014, Brockington received national attention for being the first openly transgender high school homecoming king in North Carolina after collecting the most money for East Mecklenburg High School's chosen charity ($2,555.55), Mothering Across Continents. He later indicated the process had been tough on him, saying, "That was single-handedly the hardest part of my trans journey. Really hateful things were said on the Internet. It was hard. I saw how narrow-minded the world really is."

After his election as homecoming king, he began publicly advocating for transgender and LGBT youth issues. He spoke at the 2014 Transgender Day of Remembrance service in Charlotte. In December 2014 at Charlotte's Independence Square, he organized a protest against police brutality against black people. He was involved with setting up an exhibit, "Publicly Identified: Coming Out Activist in the Queen City", at the Levine Museum of the New South in July 2014. Brockington was also mentoring transgender youth. He spoke in an 8-minute documentary made in 2014 by three Elon University students, "BrocKINGton", about his experience being bullied because he was transgender, and being hospitalized for self-harming.

He was active in the faith community, and participated in the Trans Faith and Action Network Conference held in Charlotte in August 2014.

Brockington was enrolled at University of North Carolina at Charlotte, majoring in music education. At the time of his death, he was on medical leave and not attending classes. He stated that his plans were to become a band director and composer.

== Death ==
Prior to his death, Brockington had indicated that he had experienced years of depression and destructive behavior, such as self-harming. He also indicated that he had previously had suicidal thoughts. Two months prior to his death, he posted on his Tumblr page "Even if I got better in my head, I would never want to continue on in a world like this." A month prior, he posted "I'm waiting on the moment when me and my darkness split from my body." One week before his death, he posted "being in my head is like being a quarterback playing against an entire defensive line." Finally, on the day of his death, he posted "I am so exhausted."

Brockington died on March 23, 2015, after being struck by several vehicles on the outer loop of Interstate 485 near Pavilion Boulevard in Charlotte. The incident was considered a suicide and was similar in nature to the suicides of Ash Haffner and Leelah Alcorn.

Brockington was buried in Ravenel, South Carolina, by his family on March 28, 2015.

== Reaction ==
In his obituary, Brockington's family, still unaccepting of his transgender identity, used she/her pronouns and referred to him by his deadname. Shortly before his death, he had told the media that he was not in contact with a lot of his family.

On March 24, 2015, the day after Brockington's death, about 100 people came to the North Davidson Street headquarters of Time Out Youth, where Brockington had been a client, to share stories and comfort each other.

Southerners On New Ground held a memorial service for Brockington in Durham, North Carolina, on March 28, 2015.

Three dozen members of the Charlotte community attended a memorial service for Brockington held on March 29, 2015, at Sacred Souls Community Church. Rodney McKenzie, the National LGBTQ Task Force's director of faith work, travelled from New York City to attend the service and remarked, "This is a loss for you all and a loss for our movement and our world. ... All of us were incredibly touched and incredibly sad. ... This is something touching all us, everywhere." Campus Pride's executive director, Shane Windmeyer, remarked at the service, "Days like today, the weeks recently, it hurts more and more. ... It is a tragic reminder of our duty as individuals to do more, to try better in changing lives and saving lives." Brockington's partner, Flo Ethier, read Brockington's favorite biblical passage, 1 Corinthians 13.

Many have noted that what happened to Brockington fits a dangerous pattern of harmful behavior toward transgender youth – who often face disproportionate amounts of bullying, harassment, discrimination, and violence. Josh Burford, assistant director for sexual and gender diversity at UNC Charlotte, who had worked with Brockington on the exhibit at the Levine Museum, told the press "What happened to Blake is part of a systemic problem, especially for trans students of color. He didn't quit. He didn't give up...He's a victim of what happens every single day to these kids."

Other memorial services were held in cities such as Minneapolis, Washington, D.C., and an additional service in Charlotte.

In 2018 the LGBTQ community archive project was officially named the "King-Henry-Brockington Community archive" to carry on the legacy of Blake's impact on the local Charlotte Community. Josh Burford, who had worked with Blake, decided to include Blake's name as a permanent reminder of his activism work.

== See also ==
- Suicide among LGBT youth
- List of suicides of LGBTQ people
- List of transgender people
