= Ren Hang (photographer) =

Chinese photographer and poet (1987-2017)

- Born: March 30, 1987; Changchun, Jilin, China
- Died: February 24, 2017 (aged 29); Beijing, China
- Known for: Photographs about nudity, gender and homosexuality

Chinese name
- Chinese: 任航
Transcriptions
Standard Mandarin
- Hanyu Pinyin: Rén Háng
- Wade–Giles: Jen^{2} Hang^{2}

Ren Hang (Chinese: 任航; March 30, 1987 – February 24, 2017) was a Chinese photographer and poet.

During Ren's incipient career, he was known mostly for nude photographic portraits of his friends. His work is significant for its representation of Chinese sexuality within a heavily censored society. For these erotic undertones, he was arrested by PRC authorities several times. He received the backing of the Chinese artist Ai Weiwei, who included Ren in his 2013 Netherlands show, Fuck Off 2 The Sequel, and curated the photographer's 2014 exhibition in Paris, France. "The images are fresh, but also empty and superficial. They contain a deep sadness within", commented by Ai Weiwei on Ren's artworks. Ren's erotic, playful and casual yet provocative expression gained him worldwide fame and recognition.

== Biography ==
=== Early life ===
Ren was born in 1987, in a suburb of Changchun, Jilin province, in northeastern China.

In 2007, in order to relieve the boredom of studying advertising at college, he bought a point-and-shoot camera and began photographing his friends. As a self-taught photographer, he said his style of photography was inspired by the artist Shūji Terayama.

=== Death ===
Ren suffered from depression. He posted a series of diary entries titled "My depression" on his blog, recording the fear, anxiety and internal conflicts he experienced. On January 27, 2017, which is also the eve of the Chinese New Year, Ren posted his last Weibo, saying that "every year my wish is always the same: to die earlier." Ren died by suicide on February 24, 2017, in Beijing.

== Works ==
=== Photography ===
Ren first began taking pictures of his roommates and friends in 2007, shooting them in the nude as all were close and seeking excitement. In an interview, he also admitted: "I usually shoot my friends, because strangers make me nervous." He arranged his subjects' naked limbs in his photographs.

Ren did not consider his work inappropriate: "I don't really view my work as taboo, because I don't think so much in cultural context, or political context. I don't intentionally push boundaries, I just do what I do." This may account for his reticence to limit his work to indoor settings. He said there were no preferred places for him to work, as he believed anywhere was beautiful and worthy to be shot, including sparse studios, parks, forests, and atop buildings. Ren's photos employ nude groups and solo portraits of men and women often contorted into highly performative positions. For example, hands reach down milky thighs, a limp penis flops onto a watermelon and a series of backsides imitate a mountain range.

Questioning the purpose of his work, he once stated that his creation was a way to seek fun for both photographer and the photographed. However, once he had reached fame on an international level, he began to think deeply about his work. The British Journal of Photography quoted him as once saying: "I don't want others having the impression that Chinese people are robots... Or they do have sexual genitals but always keep them as some secret treasures. I want to say that our cocks and pussies are not embarrassing at all." Ren also focused on gender-noncomforming and transgender people in Chinese society by 'indeterminating' sex and gender in some of his work: a group of naked bodies stacked together, people shot from behind, men wearing silk stockings and wearing lipstick. He denied having a preference in models: "Gender… only matters to me when I'm having sex." The international quarterly photography journal Aperture used his photo as the cover for its "Queer" theme. Commentators also see his work, the naked body and the starched penis, as evolving sexual mores and the struggle for creative and sexual freedom in a conservative, tightly controlled society. But Ren also announced "I don't try to get a message across, I don't give my works names, I don't date them. I don't want to instill them with any vocabulary. I don't like to explain my photos or work as a whole".

It has been mentioned that Ren's work is softcore pornography because of the degree of nudity and sex in it, but he also worked with other themes. The most famous was titled "My Mum". Although still under a fetishistic atmosphere, posing with usual props in Ren's works like animals and plants, Ren's mother posed as a clothed model, in a light-hearted way to represent her daily life. Ren's photographs have been included in magazines L'Officiel, GQ Style, and Vice. He worked with fashion companies Gucci, Rick Owens, and Loewe. Ren's work is included in Frank Ocean's magazine Boys Don't Cry.

Ren also kept a personal photo collection titled I Hate My Past and I Don't Want to Know My Future that featured portraits of every person he met, as well as ornaments like used condoms, hair, or mark-making to go with each photo.

=== Poetry ===
Ren published his first English translated collection of his poetry in January 2017 by BHKM, New York, which selectively contained his poems from 2007 to 2016 named Word or two, and a collection of poetry in Chinese by Neurasthenia, Taiwan, which contained his poems from 2007 to 2013 named Poem Collection of Renhang. This poetry is mainly about his enthusing emotions on describing the ideal love and life with lovers as well as the fear and loneliness when losing loves. The emotional erotic poetry usually comprises a handful of short lines, the tone ranging from humorous to sensual to dark. Here is an extract from a 2016 poem called Love:

Love

My kisses compactly join as a line, like the snake swims around each rugged reef on your trembling body, then you turn into the snake, I turn into the reef, and then we turn into snakes, intertwining together, we turn into reefs, striking each other.

Inside the bedroom filed with our fingerprints, those fingerprints keep enlarging, turn into growth rings, turn into mazes. We are lost with the whole world.

Ren Hang also expressed his homosexual experiences and identity in his poem collection published in 2016 by the independent publishing house EDITIONS BESSARD. Here is a poem written by Ren in 2008:

If You Were Homosexual

If I were heterosexual, then I'll have sex reassignment surgery

If I were gay, that would be so great

Throughout his life, he endured a long battle with depression, an experience he would often document on his website under a menu item titled My Depression. Here he recorded, sometimes in the form of poetry, his inner struggles against depression, including frequent hallucinations and hearing voices. In one poem, he wrote:

Gift

Life indeed is a
precious gift
but I often think

it seems sent to a wrong person

== Style and controversies ==
Ren Hang is noted to be greatly influenced by Chinese and Asian contemporary art and in particular, Japanese photographer and contemporary artist Nobuyoshi Araki, as well as the Japanese poet, film director, and photographer Shuji Terayama.

Ren Hang mainly worked with a simple point-and-shoot camera. He would direct the models as to how to place their bodies and shoot in quick succession. Genitalia, breasts and anuses were not covered up, but featured, or accentuated with props and close-ups. Colors were rich and high in contrast, increasing visual impact. This, along with the fact all bodies were slim, lithe and relatively hairless, made the impact of his photographs more impressive. His work communicated a raw, stark aesthetic that countered taboos and celebrated sexuality. Someone concluded it was this contemporary form of poeticism in a visual context in which Ren Hang expressed themes of identity, the body, love, loss and death.

Nudity is not a theme in art which can be widely accepted by the Chinese older generation. Ren Hang's works are sometimes misinterpreted by the public as pornography. Although some have written that Ren Hang used his photographs to challenge Chinese cultural norms of shame around nudity, he did not believe he was challenging the stereotype and leading a revolution. For him, nudity and sexuality are natural themes which he used in his work.

Nudes are there since always. We were born nude. So talking about revolution, I don't think there's anything to revolutionize. Unless people are born with clothes on, and I want to take their clothes off, then I think this is a revolution. If it was already like that, then it's not a revolution. I just photographed things on their more natural conditions.

He said he was not trying to liberate nudity and sexuality since he believed that the Chinese young generation was open-minded and less affected by the old-fashioned cultures. When Ren Hang talked about the question whether the topic of sexuality was still a taboo in China, he said:

I don't think it's related to our times, these are individual cases. Like how to say it, I think it depends on different people, it doesn't really relate to other things. I was not in the whole parents told you that you can only have sex if you get married era. The time when I grew up was already past that period, it was already different, everyone was already more relaxed.

== Movies ==
- I've got a Little Problem (2017) – documentary directed by Ximing Zhang, 44 min
  Trailer 1, Trailer 2,

== Publications ==
- Ren Hang 2009–2011. China: self-published, 2011.
- Room. China: self-published, 2011. Edition of 600 copies.
- Nude. China: self-published, 2012. Edition of 500 copies.
- Republic. Norway: Éditions du LIC, 2012. Edition of 500 numbered copies.
- Poem Collection of Renhang. Taiwan: Neurasthenia, 2013.
- My depression. China: self-published, 2013.
- Son and bitch. Taiwan: Neurasthenia, 2013.
- The brightest light runs too fast. France: Editions Bessard, 2013. Edition of 500 copies. Issued with signed C-Print.
- Physical borderline. China: ThreeShadows +3 Gallery, 2014.
- Food issue. China: Same studio, 2015.
- 野生 = Wild. Germany, Die Nacht, 2015. Edition of 600 copies. A collection of unbound posters "published in conjunction with the exhibition Ren Hang / 野生 at OstLicht Gallery, Vienna," 2015.
- New Love 新欢. USA: Session 6, Session Press, 2015. Edition of 500 copies.
- 上海游客 Shanghai Visitors. China: self-published, 2015.
- 海鲜派对 Seafood Party. China: self-published, 2015.
- 一月 January. China: self-published, 2016. Edition of 100 copies.
- 二月 February. China: self-published, 2016. Edition of 100 copies.
- March. China: self-published, 2016. Edition of 100 copies.
- April. China: self-published, 2016. Edition of 100 copies.
- May. China: self-published, 2016. Edition of 100 copies.
- June. China: self-published, 2016. Edition of 100 copies.
- July. China: self-published, 2016. Edition of 100 copies.
- August. China: self-published, 2016. Edition of 100 copies.
- September. China: self-published, 2016. Edition of 100 copies.
- October. China: self-published, 2016. Edition of 100 copies.
- November. China: self-published, 2016. Edition of 100 copies.
- Athens Love 雅典的爱. USA: Session 8, Session Press, 2016. Edition of 500 copies
- Word or two 只言片語. USA: BHKM, 2017.
- BAO. Sweden: Totem Collective in collaboration with Ren Hang, published posthum, 5. March 2017,

== Solo exhibitions ==
- In Addition to Sleep, Fotogallerie vaslisouza, Oslo, 2014
- Hide by Ren Hang, MOST 2414 & MOST Gallery, Soy Sauce Factory, Bangkok, 2014/15
- In Addition to Sleep, Copenhagen Photo Festival, Copenhagen, Denmark, curated by Fotogallerie vaslisouza, 2014
- The Wild, OstLicht, Vienna, Austria, 2015
- Ren Hang, 2014, Gallery Capricious 88, 88 Eldridge Street, 5th FL, New York, USA, March 6 – April 5, 2015
- #OccupyAtopos exhibition, part of the artist residency program, ATOPOS cvc, Athens, Apr 22 - Jun 17, 2015
- Athens Love, Klein Sun Gallery, New York, 2015
- Naked/Nude, Foam Fotografiemuseum Amsterdam, Amsterdam, 2017
- Human Love, Fotografiska, Stockholm, Sweden, 2017
- Ren Hang, posthum, Museum der bildenden Künste, Leipzig, Germany, coop. w. OstLicht, Vienna, 2017/18
- Love, Ren Hang, posthum, Maison Européenne de la Photographie, Paris, 2019; C/O Berlin, Berlin, 2019/20
- Ren Hang. Nudi, posthum, Centro per l'arte contemporanea Luigi Pecci, Prato, Italy, 2020

== Awards ==
- 2010: Third Terna Contemporary Art Award, Italy
- 2016: Outset|Unseen Exhibition Fund
