= Leelah Alcorn =

American transgender girl (1997–2014)

- Alcorn in 2014
- Born: November 15, 1997; Kings Mills, Ohio, U.S.
- Died: December 28, 2014 (aged 17); Warren County, Ohio, U.S.
- Cause of death: Suicide by vehicular impact

Leelah Alcorn (November 15, 1997 – December 28, 2014) was an American transgender girl whose suicide attracted international attention. Prior to her death, she had posted a suicide note to her Tumblr blog about societal standards affecting transgender people and expressing the hope that her death would create a dialogue about discrimination, abuse, and lack of support for transgender people.

Born and raised in Kings Mills, Ohio, Alcorn was assigned male at birth and grew up in a family affiliated with the Churches of Christ movement. At age 14, she came out as transgender to her parents, Carla and Doug Alcorn, who refused to accept her female gender identity. When she was 16, they denied her request to undergo transition treatment, instead sending her to Christian-based conversion therapy with the intention of convincing her to reject her gender identity and accept the gender that she was assigned at birth. After she revealed her attraction toward males to her classmates, her parents removed her from school and revoked her access to social media. In her suicide note, Alcorn cited loneliness and alienation as key reasons for her decision to end her life and blamed her parents for causing these feelings.

Alcorn used Tumblr's post queueing feature to publish her suicide note online several hours after her death, and it soon attracted international attention across mainstream and social media. Her parents, who defended their behavior by reference to their Christian beliefs, were severely criticized for misgendering and deadnaming her, and suppressing her identity. LGBT rights activists called attention to the incident as evidence of the problems faced by transgender youth, while vigils were held in her memory in the United States and United Kingdom. Celebrity tributes were realized for her, including songs and dedications, and multiple Twitter hashtags and other forms of online activism were formed. Petitions were formed calling for the establishment of "Leelah's Law", a ban on conversion therapy in the United States, which received a supportive response from then-president Barack Obama. Within a year, the city of Cincinnati criminalized conversion therapy.

== Life ==
"When I was 14, I learned what transgender meant and cried of happiness. After 10 years of confusion I finally understood who I was. I immediately told my mom, and she reacted extremely negatively, telling me that it was a phase, that I would never truly be a girl, that God doesn't make mistakes, that I am wrong. If you are reading this, parents, please don't tell this to your kids. Even if you are Christian or are against transgender people don't ever say that to someone, especially your kid. That won't do anything but make them hate them self [sic]. That's exactly what it did to me."

— Alcorn's suicide note

Leelah Alcorn was born in Kings Mills, Ohio, on November 15, 1997. She described herself as one of several children being raised in a conservative Christian environment; she and her family attended the Northeast Church of Christ in Cincinnati, and she had been featured in a profile of that church published in a 2011 article in The Christian Chronicle. As of 2014, the family lived in Kings Mills. According to her suicide note, Alcorn had felt "like a girl trapped in a boy's body" since she was four, and came to identify as a transgender girl from the age of 14, when she became aware of the term. She rejected the name she was given by her parents. When she signed her suicide letter, she first wrote her post-transition name between parentheses, then wrote her deadname, applying strikethrough to it, and lastly wrote her surname ordinarily. According to her note, she immediately informed her mother, who reacted "extremely negatively" by claiming that it was only a phase and that God had made her a male, so she could never be a woman. She stated that this made her hate herself, and that she developed a form of depression.

Alcorn's mother sent her to Christian conversion therapists, but Alcorn later related that there she only encountered "more Christians" telling her that she was "selfish and wrong" and "should look to God for help". Aged 16, she requested that she be allowed to undergo transition treatment, but was denied permission: in her words, "I felt hopeless, that I was just going to look like a man in drag for the rest of my life. On my 16th birthday, when I didn't receive consent from my parents to start transitioning, I cried myself to sleep." Alcorn publicly revealed her attraction to males when she was 16, as she believed that identifying as gay at that point would be a stepping stone to coming out as transgender at a later date. According to a childhood friend, Alcorn received a positive reception from many at Kings High School, although her parents were appalled. In Alcorn's words, "They felt like I was attacking their image, and that I was an embarrassment to them. They wanted me to be their perfect little straight Christian boy, and that's obviously not what I wanted." They removed her from the school and enrolled her as an eleventh grader at the Ohio Virtual Academy online school.

According to Alcorn, her parents cut her off from the outside world for five months as they denied her access to social media and many forms of communication. She described this as a significant contributing factor towards her suicide. At the end of the school year, they returned her mobile phone to her and allowed her to regain contact with her friends, although by this time, according to Alcorn, her relationship with many of them had become strained, and she continued to feel isolated. Two months before her death, Alcorn sought out help on Reddit, asking users whether the treatment perpetrated by her parents constituted child abuse. There, she revealed that while her parents had never physically assaulted her, "they always talked to me in a very derogatory tone" and "would say things like 'You'll never be a real girl' or 'What're you going to do, fuck boys?' or 'God's going to send you straight to hell'. These all made me feel awful about myself, I was Christian at the time so I thought that God hated me and that I didn't deserve to be alive." Further, she explained, "I tried my absolute hardest to live up to their standards and be a straight male, but eventually I realized that I hated religion and my parents." On Reddit, Alcorn also disclosed that she was prescribed increasing dosages of the anti-depressant Prozac. In concluding her post, she wrote, "Please help me, I don't know what I should do and I can't take much more of this." Alcorn's computer was recovered near the site of her suicide. It contained conversations showing that she had planned to jump off the bridge that crosses Interstate 71 days before the incident, but then contacted a crisis hotline and, as told to a friend, "basically cried [her] eyes out for a couple of hours talking to a lady there".

== Death ==
Prior to her death on December 28, 2014, Alcorn scheduled for her suicide note to be automatically posted on her Tumblr account at 5:30 pm. In the note, she stated her intention to end her life, writing:

I have decided I've had enough. I'm never going to transition successfully, even when I move out. I'm never going to be happy with the way I look or sound. I'm never going to have enough friends to satisfy me. I'm never going to have enough love to satisfy me. I'm never going to find a man who loves me. I'm never going to be happy. Either I live the rest of my life as a lonely man who wishes he were a woman or I live my life as a lonelier woman who hates herself. There's no winning. There's no way out. I'm sad enough already, I don't need my life to get any worse. People say "it gets better" but that isn't true in my case. It gets worse. Each day I get worse. That's the gist of it, that's why I feel like killing myself. Sorry if that's not a good enough reason for you, it's good enough for me.

She expressed her wish that all of her possessions and money be donated to a transgender advocacy charity, and called for issues surrounding gender identity to be taught in schools. The note ended with the statement: "My death needs to mean something. My death needs to be counted in the number of transgender people who commit suicide this year. I want someone to look at that number and say 'that's fucked up' and fix it. Fix society. Please." A second post appeared shortly after; titled "Sorry", it featured an apology to her close friends and siblings for the trauma that her suicide would put them through, but also contained a message to her parents: "Fuck you. You can't just control other people like that. That's messed up." An additional, handwritten suicide note reading "I've had enough" was found on her bed, but then thrown away by Alcorn's mother after police made a copy.

According to police, on December 28, Alcorn was walking along Interstate 71 near Union Township when she was struck by a semi-trailer just before 2:30 am near the South Lebanon exit. She died at the scene. It is believed that Alcorn walked three to four miles (five to six kilometers) from her parents' Kings Mills house before being struck.

By the morning of December 31, her suicide note had been reposted on Tumblr 200,000 times. Writing for The Boston Globe, reporter Maura Johnston described it as a "passionate post". The suicide note was later deleted after Alcorn's parents asked for it to be removed, and the blog was made inaccessible to the public. According to the family minister, the Alcorn family decided to hold the funeral privately after receiving threats. Alcorn's body was reportedly cremated. On April 30, 2015, the Ohio State Patrol ruled Alcorn's death a suicide.

== Reaction ==
=== Alcorn's parents ===
On December 28 at 2:56 p.m., Alcorn's mother, Carla Wood Alcorn, posted a public message on Facebook: "My sweet 16-year-old son ... went home to Heaven this morning. He was out for an early morning walk and was hit by a truck. Thank you for the messages and kindness and concern you have sent our way. Please continue to keep us in your prayers." [sic] Carla Alcorn's post, which included Leelah's deadname, was subsequently deleted. The Alcorn family publicly requested that they be given privacy to grieve in a statement issued by the Kings Local School District. In that statement, staff from Alcorn's former school, Kings High School, declared that "[Leelah] Alcorn was a sweet, talented, tender-hearted 17-year-old", adding that counselors would be made available to students affected by the incident. A moment of silence was held in Alcorn's memory before a Kings High basketball game on December 30.

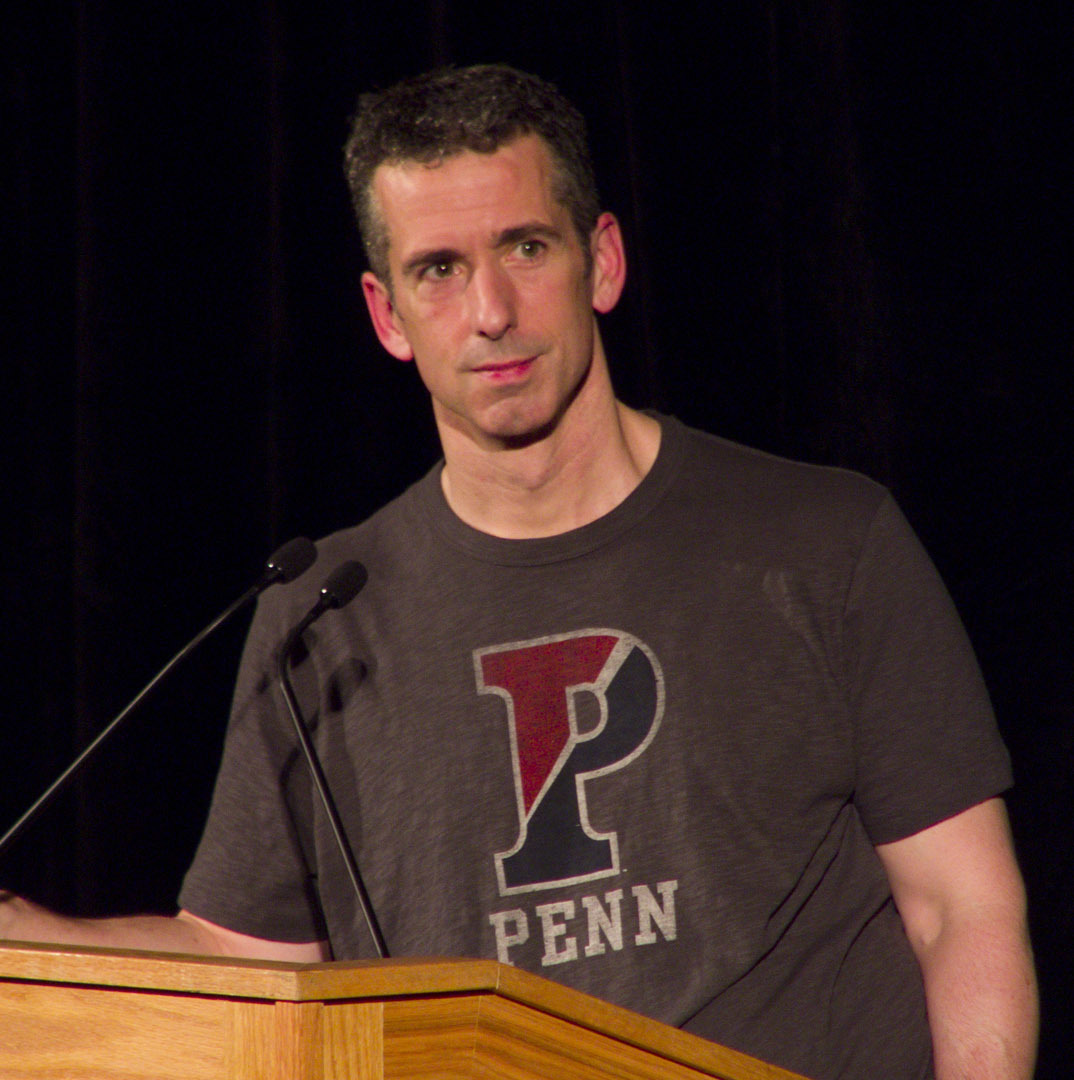
LGBT rights advocate Dan Savage (pictured in 2012) called for Leelah's parents to face legal prosecution in the wake of their daughter's death.

Some trans advocates publicly criticized Leelah's mother, Carla, for misgendering and deadnaming her daughter in the Facebook post announcing the teenager's death. Some individuals subsequently doxed and harassed Carla via her Facebook account "in revenge" for Leelah's death. On Twitter, American LGBT rights activist Dan Savage argued that Alcorn's parents should be prosecuted for their role in bringing about their daughter's death, commenting that through their actions they "threw her in front of that truck". He cited the successful prosecution of Dharun Ravi following the suicide of Tyler Clementi as a legal precedent for such an action. He added that legal action should also be brought against the conversion therapists who had counseled Leelah, and suggested that the Alcorns should lose custody of their other children.

Carla Alcorn responded to such criticism in an interview with CNN, stating: "But we told him that we loved him unconditionally. We loved him no matter what. I loved my son. People need to know that I loved him. He was a good kid, a good boy." Although acknowledging that Leelah had requested transition surgery, Carla stated that she had never heard her child use the name "Leelah", before reiterating her refusal to accept her child's gender identity, adding, "We don't support that, religiously." She expressed concern that users of social media thought her to be a "horrible person", but defended her actions in dealing with her child, stating for example that she had banned internet access to prevent access to "inappropriate" things. In an email to Cincinnati-based channel WCPO-TV, Leelah's father Doug Alcorn wrote, "We love our son ... very much and are devastated by his death. We have no desire to enter into a political storm or debate with people who did not know him. We wish to grieve in private. We harbor no ill will towards anyone. ... I simply do not wish our words to be used against us." [sic] Doug's message also included Leelah's deadname.

Writing for Salon, Mary Elizabeth Williams commented that "it would be cruel and inaccurate to suggest that Carla Alcorn did not love her child," but added that Carla's statement that she "loved him unconditionally" revealed "a tragic lack of understanding of the word 'unconditionally', even in death". People magazine quoted Johanna Olson, Medical Director for the Center of Trans Youth Health and Development at Children's Hospital Los Angeles, as stating that "Did Leelah's parents love her? Yes, I'm sure they did. Did they support her? No, they didn't. And that's a tragedy." Mara Keisling, the Executive Director of the National Center for Transgender Equality, was quoted as stating that the blaming of Alcorn's parents was unhelpful, adding, "Despite the great cultural and policy advances transgender people have made, there is still a lot of disrespect, discrimination and violence aimed at us. And being a child or a teenager of any kind today is very difficult."

=== Tributes, vigils, and activism ===
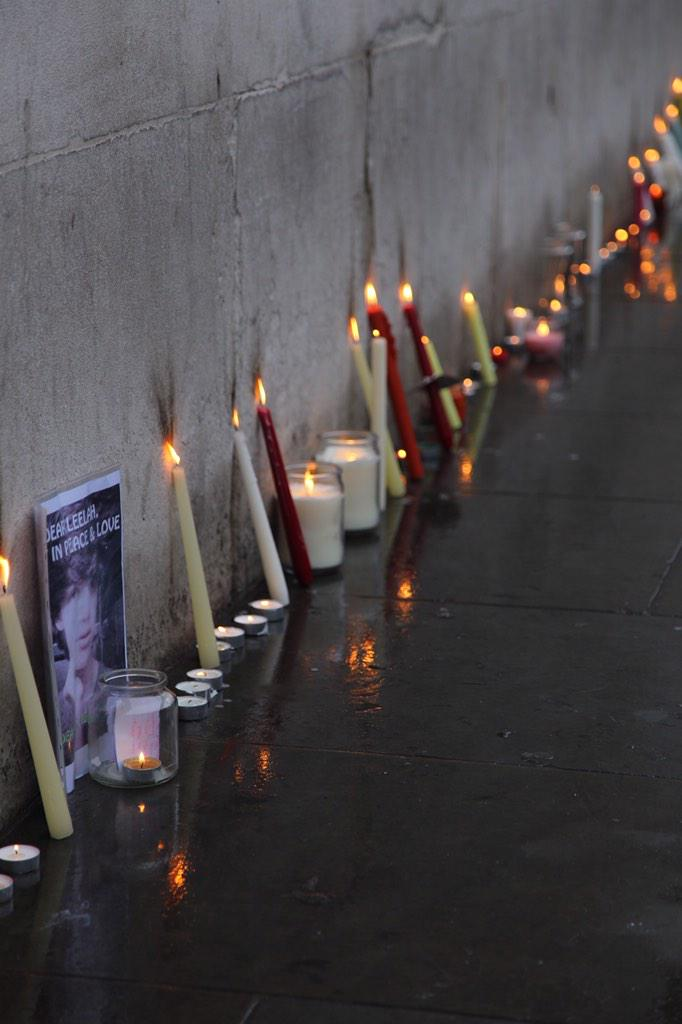
A memorial placed against a wall following the London vigil, January 2015

The day after Alcorn's suicide note was published online, Chris Seelbach, the first openly gay councilman on Cincinnati City Council, shared it as part of a Facebook message in which he stated that her death showed how hard it was to be transgender in the U.S. His post was shared over 4,700 times and increased public awareness of the incident. By December 30, Alcorn's death had attracted worldwide attention; news outlets across the world had picked up the story, and the hashtag #LeelahAlcorn had topped Twitter. According to British newspaper The Independent, the incident "triggered widespread anguish and raised a debate about the rights of transgender people." The U.S.-based Boston Globe stated that it "served as a flashpoint for transgender progress in 2014," while The New Republic referred to it as having "sparked a national conversation about the plight of transgender kids and the scanty rights and respect our society affords them."

On January 1, 2015, the Cincinnati-based LGBT rights group Support Marriage Equality Ohio hosted a vigil for Alcorn outside Kings High School. A candlelight vigil in Goodale Park, Columbus was held on January 2 by a group called Stand Up 4 Leelah. A further vigil was organized by The Diverse City Youth Chorus in partnership with the Cincinnati chapter of the Gay, Lesbian and Straight Education Network at the Clifton Cultural Arts Center for January 10. The vigil location at the Clifton Cultural Arts Center was changed to the larger Woodward Theater. The event was attended by over 500 people.

A January 3 vigil was scheduled for Trafalgar Square in London; an organizer was quoted as saying that "[Alcorn's] death was a political death. When a member of our community is brutalised at the hands of oppression we must all fight back." Those who spoke at the event included politician Sarah Brown and novelist and poet Roz Kaveney. Marches were carried out in honor of Alcorn in both Northwest, Washington, D.C. and Queen Street, Auckland on January 10. The same day, a candlelight vigil was held in New York City's Columbus Circle. A memorial protest against conversion therapy and in memory of Alcorn took place in Lynchburg, Virginia, on January 24, 2015.

Among the transgender celebrities who publicly responded to the incident were Janet Mock, Andreja Pejić, and Laverne Cox, while the musician Ray Toro released a song, "For the Lost and Brave," in dedication to Alcorn. Joey Soloway, the writer of the television show Transparent, dedicated their Golden Globe Award for Best Television Series to Alcorn. During Diane Sawyer's interview with Caitlyn Jenner, which confirmed Jenner's transgender identity, Alcorn was mentioned by name and the message "Fix society. Please," was broadcast. In June 2015, the singer Miley Cyrus founded the Happy Hippie Foundation, an organization to raise awareness of homelessness and LGBT issues among young people, partly in response to Alcorn's death. To promote the organization, she released a new series of Backyard Sessions videos, the second of which, Dido's "No Freedom", was dedicated to Alcorn. After reading about Alcorn's death, British musician Declan McKenna was inspired to write a song, "Paracetamol," which was included on his debut album What Do You Think About the Car? and discusses the media's representation of LGBT communities. In 2015, the nationwide non-profit organization Ally Parents, operated by Stand with Trans, was created in response to Leelah's death.

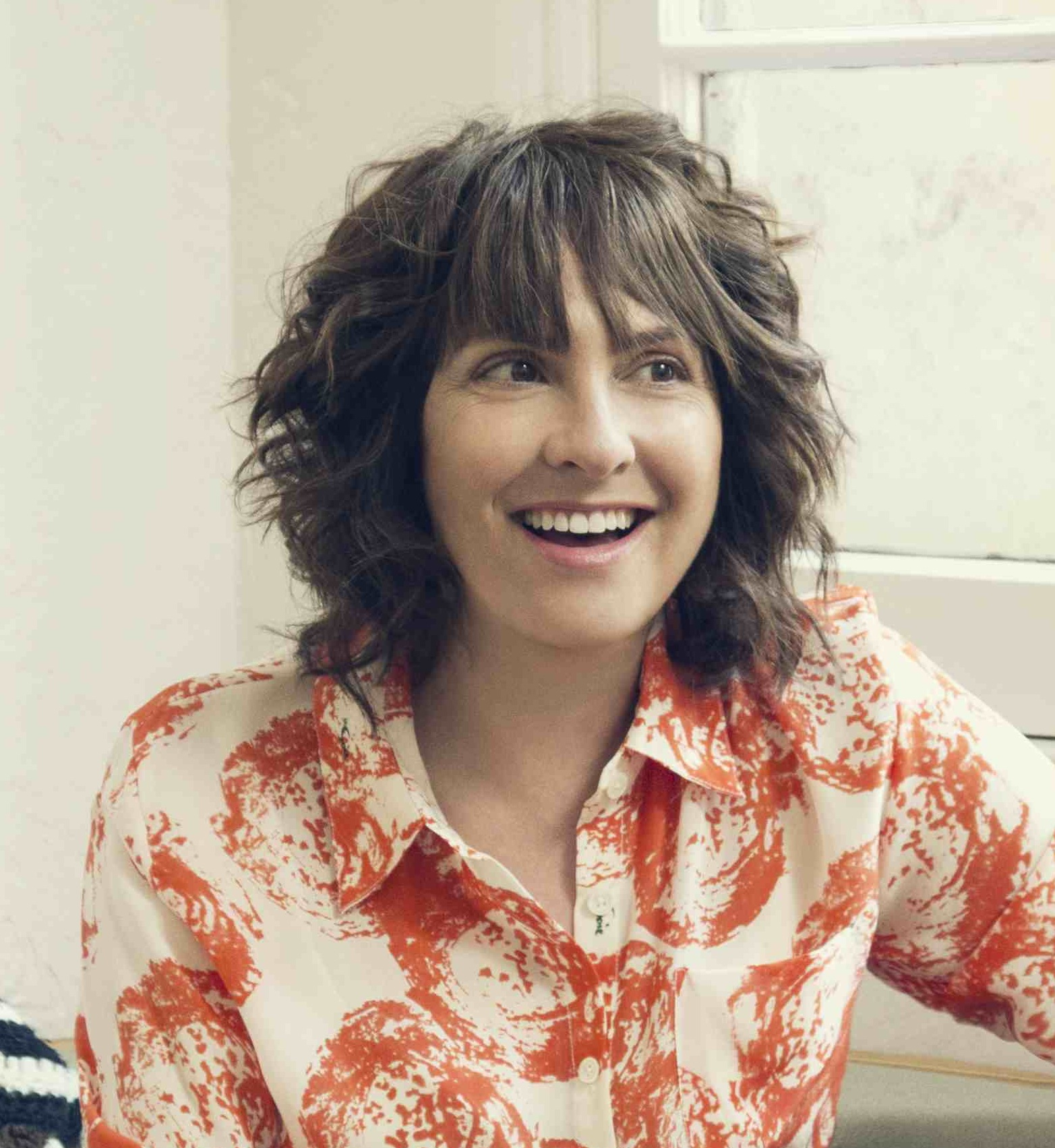
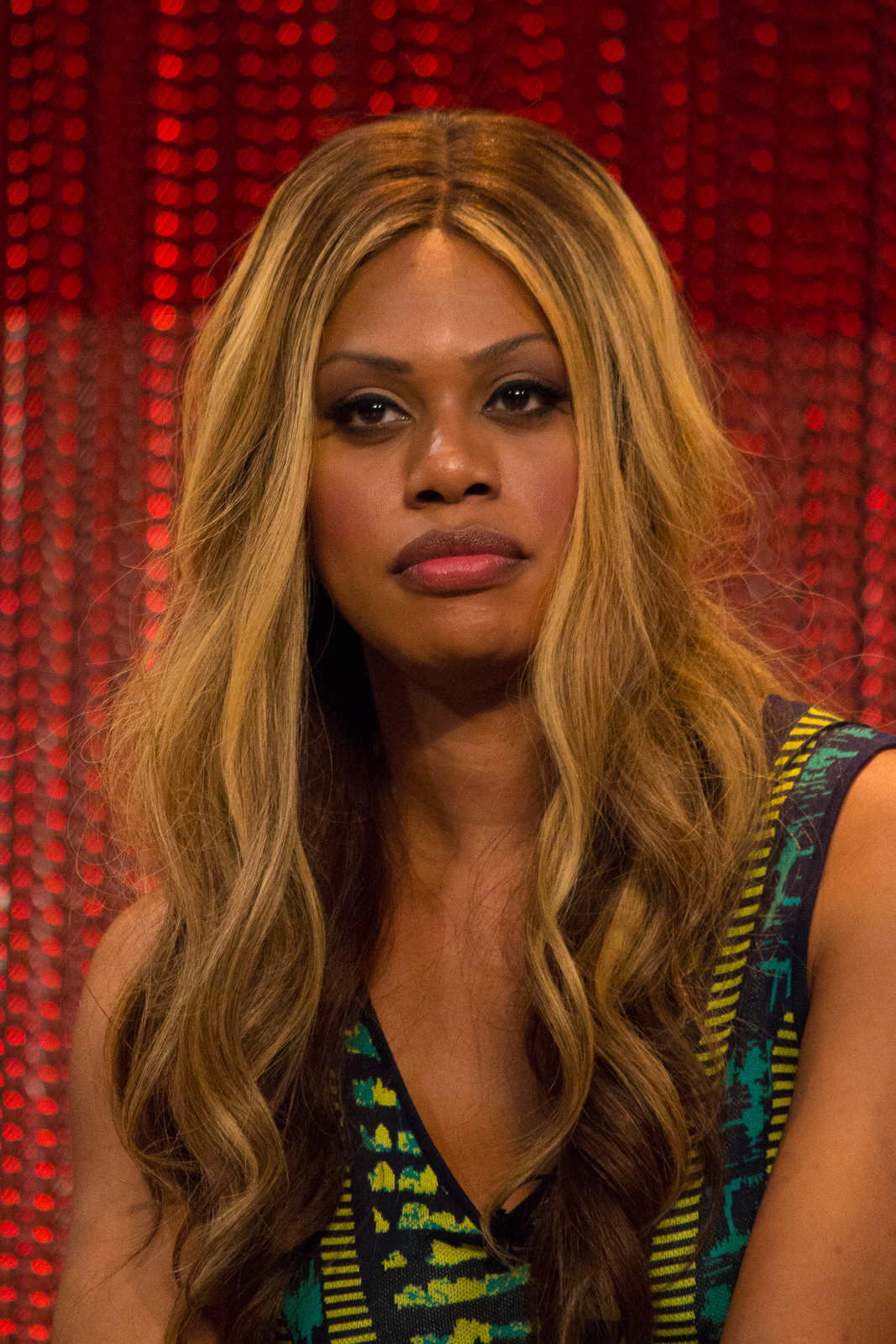
Celebrities such as Joey Soloway (left) and Laverne Cox (right) publicly responded to Alcorn's death.

Carolyn Washburn, editor of the Ohio newspaper The Cincinnati Enquirer, stated that the incident "raises important issues we hope will prompt conversations in families throughout our region." Washburn had also received letters that derided the newspaper's use of Alcorn's chosen name in covering her death. When contacted by The Cincinnati Enquirer, Shane Morgan, the founder and chair of transgender advocate group TransOhio, stated that while 2014 witnessed gains for the trans rights movement, Alcorn's death illustrated how "trans people are still being victimized and still being disrespected", highlighting the high rate of transgender people who had been murdered that year. Since the incident, TransOhio has received letters from parents of transgender children describing how Alcorn's death affected them. Morgan stated that while he understood the anger directed toward Alcorn's parents, "there's no excuse for threats to the family."

Allison Woolbert, executive director of the Transgender Human Rights Institute, informed The Independent that Alcorn's case was "not unique"; the newspaper highlighted research from the US Centers for Disease Control and Prevention indicating that LGBT youth are about twice as likely to attempt suicide as heterosexual, cisgender teenagers. Newsweek similarly placed Alcorn's suicide within its wider context of transphobic discrimination, highlighting that the Youth Suicide Prevention Program reports that over 50 percent of transgender youths attempt suicide before the age of 20, and that the National Coalition of Anti-Violence Programs had recently published a report indicating that 72 percent of LGBT homicide victims in 2013 were transgender women. Kevin Jennings of the Arcus Foundation also situated Alcorn's death within wider problems facing young LGBT people. In his view, she became "an international symbol of the ongoing challenges faced by LGBT youth," adding that her death "reminds us of a basic lesson still being taught to young people across America: When it comes to gender identity, it's best to be cisgender; and when it comes to sexual orientation, it's best to be straight."

Under the Twitter hashtag #RealLiveTransAdult, many transgender people posted encouraging tweets for their younger counterparts, while other hashtags, such as #ProtectTransKids, and the term "Rest in Power", also circulated on Twitter. A Change.org petition was set up calling for Leelah's chosen name to be included on her gravestone, which gained over 80,000 signatures. On January 6, Adam Hoover of Marriage Equality Ohio remarked that, since Alcorn's gravestone bearing her chosen name seemed "like a slim possibility", they would be raising money for a permanent memorial arranged as a bench, tree and commemorative plaque.

Under Ohio's Adopt-a-Highway program, a group adopted the interchange of Interstate 71 South and Ohio State Route 48—which was where Alcorn died—and dedicated it to her memory. As a result, the Ohio Department of Transportation erected signs stating "In Memory of Leelah Alcorn" along the road. Members of the group affixed a wreath to one of these signs; group member Lisa Oravec informed press that "We don't want Leelah to be forgotten... We want people in Cincinnati, or anybody driving down 71 to see the wreath. See the highway. If they don't know who Leelah is they'll Google it, educate it, and learn from what happened." As of December 2018, the "Leelah Alcorn Highway Memorial" group continued to meet four times a year to clean that stretch of road. The highway memorial formed the basis of a short documentary, Leelah's Highway, which was screened at the 2018 Cindependent Film Festival in Cincinnati's Woodward Theater. Its creator, Elizabeth Littlejohn of Toronto, stated that "as a human rights activist who believes [in] the right for gender self-determination, I believe this story needed to be told."

=== Leelah's Law ===
A Facebook group called "Justice for Leelah Alcorn" was established, while a petition calling for "Leelah's Law," a ban on conversion therapy in the United States, was created by the Transgender Human Rights Institute to raise awareness of the psychologically harmful effects of such practices. By January 24, it had 330,009 signatures, and was named the fastest growing change.org petition of 2014. A second appeal demanding the enactment of "Leelah's Law" was posted to the We the People section of Whitehouse.gov on January 3, 2015, which garnered more than 100,000 signatures as of January 30. In response to the petition, in April 2015, President Barack Obama called for the banning of conversion therapy for minors.

In December 2015, Cincinnati became the second U.S. city after Washington, D.C., to ban the practice of conversion therapy outright; council member Chris Seelbach cited Alcorn's suicide as an influence in the decision and stated that "she challenged us to make her death matter, and we're doing just that." By October 2018, four cities across Ohio had banned conversion therapy, leading journalist Nico Lang to comment that "the Buckeye State has become an unlikely leader in banning conversion therapy at the local level."

== See also ==
- List of LGBT-related suicides
- List of transgender people
- Blake Brockington, a trans man who died by suicide in similar circumstances.
