= Humongous (song) =

Single by Declan McKenna

from the album What Do You Think About the Car?
- Released: 9 June 2017
- Length: 5:12
- Label: Columbia Records
- Songwriter(s): Declan McKenna
- Producer(s): James Ford

Declan McKenna singles chronology
| "The Kids Don't Wanna Come Home" (2017) | "Humongous" (2017) | "Why Do You Feel So Down" (2017) |

"Humongous" is a song by English singer, songwriter, and musician Declan McKenna. It was released as the sixth single from McKenna's debut studio album, What Do You Think About the Car? on 9 June 2017 through Columbia Records. The song was written by Declan McKenna and produced by James Ford.

== Background ==
Talking about the song, McKenna said, "I love big powerful choruses that you can just scream, and I wanted this to be one of those. I remember writing it just sat home alone with my sister’s guitar in complete euphoria with only a chorus written and nothing else, just shouting the words which are super vague but just summed up all the confusion and frustration I’ve had the last two years."

== Live performances ==
On 11 April 2017, McKenna performed the song live on live on the late-night talk show Conan, which was shown on TBS.

== Music video ==
A music video to accompany the release of "Humongous" was first released onto YouTube on 9 June 2017.

== Personnel ==
Credits adapted from Tidal.

- James Ford – producer, drums
- Declan McKenna – composer, lyricist, associated performer, vocal
- Max Prior – assistant engineer
- Jimmy Robertson – engineer
- Barry Grint – mastering engineer
- Craig Silvey – mixing engineer

== Charts ==
| Chart (2017) | Peak position |
|---|---|
| Mexico (Billboard Ingles Airplay) | 44 |

== Release history ==
| Region | Date | Format | Label |
|---|---|---|---|
| Various | 9 June 2017 | Digital download | Columbia Records |
