= List of suicides of LGBTQ people =

This is a list of LGBTQ people who died by suicide. In order to be included in the list, either the person's death must have been widely reported by the media or they must have been notable in some way during their lifetime.

Name	Lifetime	Age	Location	Sexual orientation/ gender identity
Anannyah	1993 – 20 July 2021	28	Kerala, India	Trans woman
Justin Aaberg	9 March 1995 – 9 July 2010	15	Minnesota, US	Gay
Leelah Alcorn	15 November 1997 – 28 December 2014	17	Kings Mills, Ohio, US	Trans girl
Arsen	2005 – 20 October 2022	17	Yerevan, Armenia	Gay
Dante Austin	1992 – 9 June 2019	27	Philadelphia, US	Gay
Herculine Barbin	8 November 1838 – February 1868	29	Paris, France	Intersex lesbian
Zenon Bartlett	2000 – 6 September 2016	16	Winchester, England	Gay
Cody J. Barker	1993 – 13 September 2010	17	Wisconsin, US	Gay
Jadin Bell	4 June 1997 – 3 February 2013	15	La Grande, Oregon, US	Gay
Nex Benedict	2008 – 8 February 2024	16	Oklahoma, US	Transmasculine
Henry Berg-Brousseau	March 9, 1998 – 16 December 2022	24	Arlington County, Virginia	Trans man
Alexander Betts Jr.	1997 – July 2013	16	Des Moines, Iowa, US	Gay
Bhavesh	1996 – 21 January 2021	25	Surat, India	Gay
Boyd	1964 – 1 February 1989	25	Washington, D.C., US	Gay
Eric James Borges	1993 – 13 January 2012	19	California, US	Gay
Blake Brockington	15 May 1996 – 23 March 2015	18	Charlotte, North Carolina, US	Trans man
Asher Brown	1997 – 21 September 2010	13	Houston, US	Gay
David Buckel	June 13, 1957 – April 14, 2018	60	Batavia, New York, US	Gay
Loren Cameron	13 March 1959 – 18 November 2022	63	California, US	Trans man
Eylül Cansın	1992 – 5 January 2015	23–24	Istanbul, Turkey	Trans woman
Dora Carrington	29 March 1893 – 11 March 1932	38	Ham, Wiltshire, England	Bisexual or lesbian
Fred Caruso	1975 – 15 June 2016	41	Las Vegas, US	Gay
Raymond Chase	1991 – 2 October 2010	19	Rhode Island, US	Gay
Alana Chen	1995 – 9 December 2019	24	Colorado, US	Lesbian
Leslie Cheung	12 September 1956 – 1 April 2003	46	Hong Kong	Bisexual
Tyler Clementi	19 December 1991 – 10 September 2010	18	Piscataway, New Jersey, US	Gay
Simon Cremen	6 June 2021	38	Grimsby, England	Gay
Stephen Crohn	1947 – 24 August 2013	66	New York City, US	Gay
Andrew Cunanan	31 August 1969 – 23 July 1997	27	Miami Beach, Florida, US	Gay
Brad Davis	6 November 1949 – 8 September 1991	41	Los Angeles, California, US	Bisexual
Armanih Lewis-Daniel	1997 – 17 March 2021	24	London, England	Trans woman
Michał Demski	1990 – 26 June 2020	30	Warsaw, Poland	Gay
Denice Denton	27 August 1959 – 24 June 2006	46	Santa Cruz, California, US	Lesbian
Stockton Deussen	1999 – 27 June 2016	17	Utah, US	Gay
Thomas M. Disch	2 February 1940 – 4 July 2008	68	New York, New York, US	Gay
Daphne Dorman	1975 – 11 October 2019	44	San Francisco, US	Trans woman
Nova Dunn	2009 – 17 May 2023	14	Manchester, New Hampshire, US	Transgender
Simon Dunn	27 July 1987 – 21 January 2023	35	Sydney, Australia	Gay
Bryan Michael Egnew	1971 – 10 September 2011	40	Utah, US	Gay
Bernardo Elbaz	1984 – 10 November 2015	31	Brasília, Brazil	Gay
Jack Ellis	1995 – March 2014	19	Weston-super-Mare, England	Gay
Mpho Falithenjwa	2008 – 29 June 2022	14	Johannesburg, South Africa	Gay
Justin Fashanu	19 February 1961 – 2 May 1998	37	Norfolk, England	Gay
Harry Fisher	1988 – 12 February 2016	28	Utah, US	Gay
Aimée Flegeau-Kihal	1997 – 03 October 2020	23	Bures-sur-Yvette, France	Transgender
Avril Mabchour	2003 – 18 December 2020	17	Lille, France	Transgender
Elias Fritchley	2009 – 28 November 2021	12	Shelbyville, Tennessee, US	Gay
Wilson Gavin	1999 – 12 January 2020	21	Brisbane, Australia	Gay
William Toby Green	1997 – 12 December 2021	26	Cardiff, Wales	Gay
Robert "Bobby" Griffith	24 June 1963 – 27 August 1983	20	Portland, Oregon, US	Gay
Leia Sampson-Grimbly	2007 – 2024	17	London, England	Transgender
Ren Hang	30 March 1987 – 24 February 2017	29	Changchun, China	Gay or Bisexual
Robert Stewart, Viscount Castlereagh	18 June 1769 – 12 August 1822	53	Kent, England	Gay
Riley Hadley	2007 – 16 October 2019	12	Exeter, England	Gay
Ash Haffner	1998 – 26 February 2015	16	Charlotte, North Carolina, US	Transgender
Corei Hall	2009 – 12 October 2023	14	London, England	Trans boy
Kenneth Halliwell	1926 – 9 August 1967	41	London, England	Gay
Anjana Hareesh	1999 – 12 May 2020	21	Kerala, India	Bisexual
Zach Harrington	1991 – 10 October 2010	19	Norman, Oklahoma, US	Gay
Sarah Hegazi	1989 – 14 June 2020	30	Toronto, Ontario, Canada	Lesbian
Jaheem Herrera	1998 – 16 April 2009	11	Atlanta, US	Gay
Quentin Hubbard	6 Jan 1954 – 12 November 1976	22	US	Gay
Jamie Hubley	1996 – 14 October 2011	15	Ottawa, Canada	Gay
Ava Michal Hudson	1997 – 7 August 2024	27	Chicago, USA	Trans woman
Rebwar Ibrahimi	2002 – 8 February 2022	20	Marivan, Iran	Trans woman
William Inge	3 May 1913 – 10 June 1973	60	New York, New York, US	Gay
Roger Irons	1987 – 2 August 2008	21	Cornwall, England	Gay
Joseph Jefferson	1984 – 25 October 2010	26	New York, US	Gay
Jay Jones	1995 – 11 May 2012	17	Minnesota, US	Gay
Onyx John	2010 – 16 July 2023	13	Queensland, Australia	Trans boy
Felis Joy	2006 – 11 April 2022	16	Chișinău, Moldova	Trans girl
Ayden Keenan-Olson	1999 – 14 March 2013	14	Essex, England	Gay
Zachary Kirchner	14 August 2005 – 20 April 2021	15	York County, Pennsylvania, US	Gay
Adam Kizer	1999 – 26 May 2015	16	Sonoma Valley, US	Bisexual
Eden Knight	c. 2000– 12 March 2023	23	Saudi Arabia	Trans woman
Alice Litman	23 February 2002 – c. 26 May 2022	20	Brighton, England	Trans woman
Lizzie Lowe	2004 – 23 September 2018	14	Didsbury, England	Lesbian
Lucas Vermard-Claude	2010 – 07 January 2023	13	Vosges, France	Gay
Billy Lucas	1995 – 9 September 2010	15	Indiana, US	Gay
Lance Lundsten	1993 – 19 January 2011	18	Minnesota, US	Gay
Zander Nicholas Mahaffey	2000 – 15 February 2015	15	Austell, Georgia, US	Trans boy
Nazim Mahmood	1980 – 30 July 2014	34	London, England	Gay
Michael Maynes	1984 – 1 November 2014	30	Victoria (Australia), Australia	Gay
Sherin Celin Mathew	1996 – 17 May 2022	26	Kochi, India	Trans woman
Henry Stuart Matis	2 March 1967 – 25 February 2000	32	Los Altos, California, US	Gay
F. O. Matthiessen	19 February 1902 – 1 April 1950	48	Kittery, Maine, US	Gay
Milo Mazurkiewicz	27 January 1995 – 6 May 2019	24	Warsaw, Poland	Non-binary
Alexander McQueen	17 March 1969 – 11 February 2010	40	London, England	Gay
Lucy Meadows	1981 – 19 March 2013	32	Accrington, England	Trans woman
Mikayla Miller	2005 – 18 April 2021	16	Massachusetts, US	Lesbian
Patrick Milliner	1983 – 30 November 2013	30	Westbrook, Maine, US	Gay
Mary Millington	30 November 1945 – 19 August 1979	33	Walton-on-the-Hill, Surrey, England	Bisexual
Eric Mohat	1990 – 29 March 2007	17	Ohio, US	Gay
Jamel Myles	2009 – 21 August 2018	9	Denver, US	Gay
Praveen Nath	4 May 2023		Kerala, India	Trans man
Ela Nikbayan	November 1980 – 14 September 2021	40	Berlin, Germany	Trans woman
Alfredo Ormando	15 December 1958 – 23 January 1998	39	Vatican City	Gay
Pranshu	1997 – 21 November 2023	16	Ujjain, India	Queer
Josh Pacheco	24 October 1995 – 27 November 2012	17	Michigan, US	Gay
Tommy Page	24 May 1967 – 3 March 2017	46	Glen Ridge, New Jersey, US	Gay or Bisexual
Phillip Parker	1998 – 23 January 2012	14	Tennessee, US	Gay
Lincoln Parkin	1994 – 6 April 2016	22	Utah, US	Gay
Avinshu Patel	2000 – 2 July 2019	19	Mumbai, India	Gay
Aniket Patil	1994 – 27 June 2019	25	Mumbai, India	Gay
Arthur Pelham-Clinton	23 June 1840 – 18 June 1870	29	London, England	Gay or Bisexual
Mike Penner	10 October 1957 – 27 November 2009	52	Los Angeles, California, US	Transsexual
Tristan Peterson	2005 – 3 December 2017	12	New Jersey, US	Gay
Susie Pop	6 April 1975 – 23 November 2008	33	Madrid, Spain	Trans woman
Shailesh Raval	1988 – 11 October 2009	21	Ahmedabad, India	Gay
Jack Reese	1995 – 23 April 2012	17	Utah, US	Gay
Salvador Rios	2009 – 15 August 2023	14	San Diego, US	Gay
Jamey Rodemeyer	21 March 1997 – 18 September 2011	14	Buffalo, New York, US	Bisexual
Jacob Rogers	1993 – 7 December 2011	18	Tennessee, US	Gay
Roshan	2003 – 19 March 2018	15	Riyadh, Saudi Arabia	Gay
Neelotpol Sarkar	1991 – 12 February 2018	27	Bhopal, India	Gay
İsa Şahmarlı	ca.1993 – 22 January 2014	20	Baku, Azerbaijan	Gay
Nigel Shelby	2004 – 18 April 2019	15	Alabama, US	Gay
Elisa Rae Shupe	10 August 1963 – 27 January 2025	61	Syracuse, New York, US	Trans woman
Hershel Siegel	1998 – 5 May 2023	25	Atlanta, US	Gay
Channing Smith	2003 – 23 September 2019	16	Tennessee, US	Bisexual
Lia Smith	March 7, 2004 – October 18, 2025	21	Cornwall, US	Transgender
Michael Smith	1994 – 7 July 2016	22	Atlanta, US	Gay
Mahesh Soni	1987 – 2 October 2011	24	Mumbai, India	Gay
Alan Stafford	1961 – 29 January 2019	58	Portsmouth, England	Gay
Jeff Thomas	1988 – 8 March 2023	35	Miami, US	Gay
Tigran	2005 – 20 October 2022	17	Yerevan, Armenia	Gay
Tonino	1975 – 9 July 2015	40	Foggia, Italy	Gay
Alan Turing	23 June 1912 – 7 June 1954	41	Cheshire, England	Gay
Tyrone Unsworth	16 August 2003 – 22 November 2016	13	Brisbane, Australia	Gay
Cherry Valentine	30 November 1993 – 18 September 2022	28	Darlington, England	Genderfluid
Ashok Valmik	1989 – 11 October 2009	20	Ahmedabad, India	Gay
Carl Joseph Walker	1998 – 14 April 2009	11	Springfield, Massachusetts, US	Gay
Seth Walsh	1997 – 19 September 2010	13	California, US	Gay
Will X. Walters	1981 – 29 December 2016	35	San Diego, US	Gay
Kevin Ward	1978 – 25 January 2022	44	Hyattsville, Maryland, US	Gay
Cameron Warwick	2003 – 4 September 2019	16	Fareham, England	Gay
Kenneth Weishuhn	27 May 1997 – 15 April 2012	14	Paullina, Iowa, US	Gay
James Whale	22 July 1889 – 29 May 1957	67	Hollywood, California, US	Gay
Jim Wheeler	1978–1997	19	Lebanon, Pennsylvania, US	Gay
Robert White	1941 – 29 May 1985	44	Northern California, US	Gay
Kyaw Zin Win	1993 – 27 June 2019	26	Yangon, Myanmar	Gay
Kim Ji-who	1985– 7 October 2008	23	Seoul, South Korea	Gay
Carlos Vigil	1996 – 19 July 2013	17	New Mexico, US	Gay
Tyree Williams	31 October 2019		Camden, New Jersey, US	Gay
Tobi Wong	10 June 1974 – 30 May 2010	35	New York, New York, US	Gay
Gao Yan	2003 – 10 September 2022	19	Shandong, China	Gay

== See also ==
- Suicide among LGBTQ youth
- Suicide prevention
  - It Gets Better Project
  - Lesbian Gay Bi Trans Youth Line
  - The Trevor Project
  - Trans Lifeline
