= Turkish Psychological Association =

The Turkish Psychological Association (in Turkish, Türk Psikologlar Dernegi; acronym is the TPD) was founded in 1976. Its headquarters is in Ankara, Turkey.

== Objectives, ethics and projects ==
The TPD follows several main objectives:

- Providing help to psychologists and psychology organizations to reach contemporary level
- Protecting the professional rights of Psychologists and solving their problems in Turkey
- Facilitating union, unity and cooperation between psychologists in Turkey
- Facilitating the contribution of psychology science to the public benefit
- Identifying the ethical standards for the profession and maintaining these standards in the highest level

Its code of ethics was adopted in 2004. It was created by Yesim Korkut (PhD), Serra Muderrisoglu (PhD) and Melis Tanik (PsyD) in Istanbul.

=== The LGBTI Force ===
In June 2014, the TPD launched a special unit to protect LGBT citizens from homophobia, transphobia and other forms of discrimination in society that LGBT individuals face. This unit is called the LGBTI Force. The unit hosts fundraisers, projects and meetings to spread awareness of discrimination and promote a stance against conversion of LGBT citizens. Its first meeting was 29 June 2014.

Following the suicide of Turkish transgender sex worker Eylül Cansın on 5 January 2015, the LGBTI Force released a concerned announcement of how one widely broadcast suicide often leads to more suicides, especially among adolescents and young adults. At their young age, depression and suicidal thoughts and/or actions are often considered "contagious", in a way. It encouraged the media to avoid detailed descriptions of Eylül's suicide so as to prevent the cultivation of ideas in any of the viewers' minds.
