= Suicide of Eylül Cansın =

Suicide of Turkish sex worker

Eylül Cansın's Suicide
- Date: 5 January 2015
- Venue: Bosphorus Bridge
- Location: Istanbul, Turkey
- Type: Suicide
- Cause: Societal discrimination, exploitation, lack of support
- Outcome: Protests, increased awareness of transgender issues in Turkey
- Burial: Feriköy Cemetery, Istanbul

Eylül Cansın (1992 – 5 January 2015) was a 23 year old Turkish trans woman who died by suicide after jumping off the Bosphorus Bridge in Istanbul, Turkey, despite police's attempts to prevent her from jumping. She died on impact. Shortly before her death, she posted a suicide note video in Turkish on her Facebook.

According to journalist Michelle Demishevich, Cansın had been exploited by a gang and forced to engage in sex work. She was buried at the Feriköy Cemetery in Istanbul. Following her suicide, protests stating that her death was murder by society were held in Turkish cities like Ankara, Istanbul, and İzmir. The protests shed light on Turkish police brutality, gang violence towards trans sex workers, and low employment rates for trans citizens.

Social media was outraged by her suicide and sparked more uproar for international LGBT equality in society. The Turkish Psychological Association (TPD) was concerned that her suicide could spark more suicides in Turkish LGBT youth. It said that it was critical that detailed explanations of the death should be avoided, as it was likely to become a role model for adolescents and young adults, who are the most inclined to depression and suicidal actions.

== See also ==
- List of LGBT-related suicides
- Transgender inequality
- LGBT rights in Turkey
