= Labour Live =

2018 British music and politics festival

Labour Live was a one-day festival of music and politics in London, United Kingdom, taking place in June 2018, organised by the Labour Party to capitalise on the appearance of the party's then-leader Jeremy Corbyn at Glastonbury Festival in summer 2017, promote the public image of the party and of Corbyn himself. Labour described it as an event 'to bring our incredible movement together'.

== Acts ==
With regards to music, Clean Bandit headlined the festival, and other acts included Glen Matlock, Declan McKenna, DVTN, Feminist Jukebox, Hookworms, Jermain Jackman, Rae Morris, Potent Whisper, Nia Wyn, Reverend and The Makers, Sam Fender, She Drew The Gun, and The Magic Numbers.

Politicians speaking included Leader of the Opposition Jeremy Corbyn, the then-Shadow Secretary of State for International Development Kate Osamor, and Shadow Chancellor John McDonnell.

Other speakers included The Guardian columnist and author Owen Jones, journalist and author Alex Nunns, journalist and author Rachel Shabi, and journalist and author Maya Goodfellow.

== Attendance and finances ==
The festival was reported to cost approximately £1 million.

Tickets to the event were originally priced at £35 for adults, £30 for concessions and £10 for children. Before the event, however, the price was reduced to £10, with under-14s attending free of charge. The festival was criticised for its low attendance, with only 3,000 tickets of the 20,000 capacity being sold according to 'insiders' while other estimates put the figure at 4,000. A month before the festival, the Huffington Post reported that only 15% of available tickets had been sold.

It was reported in 2019 that the festival was one of the causes of the Labour Party's funds being low. When questioned by former National Executive Committee member Johanna Baxter in 2018 at Labour conference, party treasurer Diana Holland confirmed that the event did not make a profit, stating that she did not "think that was why it was organised", also adding that the party's reserve funds paid for the shortfall in costs, with general election funds untouched.
