= St Mary's Church of England High School =

Coordinates: 51.6960°N 0.0556°W

Location
- Lieutenant Ellis Way; Cheshunt, Hertfordshire, EN7 5FB; England

Information
- Type: Academy
- Motto: Everyone is equal: everyone deserves the best.
- Religious affiliation: Church of England
- Established: 1958
- Department for Education URN: 138360 Tables
- Ofsted: Reports
- Head Teacher: Richard Vaughan
- Gender: Mixed
- Age: 11 to 19
- Enrolment: 1,011 as of March 2016
- Houses: Turing; Franklin; King; Seacole
- Website: http://www.st-maryshigh.herts.sch.uk/

St Mary's Church of England High School is a mixed secondary school and sixth form located in Cheshunt, Hertfordshire, England. It is a Church of England school under the direction of the Diocese of St Albans.

St Mary's High School was previously located next to the Church of St Mary the Virgin in Cheshunt, but moved to a new site in the town in April 2010. The school converted to academy status in August 2012.

St Mary's High School offers GCSEs as courses of study for pupils, with A Levels offered in the sixth form. Some vocational courses are also offered in conjunction with Hertford Regional College.

== History ==
The school was established in 1958, on a site adjacent to the Church of St Mary the Virgin in Cheshunt.

Construction on a new site off Lieutenant Ellis Way began in 2008, with completion in 2010. The project cost over £33 million. A memorial to those who died in the crash of a B24 US Bomber in 1944 was built on the school's approach road.

The Paul Cully Bridge opened in May 2011 on the A10, connecting the school and Bury Green to Waltham Cross. This improved access for more students to attend the school from across North London, utilising local bus and train services available from the eastern side of the A10.

In 2012, the school converted to Academy Status.

In 2015, the school opened a new area north-west of the building. It contains humanities, science and textiles classrooms.

== Notable former pupils ==
- Lady Beckham (née Victoria Adams), former member of the Spice Girls
- Declan McKenna, singer/songwriter and winner of the 2015 Glastonbury Festival Emerging Talent Contest

== Notable former faculty ==
- Katherine Jenkins, singer.

== Former Headteachers ==
- Stephanie Benbow (April 2004 – August 2019)
- Nicholas Simms (September 2019 – December 2023)
