= Switch Disco =

British DJ duo

Switch Disco is a British DJ duo consisting of Dan Creasy and Nikos Kalogerias. Their 2021 single, "Everything", was used in the opening scene of the first episode of the seventh series of Love Island, and their 2023 single with Ella Henderson, "React", charted at No. 4 on the UK Singles Chart and was certified platinum by the British Phonographic Industry.

== Career ==
Dan Creasy and Nikos Kalogerias (Daniel John Creasy and Nikolaos Kalogerias) met via mutual friends who were running a club in Zakynthos where Kalogerias was from. They completed a summer season together before forming a duo together the following year. They played mash-up sets for several years; one of their mash-ups, of Nelly Furtado's "Say It Right" and Bicep's "Glue", caught the attention of Relentless Records, who signed them. In 2021, the pair released "Everything", which samples Donna Lewis' "I Love You Always Forever"; the pair opted to sample the record after playing the song at the end of one of their DJ sets, and deciding to do something with it. The song was used in the opening scene of the first episode of the seventh series of Love Island, which caused its Spotify streams to increase by 185 percent.

In 2023, having previously released several mashups using "Children" by Robert Miles, the pair released "React", a collaboration with Ella Henderson, which heavily sampled the song. The song charted at No. 4 on the UK Singles Chart and was certified platinum by the British Phonographic Industry. The song was in the charts at the same time as "Closer" by Bou featuring Slay, which also sampled "Children", and became popular at a time when sampling 1990s hits had become the norm. They later released a music video for the song, and performed the track on the ninth series of Love Island's Reunion show with Nonô. In February 2024, they released "Sleep Tonight" with Sam Feldt and R3hab, which sampled Amy Macdonald's "This Is the Life".

== Discography ==
=== Extended plays ===
Title	Details
Vacancy	Released: 15 December 2023; Label: Relentless Records; Formats: Digital download, streaming

=== Singles ===
List of singles as a lead artist, with selected chart positions, certifications, and album name
Title	Year	Peak chart positions			Certifications	Album
Title	Year	UK	UK Dance	TUR	Certifications	Album
"Everything"	2021	— (Note: "Everything" did not enter the UK Singles Chart, but peaked at number 23 on the UK Singles Sales Chart.)	—	—		Non-album single
"React" (with Ella Henderson)	2023	4	2	—	BPI: Platinum	Vacancy
"Ease My Mind" (with Autograf)	2023	—	—	—		Vacancy
"What You Want"	2023	—	—	—		Vacancy
"Vacancy"	2023	— (Note: "Vacancy" did not enter the UK Singles Chart, but peaked at number 24 on the UK Singles Sales Chart.)	—	—		Vacancy
"Sleep Tonight (This Is the Life)" (with R3hab and Sam Feldt)	2024	—	—	2		Non-album singles
"Under the Sun" (with Ella Henderson and Alok)	2024	—	—	—		Non-album singles
"I Found You" (with Charlotte Haining and Felix)	2024	—	—	—		Non-album singles
"2 Hearts" (with Glockenbach featuring Jem Cooke)	2025	—	—	—		Non-album singles
"Hideaway" (with Tones and I)	2025	—	—	—		Non-album singles
"BREATHE" (featuring NEVE)	2025	—	—	—		Non-album singles
"Empty Skies" (with Korolova)	2026	—	—	—		Non-album singles
"Brazil" (with Declan McKenna)	2026	—	—	—		Non-album singles
"Voices"	2026	—	—	—		Non-album singles
"All I Need"	2026	—	—	—		Non-album singles
"—" denotes a recording that did not chart or was not released in that territory.
