= Matt Lambert =

American filmmaker and photographer

Matt Lambert is an American, Berlin-based filmmaker, creative director and photographer working across film, television, fashion, advertising, music and performance.

== Biography ==
Matt Lambert is a Berlin-based filmmaker, photographer, creative director, and curator whose work centres around intimacy, queer history and contemporary identity.

He has exhibited work at Tate Britain, Munch Museum, Volksbühne Berlin, British Film Institute, Julia Stoschek Collection and upcoming at NRW Forum and Palais Galeria.

Lambert's work has been reviewed and published in publications, including i-D and 032c, Dazed & Confused Magazine, and he regularly collaborates with brands such as Calvin Klein, Diesel, Gucci, and Rick Owens.

Lambert is developing his debut fiction feature, building on themes from his recent co-directed docudrama for Netflix, Eldorado, which explores the erased LGBTQ+ history of Berlin from 1926 to 1932.

== Film ==
In 2020 he founded the experimental queer art/film project, VITIUM, that produces film and publishing projects, live theater and curation.

=== Filmography ===
Year	Title	Format	Notes
2023	Arias For A New World	Feature Length Performance	Director / Written, Created by and Starring MJ Harper
2022	ElDorado (Netflix)	Doc-Drama Feature	Co-Director with Benjamin Cantu
2020	Pleasure Park	Short	Writer/Director
2017	Nipples	Short	Director
2017	i-D: Out of this World	Documentary	Director
2017	Flower	Short	Writer/Director
2016	His sweat	Short documentary	Director
2015	Meat	Short	Director
2013	Heile Gänsje	Short	Writer/Director
2010	We Who Are Young Are Old	Short	Writer/Director

== Theatre / Live Performance ==
He is the founder and creative-director of SISSY SMUT, an ongoing queer film and performance series at Berlin's renowned Volksbühne Theater.

He has collaborated on a series of live performance with artists Michele Lamy, MJ Harper, Brontez Purnell

== Music videos ==
Lambert's music videos have included:

Year	Title	Artist	Notes
2013	The Libertine	Patrick Wolf	Director
2014	My Offence	Hercules & Love Affair	Director
2014	Habitat	Austra	Director
2016	High School Never Ends	Mykki Blanco	Director
2016	Worship	Years & Years	Director
2017	Paracetamol	Declan McKenna	Director
2017	Butt Muscle	Christeene	Director
2018	Hunted	Lotic	Director
2018	Release Me	Evvol	Co-Director
2018	As a Man	Anna Calvi	Director
2019	Ode To A Love Lost	Finn Ronsdorf	Director
2020	Blue	Finn Ronsdorf	Director
2024	Why?	Bronski Beat	Director
2025	No Lube, So Rude	Peaches	Director

== Fashion ==
Lambert's collaborations as a filmmaker and photographer include Rick Owens, Comme Des Garçons, Gucci, Calvin Klein, Givenchy, Charles Jeffrey, Yves Saint Laurent, Stefano Pilati, Diesel, Ludovic de Saint Sernin, Palomo Spain. His has been featured inDazed, i-D, GQ, Vogue, Documental Journal, Butt, 032c

== Books & Publications ==
- 'If You Can Reach My Heart You Can Keep It' (2024) Published by Baron Books
- Pleasure Park. 2019. A collaboration between Tom of Finland Foundation and MEN.com
- Butt Muscle. 2017. A collaboration with Rick Owens
- Lambert, Matt (2015). KEIM. PogoBooks. ISBN 978-3-942547-47-5.
- Vitium. Bruno Gmünder. 2016.
- Lambert, Matt (2017). Home. Grindr Imprints. ISBN 978-0-692-80864-1.
