= React (Switch Disco and Ella Henderson song) =

2023 single by Switch Disco and Ella Henderson

Single by Switch Disco and Ella Henderson

from the EP Vacancy
- Released: 13 January 2023
- Genre: Dance-pop
- Length: 3:21 (album version); 3:06 (radio edit)
- Label: Relentless; Sony Music
- Songwriters: Maegan Cottone; Ella Henderson; Robert Miles
- Producers: Switch Disco; Robert Miles; Punctual

Switch Disco singles chronology
"Everything" (2021)	"React" (2023)	"Ease My Mind" (2023)

Ella Henderson singles chronology
"Heartstrings" (2022)	"React" (2023)	"No Sleep" (2023)

Music video
- "React" on YouTube

"React" is a song by British production duo Switch Disco and English singer-songwriter Ella Henderson, released on 13 January 2023. The song heavily samples Italian DJ Robert Miles' 1995 instrumental "Children". It was released as the lead single from Switch Disco's debut EP Vacancy. The song was nominated for "Song of the Year" at the Brit Awards 2024.

== Music video ==
The official music video for "React" was released on 23 March 2023.

An acoustic version of the song and an official video were released on 5 April 2023.

The music video shows people doing calisthenics, at street workout locations. Some of these London locations are:

- Shadwell Basin Outdoor Gym,
- Ruskin Park,
- Corner of Cornwall Street and Watney Street.

== Commercial performance ==
"React" debuted at number 90 on the Official UK Singles Top 100 chart on 10 February 2023, reaching a peak of number 4 in June 2023. The song peaked at number 3 on the UK Singles Downloads Chart and spent a total of 19 weeks on that chart. Additionally, "React" peaked at number 2 on the UK Dance Singles Chart in that country.

== Track listing ==
Digital download / streaming – various releases

1. "React" – 3:21
2. "React" (Extended Mix) – 4:09
3. "React" (TeeDee Remix) – 3:21
4. "React" (Acoustic) – 3:06
5. "React" (VIP Mix) – 4:07
6. "React" (Culture Shock Remix) – 3:27
7. "React" (Gabry Ponte Remix) – 2:29
8. "React" (Chill Mix) – 3:12
9. "React" ($werve Remix) – 3:12
10. "React" (Instrumental) – 3:21
11. "React" (Acappella) – 3:21
12. "React" (Restricted Remix) – 2:53

== Charts ==
=== Weekly charts ===
Weekly chart performance for "React"
Chart (2023–2024)	Peak position
Belarus Airplay (TopHit)	3
CIS Airplay (TopHit)	2
Czech Republic Airplay (ČNS IFPI)	1
Estonia Airplay (TopHit)	12
Hungary (Dance Top 40)	5
Hungary (Rádiós Top 40)	1
Ireland (IRMA)	4
Kazakhstan Airplay (TopHit)	10
Latvia Airplay (LAIPA)	15
Lithuania Airplay (TopHit)	6
Moldova Airplay (TopHit)	1
Poland (Polish Airplay Top 100)	9
Romania Airplay (TopHit)	96
Russia Airplay (TopHit)	2
Slovakia Airplay (ČNS IFPI)	18
Ukraine Airplay (TopHit)	28
UK Singles (Official Charts)	4
UK Dance (Official Charts)	2
US Hot Dance/Electronic Songs (Billboard)	50

=== Monthly charts ===
Monthly chart performance for "React"
Chart (2023)	Peak position
Belarus Airplay (TopHit)	3
CIS Airplay (TopHit)	3
Czech Republic (Rádio – Top 100)	5
Estonia Airplay (TopHit)	13
Kazakhstan Airplay (TopHit)	19
Latvia Airplay (TopHit)	11
Lithuania Airplay (TopHit)	8
Moldova Airplay (TopHit)	5
Russia Airplay (TopHit)	3
Slovakia (Rádio Top 100)	18
Ukraine Airplay (TopHit)	38

=== Year-end charts ===
2023 Year-end chart performance for "React"
Chart (2023)	Position
Belarus Airplay (TopHit)	13
CIS Airplay (TopHit)	13
Estonia Airplay (TopHit)	61
Hungary (Dance Top 40)	58
Hungary (Rádiós Top 40)	37
Kazakhstan Airplay (TopHit)	80
Latvia Airplay (TopHit)	8
Lithuania Airplay (TopHit)	12
Moldova Airplay (TopHit)	118
Poland (Polish Airplay Top 100)	41
Russia Airplay (TopHit)	10
UK Singles (OCC)	20

2024 Year-end chart performance for "React"
Chart (2024)	Position
Belarus Airplay (TopHit)	128
CIS Airplay (TopHit)	144
Hungary (Dance Top 40)	17
Hungary (Rádiós Top 40)	21

2025 year-end chart performance for "React"
Chart (2025)	Position
CIS Airplay (TopHit)	189
Hungary (Dance Top 40)	51

== Certifications ==
Certifications for "React"
Region	Certification	Certified units/sales
Hungary (MAHASZ)	Platinum	4,000^{‡}
New Zealand (RMNZ)	Gold	15,000^{‡}
Poland (ZPAV)	Platinum	50,000^{‡}
United Kingdom (BPI)	2× Platinum	1,200,000^{‡}
^{‡} Sales+streaming figures based on certification alone.
