= Brazil (Declan McKenna song) =

Single by Declan McKenna

from the album What Do You Think About the Car?
- B-side: "Basic"
- Released: 4 December 2015
- Recorded: 2014
- Genre: Indie rock
- Length: 4:12
- Label: Self-released
- Songwriter: Declan McKenna
- Producer: Max Marlow

Declan McKenna singles chronology
"Brazil" (2015)	"Paracetamol" (2016)

"Brazil" is the debut single by English singer-songwriter Declan McKenna. Written by McKenna and produced by Max Marlow, it was released as the lead single from McKenna's debut studio album, What Do You Think About the Car? on 4 December 2015.

After putting "Brazil" on his Bandcamp page, around 40 music managers heard it and attended his next gig to try sign him. The song was written about the 2014 FIFA World Cup, the dismal poverty in the country and the corruption surrounding Sepp Blatter and other FIFA officials.

The song went viral on TikTok in May 2022, resulting in it reaching new highest peaks in the charts in the United Kingdom and Ireland.

== Critical reception ==
BBC News called the song an extraordinarily mature song for a 16-year-old songwriter. Matt Wilkinson at NME called it "one of the best songs" of 2015, he said, "This bright’n’breezy Hertfordshire teen's first track 'Brazil' was one of the best songs of last year, recalling Jamie T right at the start of his career and being easily the finest song to ever be written about corruption in football."

== Live performances ==
On 25 May 2016, McKenna performed the song live on the late-night talk show Conan, which was shown on TBS. He performed the song live at BBC Radio 1's Big Weekend 2017 on the BBC Introducing Stage.

== Music video ==
A music video to accompany the release of "Brazil" was first released onto YouTube on 2 December 2014. The video was directed by Dan Stokes.

== Personnel ==
Credits adapted from Tidal.

- Max Marlow – drummer, bassist, producer, engineer, mixing engineer
- Declan McKenna – guitarist, composer, lyricist, vocalist
- Barry Grint – mastering engineer

== Charts ==
=== Weekly charts ===
Weekly chart performance
Chart (2015–2017)	Peak position
France (SNEP)	135
Japan (Japan Hot 100)	45
US Adult Alternative Airplay (Billboard)	12
US Alternative Airplay (Billboard)	16
US Hot Rock & Alternative Songs (Billboard)	41

2022 chart performance for "Brazil"
Chart (2022)	Peak position
Ireland (IRMA)	22
UK Singles (Official Charts)	56

Weekly chart performance for "Brazil" (Switch Disco version)
Chart (2026)	Peak position
Czech Republic Airplay (ČNS IFPI)	4
Latvia Airplay (TopHit)	10
Lithuania Airplay (TopHit)	194
Poland Airplay (TopHit)	148

=== Monthly charts ===
Monthly chart performance for "Brazil" (Switch Disco version)
Chart (2026)	Peak position
Latvia Airplay (TopHit)	20

== Certifications ==
Certifications for "Brazil"
Region	Certification	Certified units/sales
Denmark (IFPI Danmark)	Gold	45,000^{‡}
New Zealand (RMNZ)	2× Platinum	60,000^{‡}
Poland (ZPAV)	Gold	25,000^{‡}
United Kingdom (BPI)	3× Platinum	1,800,000^{‡}
United States (RIAA)	2× Platinum	2,000,000^{‡}
^{‡} Sales+streaming figures based on certification alone.

== Release history ==
Release history and formats for "Brazil"
Region	Date	Format	Label
Various	4 December 2015	Digital download	Columbia Records
