= British Bombs =

2019 single by Declan McKenna

Single by Declan McKenna
- Released: 19 August 2019
- Genre: Pop punk
- Length: 4:57
- Label: Sony Music Entertainment
- Songwriter: Declan McKenna
- Producer: James Ford

Declan McKenna singles chronology
"Listen to Your Friends" (2018)	"British Bombs" (2019)	"Brew (Regurgitated)" (2019)

"British Bombs" is a song by English singer, songwriter, and musician Declan McKenna. It was released as single on 19 August 2019 through Sony Music Entertainment. The song was written by McKenna and produced by James Ford.

== Background ==
McKenna said that "British Bombs" is about the hypocrisy of the British arms trade and DSEI, the weapons convention in London. "I think too often it's implied that matters in the world are too complex to not end up with war, or to not possess and sell weapons, and I just think it is pure bullshit," he told NME. "Not only do we still engage in wars far away from our homes, which settle nothing and fuel extremism in the aftermath, we sell weapons to other countries full well knowing where they end up. I wanted to write a song that was outright against war, in any form. Violence breeds violence and I just don't think the world is too complex to set a peaceful precedent, but it seems the business of war is what keeps happening. To say it's a shame feels like a huge understatement."

== Music video ==
A music video to accompany the release of "British Bombs" was first released onto YouTube on 19 August 2019. The music video was directed by Ed Bulmer.

== Personnel ==
Credits adapted from Tidal.

- James Ford – producer
- Declan McKenna – composer, lyricist, associated performer, piano, vocal
- Tom Herbert – assistant engineer
- Nathan Cox – bass
- Gabrielle King – drums
- Matt Jaggar – engineer
- Will Bishop – keyboards
- Kevin Tuffy – mastering engineer
- Alan Moulder – mixing engineer
- Caesar Edmunds – mixing engineer
- Ed Bulmer - Puppetmaster (designer)

== Charts ==
Chart (2019)	Peak position
Belgium (Ultratip Bubbling Under Flanders)	44

== Release history ==
Region	Date	Format	Label
Various	19 August 2019	Digital download; streaming	Sony Music Entertainment

== See also ==
- List of anti-war songs
