= Time Out Youth =

American non-profit organization that supports LGBT youth

Time Out Youth is a nonprofit organization in Charlotte, North Carolina, that advocates, supports and provides mental health and housing services for LGBTQ+ youth.

Time Out Youth was founded by Tonda Taylor in 1991 as a way to help LGBT youth who had been banished from their own homes because of their sexuality. In its first years it hosted Charlotte's first LGBT prom, and was part of the national initiatives for LGBT youth.

Today they offer community programs and free mental health counseling to 13 - 24 year olds who identify as lesbian, gay, bisexual or transgender (LGBTQ+). They also operate a housing and supportive services department for LGBTQ+ youth ages 18 - 24. This includes a shower, laundry room, emergency financial assistance, assistance securing an apartment, employment, and more. LGBTQ+ youth account for nearly 40 percent of homeless youth and are at a high risk for assault and violence, hence the need for an organization like Time Out Youth. The organization serves a seven-county region in the Charlotte metro area.
