= What Do You Think About the Car? =

Studio album by Declan McKenna
- Released: 21 July 2017
- Recorded: 2015–2017
- Genre: Indie rock
- Length: 47:35
- Label: Columbia
- Producers: Rostam Batmanglij; Neil Comber; James Ford; Max Marlow

Declan McKenna chronology
Liar (2016)	What Do You Think About the Car? (2017)	Regurgitated (2019)

Declan McKenna studio album chronology
What Do You Think About the Car? (2017)	Zeros (2020)

Singles from What Do You Think About the Car?
- 1. "Brazil" Released: 4 December 2015; 2. "Paracetamol" Released: 17 March 2016; 3. "Bethlehem" Released: 20 May 2016; 4. "Isombard" Released: 2 September 2016; 5. "The Kids Don't Wanna Come Home" Released: 11 January 2017; 6. "Humongous" Released: 9 June 2017

What Do You Think About the Car? is the debut album by English singer-songwriter and musician Declan McKenna. It was released worldwide on 21 July 2017 through Columbia Records. Singles for the record – most notably "Brazil", were released as early as 2015. Lyrically, the album sees McKenna focus on a number of political and social issues such as corruption in the FIFA World Cup and transgender suicide. The album peaked at number 11 on the UK Album Charts and number 8 in Scotland.

== Composition ==
What Do You Think About the Car? has been described as featuring indie rock throughout. In 2015, at age 15, McKenna won the Glastonbury Festival's Emerging Talent Competition, and started writing songs for the album soon after, while still in school. Writing went on for 2 years. McKenna says, "There were a lot of changes, and I think you can hear that within some of the songs on the record. Quite a big part of the album is about change and being confused". He composed most of the album in his bedroom, except "Listen To Your Friends", which was written in Los Angeles. "Brazil" was written when he was 15. McKenna says, "The album is about me being playful and positive about not necessarily happy topics ... That's what I'm like as a character. I try not to be too distant from serious topics as well. The two go together." "Paracetamol" was written after learning about the suicide of transgender teen Leelah Alcorn and the media's representation of LGBT communities in general.

== Title ==
When McKenna was four years old, his family got a new Toyota Previa. In a home video that captured the moment, McKenna's sister asks, "Dec, what do you think about the car?" to which he replies, "I think it's really good, and I'm going to sing my new album now." The album's opening song, "Humongous" has the audio clip of the exchange as its intro.

== Critical reception ==
Professional ratings
Aggregate scores
Source	Rating
AnyDecentMusic?	7.3/10
Metacritic	76/100
Review scores
Source	Rating
DIY	4/5 stars
The Guardian	4/5 stars
NME	4/5 stars

On Metacritic, which assigns a normalised rating out of 100 to reviews from mainstream critics, reported an average score of 76 based on 9 reviews, indicating "generally favorable reviews". Dork magazine writer Stephen Ackroyd calls the album, "one of the sharpest, most engaging debut albums of 2017. It's not showy – not really – but rather an extended hand into a world where anything feels possible" Dave Simpson of The Guardian calls the album a "cracking debut", noting, "They are protest songs, but sound anything but worthy or world-weary. Instead, they are sun-soaked aural fizz bombs which channel indie rock through his love of David Bowie and ABBA." Thea de Gallier of NME states McKenna, "he narrates his innermost feelings on everything from politics ('Isombard') to the media's treatment of transgender suicide ('Paracetamol') with subtlety and skill. Standout 'Make Me Your Queen' is a rare moment of intimacy as he laments the ache of unrequited love, again with a delicacy and wisdom beyond his years."

== Track listing ==
All tracks written by Declan McKenna; track 11 co-written by Rostam Batmanglij. All tracks produced by James Ford, unless otherwise noted.

No.	Title	Producer	Length
1.	"Humongous"		5:21
2.	"Brazil"	Max Marlow	4:12
3.	"The Kids Don't Wanna Come Home"		5:17
4.	"Mind"		4:20
5.	"Make Me Your Queen"		3:41
6.	"Isombard"		3:44
7.	"I Am Everyone Else"		3:56
8.	"Bethlehem"		3:46
9.	"Why Do You Feel So Down"		3:41
10.	"Paracetamol"	Neil Comber	5:18
11.	"Listen to Your Friends"	Rostam Batmanglij	4:19

Japanese edition bonus tracks
No.	Title	Length
12.	"Excitement"	3:00
13.	"Brew" (Live at The Garage)	5:16
14.	"Basic" (Live at The Garage)	3:30
Total length:		59:00

== Personnel ==
Adapted from liner notes.

Musicians

- Declan McKenna – writer
- Garrett Ray – drums
- Vanessa Freebarn-Smith – cello

Technical

- James Ford – producer (tracks 1, 3–9), mixer (track 8)
- Max Marlow – producer (track 2), mixer (track 2)
- Neil Comber – producer (track 10)
- Rostam Batmanglij – writer (track 11), producer (track 11)
- Jimmy Robertson – engineer (tracks 1, 3–9)
- Craig Silvey – mixer (tracks 1, 3–6, 7, 9–11)
- Eduardo De La Paz – mixer assistant (track 6)
- Barry Grint – mastering

== Charts ==
Chart (2017)	Peak position
Belgian Albums (Ultratop Flanders)	130
Dutch Albums (Album Top 100)	136
Irish Albums (IRMA)	26
Scottish Albums (Official Charts)	8
UK Albums (Official Charts)	11
US Heatseekers Albums (Billboard)	7

== Certifications ==
Certifications for What Do You Think About The Car
Region	Certification	Certified units/sales
New Zealand (RMNZ)	Gold	7,500^{‡}
United Kingdom (BPI)	Silver	60,000^{‡}
^{‡} Sales+streaming figures based on certification alone.
