= What Happened to the Beach? =

Studio album by Declan McKenna
- Released: 9 February 2024
- Genre: Psychedelic pop; pop rock
- Length: 39:35
- Label: Tomplicated
- Producer: Gianluca Buccellati

Declan McKenna chronology
Zeros (2020)	What Happened to the Beach? (2024)

Singles from What Happened to the Beach?
- 1. "Sympathy" Released: 6 July 2023; 2. "Nothing Works" Released: 13 September 2023; 3. "Elevator Hum" Released: 30 November 2023; 4. "Mulholland's Dinner and Wine" Released: 18 January 2024

What Happened to the Beach? is the third studio album by English singer-songwriter Declan McKenna. It was released on 9 February 2024 under his own label, Tomplicated. Produced by Gianluca Buccellati and inspired by McKenna's experiences in California, the album's style and sound marks a significant departure from his previous record, Zeros (2020). Four singles preceded What Happened to the Beach?, including "Sympathy" and "Nothing Works".

== Background and release ==
In September 2020, Declan McKenna released his second studio album, Zeros, to widespread positive reception. It peaked at No. 2 on the UK Albums Chart. Following a tour of North America from May 2023, he released the lead single "Sympathy" on 6 July 2023 alongside a music video. He said the track was a "stark introduction to the new world [he had] created," and promised a strong sonic departure from his previous work. A second single, "Nothing Works", was released on 13 September when McKenna announced the title and release date of What Happened to the Beach?. Two more singles were later released: "Elevator Hum" in December 2023, and "Mulholland's Dinner and Wine" in January 2024. McKenna played several album launch concerts through the UK and Ireland following the album's release on 9 February 2024.

== Composition ==
Produced by Gianluca Beccellati, What Happened to the Beach? is described as a "guitar-pop heavy record", and marks a stylistic departure from his previous album, Zeros. In a press release, McKenna cited Unknown Mortal Orchestra and St. Vincent as his biggest inspirations going into recording. Reflecting on Zeros, the singer said he wanted to distance himself from its soapboxing in the new album: "I was putting a lot of pressure on myself in the past when I just needed to drop the intensity a bit and have some fun," he said.

== Critical reception ==
Professional ratings
Aggregate scores
Source	Rating
Metacritic	82/100
Review scores
Source	Rating
The Arts Desk	3/5 stars
Clash	8/10
DIY	4/5 stars
The Guardian	4/5 stars
The Line of Best Fit	9/10
NME	4/5 stars

What Happened to the Beach? received a score of 82 out of 100 on review aggregator Metacritic based on eight critics' reviews, indicating "universal acclaim". Reviewing for British arts magazine The Arts Desk, Thomas Green said What Happened to the Beach? was a "sunny and stoned-sounding affair," and a "cheerfully offbeat adventure in the possibilities of studio recording." He said its sound recalled the music of George Harrison and Django Django. Daisy Carter of DIY called the album was "undoubtedly his most eclectic offering to date," and "an exercise in refined ideas and original execution." Reviewing for The Guardian, Ben Beaumont-Thomas said "few recent major-label albums have sounded this authentically psychedelic," and praised its inventiveness. Writing for The Line of Best Fit, Finlay Holden praised the album's sonic identity, relatability and creativity, saying the record was "a completely unexpected turn in sonic and lyrical form from an artist we thought we knew pretty well already, but it's also 100% genuine Declan McKenna".

== Track listing ==
This track listing is for physical editions of the album. Tracks 1, 8, 10, and 16 are not included on digital editions.

What Happened to the Beach? track listing
No.	Title	Writer(s)	Producer(s)	Length
1.	"Mystery Planet Pt. 1"			1:18
2.	"Wobble"	Declan McKenna; Neil Comber	Comber; Gianluca Buccellati	2:43
3.	"Elevator Hum"	McKenna; Buccellati	Buccellati	3:55
4.	"I Write the News"	McKenna; William John Titus Bishop	McKenna; Buccellati	2:45
5.	"Sympathy"	McKenna; Buccellati	Buccellati	3:05
6.	"Mulholland's Dinner and Wine"	McKenna; Buccellati	Buccellati	3:21
7.	"Breath of Light"	McKenna; Jake Passmore	McKenna; Buccellati	3:40
8.	"Mystery Planet Pt. 2"			0:44
9.	"Nothing Works"	McKenna; Buccellati	McKenna; Buccellati	4:12
10.	"It Takes 4"			0:21
11.	"The Phantom Buzz (Kick In)"	McKenna	McKenna; Buccellati	2:35
12.	"Honest Test"	McKenna	McKenna; Buccellati	3:12
13.	"Mezzanine"	McKenna; Bishop; Allie Buckley; Brad Simpson	McKenna; Buccellati	4:19
14.	"It's an Act"	McKenna	McKenna; Buccellati	5:00
15.	"4 More Years"	McKenna	McKenna; Jules Apollinaire	0:48
16.	"Mystery Planet Pt. 3"			1:41
Total length:				43:00

Japanese edition bonus tracks
No.	Title	Length
17.	"The Group"	2:14
Total length:		45:14

== Personnel ==
Musicians

- Declan McKenna – vocals (tracks 1–9, 11–16), synths (tracks 1, 4–7, 9, 11, 13, 14 and 16), bass (tracks 1, 4, 5, 9, 12–14 and 16), guitar (tracks 2, 4–9, 11, 12, 14 and 15), Mellotron (tracks 2–4, 6, 11–14), autoharp (tracks 3 and 5), penny whistle (tracks 3 and 6), drum programming (tracks 4 and 12), lap steel (track 5), percussion (tracks 5, 9, 11–14), balafon (track 7), cajón (track 7), additional drums (tracks 9 and 14), Farfisa (track 12), xylophone (track 12), organ (track 13)
- Gianluca Buccellati – drums (tracks 1, 3, 5, 9, 14 and 16), backing vocals (tracks 1, 15 and 16), bass (tracks 3, 5, 6 and 12), synths (tracks 3–7, 11–14), drum programming (tracks 3, 6 and 12), lap steel (tracks 5 and 6), percussion (tracks 5, 6, 13 and 14), Mellotron (tracks 11, 12 and 14), piano (track 12), trumpet (tracks 13 and 14)
- Eli Smart – guitar (tracks 1, 12 and 16), backing vocals (tracks 1, 4 and 16), bass (tracks 2 and 6), lap steel (tracks 3 and 5)
- Kala Swift – spoken word (track 1)
- Neil Comber – drum programming (track 2)
- Jason Boesel – additional percussion (tracks 2, 6 and 12)
- Allie Kelly – backing vocals (tracks 3, 4 and 13)
- Laura Jennings – backing vocals (tracks 3, 5 and 9), percussion (tracks 5 and 9)
- Jules Apollinaire – drum programming (track 3), percussion (track 5), backing vocals (track 15)
- William Bishop – additional drum programming (tracks 4 and 12)
- Allie Buckley – backing vocals (track 4)
- Mark C Brown – baritone saxophone (track 5)
- Henry Pearce – flute (track 5), percussion (tracks 5 and 9), backing vocals (tracks 5 and 9)
- Jack Banjo Courtney – trumpet (track 5)
- Clari Freeman Taylor – cello (track 5)
- Ben Quinn – backing vocals (tracks 5 and 9), percussion (tracks 5 and 9)
- Josh McClorey – backing vocals (tracks 5 and 9), percussion (tracks 5 and 9), lap steel (track 7)
- Connor Price – backing vocals (tracks 5 and 9), percussion (tracks 5 and 9)
- Jake Passmore – guitar (tracks 7 and 9), percussion (track 7), synths (track 7), backing vocals (tracks 7 and 9)
- Lukas Kuprecht – drums (tracks 7 and 12)
- Simon Oscroft – vocals (track 10), guitar (track 10)
- Chris Berry – drums (tracks 11 and 13)

== Charts ==
Chart performance for What Happened to the Beach?
Chart (2024)	Peak position
Irish Albums (OCC)	6
Scottish Albums (OCC)	1
UK Albums (OCC)	3
US Heatseekers Albums (Billboard)	23
