= Paracetamol (song) =

2015 single by Declan McKenna

Single by Declan McKenna

from the album What Do You Think About the Car?
- B-side: "Brew"
- Released: 4 December 2015
- Genre: Indie rock
- Length: 5:18
- Label: High Quality Popular Music
- Songwriter: Declan McKenna
- Producer: Neil Comber

Declan McKenna singles chronology
"Brazil" (2015)	"Paracetamol" (2015)	"Bethlehem" (2016)

"Paracetamol" is a song by English singer-songwriter Declan McKenna. It was first shared online in November 2015, released as a single on 4 December 2015, and later included on McKenna's debut studio album, What Do You Think About the Car?. The song addresses media representation of LGBT communities, particularly transgender youth, and was prompted by McKenna reading about the death of Leelah Alcorn.

== Background and writing ==
"Paracetamol" was among McKenna's early socially conscious songs, following his breakthrough with "Brazil". The song was prompted by McKenna reading about Leelah Alcorn, a transgender girl from Ohio who died by suicide in December 2014. Speaking to The Line of Best Fit, McKenna said he had been unaware that transgender conversion therapy was still taking place and that he had been struck by Alcorn's story. McKenna wrote the song between the ages of 15 and 16, having worked on structural and melodic ideas for some time before completing most of the lyrics in a single day. Produced by Neil Comber, it runs for 5:18.

McKenna said the song is not specifically about Alcorn's case but about the way sections of the media represent LGBT communities more generally, particularly transgender teenagers. He described the title as a metaphor, comparing the notion that a person can be "cured" of who they are through conversion therapy to an everyday painkiller. Rather than writing from the victim's perspective, which he felt would not have been right, he adopted the viewpoint of an "ambiguous authoritative figure", using disconnected, oppressive, tabloid-like language.

== Release ==
"Paracetamol" was first shared online in November 2015 and released as a two-track single through High Quality Popular Music on 4 December 2015, running to about nine minutes in total. The song subsequently appeared on the Liar EP and was later included as the tenth track on McKenna's debut studio album What Do You Think About the Car? (2017).

== Music video ==
The official music video was released in March 2016 and directed by Matt Lambert. The video follows two best friends on the LGBT spectrum – a trans boy and a gay young man – and adopts a documentary-like style that incorporates handheld, vlog-style footage filmed by the cast. Its teenage cast was recruited from Hackney, and filming took place between London and Brighton. Drag artist David Hoyle makes a cameo appearance. McKenna said that the video aimed to provide a more positive narrative for young transgender people.

External videos
- Official video on YouTube

Selected credits:

- Matt Lambert – director
- Hannah Bellil – producer
- Juliette Larthe – executive producer
- Gabi Norland – director of photography
- Sally Cooper – editor

== Critical reception ==
Writing for NME in November 2015, Matt Wilkinson praised the track as evidence of McKenna's creativity, contrasting it with the more straightforwardly melodic "Brazil"; he noted that, at around six minutes, it was not aimed at radio playlists. DIY wrote that the song did not shy away from difficult subjects, describing the 16-year-old as channelling the pains of growing up and likening its bouncing Casio synth lines to "Tom Vek jumped up on teenage hormones". Robin Murray of Clash called the accompanying video "stark, natural, and at times incredibly moving", while BBC News described McKenna as "a fresh and intelligent voice in indie-pop".

In a review of What Do You Think About the Car?, Marc Hogan of Pitchfork counted the song among the album's socially significant material, while arguing that the album did not always make such themes evident without further research. Dave Simpson of The Guardian characterised McKenna's album-era material as "sun-soaked protest songs", linking the track to media portrayals of LGBT communities. Teen Vogue presented the song as part of McKenna's politically and socially engaged songwriting.

== Credits and personnel ==
- Declan McKenna – vocals, songwriting
- Neil Comber – producer, programming, guitar, bass

== Charts ==
"Paracetamol" did not enter the main UK Singles Chart, but it charted on two UK specialist singles charts. It reached number 19 on the UK Official Physical Singles Chart and number 11 on the UK Official Vinyl Singles Chart; on each chart it first appeared on 18 February 2016 and spent one week.

Weekly chart performance for "Paracetamol"
Chart (2016)	Peak position
UK Physical Singles (OCC)	19
UK Vinyl Singles (OCC)	11

== Release history ==
Release history for "Paracetamol"
Date	Label	Catalogue	Ref.
4 December 2015	High Quality Popular Music	GB0201500069	
