= Declan McKenna =

English singer-songwriter (born 1998)

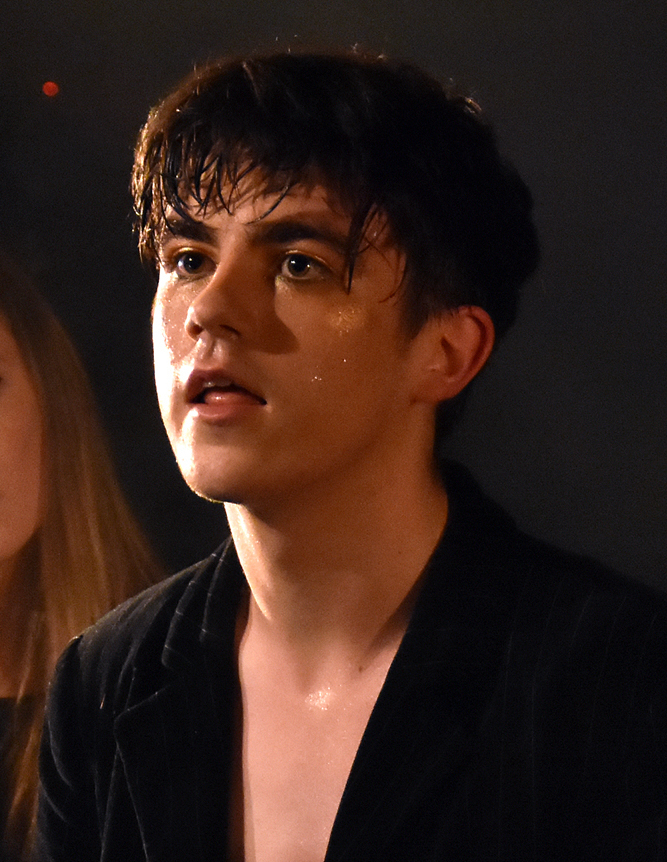
- McKenna in 2017

Background information
- Born: Declan Benedict McKenna; 24 December 1998 (age 27); Enfield, London, England
- Origin: Cheshunt, Hertfordshire, England
- Education: St Mary's Church of England High School
- Genres: Glam rock; indie rock; indie pop; dream pop; neo-psychedelia; alt-rock
- Occupations: Singer; songwriter; musician
- Instruments: Vocals; guitar; keyboards; bass guitar; banjo; drums
- Years active: 2014–present
- Labels: Columbia; High Quality Popular Music; Miniature Ponies
- Website: www.declanmckenna.net

Declan Benedict McKenna (born 24 December 1998) is an English singer-songwriter. He initially gained recognition for winning the Glastonbury Festival's Emerging Talent Competition in 2015. McKenna self-released the song "Brazil", a protest song criticising FIFA and the 2014 FIFA World Cup held in Brazil, as his debut single in December 2015. The song reached number one on Sirius XM Radio's Alt Nation Alt 18 Countdown for 23 January 2016 and held that spot for three weeks. The song also reached number 16 on the U.S. Billboard Alternative Songs chart. He released his debut studio album, What Do You Think About the Car?, in 2017. McKenna released his second studio album, Zeros, in September 2020, after multiple delays due to the COVID-19 pandemic. He released his third album, What Happened to the Beach?, in February 2024.

== Early life ==
Declan McKenna was born in Enfield, Greater London, on 24 December 1998 and grew up in Cheshunt, Hertfordshire, where he attended St Mary's Church of England High School. His mother was a teacher while his father worked as a milkman and in local politics. He is primarily of English and Irish descent and, though he no longer considers himself to be religious, he was raised Catholic. He began taking his GCSE exams in the summer of 2015. He later studied for his A-levels in English Literature, Philosophy and Ethics, and Sociology, but stopped after a few months after his music career began to consume too much of his time.

== Career ==
=== 2015: Breakthrough with "Brazil" ===
In 2015, McKenna entered the Glastonbury Festival's Emerging Talent Competition. The festival named him the winner of the contest (April 2015), for which he was awarded a £5,000 prize and a slot on the festival's William's Green Stage. NME called him "one of the most sought-after new acts" in the United Kingdom after his win, shortly after McKenna signed a management contract with Q Prime (the management company that represents British indie rock band Foals, among others). More than 40 record companies vied to sign him, with McKenna choosing Columbia Records.

McKenna wrote an extensive number of demo songs prior to releasing his first break-out single. He described the music as "Not very good!" and told an interviewer that he was trying to imitate Sufjan Stevens using basic music software. He posted roughly two albums' worth of material on his web site, but took them down after August 2015.

In August 2015, McKenna self-released his first single, "Brazil". It was originally released through his own YouTube channel on 2 December 2014. The song criticised FIFA, the governing body of association football, for selecting the 2014 FIFA World Cup host to be Brazil without addressing the extensive and deep poverty affecting the people of the nation. McKenna later told DIY that he wrote the song because "it's politics and what I see in the news, and it's just general things I feel strongly about, things happening in my life." "Brazil" garnered McKenna widespread attention, as many sports commentators found the song to be a commentary on the emerging FIFA corruption scandal. Later in the year, he was interviewed on Sky News to discuss his views on football's relationship with poverty. "Brazil" reached number one on the Alt 18 Countdown for 23 January 2016 on the Alt Nation alternative rock radio station on Sirius XM Radio, and repeated as number one a week later, on 30 January.

=== 2015–2018: Early EPs and What Do You Think About the Car? ===
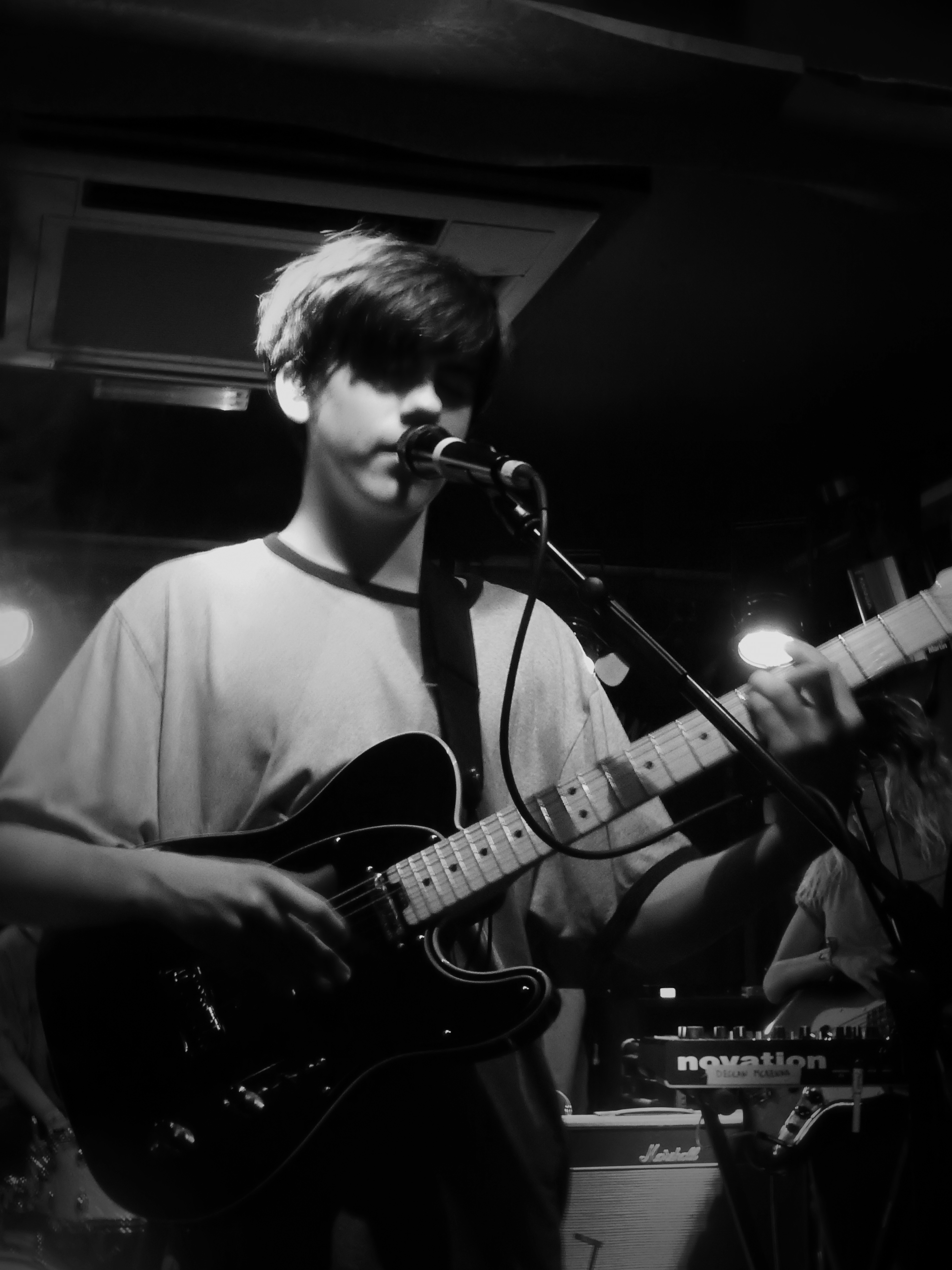
McKenna in 2016, performing at the Boileroom in Guildford

McKenna spent the remaining months of 2015 playing a wide range of British and Irish music festivals and concerts in venues throughout London. He played the Somersault Festival in North Devon, England, in July; the Boston Big Gig festival in Boston, Lincolnshire, in July; the Electric Picnic music festival in Stradbally, County Laois, Ireland, in September, and the Mirrors music festival in London in October.

In November 2015, following the success of "Brazil" and his shows in London, McKenna self-released his second single, "Paracetamol". The five-and-a-half-minute song discussed how transgender teenagers are misrepresented in the media, in response to the death of Leelah Alcorn. In an interview with Sound of Boston, McKenna explained that the title of the song came from "the idea of using the lyric paracetamol was a way of comparing the belief that someone can be cured from who they are, via therapy, to an everyday painkiller." Matt Wilkinson of NME called "Paracetamol" McKenna's second break-out hit. Although it was not likely to receive radio airplay or top out the charts, Wilkinson argued, the song showed that McKenna was not just another "UK indie troubadour, a little bit oikish and with a nifty talent for mainstream melody", but rather a solid and accomplished songwriter who can deliver "bruised and vulnerable" vocals. Jon Lyons of the music Web site ThisNewBand.com said the song showed a maturity that clearly indicated McKenna was not "just a teen dream or a one hit wonder." Billboard said in early 2016 that McKenna was "making inroads in America" with "Brazil", which charted on Billboard's Alternative Songs chart (for the week ending 27 February 2016) at number 32, rising to number 26 on 5 March 2016 chart.

McKenna stayed quiet for much of 2016, writing songs in his bedroom for his debut album, but released "Bethlehem" that year, and in late August, his fourth single, "Isombard", which treated right-wing media. He played at several music festivals in England: the NME Awards in February 2016; the Live at Leeds festival over the 2016 May Day bank holiday; The Great Escape Festival in Brighton and Hove, East Sussex, in May 2016; the Standon Calling festival in late July 2016 in Standon, Hertfordshire; and the Field Day music festival in London in June 2016. He made his North American debut at Jannus Live in St. Petersburg, Florida, on 11 March 2016. He then played three sets at South by Southwest Music on 15 March 2016. In October 2016, he was confirmed to play at the 31st edition of Eurosonic Noorderslag in Groningen, Netherlands.

McKenna appeared on BBC Music's "Sound of 2017" list at the end of 2016, after releasing the two EPs Stains and Liar that year. The EPs had similar tracklists, with "Brazil" and "Paracetamol" appearing on both. McKenna would release two more singles, "The Kids Don't Wanna Come Home" and "Humongous", before releasing his debut album, titled What Do You Think About the Car? English musician, record producer and composer James Ford, who had produced albums by Arctic Monkeys, Depeche Mode, and Florence and the Machine, produced the album, which was recorded at a Kensal Green recording studio. The album was released on 21 July 2017 and received generally positive reviews. It featured all six of McKenna's previously released singles, as well as five new tracks. All songs on the album were written by McKenna alone, with the exception of "Listen to Your Friends", which was co-written with Rostam Batmanglij. McKenna played at various festivals in 2017, including Coachella, Lollapalooza, Glastonbury Festival and Reading and Leeds Festival.

In 2017, McKenna won the BBC Music Award for BBC Introducing Artist of the Year. He also appeared at the Pilton Party 2017 with Bastille. On 17 January 2018, McKenna released a music video for "Make Me Your Queen".

=== 2019–2024: COVID-19, Zeros and What Happened to the Beach? ===
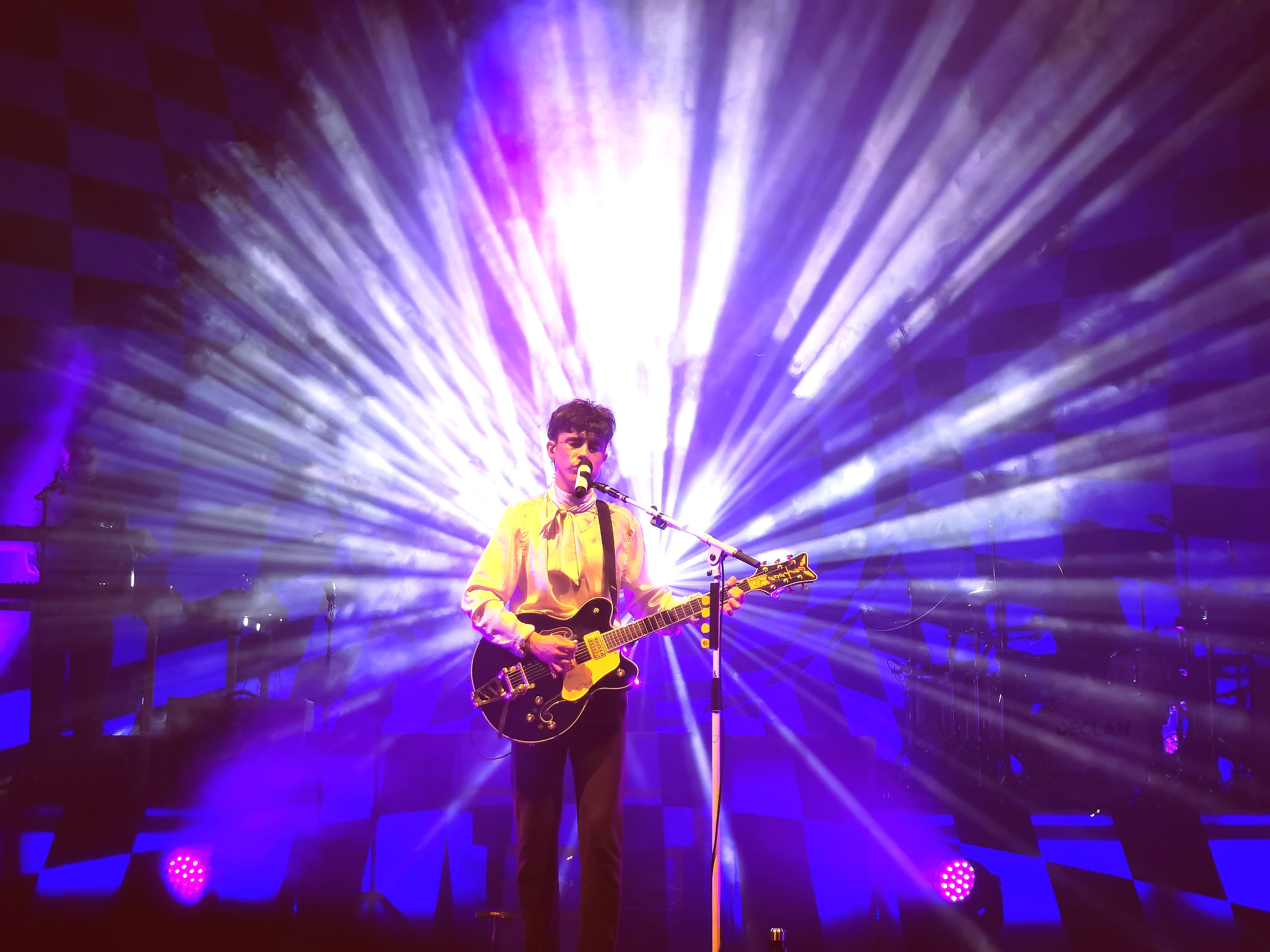
McKenna in 2021, performing at Brixton Academy in London

On 19 August 2019, McKenna released the song "British Bombs", which criticises UK foreign policy. He stated that it is specifically about "the hypocrisy of the British arms trade and the weapons convention in London". He wrote it as a result of wanting to write a song directly addressing war. McKenna later announced via Twitter on 18 December that his upcoming second studio album was mastered and ready for release. He also had an artwork shoot for the album on the same day. On 29 January 2020, McKenna revealed that his second album would be titled Zeros and be released on 15 May 2020. He also released the song "Beautiful Faces" as the album's lead single. However, due to the COVID-19 pandemic, he postponed the album until 21 August 2020. On 5 August, he announced that the album was again delayed until 4 September, when it was finally released. Nearly two years after the release, McKenna embarked on a North American tour for the album in fall of 2022.

In July 2021, he released the single "My House" with an accompanying music video, a song he described as being about "remembering what it is to be lost in your thoughts in a good way".

In May 2023, McKenna embarked on The Big Return Tour in North America. In July 2023, he released "Sympathy" as the lead single from his third studio album What Happened to the Beach?, which would be released on 9 February 2024.

In August 2024, the single "Late to the Party" was released by Orla Gartland, with McKenna as featured artist.

=== 2024–present: New Independent Chapter ===
Following the release of What Happened to the Beach?, McKenna's label deal with Columbia came to an end and in October 2024 he began Miniature Ponies, his own independent label. He marked the beginning of this new chapter in his career with the release of "Champagne" and "That's Life", a double A-side single and his first music released independently, saying that "I’ve always spearheaded what I’m doing and who I’ve worked with creatively, but there’s a different layer to it now where I don’t have someone looking over my shoulder".

The launch of this new independent chapter for McKenna coincided with the North American leg of his What Happened to the Beach? tour. In November 2024, McKenna performed in arenas for the first time in his career as he served as main support during a portion of Sabrina Carpenter's Short n' Sweet tour, saying that “Most of the music I love isn’t super clear about the lyric meanings and intentions. Sabrina has a bit of that. She can hammer home a concept, but also have fun.” Beginning in May 2025, McKenna toured as the opener on the Imagine Dragons' 28-show European stadium tour.

In January 2026, the single "Fuck It Up" was released by Master Peace, with McKenna as a featured artist, with Master Peace saying of the collaboration “Declan came in and added his own take on what the song meant to him, and it turned into something I’m really proud of. It felt like me tearing off that ‘perfect musician’ skin and showing a kind of vulnerability I’ve never really expressed in my music before.”

== Critical response ==
McKenna writes his own songs, but is supported by a band on tour currently consisting of Isabel Torres (guitar), Henry Pearce (keyboards), Linus Fenton (bass) and Ben Limmer (drums), although he has previously played all of his own instruments. In terms of the development of his musical style, he has said he would most like to emulate David Bowie's career.

BBC News called "Brazil" an extraordinarily mature song for a 16-year-old songwriter. Matt Wilkinson at NME called it "one of the best songs" of 2015, and had high praise for McKenna's second single, "Paracetamol", as well. Jon Lyons of ThisNewBand.com called "Brazil" "a catchy song no doubt", and also noted that it was "a sharp critique on sports, money and power."

Some music critics have tempered their praise of McKenna. Matt Wilkinson called McKenna's London gigs surprisingly good, if "rough around the edges". Jon Lyons has observed that as of November 2015, McKenna's songs seemed to indicate an artist still experimenting with bands and styles of music which have influenced him. He felt McKenna was still "searching for his own sound right in front of the crowd. An artist is being born note by note." Andy Welch, music critic for the Bristol Post, said McKenna was "one to watch", displaying "lots of early, ragged promise".

Andre Paine of the Evening Standard was less impressed with McKenna's live show, commenting that although his performance "had plenty of energy ... [he] didn't quite live up to his reputation as the voice of a generation", going on to call McKenna's performance "messy".

== Personal life ==
McKenna currently lives in Brighton. He says he feels very good about being a role model. At first, he said he also struggled to understand both the criticism and praise he received, but has been able to be more mature and more analytical about both. He is a vegan and supports Tottenham Hotspur F.C.

=== Sexual orientation ===
After adopting a somewhat glam rock visual style for his live performances (which included use of eye makeup and glitter), McKenna addressed questions about his sexuality with Attitude magazine by declining to label himself, saying, "I'm young. I'm here to be experimented with" and that he was "learning about a lot of things". In a second interview with Attitude in May 2020, McKenna said of his sexuality he "couldn't put a label on it" but that pansexual may come close, stating "I would never have really said my sexuality is restricted to any gender or anything ... I might call it pansexual, depending on who I'm talking to. I struggle to imagine it in any other way." He has had a girlfriend since 2017, who is the topic of his 2021 single "My House".

=== Political views ===
McKenna acknowledges that he is seen as a "political" or "protest" singer. He does not see himself as someone "leading the conversation" but rather as a person singing about things his peers are already talking about. For much of his initial work, McKenna said he tried to find inspiration for lyrics and topics in his private life. He felt his own life to be so uneventful, however, that he turned to political and social issues which he felt needed to be discussed. For his second album, however, McKenna feels that he has had so much happen that he can draw on more personal experiences for his lyrics.

McKenna performed at Labour Live, a music festival organised by the Labour Party, in June 2018. He voted for the Labour Party in the 2019 general election.

In July 2020, he signed an open letter to the then-UK Equalities minister Liz Truss calling for a ban on all forms of LGBT+ conversion therapy.

== Discography ==
Studio albums

- What Do You Think About the Car? (2017)
- Zeros (2020)
- What Happened to the Beach? (2024)
