= Luke Roskell =

British actor

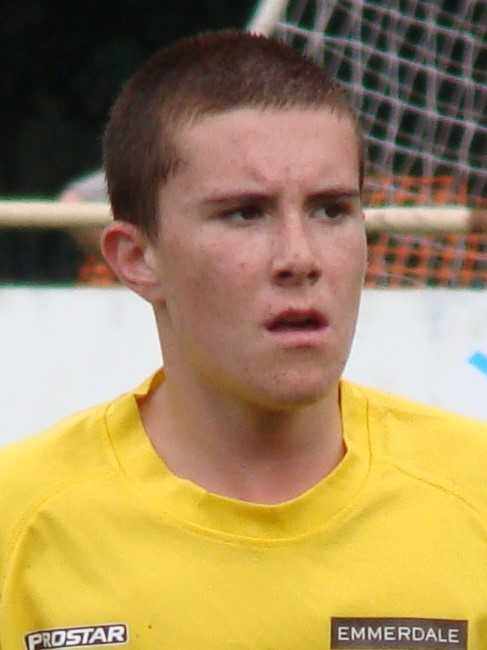
- Roskell in 2012
- Born: 4 February 1997 (age 28); Knowsley, Merseyside, England
- Occupation: Actor
- Years active: 2007–present

Luke Roskell (born 4 February 1997) is an English actor. He is known for playing Sean Spencer in the soap opera Emmerdale (2011–2014), and for his role as Pepper Sharrow in the 2017 historical drama Jamestown.

== Personal life ==
Born in Knowsley, Merseyside in 1997 and raised in nearby Grappenhall in Warrington, Cheshire. He studied at Broomfields Junior School and Bridgewater High School. Luke is the second of four children, as his mother, Andrea, has three other children, including one older brother and two younger twin siblings.

== Career ==
Roskell had his first acting role in the ITV miniseries Mobile in 2007; the following year, he was part of the main cast of TV series The Revenge Files of Alistair Fury, broadcast by BBC One and the CBBC Channel; he played the role of Aaron Pryce, a friend of main character Alistair Fury (played by Jonathan Mason). In 2010, Roskell branched out into theatre following a successful audition for the musical Her Benny, adapted from the eponymous Victorian novel (1879) about Liverpool street children by Silas Hocking. Roskell played Perks, one of the street children, over the show's October run at the Theatre Royal in St Helens.

From 2011 to 2014, Roskell portrayed Sean Spencer in the long-running soap opera Emmerdale, appearing in a total of 264 episodes. After leaving the show, he returned to the stage in 2015 to take on the role of Carl Jackson, the lead in Gareth Farr's play Britannia Waves The Rules, touring with the Royal Exchange Theatre through several locations in North West England.

In 2016, he portrayed Dan in the autism TV drama The A Word in three episodes of its first series. He was later cast in the historical drama Jamestown as Pepper Sharrow, the youngest of three brothers living as first settlers of the Colony of Jamestown in the early 17th century.

== Filmography ==
Television roles
Year	Title	Role	Notes
2007	Mobile	Tatton Heights Boy	Episode: "The Soldier"
2008	The Revenge Files of Alistair Fury	Aaron Pryce	Main role; 13 episodes
2009	Moving On	Ryan	Episode: "Bully" (Series 1)
2010	Accidental Farmer	Ellis	TV film
2011–2014	Emmerdale	Sean Spencer	Main role; 264 episodes
2016	The A Word	Dan	3 episodes (Series 1)
2017	Jamestown	Pepper Sharrow	Main role; 8 episodes
2020	Outlander	Lee Withers	Recurring

== Theatrical performances ==
Year	Title	Role	Notes
2010	Her Benny	Perks	Musical play directed by Ann Dalton, adapted from the novel by Silas Hocking; ran from 18 October to 23 October at the Theatre Royal, St Helens
2015	Britannia Waves The Rules	Carl Jackson	Lead role; play by Gareth Farr, winner of the Judges' Award of the 2011 Bruntwood Prize for Playwriting; Autumn 2015 Tour
