= Be an Astronaut =

Single by Declan McKenna

from the album Zeros
- Released: 5 August 2020
- Genre: Glam rock; pop rock
- Length: 4:35
- Label: Columbia
- Songwriter(s): Declan McKenna
- Producer(s): Jay Joyce

Declan McKenna singles chronology
"Daniel, You're Still a Child" (2020)	"Be an Astronaut" (2020)	"Rapture" (2020)

"Be an Astronaut" is a song by English singer, songwriter, and musician Declan McKenna. It was released on 5 August 2020 as the fourth single from his second studio album, Zeros. The song was written by Declan McKenna and produced by Jay Joyce.

== Background ==
McKenna announced the release of the new single on his social media on 4 August 2020. The song was released on 5 August 2020, and the song premiered on Beats 1 with Zane Lowe on the same day.

== Critical reception ==
Robin Murray from Clash said, "There's a hint of Bowie here, with Declan pushing his art in a different direction. A lush return from the boy wonder, 'Be An Astronaut' is the sound of this 21 year old setting his sights on the stars."

== Music video ==
A music video to accompany the release of "Be an Astronaut" was first released onto YouTube on 7 August 2020. The video was directed by Huse Monfaradi.

== Track listing ==
Digital download and stream
No.	Title	Length
1.	"Be an Astronaut"	4:35
2.	"Daniel, You're Still a Child"	3:58
3.	"The Key to Life on Earth"	4:06
4.	"Beautiful Faces"	3:16

== Personnel ==
Credits adapted from Tidal.

- Jay Joyce – producer
- Declan McKenna – composer, lyricist, associated performer, guitar, piano, synthesizer, vocal
- Court Blankenship – assistant engineer
- Jimmy Mansfield – assistant engineer
- Nathan Cox – bass
- Soren Bryce – cello, violin
- Gabrielle King – drums
- Jason Hall – engineer
- Matt Wolach – engineer
- Michael Freeman – engineer
- Isabel Torres – guitar
- Matt Colton – mastering engineer
- Mark 'Spike' Stent – mixing engineer

== Charts ==
Chart performance for "Be an Astronaut"
Chart (2020)	Peak position
US Adult Alternative Songs (Billboard)	24

== Release history ==
Release history and formats for "Be an Astronaut"
Region	Date	Format	Label
Various	5 August 2020	Digital download; streaming	Columbia Records
