= Hannah Steele =

British actress

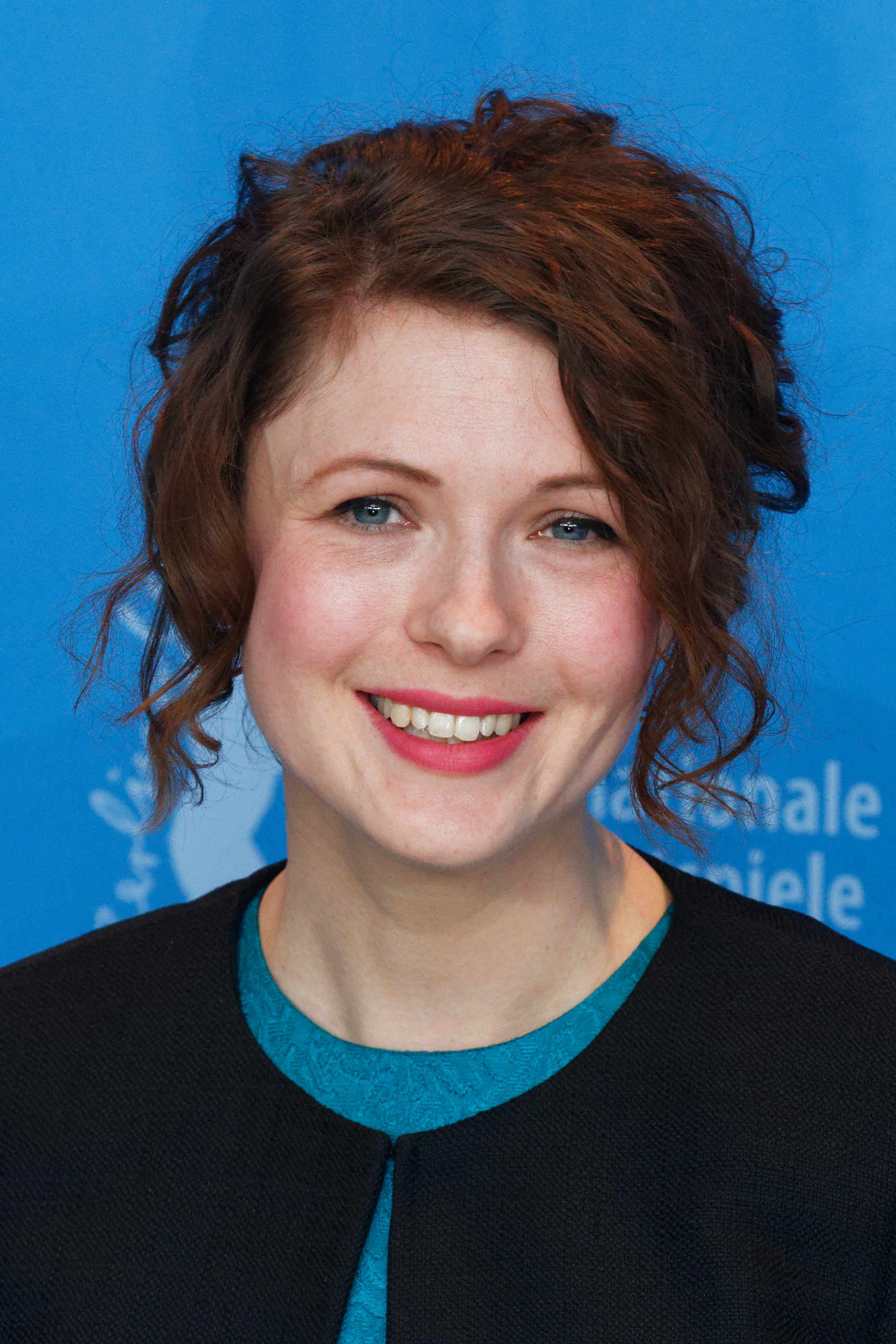
- Hannah Steele at the Berlinale 2017
- Occupation: Actress

Hannah Steele is an actress notable for her roles in Star City (2026), The Mirror and the Light (2025), Wolf Hall (2015), The Night Manager (2016), Black Mirror episode: "Shut Up and Dance" (2016), Darkest Hour (2017). She is also the voice of Emma Jaunt in Dead Island 2 (2023)

== Career ==
In 2015, Steele played a supporting role as Mary Shelton in the BBC Two series Wolf Hall, alongside Mark Rylance, Damian Lewis, Claire Foy, and Bernard Hill. The series won the Golden Globe Award for Best Miniseries in 2016. She reprised her role in 2024 in The Mirror and The Light.

In 2016, she starred in a supporting role as Marilyn in The Night Manager, with a cast that included Tom Hiddleston, Hugh Laurie, and Olivia Colman. The same year, she starred alongside Alex Lawther and Jerome Flynn in "Shut Up and Dance", an episode of the anthology series Black Mirror.

In 2021, she starred in the Sky Cinema Romantic comedy A Christmas Number One, working with Iwan Rheon. In 2023, she starred as Emma Jaunt in Dead Island 2.

== Filmography ==
=== Film ===
Year	Title	Role	Notes
2017	The Young Karl Marx	Mary Burns	
2017	Darkest Hour	Abigail Walker	
2021	A Christmas Number One	Carrie	

=== Television ===
Year	Title	Role	Notes
2010	Doctors	Elise Stone	6 episodes
2010	Doctor Who	Vampire girl	1 episode "Vampires of Venice"
2011	Eric and Ernie	Doreen	TV movie
2012	Casualty	Rebecca Bayliss	1 episode
2013	The Other Child	Young Fiona	3 hour series
2015	Wolf Hall	Mary Shelton	6 episodes
2016	The Night Manager	Marilyn	1 episode
2016	Black Mirror	Melissa	Episode: "Shut Up and Dance"
2017	Love, Lies and Records	Jenny	Season 1 episode 1
2019	Casualty	Rebecca Bayliss	1 episode

=== Video game ===
Year	Title	Role	Notes
2023	Dead Island 2	Emma Jaunt	Voice
