= Her Benny =

1920 British silent film by A.V. Bramble

- Directed by: A. V. Bramble
- Written by: George Dewhurst
- Based on: Her Benny by Silas K. Hocking
- Produced by: W. H. Baker
- Starring: Sydney Wood; Babs Reynolds; Charles Buckmaster
- Release date: January 1920
- Country: United Kingdom
- Language: English

Her Benny is a 1920 British silent romance film directed by A. V. Bramble and starring Sydney Wood, Babs Reynolds and Charles Buckmaster. It is adapted from the popular Victorian novel Her Benny (1879) by Silas K. Hocking. It follows a young boy from Liverpool as he grows up in a harsh environment.

== Cast ==
- Sydney Wood ... Benny, as a child
- Babs Reynolds ... Nellie Bates
- Charles Buckmaster ... Benny Bates
- Peggy Patterson ... Eva Lawrence
- C. Hargrave Mansell ... Joe Wragg
- Lottie Blackford ... Mrs. Wragg
- Robert Vallis ... Dick Bates
