= The Key to Life on Earth =

Single by Declan McKenna

from the album Zeros
- Released: 14 April 2020
- Genre: Indie rock
- Length: 4:06
- Label: Columbia Records
- Songwriters: Declan McKenna; Max Marlow
- Producer: Jay Joyce

Declan McKenna singles chronology
"Beautiful Faces" (2020)	"The Key to Life on Earth" (2020)	"Daniel, You're Still a Child" (2020)

"The Key to Life on Earth" is a song by English singer, songwriter, and musician Declan McKenna. It was released as the second single from his second studio album, Zeros, on 14 April 2020. The song was written by Declan McKenna, Max Marlow and produced by Jay Joyce.

== Background ==
Talking about the song, McKenna said, "'The Key to Life on Earth' reflects on mundanity and hostility. I suppose it's set in suburbia much like my hometown. The video sees two people, who are very similar, in conflict with each other, and I think that's the simplest analogy for the song's purpose."

== Music video ==
A music video to accompany the release of "The Key to Life on Earth" was first released onto YouTube on 15 April 2020. The music video features English actor Alex Lawther. McKenna and Lawther have been compared to each other for years. Talking about the video, McKenna said, "Alex Lawther is someone I've wanted to work with for a long time, I enjoyed watching his roles in Carnage, Black Mirror and The End of the F***ing World, and I was trying to get in contact after seeing how much people compared us online." In an interview with NME, Lawther called McKenna a 'wonderful musician' and that he often gets mistaken for him in public, "Sometimes people come up to me and say: 'I loved your concert last night you were so great'. They think I'm Declan McKenna. McKenna also gets mistaken for Lawther too."

== Track listing ==
Digital download and stream
No.	Title	Length
1.	"The Key to Life on Earth"	4:06
2.	"Beautiful Faces"	3:16

Digital download
No.	Title	Length
1.	"The Key to Life on Earth" (TSHA Remix)	5:25

== Personnel ==
Credits adapted from Tidal.

- Jay Joyce – producer
- Declan McKenna – composer, lyricist, associated performer, bass, guitar, synthesizer, vocal
- Max Marlow – composer, lyricist
- Court Blankenship – assistant engineer
- Jimmy Mansfield – assistant engineer
- Gabrielle King – background vocal, drums
- Isabel Torres – background vocal, guitar
- Nathan Cox – background vocal, bass, keyboards, synthesizer, xylophone
- Jason Hall – engineer
- Matt Wolach – engineer
- Michael Freeman – engineer
- Matt Colton – mastering engineer
- Mark 'Spike' Stent – mixing engineer

== Release history ==
Release history and formats for "The Key to Life on Earth"
Region	Date	Format	Label
Various	14 April 2020	Digital download; streaming	Columbia Records
