= Shut Up and Dance (Black Mirror) =

- Black Mirror episode
- Critics received Lawther's acting as Kenny (pictured) positively, with Caroline Framke finding Kenny to be "quivering, desperate, heartbreaking". The episode is a dark thriller.
- Episode no.: Series 3 Episode 3
- Directed by: James Watkins
- Written by: Charlie Brooker; William Bridges
- Cinematography by: Tim Maurice-Jones
- Editing by: Jon Harris
- Original release date: 21 October 2016
- Running time: 52 minutes

Guest appearances
- Alex Lawther as Kenny; Jerome Flynn as Hector; Susannah Doyle as Georgina Tarrington (Note: Credited as "Blackmailed Woman"); Hannah Steele as Melissa; Sarah Beck Mather as Restaurant Mother; Beatrice Robertson-Jones as Restaurant Daughter; Maya Gerber as Lindsay; Camilla Power as Sandra; Ivanno Jeremiah as Blackmailed Man; Natasha Little as Karen; Nicola Sloane as Bank Clerk; Paul Bazely as Man in the Woods; Leanne Best as Penny

Episode chronology
← Previous "Playtest"	Next → "San Junipero"

"Shut Up and Dance" is the third episode of the third series of the British science fiction anthology series Black Mirror. It was written by series creator and showrunner Charlie Brooker and William Bridges, and premiered on Netflix on 21 October 2016, together with the rest of series three.

The episode tells the story of a teenage boy, Kenny (Alex Lawther), who is blackmailed into committing bizarre and criminal acts by anonymous hackers in possession of a video of him masturbating. The teen is joined by a middle-aged man (Jerome Flynn), who is also being blackmailed over infidelity. The episode is dark in tone and has themes related to a previous episode, "White Bear".

"Shut Up and Dance" received mixed reviews. Critics praised Lawther and Flynn's acting, but were polarised as to whether the episode's tone was effective, whether the plot twist was good and whether the episode had interesting themes.

== Plot ==
Georgina Tarrington (Susannah Doyle), the CEO of a chain of hotels, parks a car in a parking garage. She gets a text and puts the car keys on the back tire. She gets another text message and leaves.

Kenny (Alex Lawther), a socially awkward 19-year-old busboy, returns home from work to find that his younger sister Lindsey (Maya Gerber) has unintentionally infected his laptop with malware. He accidentally downloads an anti-malware trojan, which allows unseen hackers to record him masturbating through his webcam. They contact Kenny and threaten to release the footage to his entire contact list unless he follows their orders.

At work, a text summons Kenny to a location 15 miles (24 kilometres) away in 45 minutes. Feigning illness to leave, he frantically cycles there and is met by another blackmail victim (Ivanno Jeremiah), who passes Kenny a box containing a cake. Ordered to deliver the cake to a hotel room, Kenny meets Hector (Jerome Flynn), whom the hackers have also blackmailed. He had arranged to have sex with a prostitute and fears he will lose custody of his children if his wife Penny (Leanne Best) finds out.

The two are told to drive to a set of coordinates in the car that Georgina had parked. Stopping for petrol, they meet Karen (Natasha Little), a friend of Hector's wife, who requests a lift home. Hector drives recklessly in order to get her there so that he and Kenny can then continue to their destination to meet the strict deadline. Tasked with using a gun concealed in the cake to rob a bank, Hector insists on being the driver, leaving Kenny to perform the robbery. Despite urinating in his panic, he steals a bag of cash and flees the scene with Hector.

Hector is instructed to destroy the car, while Kenny takes the money to a drop site in a forest in Wittenham Clumps. He meets another victim (Paul Bazely), who explains they are to fight to the death while being filmed through a drone, and the winner earns the money. When the second victim asks Kenny what he did to get the hackers' attention, Kenny tearfully insists that he "just looked at pictures"; the second victim replies that he did the same, and asks, "How young were they?". Kenny attempts to shoot himself, but discovers the gun is empty, and the other man attacks him.

Arriving home, Hector is texted a Trollface, learning the blackmailers have disclosed evidence of his infidelity to Penny. Georgina, revealed to be another victim of the hackers, also receives a Trollface text, and then reads a news article exposing her for sending racist emails to her employees. A bloodied, shellshocked Kenny staggers from the woods, the implication being that he beat the other man to death. His mother (Camilla Power) phones him, screaming that Lindsay and her friends received a video of him "looking at kids". As she begs Kenny to tell her it isn't true, he gets a Trollface text, and hangs up as police arrive and arrest him.

== Production ==
Whilst series one and two of Black Mirror were shown on Channel 4 in the UK, in September 2015 Netflix commissioned the series for 12 episodes (split into two series of six episodes). In March 2016, Netflix outbid Channel 4 for the rights to distributing the third series, with a bid of $40 million. Due to its move to Netflix, the show had a larger budget than in previous series. "Shut Up and Dance" is the third episode of the third series; all six episodes in this series were released on Netflix simultaneously on 21 October 2016. As Black Mirror is an anthology series, each episode is standalone.

External videos
- "Black Mirror – Season 3"; The trailer for series three of Black Mirror.

The titles of the six episodes that make up series 3 were announced in July 2016, along with the release date. A trailer for series three, featuring an amalgamation of clips and sound bites from the six episodes, was released by Netflix on 7 October 2016. Two days prior to the release of series 3 on Netflix, Den of Geek! published an interview in which Brooker hinted that the episode is "a grimy, contemporary nightmare" set in London, with no science fiction elements.

=== Conception and writing ===
The episode was co-written by series creator Charlie Brooker and William Bridges, who was new to the television industry. Bridges pitched three ideas to Brooker and executive producer Annabel Jones and although none of them were developed further, he was sent a draft script of "Shut Up and Dance" to work on. Brooker stated that the absence of science fiction elements from the episode was a "very conscious" decision, noting that science fiction is also absent from series one episode "The National Anthem" and series two episode "The Waldo Moment". Having recently written series three episode "San Junipero", which was conceived of as a 1980s period piece, Brooker was interested in writing a present-day story. He commented that the "weird, British, colloquial nasty humour" and "seediness" of the episode is similar to "The National Anthem".

The story went through many different iterations, starting from an idea similar to 1992 heist film Reservoir Dogs, where a group of strangers were tossed together to commit a robbery. Some drafts did not imply that Kenny was looking at child pornography. In one version of the story, there was no reason why the events were happening, and in another the roles were reversed, with Hector being the pedophile. In a different draft, the hackers were shown in an internet café in Eastern Europe, having blackmailed the characters for fun. The episode was originally set in the United States, as this would make it easier for the characters to access a gun, and the timeframe of the storyline was initially longer.

=== Filming ===
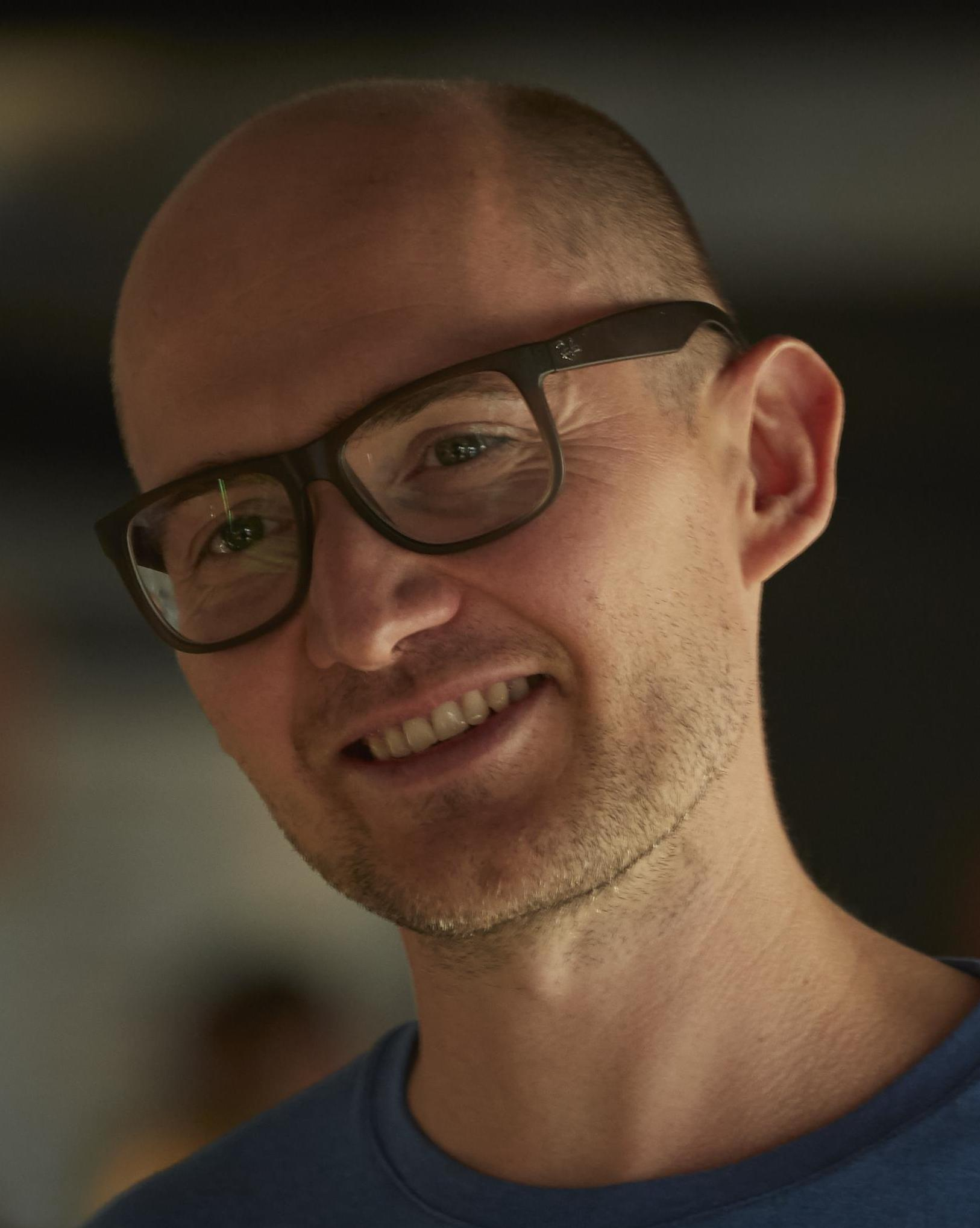
James Watkins directed the episode.

The episode was filmed over a three-week period; it was the second in the series to be filmed, after "San Junipero". Director James Watkins had previously directed horror films Eden Lake (2008) and The Woman in Black (2012), which Lawther says made Watkins "really [learn] the craft of sustaining incredible suspense over long periods of time." It was Watkins' first experience directing television. Having seen art department preparations for series three episodes "Nosedive" and "San Junipero", Watkins aimed to deviate from their tones to "embrace being the ugly cousin." Alex Lawther plays the main character Kenny; having been a fan of the programme prior to auditioning, Lawther particularly liked series two episode "White Bear". When first auditioning, Lawther had only seen the script for a couple of scenes and was unaware of the twist ending.

Lawther's first proper meeting with co-star Jerome Flynn was during shooting of in the in-car scenes. Filming was intense, with Flynn hyperventilating at times, though there was also corpsing (breaking into laughter) from Flynn, Lawther and Natasha Little, who played Hector's wife's friend Karen. Lawther played Kenny as if he were innocent, as his character is very repressed about his sexual proclivities. He also believed that Kenny feels constantly uncomfortable. Kenny handing a toy back to the girl who had left it behind in the cafe was intended as a hint to Kenny being a pedophile; there were discussions over how the scene should be acted to avoid giving away the twist. After struggling to find a parent who was happy to have their daughter act as the girl, Jones had her own daughter play the role. Lawther commented that whilst filming, he saw a news story similar to the episode's storyline, which he found surreal.

The ending features Radiohead's "Exit Music (For a Film)", initially included as a temporary track during editing. The producers received permission from Radiohead to use the song as they liked Black Mirror.

== Analysis ==
The episode was found to be the most similar to prior Black Mirror episodes out of those in the third series. Pat Stacey of the Irish Independent noted that it is the only episode of the series set entirely in England, whilst Alex Mullane of Digital Spy compared it to a "British version" of 1995 action film Die Hard with a Vengeance, as the main character "is led on a not-so-merry chase around the city." Sean Fitz-Gerald of Thrillist wrote that it is a "dark thriller" which is both "a very atypical and very classic Black Mirror story." The episode's tone was seen by Robbie Collin of The Daily Telegraph as the "most nihilistic" Black Mirror episode to that point; he commented that its "vision of humanity" is "uncompromisingly negative" and that it leaves an "acrid aftertaste".

Stuart Joy, writer of the book Through the Black Mirror: Deconstructing the Side Effects of the Digital Age, analysed that the portrayal of Kenny as youthful deceives the viewer and challenges societal perceptions of paedophiles. Lawther said of the script: "How brilliant [it was] that they'd made me sympathize with a paedophile for so long, and the complexity of that, because he's so young." His character is 19 years old, a withdrawn and socially awkward teenager who is easily intimidated by workplace bullies and infantilised by his mother. Joy noted that Kenny's attitude towards sex is indicative of immaturity. Questioned by the much older Hector about what the hackers had caught him doing, Kenny refuses to say the word "masturbation", instead using the euphemism "doing it". Other moments emphasising his childlike nature include a series of nervous tics, twitches and stutters exhibited by Kenny, as well as a moment where he urinates himself out of terror when forced to commit a bank robbery.

Sophie Gilbert of The Atlantic compared the episode to previous episodes with contemporary settings—series one's "The National Anthem" and series two's "White Bear" and "The Waldo Moment". She also compared it to the 2001 special episode "Paedogeddon!" of the television news satire Brass Eye, which Brooker co-wrote. "Paedogeddon!" aimed to "lampoon the kind of moral panic and mob fury that's unleashed whenever the subject of child abuse is up for debate." Fitz-Gerald, Gilbert and Zack Handlen of The A.V. Club commented that the episode's themes resemble those in "White Bear". Handlen wrote that the audience must question "the danger of unsupervised vigilantism even when the victims arguably deserve what's coming to them", calling Kenny a "still sympathetic" character "not deserving" of his punishment, though he is "disturbed and troubled and in need of some serious counseling." Fitz-Gerald believed that all of the characters are "depraved [...] to a degree", noting that the internet brings out bad behaviour in people.

Handlen called the episode "one of the most pervasive nightmares of the modern age", as it asks: "What if someone's watching you at your most vulnerable?" Mullane opined that the episode is "a cautionary tale about placing yourself in precarious positions online, particularly when it comes to sexting, images, and pornography". Fitz-Gerald summarised that the episode was a "hypothetical extreme" of hacking and trolling, and asked whether human nature and advanced technology are compatible. However, Caroline Framke of Vox believed that although the episode "might ostensibly be about the dangers of hacking, or trying to live a double life in a world that makes secrets all too easy to access", it relies on the feeling of shame. The episode asks: "How far would you go to keep your shame safely hidden?"

Josh Dzieza of The Verge commented that the anonymous hackers mark "a bit of a departure" for the programme, which usually does not feature "overt villains". Mullane analysed that the hackers' identities do not need to be revealed as they are "effectively a stand-in for The Internet: all-seeing, all-knowing, and extremely dangerous." The supposed malware remover that Kenny downloads is called "shrive", a word from Middle English meaning "to prescribe penance" (the same root word is used for Shrove Tuesday). Gilbert commented that in light of this, "the gauntlet Kenny, Hector, and others are forced to run throughout the episode seems to be a kind of punishment for their sins, but at the end, none of them are forgiven."

== Reception ==
Rotten Tomatoes reported that 67% of critics have given the episode a positive review based on 24 reviews, with an average rating of 8.50/10. The site's critics consensus reads, "Terrifically tense and twisty, "Shut Up and Dance" is well-paced and incredibly unsettling, leaving viewers stunned and with a greater distaste for humanity than normally evoked from an average episode [of] Black Mirror." "Shut Up and Dance" received ratings of five out of five stars by Robbie Collin of The Daily Telegraph, four out of five stars by Pat Stacey of The Irish Independent and a B class rating by Zack Handlen of The A.V. Club. The episode's themes received mixed reception. Mullane wrote that the story was no deeper than one where "bad people do bad things and then get punished for it." Gilbert called it redundant to series two episode "White Bear", saying that there was "no clear message or moment of redemption to take away from it." However, Handlen approved of the episode's themes, praising its "willingness to force moral questions that make everyone feel awful."

Alex Lawther's performance as Kenny was universally well received. Described by Tim Goodman of The Hollywood Reporter as "one of the best things of 2016", Handlen concurred that Lawther is "the real stand-out" of the episode, while Mullane wrote that he is "superb in the main role". Dzieza praised Lawther's portrayal of "adolescent desperation", whilst Framke commented that his depiction of Kenny was "quivering, desperate, heartbreaking." Framke stated that Lawther's "incredible, vulnerable performance" made her "sympathise with his terror", which she found crucial to the twist.

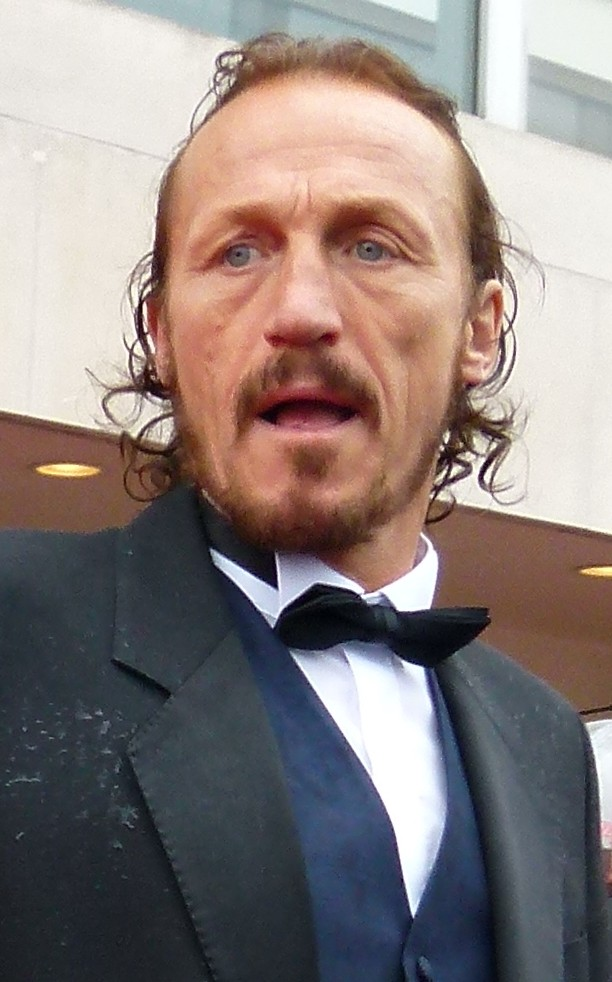
Jerome Flynn plays Hector; Alex Mullane of Digital Spy praised that his character is "suitably sleazy, without ever being a caricature".

Jerome Flynn's acting of Hector was also praised. Mullane wrote that his character is "suitably sleazy, without ever being a caricature", whilst Framke praised his "coiled anger", describing the character as "gruff and to the point" and "furious at his total helplessness". Dzieza praised Flynn's "unsettling" contrast between "gruffness and utilitarian friendliness". Collin opined that "the deliciously horrible details of Flynn’s performance sell you on his character's predicament in a snap." However, Handlen commented that though Flynn "does a fine job", the episode is not a "showcase" for him.

Critics were polarised as to whether the tone of the episode was effective. Whilst Matt Fowler of IGN wrote that it was "remarkably heart-pounding" and Stacey found it "fantastically tense", Gilbert commented that it "felt like too much of an endurance test" and Framke believed that there was not much suspense prior to the twist ending. Fitz-Gerald experienced a "mounting sense of anxiety" as "Kenny's hopelessness as a puppet to anonymous sociopaths is palpable", but Adam Chitwood of Collider found the tension too frustrating, and Handlen wrote that the episode is "never boring, but it's not all that engaging, either." Gilbert found it more upsetting than any prior episode, and Dzieza commented that the episode's aesthetics are "chilly and claustrophobic". Dzieza further said that the "queasiness" up to the twist is "well orchestrated", but found the ending "a letdown". Stacey said that the episode was "blackly funny", with Gilbert concurring that the scenes involving Hector's wife's friend Karen contained some of the darkest humour of the show.

The twist ending in which Kenny is revealed to be a pedophile received a mixed reaction from critics. Handlen opined that it is "not quite powerful enough to make up for everything that came before it", with Framke agreeing that it "doesn't hit that hard". Fitz-Gerald said that "I half hate it, half love it." Mullane called it "a huge gut-punch", but criticised that "it also removes any anchor for investment in any of these characters." Dzieza commented that it demonstrated that "the episode is more interested in turning gadgets into weapons of maximum humiliation than in saying anything more interesting about how digital humiliation works." However, Mullane opined that the episode's ending "perfectly captures the bleak mood of the piece and the inescapable claustrophobia of these people's situations."

Director James Watkins was praised by Mullane and Collin for creating tension, with Collin writing that Watkins "keeps his camera on its feet and hungry" during moments of tension and Kenny's chase sequences. However, the episode was criticised as too long by Framke and Chitwood, with Framke attributing this to the programme's move to Netflix.

=== Black Mirror episode rankings ===
"Shut Up and Dance" appeared on many critics' rankings of the 23 installments in the Black Mirror series, from best to worst.

- 1st – Morgan Jeffery and Rosie Fletcher, Digital Spy
- 8th – Matt Donnelly and Tim Molloy, TheWrap
- 8th – Corey Atad, Esquire
- 15th – Charles Bramesco, Vulture
- 18th – Ed Power, The Telegraph
- 19th – Aubrey Page, Collider
- 19th – Travis Clark, Business Insider

Following the fifth series, Brian Tallerico of Vulture rated Lawther's performance as Kenny the eleventh best performance in the show. Additionally, Proma Khosla of Mashable ranked the 22 Black Mirror instalments excluding Bandersnatch by tone, concluding that "Shut Up and Dance" was the second most bleak after "The Waldo Moment".

The episode also appears on critics' rankings of the 19 episodes from series 1 to series 4:

- 4th – Eric Anthony Glover, Entertainment Tonight
- 17th – Steve Greene, Hanh Nguyen and Liz Shannon Miller, IndieWire

Other critics ranked the 13 episodes in Black Mirror's first three series.

- 4th (of the Top Ten) – Brendan Doyle, Comingsoon.net
- 10th – Mat Elfring, GameSpot
- 11th – Andrew Wallenstein, Variety
- 13th – Jacob Hall, /Film
- 13th – Adam David, CNN Philippines

Some critics ranked the six episodes from series three of Black Mirror in order of quality.

- 1st – Jacob Stolworthy and Christopher Hooton, The Independent
- 2nd – Liam Hoofe, Flickering Myth

== See also ==
- Blue Whale Challenge
- Momo Challenge hoax
- Sextortion
- 764 (organization)
