= Simon Amstell =

English comedian (born 1979)

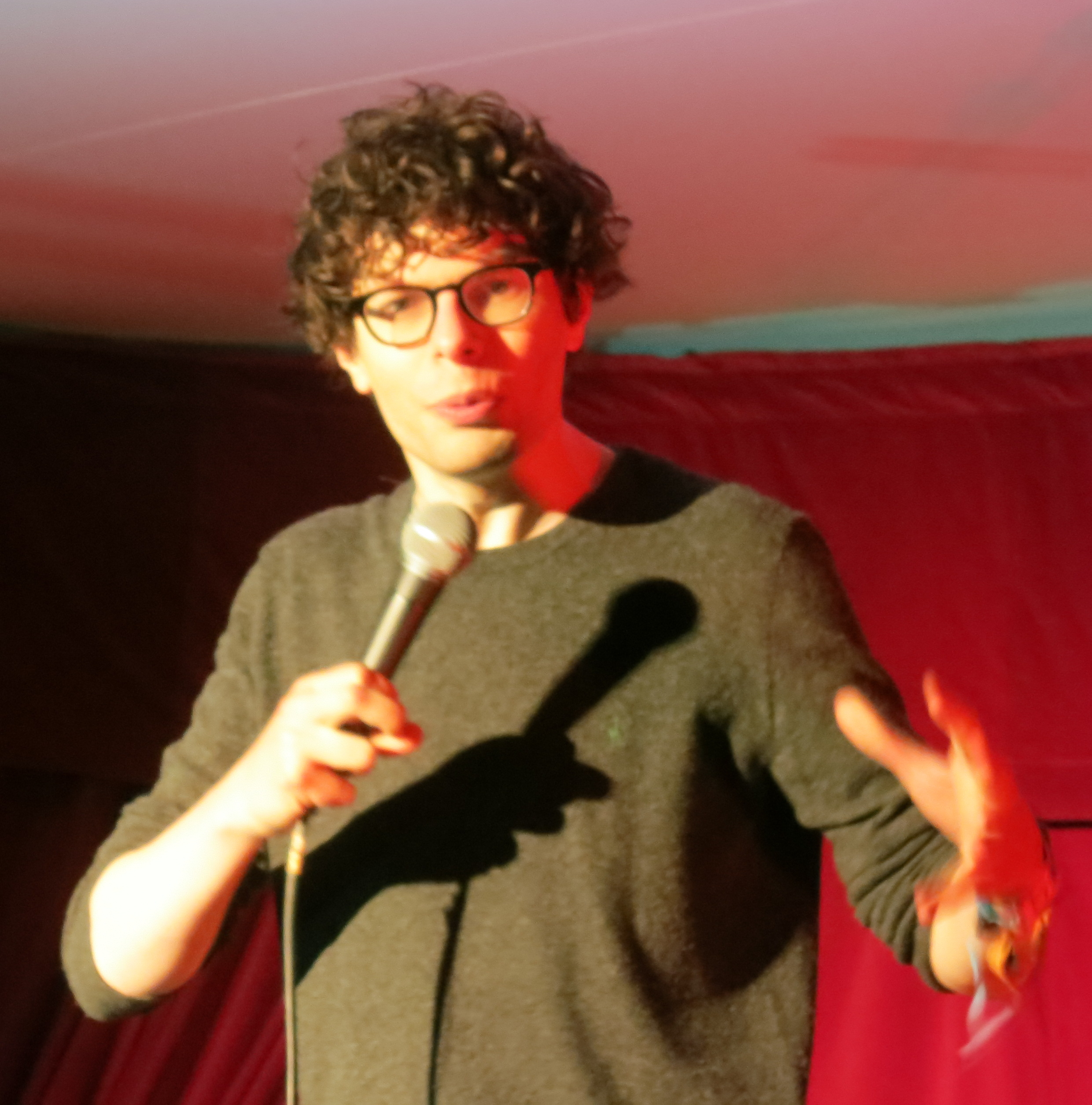
- Amstell in 2013
- Born: Simon Marc Amstell; 29 November 1979 (age 46); Gants Hill, London, England
- Occupations: Stand-up comedian, television presenter, screenwriter, director, actor
- Years active: 1993–present
- Website: simonamstell.co.uk

Simon Marc Amstell (born 29 November 1979) is an English comedian, writer and director. He wrote and directed the films Carnage (2017) and Benjamin (2018). His work on television has included presenting Popworld and Never Mind the Buzzcocks.

== Early years ==
Amstell was born in east London in 1979, to David and Tina (née Leventhal) Amstell. He was brought up in a Jewish family, and he is the eldest of four children. He was educated at Beal High School, a state comprehensive school in Ilford, east London.

== Life and career ==
Amstell's first television appearance was in 1993 when he appeared as a contestant on the Channel 4 game show GamesMaster. In 1994, he appeared on Good Morning with Anne and Nick performing an impression of Dame Edna Everage. Also that year, he appeared in an episode of Family Catchphrase, describing himself as a budding magician and showing one of his tricks to the show's presenter Andrew O'Connor, himself a magician. Amstell and his family won a television and a video recorder.

Amstell started performing on the comedy circuit when he was in his early teens and later became the youngest finalist to appear in the BBC New Comedy Awards. His first professional television appearance was in 1998 as a presenter on the UK children's channel Nickelodeon. He claims he was sacked for being "sarcastic and mean to children," although the posted biography on his website also, in jest, claims:

"He started his TV career at Nickelodeon where he was fired for making pop stars uncomfortable. He then began presenting the Channel 4 show, Popworld – where he gained a huge following for his groundbreaking work in making pop stars uncomfortable."

=== Popworld ===
From 2000 to 2006, Amstell presented Popworld on Channel 4 with Miquita Oliver. He voiced the characters "Timothy the Popworld melon" and "Richard the Popworld horse" and developed a highly ironic, surreal and left-field style which gained the show a cult following but angered many of its guests. One example was a mock interview with singer Lemar called "Lemar From Afar" in which Amstell shouted questions into a megaphone from one end of the world's largest car park while Lemar stood at the other end. Another was a "Si-chiatrist" interview with Luke Pritchard and Hugh Harris of The Kooks in which Amstell played the role of psychiatrist with Pritchard and Harris as his patients.

=== Never Mind the Buzzcocks ===
Amstell first appeared on the comedy show Never Mind the Buzzcocks as a guest during Mark Lamarr's tenure as host, in 2003 and 2006. Following Lamarr's departure, he was one of the series' guest hosts before becoming permanent host from 2006 to 2009. He said at the time that he hoped to beat "the universal, exceptionless rule that when a new host takes over an old show it is a horrible, embarrassing disaster".

In June 2007, Amstell and long-term collaborator Dan Swimer wrote Imagine... A Mildly Amusing Panel Show, a spoof version of Alan Yentob's arts programme Imagine. Yentob and Amstell play themselves in a mock interview between what a number of commentators described as "overtly sexual" clips taken from Amstell's Never Mind the Buzzcocks episodes. It was followed in February 2008 by Never Mind the Buzzcocks: A Moving Tribute, which jokingly implied that Amstell had either died or retired from the show.

On 25 April 2009, Amstell announced via his internet mailing list that he would not be hosting another series of Never Mind the Buzzcocks because of his desire to concentrate on his live tours and stand-up performances.

Amstell received several accolades for his work on Never Mind the Buzzcocks. In 2007, he won the Royal Television Society Award for Best Entertainment Performance and the British Comedy Award for Best Comedy Entertainment Personality. And in 2008, he received a nomination for the BAFTA Award for Best Entertainment Performance; Harry Hill won the award. Moreover, Amstell's era was the reason why Never Mind the Buzzcocks was chosen as the 36th-best TV show of the decade by The Times.

== Writing and directing ==
=== Grandma's House ===
In 2009, BBC Two commissioned a six-part series titled Grandma's House from Tiger Aspect Productions, written by and starring Amstell, co-written by Dan Swimer. The show was commissioned after the airing of a pilot earlier the same year. Filming started in February 2010 and broadcasting began in August 2010.

Grandma's House received a generally positive reaction from critics and audiences alike and Samantha Spiro, who played 'Liz' won a British Comedy Award.

In April 2012, the second series of Grandma's House began airing. Amstell announced this would be the last series.

=== Carnage ===
On 19 March 2017, Amstell's mockumentary Carnage premiered on BBC iPlayer. It is set in the year 2067, when the UK is vegan, and older generations are suffering the guilt of their carnist past.

=== Benjamin ===
In 2018, Amstell wrote and directed the feature film Benjamin, which premiered on 19 October 2018 at the BFI London Film Festival.

=== Maria ===
In 2022, it was announced that Amstell has written and will direct a new feature film, Maria.

=== Other works ===
Amstell directed a series of shorts written by Jessie Cave starring Olly Alexander.

In 2015, he wrote and directed the short film William, starring Alex Lawther.

In 2016, Amstell wrote and directed Something More for Channel 4.

On 21 September 2017, Amstell published his first book, Help, a collection of annotated stand-up scripts and linked stories.

== Stand up ==
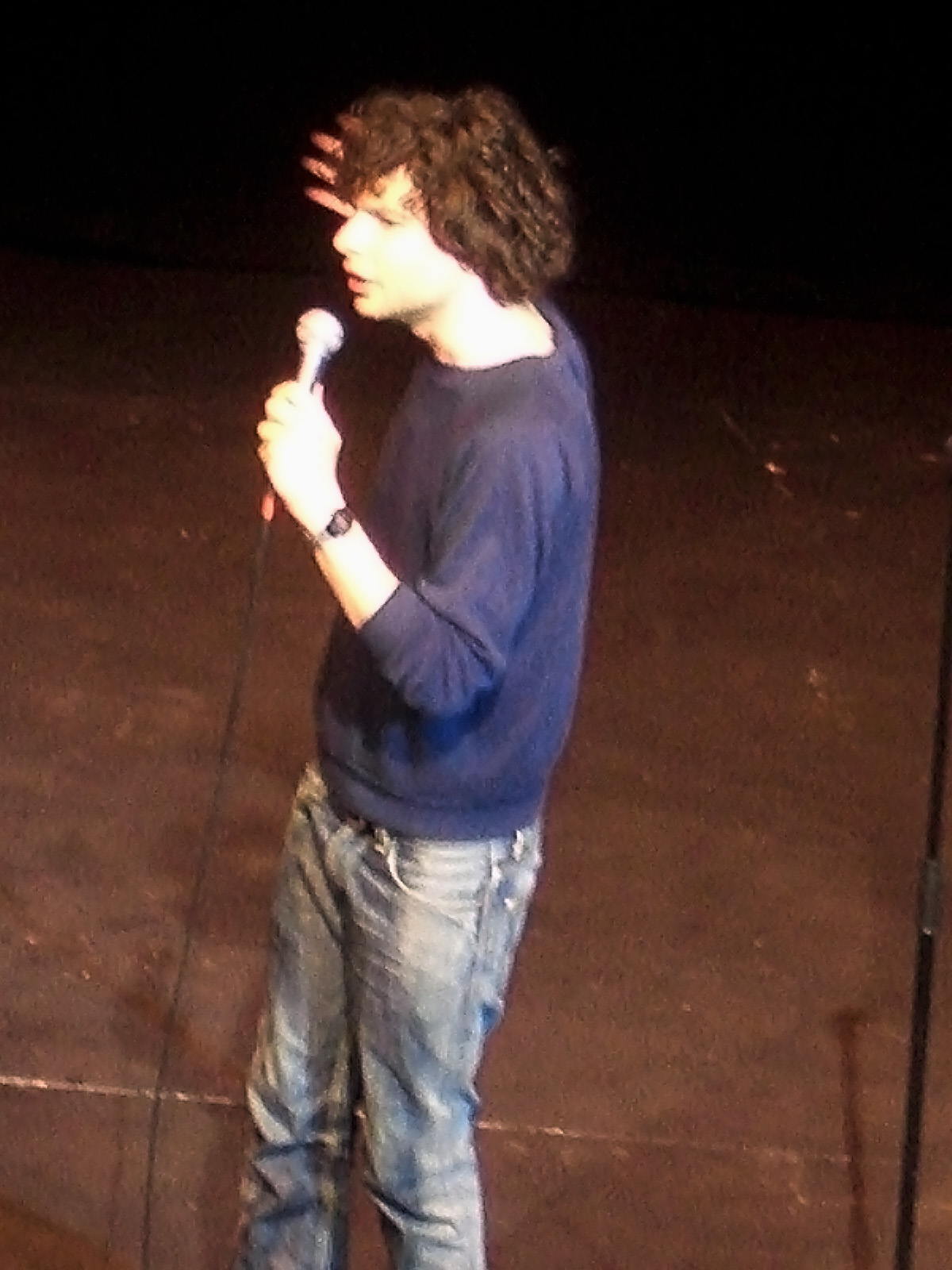
Simon Amstell at One Big Laugh, Bloomsbury Theatre, 2006.

Amstell also performs as a stand-up comedian. He has performed at the Edinburgh Festival Fringe in 2005, 2006, 2007 and 2009. In 2008, Amstell completed his first UK tour. He appeared at the Just for Laughs Comedy Festival in Montreal in July 2009. His entire run at the Edinburgh Fringe Festival 2009 at the Bongo Club sold out. He took part in his second national tour in the autumn of 2009.

Amstell performed Do Nothing in 2009 at the Royal Court Theatre, raising money for their young writers programme.

In May 2010, Amstell recorded Do Nothing in Dublin's Vicar Street venue for a November DVD release. In December 2011 and April 2012, it was shown on BBC3 and the BBC iPlayer.

In April 2012, Amstell performed at the Melbourne International Comedy Festival.

From May to June 2012, Amstell began his 'Numb Tour' in the UK and Ireland.

From 10 July to 9 August 2012, Amstell performed 'Numb' in New York City at Theatre 80 in the East Village.

On New Year's Eve 2012, a one-off stand-up special performance of Simon Amstell's stand-up show, 'Numb', which he toured to sell-out audiences in 2012, was recorded for the BBC at TV Centre.

In 2014, Amstell announced a new tour of UK and North America, titled 'TO BE FREE'.

In 2017, Amstell announced his third stand-up UK tour, titled 'What Is This?'. It began in London on 22 September 2017.

In 2019, Amstell announced the release of an hour-long Netflix stand-up special, 'Set Free', which premiered on 20 August.

In 2021-22, Amstell toured a new show, 'Spirit Hole'.

== Miscellaneous work ==
Amstell co-wrote an episode of Channel 4 teenage drama Skins in 2007, titled "Maxxie and Anwar".

In 2011, Amstell appeared in the independent film Black Pond.

In 2015, he provided voice work for the video game Dr. Langeskov, The Tiger, and The Terribly Cursed Emerald: A Whirlwind Heist.

In 2016, Amstell hosted the Evening Standard British Film Awards.

In 2025, Amstell guest hosted 2 episodes of Miss Me, podcast of former Popworld co host, Miquita Oliver.

== Personal life ==
Amstell lives in London. He is Jewish, gay, vegan and abstains from alcohol.
