= Salome Hocking =

Salome Hocking Fifield (née Hocking; April 1859 – April 1927) was a Cornish novelist. She was born at Terras, St Stephen-in-Brannel, Cornwall, to James Hocking, a mine agent, and his wife Elizabeth (née Kitto). She was one of seven siblings, all of whom were given biblical names. Her brothers, Silas Kitto Hocking and Joseph Hocking, were also novelists, as well as being Methodist ministers. In 1894 she married the publisher A. C. (Arthur Charles) Fifield.

== Biography ==
=== Early life ===
Growing up at Terras, Hocking was surrounded by the china clay mining and tin mining industries, the latter appears regularly in her work. Her father turned to farming because of a decline in the mining industry and, one day in her teens, while helping out pitching corn sheaves, she seriously injured her spine. Her shoulder and hip where twisted in opposite directions resulting in a double curvature. Hocking did not seek treatment at the time, hiding the injury under her long hair. She never told her family about the accident that was the reason for her 'bad back.' Attempts at treatment in later life were not successful and she was often in pain.

Hocking took up writing (her brothers were already authors), after the premature death of her father. She produced stories set in the familiar Cornish environments of mining, farming and seafaring. During the 1880s she produced five novels in quick succession - Granny's Hero (1885); The Fortunes of Riverside or Waiting and Winning (1885); Norah Lang (1886); Jacky (1887) and Chronicles of a Quiet Family (1888).

She taught at the village school in nearby Coombe, was involved with the United Methodist church at St Stephen-in-Brannel as an organist and choir leader, and also sang contralto in a chapel quartet which travelled around Cornwall.

Hocking lived at Terras until her mother's death in 1891. For the following three years she lived alternately with her brother Joseph at Thornton Heath, Surrey and her brother Silas at Southport. She published only A Conquered Self during this time, and that under the pseudonym of S. Moore-Carew (the name taken from an ancestor on her mother's side of the family).

=== Marriage and later life ===
It was while living with one of her brothers that she met Arthur Charles Fifield, a publisher. They were married on Christmas Eve 1894. In 1903 Hocking published Some Old Cornish Folk (under her maiden name of Salome Hocking rather than the previous pseudonym or her married name). The book is a portrait of various characters and local stories from her parish of St Stephen-in-Brannel.

It was through her husband's literary social circle that she met such people as George Bernard Shaw (1856 - 1950) and Samuel Butler (1835 - 1902). It was also through her husband that she came to know a group of Russian and Continental Tolstoyan exiles. Her later novels Beginnings and Belinda the Backward (1905), were inspired by the Tolstoyan association. Belinda the Backward is set in a fictional version of the Whiteway Colony with which Salome and Arthur were involved. It is not known whether the couple lived at the colony full-time as some of the records have not survived but Arthur Fifield was one of the original organisers who helped raise money to set up the colony.

In 1909 the couple moved to a small house on the Smitham Downs at Coulsdon in Surrey which Hocking chose to name Trenowth Cottage after the woods near to her family home in Cornwall.

During the First World War she was a member of the Coulsdon Women War-Work Party, spending much of her time knitting items such as mufflers and bedsocks for the men at the front.

When Hocking was well enough to entertain, the house was open to large numbers friends and acquaintances, including those connected with various Tolstoyan groups.

=== Final years ===
Declining health connected to her back injury made it increasingly harder for her to write. She often lacked energy and suffered from almost constant headaches. According to her husband she had completed a first typed draft of a Cornish novel called Pensweeta but was not well enough to ready it for publication. In the final seven or eight years of her life her disabilities were the reason for an almost complete withdrawal from social life. She died at home at Trenowth Cottage on 10 April 1927 aged 68.

== Complete works ==
- Granny's Hero: A Tale of Country Life (1885)
- The Fortunes of Riverside or Waiting and Winning (1885)
- Norah Lang: The Mine Girl (1886)
- Jacky: A Story of Everyday Life (1887)
- Chronicles of a Quiet Family: A Temperance Story (1888)
- A Conquered Self (1894) - published under the pseudonym S. Moore Carew
- Some Old Cornish Folk (1903)
- Belinda the Backward: A Romance of Modern Idealism (1905)
- Beginnings (no date)
