= Joseph Hocking =

British writer (1860–1937)

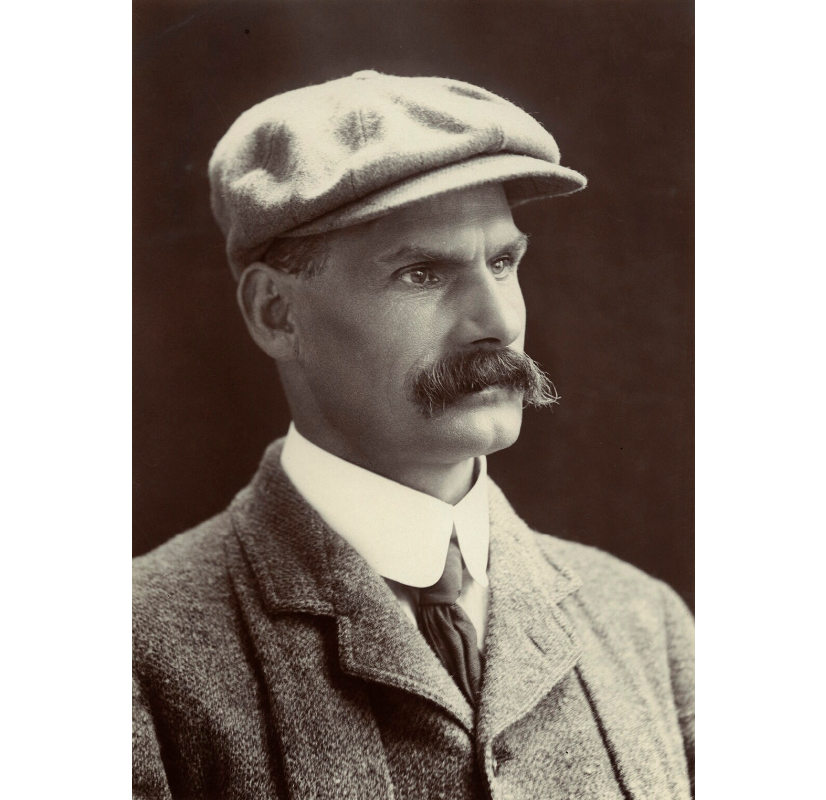
Joseph Hocking (1860-1937)

Joseph Hocking (7 November 1860 – 4 March 1937) was a Cornish novelist and United Methodist Free Church minister.

== Life ==
Hocking was born at St Stephen-in-Brannel, Cornwall, to James Hocking, part-owner of a tin mine, and his wife Elizabeth (Kitto) Hocking.

In 1884, he was ordained as a Methodist minister. Working in different parts of England over the next few years, he wrote his first novel, Harry Penhale - The Trial of his Faith, while in London in 1887. He regarded fiction as a highly effective medium for conveying his Christian message to the public, and combined his writing with his church duties, until ill health forced him to resign from the ministry in 1909. His last pastoral charge was the large and important United Free Church at Woodford, Essex, which he was instrumental in having rebuilt by the advanced arts and crafts architect, Charles Harrison Townsend.

On his recovery, he found himself a much sought-after preacher across Britain, and he travelled extensively in the Middle East.

Hocking's combined bibliography stands at nearly 100 books.

He died in St Ives, Cornwall, and was survived by his wife, Annie, who he had married in 1887, and four daughters, three of whom become published novelists in their own right (Anne Hocking, Elizabeth Nisot and Joan Shill). A son, Cuthbert, was killed in action in World War I.

Through his mother he was related to the biblical scholar John Kitto. His brother was Silas Hocking (1850–1935), a novelist and Methodist minister, and his sister, Salome Hocking (1859–1927), was also a novelist.

Hocking features as one of the main characters in the 2009 play Surfing Tommies by Cornish playwright, Alan M. Kent.

Joseph Hocking's ashes were buried in the churchyard of St Stephen-in-Brannel.

== Selected works ==
- Harry Penhale, the Trial of his Faith (1887)
- Gideon Strong, Plebeian (1888)
- Jabez Easterbrook: a Religious Novel (1890)
- The Weapons of Mystery (1890)
- Elrad the Hic: a Romance of the Sea of Galilee (1890)
- Zillah: A Romance (1892)
- Ishmael Pengelly, an Outcast (1893)
- The Story of Andrew Fairfax (1893)
- The Monk of Mar-Saba (1894)
- The Mist on the Moors: a Romance of North Cornwall (1895)
- Fields of Fair Renown (1896)
- And Shall Trelawney Die? and, The Mist on the Moors: being Romances of the Parish of Altarnun in Cornwall (1897)
- The Birthright: being the Adventurous History of Jaspar Pennington (1897)
- Mistress Nancy Molesworth: a Tale of Adventure (1898)
- The Scarlet Woman; a Novel (1899)
- The Purple Robe (1900)
- The Madness of David Baring (1900)
- O'er Moor and Fen: a Tale of Methodist Life in Lancashire (1901)
- Lest We Forget (1901)
- Greater Love: a Cornish Romance (1902)
- A Flame of Fire (1903)
- Follow the gleam: a Tale of the time of Oliver Cromwell (1903) A Historical novel about the English Civil War
- Esau and St. Issey (1904)
- The Coming of the King (1904)
- Roger Trewinion (1905)
- The Chariots of the Lord (1905)
- The Man who Rose Again (1906)
- The Woman of Babylon (1907)
- A Strong Man's Vow (1907)
- The Trampled Cross (1907)
- The Soul of Dominic Wildthorne (1908)
- The Sword of the Lord: a Romance of the Time of Martin Luther (1909)
- The Prince of This World (1910)
- The Wilderness (1911)
- The Jesuit (1911)
- The Bells of St Ia (1911)
- Is Home Rule Rome Rule? (1912)
- God and Mammon (1912)
- Rosaleen O'Hara: a Romance of Ireland (1912)
- The Spirit of the West (1913)
- All Men are Liars (1914)
- Facing Fearful Odds (1914)
- An Enemy Hath Done This (1914)
- Dearer than Life: a Romance of the Great War (1915)
- All for a Scrap of Paper: a Romance of the Present War (1915)
- The Day of Judgement (1915)
- Tommy: a War Story (1916)
- The Passion for Life (1916)
- The Curtain of Fire (1916)
- The Path of Glory (1917)
- Tommy and the Maid of Athens (1917)
- The Pomp of Yesterday (1918)
- The Price of a Throne (1918)
- The Everlasting Arms (1920)
- In the Sweat of Thy Brow (1920)
- The Man who Almost Lost (1920)
- Prodigal Daughters (1922)
- The Girl who Defied the World (1922)
- The Game and the Candle (1923)
- The Case of Miss Dunstable (1923)
- Prodigal Parents (1923)
- What Shall it Profit a Man (1924)
- Rosemary Carew: Just a Love Story (1925)
- The All Conquering Power (1925)
- The Wagon and the Star (1925)
- Heartsease: the Story of a Feud (1926)
- Bevil Granville's Handicap (1926)
- Andrew Boconnoc's Will: the Story of a Crisis (1927)
- The Tenant of Cromlech Cottage (1927)
- Felicity Treverbyn: a Love Story (1928)
- The Constant Enemy (1929)
- The Sign of the Triangle (1929)
- The God that Answers by Fire (1930)
- Nancy Trevanion's Legacy (1930)
- The Dust of Life (1930)
- The Eternal Challenge (1930)
- Out of the Depths (1930)
- The Secret of Trescobell (1931)
- The Man who was Sure (1931)
- The Eternal Choice (1932)
- Caleb's Conquest (1932)
- Not One in Ten (1933)
- No Other Name (1934)
- And Grant a Leader Bold (1934)
- The Squire of Zabuloe (1936)
- Deep Calleth unto Deep (1936)
- Davey's Ambition (1936)

== Sources ==
- Alan M. Kent, Pulp Methodism. The Lives & Literature of Silas, Joseph & Salome Hocking, Cornish Hillside Publications, 2002.
