= Alex Lawther =

British actor (born 1995)

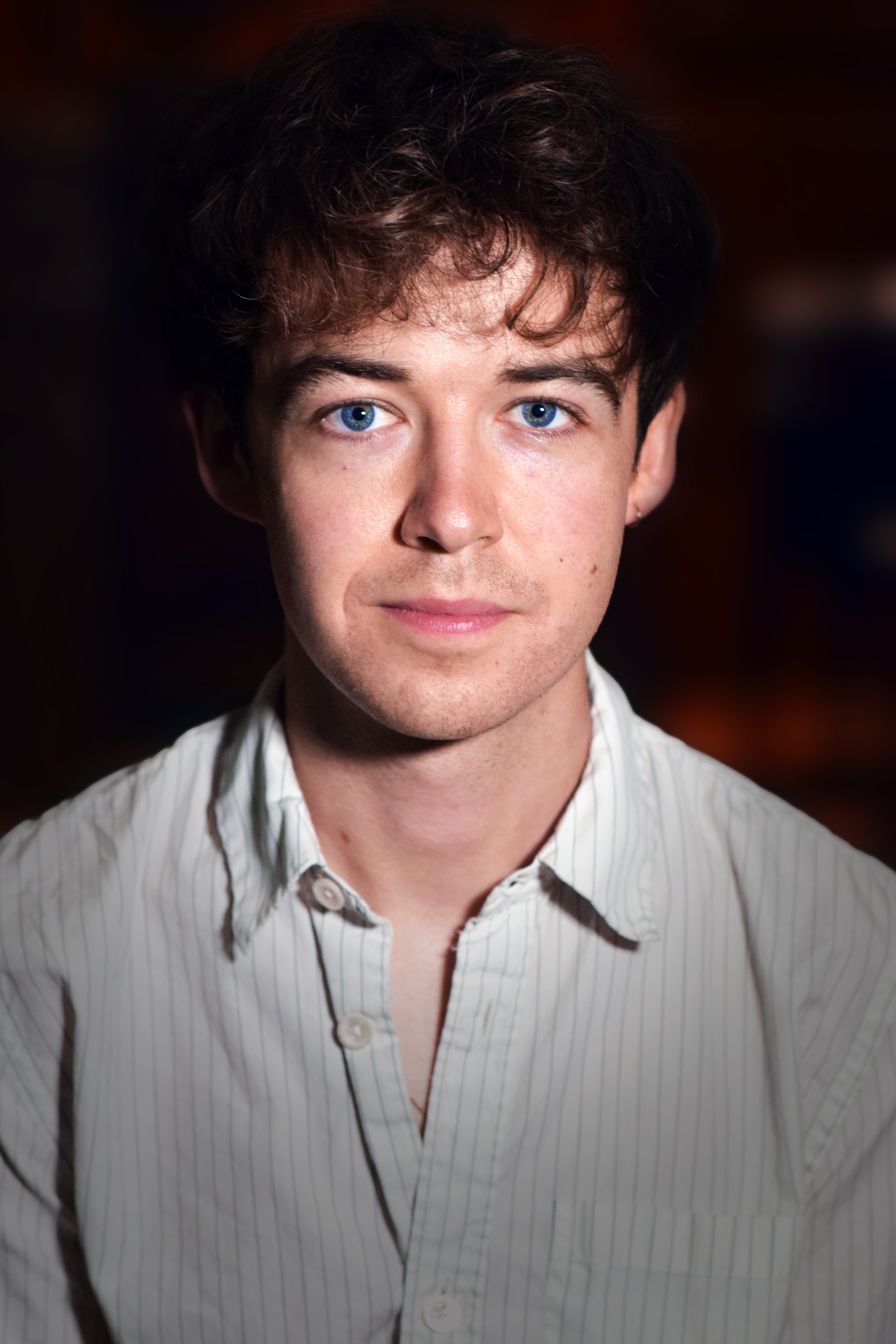
- Lawther in 2022
- Born: Alexander Jonathan Lawther; 4 May 1995 (age 31); Winchester, Hampshire, England
- Citizenship: United Kingdom; Ireland
- Education: Churcher's College; National Youth Theatre
- Occupation: Actor
- Years active: 2010–present
- Known for: The End of the F***ing World; Black Mirror; The Imitation Game; South Downs; Andor

Alexander Jonathan Lawther (born 4 May 1995) is an English actor, writer, and director. He made his professional acting debut originating the role of John Blakemore in Sir David Hare's South Downs in the West End. He made his feature film debut playing a young Alan Turing in the Academy Award-winning film The Imitation Game (2014), for which he received the London Film Critics' Circle Award for "Young British Performer of the Year" and was declared one of BAFTA's 2015 Breakthrough Brits.

He achieved more mainstream success for his role as Kenny in "Shut Up and Dance", an episode of the Netflix anthology series Black Mirror (2016), and for portraying the lead role of James in the Channel 4 series The End of the F***ing World (2017–2019). His other notable work includes his roles in Freak Show, Howards End, Goodbye Christopher Robin, Ghost Stories, The Last Duel, Andor, and Alien: Earth. On screen, he is known for his frequent portrayals of outsiders and eccentric characters.

== Early life ==
Lawther was born in Winchester, Hampshire and raised in Petersfield. He is of English and Irish descent, possessing dual British and Irish citizenship through his Irish father, who is from Northern Ireland. The son of two lawyers, Lawther has described himself as having come from a "white middle-class bubble". As the youngest of three children, he said that his aspiration to be an actor came from having to make up his own games to entertain himself as a child. Both of his siblings live and work in the United States, with his older brother, Cameron Lawther, being a Hollywood film producer, and his older sister Ellie Lawther working in public policy.

Lawther was educated at Churcher's College, an independent school in Petersfield. After getting into trouble for creating an illegitimate drama club at his school with friends, Lawther became heavily involved in the drama programme when an official one was started. He played Ratty in The Wind in the Willows, Sir Toby Belch in Twelfth Night, and Lucas in The Third Bank of the River, and received the Sir Daniel Day-Lewis Award by the Petersfield Town Council. In 2009, a fourteen-year-old Lawther was allowed to write and direct his own full-length play based on a song by Sara Bareilles entitled Rejected Fairytales as part of his drama club involvement, where he received laudatory coverage in the local press as a "theatrical whiz kid" who would end up working as an actor in the West End.

In 2010, he joined the National Youth Theatre, where he received his only formal training as an actor. He also collaborated with his brother as an actor on his short film The Fear, made when the elder Lawther was applying to film school. He did not study drama at GCSE or A level. He initially planned to read History at King's College London, but ultimately gave up his place after being cast in The Imitation Game; instead, he moved to London at 18 to pursue acting professionally.

== Career ==
=== 2011–2016: early roles ===
Lawther's professional debut came at the age of 16, when he appeared as John Blakemore in Sir David Hare's South Downs at Chichester Festival Theatre. Lawther found out about an open audition for the play through his school, as the casting directors were scouting real students attending elite private schools in the South Downs for the play's public school setting. He travelled to London, where he beat hundreds of other young actors for the lead role. After a local trial run, the play then went to the West End, where he performed the role at the Harold Pinter Theatre in sold out runs whilst still studying for his A Levels. He received critical acclaim for his performance and, having previously viewed acting as only a hobby, he was encouraged to pursue a career in film and theatre. Shortly thereafter, he signed a contract with a film agent.

Following his performance in South Downs, Lawther spent much of his early career playing wealthy English schoolboys. After several small television roles, he portrayed Benjamin Britten as a schoolboy in the docudrama by Tony Britten, Benjamin Britten: Peace and Conflict (2013), also featuring John Hurt as the narrator. Lawther received his breakthrough film role as a young Alan Turing during his time at Sherborne School in the Academy Award-winning film The Imitation Game (2014), with Benedict Cumberbatch portraying the older Turing. The role won him the London Film Critics' Circle Award for "Young British Performer of the Year". Subsequently, he appeared in a supporting role as a maths prodigy in the critically acclaimed coming-of-age drama film X+Y, alongside Asa Butterfield and Sally Hawkins. He also starred as a young castrato in Virtuoso, a pilot produced for HBO by Alan Ball, but the show was not picked up by the network. He returned to the theatre doing various small productions in London during this period, playing a sexually precocious young gay man in The Glass Supper, and the lead in the post-apocalyptic Crushed Shells and Mud.

In 2015, he starred alongside Juliet Stevenson in his first lead film role, playing Elliot in the British film, Departure, the debut film of director Andrew Steggall, filmed in a mixture of French and English.

=== 2016–present: wider recognition ===
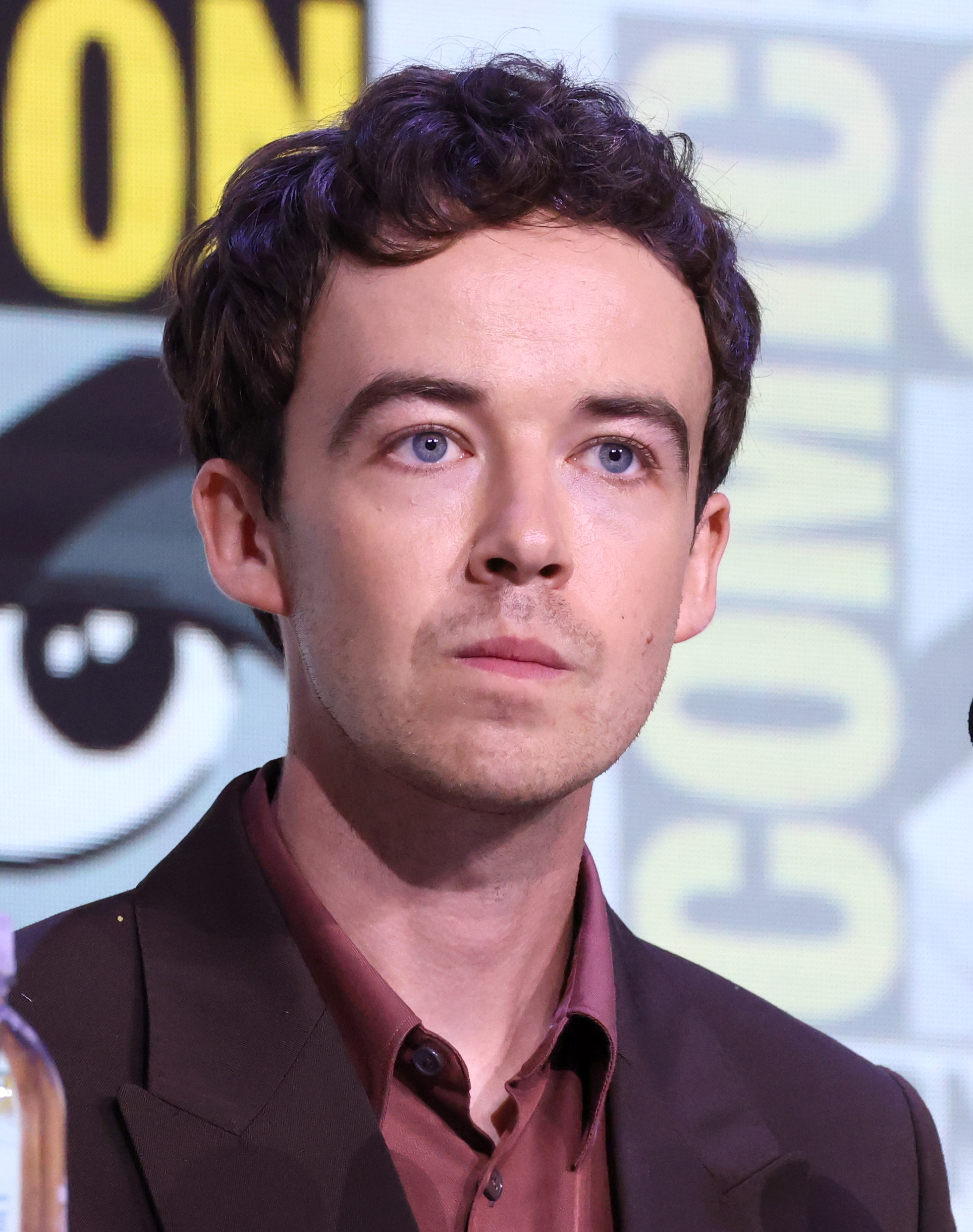
Lawther at the 2025 San Diego Comic-Con to promote Alien: Earth

In 2016, Lawther played the main character Kenny in "Shut Up and Dance", an episode from series three of the British science fiction anthology series Black Mirror. While the episode overall received mixed reviews, he received universal acclaim and significant recognition for his performance. He also performed in the mockumentary film Carnage, directed by his frequent collaborator, comedian Simon Amstell.

In 2017, Lawther played Tibby Schlegel in Howards End, a BBC One adaptation of the E.M. Forster novel that starred Hayley Atwell, as well as the lead role of Billy Bloom in Trudie Styler's Freak Show, where he was supported by Bette Midler, Abigail Breslin, AnnaSophia Robb, Lorraine Toussaint and Larry Pine. Freak Show marked his first (and thus far only) appearance in an American film.

Later that same year, he also starred, alongside Jessica Barden, as James in the Peabody Award-winning television series The End of the F***ing World. The role also brought Lawther more acclaim from critics and further raised his profile in the entertainment industry. He would go on to reprise this role during the show's second and final season, which received a BAFTA Award for Best Drama. He also originated the role of Sam in the Stephen Daltry-directed play The Jungle, which focused on the refugee crisis in Calais, in both its London and New York productions. Lawther spent time in France meeting with refugees for this job, and ultimately found it to be one of his most challenging roles due to his character's right-wing views which were antithetical to his own. Subsequently, Lawther played the lead role of Amberson in Toby MacDonald's debut film Old Boys, as well as a supporting role in the horror film Ghost Stories.

In 2020, Lawther played the lead role in Régis Roinsard's thriller, Les Traducteurs (The Translators), his first non-English language film. As a result of fans of both Lawther and English singer-songwriter Declan McKenna frequently pointing out their resemblance, Lawther made an appearance in the music video for McKenna's song "The Key to Life on Earth". In 2021, Lawther appeared in Ridley Scott's The Last Duel, Wes Anderson's The French Dispatch, and Lucile Hadzihalilovic's Earwig. He starred as Ariel in a French production of Shakespeare's The Tempest at Les Bouffes du Nord directed by Peter Brook and Marie-Hélène Estienne and replaced Andrew Scott in the titular role of Hamlet when Robert Icke's adaptation was brought to New York City, after previously being delayed due to the COVID-19 pandemic. He appeared in the Star Wars spin-off series Andor as rebel operative Karis Nemik. In 2022 he provided the voice of Abacus Woodlouse in Aardman Animations' Lloyd of the Flies and in 2023 he also voiced of Bird-Bee and Mr. Beak-Bee in Adventures of ArachnoFly, Lloyd of the Flies' spin-off.

=== Directing ===
In 2021, Lawther made his directorial debut with the music video for "Fountainhead" by Linus Fenton, starring Roman Griffin Davis and sponsored by CALM. In 2022, he wrote and directed the short film For People in Trouble, produced by Ben Affleck and Matt Damon and starring Emma D'Arcy and Archie Madekwe. His short film Rhoda, starring Emma D'Arcy and Juliet Stevenson was selected for the BFI London Film Festival in 2024.

== Personal life ==
Lawther stopped using social media as he began to take more high-profile roles and considers himself to be "technophobic". He has described himself as politically left-wing, and generally tries to avoid discussing his private life when possible. He considers his biggest inspirations as an actor to be Ben Whishaw, Sally Hawkins, and Andrew Scott.

Lawther has been a Francophile and a fan of French cinema from a young age. He speaks fluent French and previously lived in Paris. Lawther currently lives with his partner in London.

=== Activism ===
In 2020, Lawther co-signed an open letter to the government of the United Kingdom to ban conversion therapy for LGBT youth. In 2023, he co-signed an open letter alongside more than 1,000 artists in the British film industry calling on the arts and culture sector to demand a permanent ceasefire in Gaza during the Gaza war, amplify Palestinian voices, and protect artists who speak out in favor of Palestinians. He has also been involved in climate activism with Extinction Rebellion. He is a feminist and has critiqued the lack of diversity in the film industry. He became involved with causes supporting refugees following his work in The Jungle and supports the charity Choose Love.

== Recognition ==
After seeing a sixteen-year-old Lawther's West End debut in South Downs, Dame Maggie Smith reportedly remarked to him that "most of us spend our lives trying to do what you've achieved". For that same performance, he was nominated for a WhatsOnStage Award for "Best Newcomer" and named one of London's "Top 25 Under 25" by the Evening Standard. He has since received the London Film Critics' Circle Award for "Young British Performer of the Year" for The Imitation Game and the Dublin Film Critics Award for "Best Actor" for Departure. With the cast and crew of The Jungle, he received a Special Citation at the Obie Awards for the play's off-off-Broadway production and was cited for his "deeply funny and moving performance" in The End of the F***ing World when the show received a Peabody Award.

Lawther was named as one of BAFTA's Breakthrough Brits for 2015. His acting style has been compared favourably to actor Ben Whishaw, whom he cites as an idol of his.

== Acting credits ==
=== Film ===
Year	Title	Role	Notes	Ref.
2013	Benjamin Britten: Peace and Conflict	Benjamin Britten	Docudrama	
2014	The Imitation Game	young Alan Turing		
2014	X+Y	Isaac Cooper	Released in the U.S. as A Brilliant Young Mind	
2015	Departure	Elliot		
2017	Freak Show	Billy Bloom	Credited as "Alex J. Lawther"	
2017	Goodbye Christopher Robin	Christopher Robin Milne (aged 18)		
2018	Ghost Stories	Simon Rifkind		
2018	Old Boys	Martin Amberson		
2019	The Translators	Alex Goodman	French: Les Traducteurs	
2021	The French Dispatch	Morisot		
2021	The Last Duel	Charles VI		
2021	Earwig	Laurence		
2022	For People in Trouble	—N/a	Writer and director	
2025	A Second Life	Elijah		

=== Television ===
Year	Title	Role	Notes
2014	Holby City	Fred Bamber	Episode: "All Before Them"
2015	Virtuoso	Battista	Episode: "Pilot"
2015	William	Freddy	Television short
2016	Black Mirror	Kenny	Episode: "Shut Up and Dance"
2017	Carnage	Volunteer: Joseph	Mockumentary
2017	Howards End	Tibby Schlegel	Miniseries
2017–2019	The End of the F***ing World	James	Main role, 16 episodes
2020	Unprecedented	Zac	Episode #1.4
2020	Grand Amour		Television film
2021–2022	The Owl House	Philip Wittebane	Voice; 4 episodes
2021, 2023	Summer Camp Island	Mildred's Friend / Additional Voices	Voice; 3 episodes
2022	Lloyd of the Flies	Abacus Woodlouse	Voice; main role
2022–2025	Andor	Karis Nemik	5 episodes
2022	Le patient	Bastien	Television film
2023	The Cleaner	Dan Mangkukulam / Watson	Episode: "The Shaman"
2023	The Velveteen Rabbit	Velveteen Rabbit	Television special
2025	Alien: Earth	Joseph D. "Joe" Hermit	Main role, 7 episodes
2025	Leonard and Hungry Paul	Leonard	Main role, 6 episodes
2026	The Altruists	Sam Trabucco	Supporting role

=== Theatre ===
Year	Title	Role	Venue	Ref.
2011	South Downs	John Blakemore	Chichester Festival Theatre	
2012	South Downs	John Blakemore	Harold Pinter Theatre	
2013	Fault Lines	Ryan	Hampstead Theatre	
2014	The Glass Supper	Jamie	Hampstead Theatre	
2015	Crushed Shells and Mud	Derek	Southwark Playhouse	
2017–2019	The Jungle	Sam	Young Vic Theatre & Playhouse Theatre (2018); St. Ann’s Warehouse	
2021	The Tempest	Caliban/Ferdinand	Théâtre des Bouffes du Nord	
2022	Hamlet	Hamlet	Park Avenue Armory	
2023	Le Conte d’hiver	Léontes	La Scène nationale 61 à Alençon	
2026	Summerfolk	Vlass Mikhailich	Royal National Theatre	

=== Radio ===
Year	Title	Role	Notes	Ref.
2013	South Downs	John Blakemore		
2014	How to Say Goodbye Properly	Toby	BBC Radio 4	
2014	Rock Me Amadeus	Charlie	BBC Radio 4	
2015	Decline and Fall	Peter Beste-Chetwynde	BBC Radio 4	
2020	Murmurs	Lloyd	Episode: "Man's Best Friend"	

=== Podcasts ===
Year	Title	Role	Notes
2018	The London Necropolis Railway	Barney	Main role, 7 episodes
2020	The Painkiller Podcast	Leo	Episode: "Object"

=== Music videos ===
Year	Title	Artist	Album	Role	Notes
2020	"The Key to Life on Earth"	Declan McKenna	Zeros	Himself	
2021	"Fountainhead"	Linus Fenton			Director

== Awards and nominations ==
Year	Award	Category	Nominated work	Result	Refs.
2013	WhatsOnStage Awards	Best Newcomer	South Downs	Nominated	
2014	BFI London Film Festival	Best British Newcomer	The Imitation Game	Nominated	
2015	London Critics' Circle Film Awards	Young British Performer of the Year	The Imitation Game	Won	
2016	Audi Dublin International Film Festival	Best Actor	Departure	Won	
2016	Dinard British Film Festival	Special Mention - Actors	Departure	Won	
2018	International Online Cinema Awards	Best Actor in a Comedy Series	The End of the F***ing World	Nominated	
2018	Fright Meter Awards	Best Supporting Actor	Ghost Stories	Runner-Up	
2019	Obie Awards	Special Citation - Cast and Creative Team	The Jungle	Won	
2024	London Critics' Circle Film Awards	British/Irish Short Film of the Year	For People in Trouble	Nominated	
2024	Annie Awards	Voice Acting in an Animated Television/Media Production	The Velveteen Rabbit	Nominated	

== See also ==
- List of British actors
