= Susannah Doyle =

English actress, playwright and film director

- Born: 5 July 1966 (age 60); Kingston-on-Thames, Surrey, England
- Education: London Academy of Music and Dramatic Art
- Occupations: Actress, Playwright
- Years active: 1989—present
- Known for: Drop the Dead Donkey; The Revenge Files of Alistair Fury; Ballykissangel

Susannah Doyle (born 5 July 1966) is an English actress, notable for her roles as Joy Merryweather in Drop The Dead Donkey (1991–1998), and as Avril Burke in Ballykissangel (2001).

Her other credits include Scandal (1989), The Young Indiana Jones Chronicles (1993), A Touch of Frost (1997), Midsomer Murders, Don't Go Breaking My Heart (1999), About a Boy (2002), episode "The Fisher King" (2004), The Revenge Files of Alistair Fury (2008), "Shut Up and Dance", from Black Mirror (2016), Josh (2016), and The Last Vermeer (2020).

== Early life ==
The daughter of the Irish actor Tony Doyle, she realised that she wished to follow in his footsteps when, aged about five or six, she was taken to see him work, often in tiny theatres with audience and actors close together. She trained at the London Academy of Music and Dramatic Art. She is the niece of Doctor Who actor Nicholas Courtney.

== Career ==
Her big TV break came in 1991 with the role of Joy, the intelligent, acid-tongued secretary and foil to her corporate-speak boss, in the Channel 4 comedy Drop The Dead Donkey. Other TV roles followed, including Minder in 1994, two episodes of Soldier, Soldier in 1996 and A Touch of Frost in 1997.

When her father died in 2000, the producers of Ballykissangel asked whether she would join the cast. She had reservations over her ability to cope emotionally but took on the part of Avril Burke in 2001. In 2001, she also appeared in an episode of Cold Feet and one of Pie in the Sky. In 2004, she guest starred as Vanessa Stone in Midsomer Murders, episode "The Fisher King" (2004).

In 2008, she starred as Celia Fury in the CBBC television series The Revenge Files of Alistair Fury, which won the BAFTA for Best Children's Drama Award.

In 2010 she appeared in "Your Sudden Death Question", S4:E3 of Lewis. In 2012 she appeared in an episode of police comedy Vexed. In October 2013, she appeared in Sarah Rutherford's Adult Supervision at Park Theatre (London).

In 2016, she appeared in "Shut Up and Dance", an episode of the anthology series Black Mirror.

== Director ==
Doyle started as a film director in 2005, writing and directing the short film New Religion.

== Filmography ==
- Scandal (1989) ... Jackie
- Drop The Dead Donkey (1991–1998) ... Joy Merryweather
- The Young Indiana Jones Chronicles (1993) ... Maggie Lemass
- Don't Go Breaking My Heart (1999) ... Diane
- Ballykissangel (2001) ... Avril Burke
- About a Boy (2002) ... Bitter Ex-Girlfriend
- Midsomer Murders - The Fisher King (2004) ... Vanessa Stone
- The Revenge Files of Alistair Fury ... Celia Fury
- A Congregation of Ghosts (2009) .... Barbara Baxter
- Black Mirror: "Shut Up and Dance" (2016) .... Blackmailed Woman
- Josh (2016)
- The Last Vermeer (2020)... Johana
