= The Revenge Files of Alistair Fury =

British book and television series by Jamie Rix

- Starring: Jonathan Mason; Natalie Kemp; Carlton Dickinson; Susannah Doyle; Brendan Dempsey; Alex Smith; Luke Roskell
- Country of origin: United Kingdom
- Original language: English
- No. of series: 1
- No. of episodes: 13

Production
- Running time: 25 minutes

Original release
- Network: BBC One; CBBC Channel
- Release: 7 January – 31 March 2008

The Revenge Files of Alistair Fury is the name of a series of children's books, written by Jamie Rix, and of the TV series based on the books. The book series was originally entitled The War Diaries of Alistair Fury, but new releases of the books have been renamed to The Revenge Files in order to match the TV series' title.

== Books ==
There are six books in the series and each is also available in Audiobook format.

- Bugs on the Brain
- Dead Dad Dog
- The Kiss of Death
- Tough Turkey
- Summer Helliday
- Exam Fever

== TV series ==
The Revenge Files of Alistair Fury, airs on BBC One and the CBBC Channel. The Australian Broadcasting Corporation also aired it on ABC1. It follows 11-year-old Alistair Fury (Jonathan Mason) who starts a club called The Revengers, which he operates through his website. Through this club, he attempts to get his own back on his annoying family, and the programme charts his revenges against them, as well as others. His family consist of his mother Celia (Susannah Doyle), his father Sean (Brendan Dempsey), his older brother William (Carlton Dickinson) and eldest sibling Melanie (Natalie Kemp). Also appearing is Alistair's grandmother, Constance (Kate Binchy). He is assisted in his "Revenges" by two friends, Aaron Pryce and Ralph Ming (Alex Smith).

The opening title sequence is based on Bob Dylan's video for Subterranean Homesick Blues. Each opening title sequence has differences in it from the others.

1. Verucca-Venge! (7 January 2008)
2. Cooking with Pets (14 January 2008)
3. The Lord of the Fury's (21 January 2008)
4. I'm Not Scared (28 January 2008)
5. Technology Bytes (4 February 2008)
6. The Luck of the Irish (11 February 2008)
7. The Gutter Press (18 February 2008)
8. Haircut of Horrors (25 February 2008)
9. Crazy Like a Frog (3 March 2008)
10. Alice in the Middle (10 March 2008)
11. The M Factor (17 March 2008)
12. Family Fortunes (24 March 2008)
13. The Great Trainer Robbery (31 March 2008)

== Characters ==
Character and Actor	Notes
Alistair Fury (Jonathan Mason)	Alistair Fury, nicknamed Alice by his brother and sister, is an angry 11-year-old who is the leader of his club called the Revengers. He is named after his Uncle Alistair, one of a great line of unsuccessful Alistairs in the Fury family, even though he actually should have been named after his uncle Alec - a Revenger, like Alistair.
Melanie Fury (Natalie Kemp)	Melanie "Mel" Fury is the eldest of the Fury children, who always seems to be finding new boyfriends.
William Fury (Carlton Dickinson)	William "Will" Fury is the middle child. He bullies Alistair along with his sister, and is the family's Number One Son. He loves rugby and hockey.
Celia Fury (Susannah Doyle)	Celia Fury is the ignorant mother of Alistair Fury. She is a famous TV chef and she likes to be the rival of Nigella Lawson. She always tries to cook weird food such as toejam and bogie and vomit. She thinks she is a great cook but really she is not.
Sean Fury	Sean Fury is the ignorant father. He tries to find excuses to skive off work at any opportunity, and favors William.
Constance Fury (Kate Binchy	Constance "Granny" Fury is the grandmother of the Fury family who takes pride in the Fury family's Irish ancestry.
Great Uncle Crawford	Great Uncle Crawford is the family's great uncle. He owned a parrot who died, but he seems to like Alistair more than Mel and Will because he helped Alistair revenge them by showing them his parrot's twin. The older brother and sister thought that it was a ghost.
Wayne Fury (Rubie Roddick-Doyle)	Wayne "Baby Waynie" is the family's baby. He is a cousin of Alistair's, Mary, who is a rubbish mum. He was scared of his Auntie Celie when she showed him jellyfish. Alistair used Wayne as an experiment 'an experiment involving love and hormones' to see if Mel was pregnant.
Mary Fury	Mary Fury is a teenage mum and Alistair's cousin. Alistair calls her the world's worst mum because she doesn't care about Wayne.
Ralph Ming (Alex Smith)	Ralph is Alistair's right-hand man. He is also a Revenger. He is second in command in the revengers before the poor pudgy and misguided Aaron Pryce. His father is the vicar of Notfairleigh. He's very intelligent and tries to help Alistair lead the Revengers.
Reverend Ming ( Michael Fenton Stevens)	Reverend Ming is the vicar of Notfairleigh. He organised Ralph's party and pretended to be a hypnotist.
Miss Bird (Suzy Aitchison)	Miss Bird is the evil teacher of Alistair. She despises him but loves Will and Mel (her formal pupils). She blows up non-school uniform (like Alistair's new and expensive Robbin' Hood trainers) and loves Brad Pitt. As a revenge, Alistair put her in the SAS. Alistair once hypnotised her into diving out of a window and breaking several limbs.
Mrs Mutley (Vicky Hall)	Mutley is the music teacher of Notfairleigh School. She runs The M Factor (a talent show based on The X Factor). She is warty and has an abominable operatic voice. She teaches Alistair the piano and loves him thinking he is the next Mozart because he is quite good at piano.
Mr Lambejo	A Nigerian teacher who is slightly in love with Miss Bird. He went into the toilet and thought she was currified
Sanjay Chatterji (Thammar Nazir)	A chocoholic who is an assistant of the Revengers. He helps out in the local newsagents. He does disgusting things with his shoulder in Mrs. Mutley's M Factor and wins a trip to 'The Burger Bin'.
Misri Chatterji (Adham Nazir)	An excellent pianist who doesn't like his brother but is an assistant of the Revengers. He helps out in the local newsagents.
Mr Chatterji	A scary man who haunted Alistair in his nightmares but he really is a big baby.
Aaron Pryce (Luke Roskell	Aaron is the least intelligent of the Revengers. He is the one in the group that the fellow revengers take pity on. He relies on his mum but still is a great friend of Alistair. Alistair's Mum once hired him to be a hungry homeless boy on her show and calls him 'Arry'.
Pamela Whitby (Rhona McFarlane)	The daughter of Dr Whitby and the love of Alistair's life. She was temporarily his fiancée after the boy proposed to her. Her father once made Alistair stay over 100 yards away from her.
Chelsea	A girl who won the Fury ring in a raffle meaning that she was Alistair's fiancée.
Dr Tara Lyer (Cathy Murphy)	"Dr" Tara is a hypocritical child expert who knows nothing about children. She appeared on the TV show Not Quite the Expert alongside Celia Fury. She doesn't like Alistair and was the love of Will's life. Her mother was Bunty, and is practically married to her car whom she calls Bunty. She wrote a book (a pile of nonsense) called Raising Kids the Doctor Tara Way.

== Awards ==
In 2008 The Revenge Files of Alistair Fury won a BAFTA Children's Drama Award.
