= Lassie (2005 film) =

2005 film by Charles Sturridge

- UK theatrical release poster
- Directed by: Charles Sturridge
- Written by: Charles Sturridge; Eric Knight
- Based on: Lassie Come-Home by Eric Knight
- Produced by: Charles Sturridge; Ed Guiney; Francesca Barra
- Starring: Jonathan Mason; Peter O'Toole; Samantha Morton; John Lynch; Peter Dinklage; Edward Fox
- Cinematography: Howard Atherton
- Edited by: Peter Coulson; Adam Green
- Music by: Adrian Johnston
- Production companies: Samuel Goldwyn Films; Odyssey Entertainment; Classic Media; Firstsight Films; Davis Films; Isle of Man Film
- Distributed by: Entertainment Film Distributors (United Kingdom); Roadside Attractions; IDP Distribution (United States); Metropolitan Filmexport (France)
- Release date: December 16, 2005
- Running time: 100 minutes
- Countries: United Kingdom; United States; France; Ireland
- Language: English
- Budget: $20 million
- Box office: $6.4 million

Lassie is a 2005 adventure comedy-drama film based on Eric Knight's 1940 novel Lassie Come-Home about the profound bond between Joe Carraclough and his Rough Collie, Lassie. The film was directed, written, and co-produced by Charles Sturridge and is a production of Samuel Goldwyn Films. The film stars Jonathan Mason and was distributed by Roadside Attractions and released in the UK on 16 December 2005. Filming took place in Scotland, Ireland and the Isle of Man. The supporting cast features Peter O'Toole, Samantha Morton, Peter Dinklage, Edward Fox, and John Lynch. The film was generally reviewed positively by critics, but performed poorly at the box office.

== Plot ==
Sam Carraclough, an out-of-work miner who struggles to earn enough to feed his family, reluctantly sells their Collie dog, Lassie, to the Duke of Rudling, whose granddaughter, Cilla, sees and likes her. Sam's young son, Joe, is left heartbroken. The Duke's servant, Hynes, scares Lassie, who keeps escaping and coming back to the Carracloughs who have to keep returning her, and Hynes blames the boy for Lassie's departures.

For Christmas, the duke goes to the Scottish Highlands, taking Lassie with him. Lassie escapes once again, with Cilla's help, after Hynes beats the dog, for which the duke fires him, and makes the 500-mile journey back to Yorkshire. Meanwhile, Sam enlists in World War II to support his family. During her journey, Lassie climbs mountains, swims a river, passes Loch Ness, dodges municipal dog catchers and is taken in by a kindly puppeteer and circus performer (Peter Dinklage) and befriends his small dog, Toots. Later, they are attacked by men who kill the small dog and the angered performer and Lassie chase the men away. Lassie parts with her new friend and reaches home on Christmas Day but collapses outside the church in which the family is in. When mass is over, the family's other dog help them find Lassie, exhausted, ill and nearly dead, and take her home. The veterinarian tells the family that Lassie might not survive. When Hynes, living in the village, sees that Lassie has been found, he, accompanied by police officers, goes to the house to seize Lassie and take her to the Duke's local estate. The family is forced to accompany her. The duke, recognizing Lassie, instead lets the family keep her by denying that it is the same dog and evicts Hynes from his premises for good. After Lassie recovers, the duke offers Hynes' old job and tied house to Sam and his family. Cilla sees that her crusty grandfather has a soft side and visits the family to see Lassie's new puppies. Joe and Cilla play with Lassie and her puppies as the movie ends.

== Cast ==
- Jonathan Mason as Joe Carraclough
- Peter O'Toole as The Duke of Rudling
- Samantha Morton as Sarah Carraclough
- John Lynch as Sam Carraclough
- Steve Pemberton as Hynes
- Hester Odgers as Cilla
- Jemma Redgrave as Daisy
- Peter Dinklage as Rowlie
- Edward Fox as Colonel Hulton
- Gregor Fisher as Mapes
- Angela Thorne as Dr. Gull
- Kelly Macdonald as Jeanie
- Nicholas Lyndhurst as Buckle
- Dermot Ward as Court Usher
- Mason (uncredited) as Lassie
- DR Dakota (uncredited) as action Lassie

== Production ==
In January 2004, it was announced Classic Media (now DreamWorks Classics) would be producing a new Lassie film to be written and directed by Charles Sturridge and based on the 1940 novel Lassie Come-Home. Production on the film began in February 2005 on a $20 million budget which was covered by foreign presales.

This is the eleventh movie about Lassie, according to the producers. It is based on Eric Knight's 1940 novel Lassie Come-Home. Filming took place in Scotland, Ireland and on the Isle of Man.

== Music ==
The film was composed by Adrian Johnston. The theme song for the Japanese version is called "Singing" by Kaori Kishitani.

== Reception ==
=== Box office ===
The film earned $6,442,854 worldwide.

=== Critical response ===
On the review aggregator website Rotten Tomatoes, 93% of 70 critics' reviews are positive, with an average rating of 7.3/10. The website's consensus reads: "A beautifully-made retelling of the classic collie tale, one need not be a dog-lover to fall for Lassie." Metacritic, which uses a weighted average, assigned the film a score of 84 out of 100, based on 15 critics, indicating "universal acclaim".

A New York Times reviewer said the film "balances cruelty and tenderness, pathos and humor without ever losing sight of its youngest audience member" and also exclaimed, "This 'Lassie' exhibits a repertory of facial expressions that would put Jim Carrey to shame". Empire's Anna Smith wrote, "Thanks to a relatively gritty setting and an estimable adult cast, this sentimental story is rendered bearable for adults and children alike." BBC's Neil Smith said, "The combination of everyone's favourite canine and eye-catching Irish and Isle of Man locations ensure this nostalgic shaggy-dog story sends you home with your tail wagging."

== Awards ==
=== Broadcast Film Critics Association Awards 2007 ===
| Award | Category | Nominee |
|---|---|---|
| Critics Choice Award | Best Family Film (Live Action) | Nominated |

=== Irish Film and Television Awards 2007 ===
| Award | Category | Nominee | Result |
|---|---|---|---|
| IFTA Award | Best Sound in Film/TV Drama | Peter Blayney, Patrick Drummond, John Fitzgerald and Mervyn Moore | Won |

=== Audience Award ===
| Award | Category | Nominee |
|---|---|---|
| Audience Award | Best Irish Film | Nominated |

=== Women Film Critics Circle Awards 2006 ===
| Award | Category | Nominee |
|---|---|---|
| WFCC Award | Best Family Film | Won |

=== Young Artist Awards 2007 ===
| Award | Category | Nominee | Result |
|---|---|---|---|
| Young Artist Award | Best Performance in an International Feature Film and Best International Family Feature Film - Leading Young Actor or Actress | Jonathan Mason | Nominated |

== Video game ==
A video game based on the film was released for the PlayStation 2 in 2007, it was developed by EM Studios and published by Mastertronic.
