= Carnage (2017 film) =

- Directed by: Simon Amstell
- Written by: Simon Amstell
- Produced by: Daniel O'Connor
- Starring: Martin Freeman; Joanna Lumley; Eileen Atkins; Lindsay Duncan; Alex Lawther; Gemma Jones; Linda Bassett; Mawaan Rizwan; John Macmillan; Kirsty Wark; Jme; Lorraine Kelly; Vanessa Feltz
- Edited by: Leigh Brzeski
- Music by: Jeremy Warmsley
- Distributed by: BBC
- Release date: 19 March 2017
- Running time: 65 minutes
- Country: United Kingdom
- Language: English

Carnage (also known as Carnage: Swallowing the Past) is a 2017 semi-mockumentary, semi-documentary hybrid film directed by British comedian Simon Amstell. Set in the year 2067, when veganism is the norm, the film looks back on the history of meat-eating and carnism today. It premiered on BBC iPlayer.

== Plot ==
Set in 2067, the narrator tells how the world is a happier place, as meat eating ("carnism") is banned and veganism prevails. Young people express their disbelief on how people could have ever killed and eaten animals. Yasmine Vondenburgen, a psychotherapist, holds support sessions for former carnists to lift the guilt of carnism. In one session, Davina breaks down after naming Edam as a cheese she once ate.

The film goes back to 1944, to the establishment of The Vegan Society, and rationing of meat due to war, which ends in 1954. Fanny Cradock promotes carnism in theatre and TV. In the 1970s and 1980s, US food companies disguise meat as toys children would like to eat, using figures like Ronald McDonald to attract them. Intensive farming leads to BSE crisis and foot-and-mouth disease. From 2004, many diseases grow due to consumption of processed meats.

The film then returns to 2067, with young people using new VR technology to experience eating meat. They stop after a while, unable to process it.

Going back to 2017, the film shows how celebrity chefs like Nigella Lawson, Gordon Ramsay, Jamie Oliver and Hugh Fearnley-Whittingstall promote carnism instead of veganism. It shows the rise in veganism, helped by people like JME, who inspires Troye King Jones. King Jones then writes a book and makes feature films on veganism. Maude Polikoff, former erotic dancer, reveals she left the career as milk and dairy were used in a sexualised way, in spite of being unethically obtained. Vondenburgen explains how the hierarchy of the British monarchy led to humans believing they should be above animals. The UN urges people to cut down on meat, due to climate change. This is ignored, and the UK faces floods. Lindsay Graber, a victim of these, explains climate change due to meat on TV. Veganism is promoted by TV presenters, but it is ignored, and in 2021 the UK faces a Super Swine Flu, killing many. Intensive farming is banned to prevent a re-occurrence, but this hikes up costs of meat, and many people are confused over what to eat.

In 2023, this Era of Confusion is broken by a new celebrity chef Freddy Jayashankar, who re-introduces a plant based Eastern cuisine. It is revealed that King Jones and Jayashankar are in a relationship. Later, a film, Dorothy is Still Dorothy, is broadcast by the BBC featuring Dorothy, a woman with Alzheimer's who forgets that eating a chicken is normal, much to the annoyance of her son Jeff. In 2024, a musical featuring Amelie dressed as a cow is made, which exposes the horrors of the dairy industry. Albania wins the Eurovision Song Contest by a vegan song.

Meanwhile, Graham Watkins speaks out against veganism, harassing vegans on streets and in restaurants. A TV show, Mike's Meat House, mocking veganism is started, but cancelled after four episodes. Graber returns to TV to explain harsh environmental effects of beef, and suggesting a ban on it, which is not accepted by the British, leading to riots. King Jones appears for an interview on Newsnight. Shortly after that, he is murdered and cannibalised, allegedly by a member of the Great British Meat League. This sparks a revolution, with major food companies including McDonald's and KFC turning vegan, and 75% of UK at least vegetarian; yet there is a reluctance for criminalising carnism. Watkins, with other carnists, states illogical reasons defending carnism.

All such arguments are resolved by the invention of a Thought Translator, allowing animals to communicate freely with humans using the recorded voice of Joanna Lumley. The unethical practices of the egg industry are explained. In 2035, the Bill of Animal Rights is finally passed, criminalising carnism. The animals who were victims of the industry are sent to recovery centres. Coming back to 2067, the Clifton Abattoir is now a museum to explain the horrific dairy industry of the past. The young and old apologise to each other.

The film ends with the support group successfully naming the fish they had once eaten.

== Cast ==
- Simon Amstell as Narrator
- Linda Bassett as Yasmine Vondenburgen
- Gemma Jones as Davina
- JME as Himself
- John Macmillan as Troye King Jones
- Lindsay Duncan as Maude Polikoff
- Claire Keelan as Lindsay Graber
- Lorraine Kelly as Herself
- Mawaan Rizwan as Freddy Jayashankar
- Eileen Atkins as Dorothy
- Martin Freeman as Jeff
- Samantha Spiro as Amelie/Edith Paper, actress in dairy musical
- James Smith as Graham Watkins
- Alex Lawther as Joseph, a teenager
- Joanna Lumley (voice) as Herself
- Kirsty Wark as Herself
- Vanessa Feltz as Herself
- Christian Fraser as Himself
- Clive Myrie as Himself

== Reception ==
Writing in the Independent, Max Benwell described the film as 'the world's first vegan comedy that's actually funny'.

== See also ==
- List of vegan and plant-based media
