= Beautiful Faces =

Single by Declan McKenna

from the album Zeros
- Released: 29 January 2020
- Genre: Indie rock
- Length: 3:16
- Label: Columbia Records
- Songwriters: Declan McKenna; Max Marlow
- Producer: Jay Joyce

Declan McKenna singles chronology
"Brew (Regurgitated)" (2019)	"Beautiful Faces" (2020)	"The Key to Life on Earth" (2020)

"Beautiful Faces" is a song by English singer, songwriter, and musician Declan McKenna. It was released as the lead single from his second studio album, Zeros, on 29 January 2020. The song was written by McKenna and Max Marlow.

== Live performances ==
On 5 April 2020, Declan McKenna performed the song live on Sunday Brunch. He performed the song from his home, saying that the COVID-19 pandemic made it impossible for his band to join him: "Unfortunately because of social distancing I can't have my band here with me today so I've got these guys in to help." In the background, four more McKennas were sat around the room, taking on the roles of his backing band.

== Background ==
Speaking about the song, McKenna said, "I wanted it to be a big song...Scary big. It very much relates to now, but I wanted to reimagine social media in this future-sphere where it has become even more immersive so that we cannot see where it ends and we begin."

== Music video ==
A music video to accompany the release of "Beautiful Faces" was released to YouTube on 29 January 2020.

== Track listing ==
Digital download and stream
No.	Title	Length
1.	"Beautiful Faces"	3:16

Digital download – Skream Remix
No.	Title	Length
1.	"Beautiful Faces" (Skream Remix)	3:56

== Personnel ==
Credits adapted from Tidal.

- Jay Joyce – producer
- Declan McKenna – composer, lyricist, associated performer, guitar, vocal
- Max Marlow – composer, lyricist
- Court Blankenship – assistant engineer
- Jimmy Mansfield – assistant engineer
- Gabrielle King – background vocal, drums
- Isabel Torres – background vocal, guitar
- Nathaniel Cox – background vocal, bass, synthesizer
- Jason Hall – engineer
- Matt Wolach – engineer
- Michael Freeman – engineer
- Matt Colton – mastering engineer
- Mark 'Spike' Stent – mixing engineer

== Charts ==
Chart (2020)	Peak position
US Adult Alternative Airplay (Billboard)	22
US Alternative Airplay (Billboard)	24
US Rock & Alternative Airplay (Billboard)	38

== Release history ==
Region	Date	Format	Label
Various	29 January 2020	Digital download; streaming	Columbia Records
