= Jonathan Mason (actor) =

British actor

- Born: 22 March 1996 (age 30); Bradford, Yorkshire, England
- Occupation: Actor
- Years active: 2004–2009

Jonathan Mason (born 22 March 1996) is an English actor. He is known for playing the lead role of the 2005 version of Lassie.

He is most notable for the part of Joe Carraclough in Lassie and as the roles of James, in Nits and Alistair Fury on The Revenge Files of Alistair Fury.

He also had a minor role in Vincent in 2006. Jonathan studied at Notre Dame Catholic Sixth Form College in Leeds. Jonathan studied Politics at Sheffield Hallam University in Sheffield. Mason also had a role in The Race as Mary Kensay's best friend.

== Filmography ==
Year	Film	Role	Notes
2005	Lassie	Joe Carraclough	
2008	The Revenge Files of Alistair Fury	Alistair Fury	Lead role
2009	The Race	Tom	
