= Silas K. Hocking =

British writer, preacher, journalist

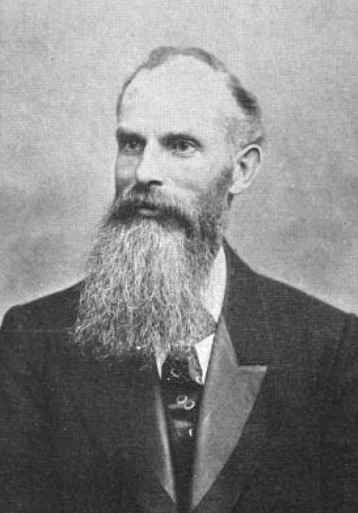
In The Sketch, 16 September 1896

Silas Kitto Hocking (24 March 1850 – 15 September 1935) was a Cornish novelist and Methodist preacher. He is known for his novel for youth called Her Benny (1879), which was a best-seller.

== Biography ==
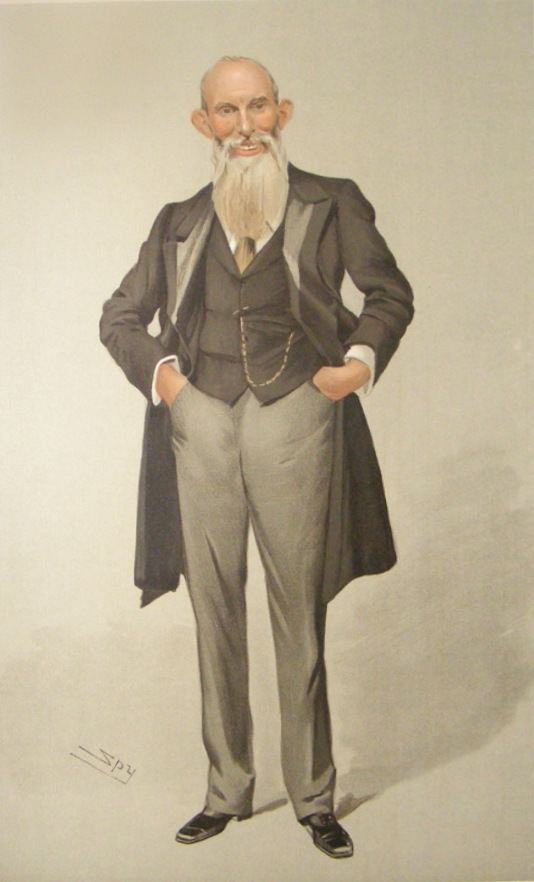
Carricature of Hocking from Vanity Fair, issue dated 14 November 1906

Hocking was born at St Stephen-in-Brannel, Cornwall, to James Hocking, part owner of a tin mine, and his wife Elizabeth, née Kitto. His brother was Joseph Hocking (1860–1937), also a novelist and Methodist minister, and his sister, Salome Hocking (1859–1927), who was also a novelist. As a youngster he read Sir Walter Scott. Although intended to follow his father into the tin business, he felt called to the Methodist ministry. He attended Owens College and the Crescent Range Theological College of Manchester. In 1870 he was ordained as a minister. He worked in different parts of England over the next few years, showing himself to be a brilliant preacher, and he married in 1876. He resigned in 1896 to devote his time to writing, Liberal politics and journalism.

Hocking wrote many novels aimed at children with a didactic bent. He wrote his first novel, Alec Green, while living in Burnley in 1878. It was, however, with his second novel that he won great fame; Her Benny (1879), a story of the street children of Liverpool. It sold over a million copies and with it Hocking become one of the most popular authors in England. The novel was adapted to silent film in 1920 as Her Benny.

In 1894 Hocking became editor of Family Circle and two years later helped establish Temple Magazine, a Sunday magazine in the style of Good Words. His novel The Strange Adventures of Israel Pendry (1899) is autobiographical of his Cornish youth. Other works include God's Outcast (1898) which reflects on the nature of guilt; and, To Pay the Price (1900), a morality story of theft and redemption. His autobiography My Book of Memory was published in 1923. In all he wrote fifty books.

Hocking was also politically active, for the Liberal party and unsuccessfully contested the January 1906 General Election at Aylesbury and January 1910 General Election at Coventry. He died in Highgate, Middlesex, and was survived by his wife, Esther Mary, to whom he had been married since 1876. They had two sons and two daughters. Silas Hocking is buried in St Pancras and Islington Cemetery, along with his son, who died of Spanish flu in 1919, and his wife.

== Bibliography ==
- Alec Green (1878)
- Her Benny (1879)
- His Father (1880)
- Reedyford (1880)
- Chips: A Story of Manchester Life (1881)
- Ivy (1881)
- Poor Mike (1882)
- Sea Waif (1882)
- Dick’s Fairy (1883)
- Caleb Carthew (1884)
- Cricket: A Tale of Humble Life (1885)
- Our Joe (1885)
- Tregeagles Head (1886)
- Up the Rhine and Over the Alps (1886)
- Real Grit (1887)
- Crookleigh (1888)
- For Abigail (1889)
- ’Chips’, ‘Joe’ and ‘Mike’ (1890)
- For Light and Liberty (1890)
- Rex Raynor (1890)
- Where Duty Lies (1891)
- One in Charity (1893)
- A Son of Reuben (1894)
- Sweethearts Yet (1894)
- The Blindness of Madge Tyndall (1894)
- Doctor Dick and Other Tales (1895)
- The Heart of Man (1895)
- For Such is Life (1896)
- In Spite of Fate (1897)
- God’s Outcast (1898)
- Tales of a Tin Mine (1898)
- The Culture of Manhood (1898)
- The Day of Recompense (1899)
- The Strange Adventures of Israel Pendray (1899)
- The Fate of Endilloe (1901)
- To Pay the Price (1900)
- When Life is Young (1900)
- The Awakening of Anthony Weir (1901)
- Gripped (1902)
- The Wizard’s Light (1902)
- Adventures of Latimer Field, Curate (1903)
- A Bonnie Saxon (1903)
- The Tempter’s Power (1903)
- The Scarlet Clue (1904 (2nd edn))
- Smoking Flax (1904)
- Meadowsweet and Rue (1904)
- Chapters in Democratic Christianity (1904)
- Pioneers (1905)
- The Conquering Will (1905)
- The Earnest Life (1905)
- The Flaming Sword (1905)
- A Gamble with Life (1906)
- A Human Face (1906)
- The Silent Man (1906)
- The Squire’s Daughter (1906)
- A Modern Pharisee (1907)
- St Gwynifer (1907)
- The Shadow Between (1908)
- Yours and Mine (1908)
- A Desperate Hope (1909)
- Who Shall Judge? (1910)
- The Quenchless Fire (1911)
- The Third Man (1911)
- Smuggler’s Keep (1913)
- A Woman’s Love (1913)
- The Wrath of Man (1913)
- In Self-Defence (1914)
- Sword and Cross (1914)
- Uncle Peter’s Will (1914)
- The Angel of the Desert (1915)
- The Great Hazard (1915)
- When He Came to Himself (1915)
- The Beautiful Alien (1916)
- A Man’s Work (1916)
- His Own Accuser (1917)
- Camouflage (1918)
- The Moral Aspect of the League of Nations (n.d. – 1918?)
- Nancy (1919)
- Without the Gate (1919)
- Watchers in the Dawn (1920)
- An Interrupted Romance (1921)
- The Greater Good (1922)
- Where the Roads Cross (1922)
- The Lost Lode (1923)
- My Book of Memory (1923)
- The Guarded Way (1924)
- The Crooked Trail (1925)
- Lonehead Farm (1925)
- The Sinister Shadow (1926)
- Miss Ann’s Lodger (1927)
- The Broken Fence (1928)
- The Winds of Chance (1928)
- The Exile’s Return (1929)
- The Mystery Man (1930)
- The Perplexities of Peter (1933)
- Gerry Storm (1934)
