= Her Benny (novel) =

1879 serial novel by Silas K. Hocking

Her Benny. A Story of Street Life.
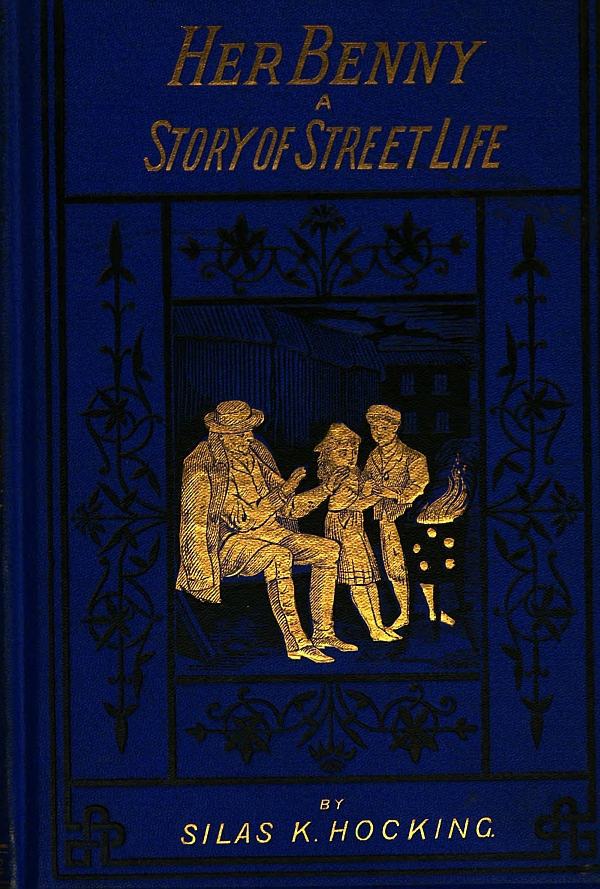
- Cover of the 1879 hardback edition
- Author: Silas Hocking
- Illustrator: Harry Tuck
- Language: English
- Publisher: Frederick Warne & Co.
- Publication date: 1879
- Publication place: United Kingdom
- OCLC: 59978485
- Text: Her Benny. A Story of Street Life. at Project Gutenberg

Her Benny, an improving story for young people about Liverpool street children, was first published in 1879. It was the best-known and most popular work of Methodist minister and author Silas Hocking.

Published initially as a serial, and then in book form by Frederick Warne & Co. of London as Her Benny. A Story of Street Life, 1879, with illustrations by Harry Tuck. Hocking, who had published one previous novel (Alec Green, 1878), sold the copyright of this one for just £20, but it was to establish his reputation. It became hugely successful, was translated into many languages, and sold over a million copies in the author's lifetime.

== Plot ==
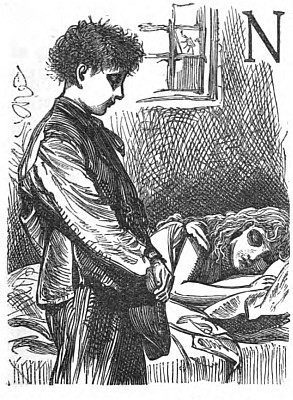
One of Tuck's illustrations, for chapter 3, showing Benny and Nelly

Benny Bates, a poor boy from the Liverpool slums, is ten years old when the story begins. He scrapes a living running errands in the streets; his beloved but frail sister Nelly, a year younger, sells matches. Their mother is dead, their father a drink-sodden brute, who dies later on in the story, becomes violent towards Nelly and the two children run away from home. Helped by their friend the night-watchman Joe Wrag, and 'Granny' Betty Barker, manage to retain their independence and learn to lead Christian lives. Nelly, a child of great natural spiritual insight, acts as Benny's moral conscience; when she dies after a street accident, he is in despair. A lucky encounter with Eva Lawrence, the little girl he will come to call his 'angel', leads to a job as office-boy to her father, a rich Liverpool businessman. Benny works hard, hoping to educate and better himself, but loses both job and reputation when Mr. Lawrence wrongly accuses him of stealing a five-pound note. Abandoning Liverpool, he nearly dies of starvation and heat-stroke, but is rescued and nursed back to health by a kindly farming family. He remains with them, working on the farm and studying in night school. Six years later, and by now grown up, he bravely stops a runaway carriage in a nearby lane; only afterwards does he discover that one of its occupants was Eva Lawrence. Benny has saved his 'angel's' life; now she reveals that she and her father have long known that he was innocent of the theft. The grateful Mr. Lawrence offers Benny a new job, this time as his clerk; he returns to Liverpool, to work his way up into partnership with Mr. Lawrence, and marriage with Eva, who gave him the shilling in his greatest hour of need, which he kept and never dared spend.

== Analysis ==
Her Benny was amongst the most popular examples of the 'waif story', a category of improving fiction for Victorian children whose purpose, although primarily religious (and typically Evangelical), was also social and political. As Hocking describes in his preface, Her Benny grew out of his Methodist ministry:

my pastoral work, during a three years' residence in Liverpool, called me frequently into some of the poorest neighbourhoods of that town, where I became acquainted with some of the originals of this story ... the grouping of the characters is purely fictitious, but not the characters themselves.... Some of them are alive today, others have gone to their rest.... [If my story] shall awaken any sympathy for the poor little waifs of our streets, I shall have my reward.

His local knowledge also emerges in the book's vivid descriptions of Victorian Liverpool, and its careful attempts to reproduce the Scouse dialect.

Didactic in intent, yet sympathetic in tone, his 'rags to riches' tale was well calculated to appeal to a contemporary audience. Its form parallels, and was probably influenced by, Hogarth's well-known and widely distributed series of engravings of Industry and Idleness, which had also been aimed at the young. Like them, its principal message is that diligence and honesty will be rewarded; Benny as Industrious Apprentice has his Idle counterpart too, in the character of Perks, a street boy who repeatedly but unsuccessfully attempts to lure Benny into crime, and ends up dying in Dartmoor prison.

Hocking's work however is also characteristic of Victorian evangelical fiction in the emphasis placed on Christian piety, and the role of inner spiritual renewal; his Methodist beliefs emerge especially clearly in Joe Wrag's prolonged struggle with the doctrine of Predestination. Hocking's sense of pathos is also characteristically Victorian; in particular the name chosen for Benny's little sister, as well as her character and fate, seem calculated to recall to his readership Little Nell in Dickens's 1840/1841 novel The Old Curiosity Shop, who was also marked for a tragically early grave.

== Adaptations ==
A British silent film version of Her Benny was produced in 1920. In 1993 the novel was also adapted into a successful stage musical by Anne Dalton, with a 25th anniversary revival in 2018. An original cast recording was issued on CD on the 'Dress Circle' label in 1993.
