= Zeros (Declan McKenna album) =

Studio album by Declan McKenna
- Released: 4 September 2020
- Recorded: August 2019
- Genre: Indie rock; glam rock
- Length: 40:26
- Label: Columbia
- Producer: Jay Joyce

Declan McKenna chronology
Regurgitated (2019)	Zeros (2020)	What Happened to the Beach? (2024)

Singles from Zeros
- 1. "Beautiful Faces" Released: 29 January 2020; 2. "The Key to Life on Earth" Released: 14 April 2020; 3. "Daniel, You’re Still a Child" Released: 8 July 2020; 4. "Be an Astronaut" Released: 5 August 2020; 5. "Rapture"

Professional ratings
Aggregate scores
Source	Rating
Metacritic	81/100
Review scores
Source	Rating
Clash	8/10
DIY	4/5 stars
The Guardian	4/5 stars
The Independent	4/5 stars
musicOMH	4/5 stars
NME	4/5 stars
Pitchfork	7.3/10
Q	4/5 stars

Zeros is the second studio album by the English singer, songwriter and musician Declan McKenna. It was released on 4 September 2020 by Columbia Records after multiple delays. The album includes the singles "Beautiful Faces", "The Key to Life on Earth", "Daniel, You're Still a Child", and "Be an Astronaut". The album was released to commercial success and universal acclaim from critics, who praised its songwriting, production, and contemporary take on the rock music style of the 1960s and 1970s.

== Background ==
In January 2020, McKenna announced that his new album would be released on 15 May 2020. In an interview with DIY (when asked about what the album will sound like), he said, "I've been listening to a lot of old Dylan records, these really raw recordings, and really appreciating that energy. I just wanted to get in a room with a group of musicians and not get it too 'right'. The sound to me developed in that way. There's a lot of '70s references, a lot of Waterboys and Crosby, Stills and Nash, but it still feels modern to me. It definitely feels like a natural progression from the first one." In March 2020, he announced that he was delaying the release of the album due to the COVID-19 pandemic and that it would now be released on 21 August. McKenna said on his social media, "This is not a decision I take lightly – I recorded this album in August last year, and for it to have taken a whole year to get out to the world is pretty jarring for me, but these times are exceptional and there is very little space to make this happen the way I want it to within them." In August 2020, McKenna announced that he would further delay the album's release to 4 September 2020.

== Promotion ==
=== Singles ===
"Beautiful Faces" was released as the lead single from the album on 29 January 2020. The song peaked at number 24 on the US Billboard Alternative Songs chart. "The Key to Life on Earth" was released as the second single from the album on 14 April 2020. "Daniel, You’re Still a Child" was released as the third single from the album on 8 July 2020. "Be an Astronaut" was released as the fourth single on 5 August 2020, followed by a music video on 7 August 2020.

=== Tour ===
McKenna confirmed that planned April tour dates will be rescheduled. He said, "I am going to be playing more shows later in the year and beyond so I can still see all those who had tickets and all who did not but in these uncertain times it’s going to take a second to know when works. Touring at the minute is not only unsafe but effectively impossible, plans we had in the coming months for America, Europe and many of our festival dates are now not going to happen in the lead up to the album."

== Commercial performance ==
Despite pushing back the release of the album to a less competitive week and a public campaign by McKenna on social media to get the album to No. 1, the album debuted at the runner-up position on both the UK and Scottish album charts, 800 sales behind The Rolling Stones' reissue of their 1973 album Goats Head Soup This marked McKenna's first top 10 on both charts. By its second week on the UK chart, it had dropped to number 40. It also reached the top 10 on Ireland, opening at number 9 as that week's highest debut, before falling from the top 50 the subsequent week.

== Track listing ==
All tracks are written by Declan McKenna, except where noted.

Zeros track listing
No.	Title	Writer(s)	Length
1.	"You Better Believe!!!"	McKenna; Jake Passmore	4:53
2.	"Be an Astronaut"		4:35
3.	"The Key to Life on Earth"	McKenna; Max Marlow	4:06
4.	"Beautiful Faces"	McKenna; Marlow	3:16
5.	"Daniel, You're Still a Child"	McKenna; Marlow	3:58
6.	"Emily"		4:12
7.	"Twice Your Size"	McKenna; Marlow	3:19
8.	"Rapture"		3:59
9.	"Sagittarius A*"		3:57
10.	"Eventually, Darling"		4:11
Total length:			40:26

Japanese edition bonus tracks
No.	Title	Length
11.	"Who Do I Think I Am" (Demo)	3:18
12.	"Colour Collider" (Demo)	4:31
Total length:		48:26

== Personnel ==
Credits adapted from Tidal.

- Declan McKenna - Vocals, acoustic and electric guitar, bass, synth, piano, snare, vocoder, mellotron, organ, omnichord
- Gabrielle King - Drums, backing vocals
- Isabel Torres - Guitar, backing vocals
- Nathan Cox - Synth, bass, xylophone, backing vocals
- Soren Bryce, Violin, cello
- Jay Joyce – Production
- Matt Colton – Mastering
- Mark "Spike" Stent – Mixing, Recording

== Charts ==
Chart performance for Zeros
Chart (2020)	Peak position
Irish Albums (OCC)	9
Scottish Albums (OCC)	2
UK Albums (OCC)	2
US Heatseekers Albums (Billboard)	9

== Release history ==
Release formats for Zeros
Region	Date	Format	Label
United Kingdom	4 September 2020	Digital download; streaming	Columbia
