= List of suicides (2000–present) =

The following notable people have died by suicide since 2000. This includes suicides effected under duress and excludes deaths by accident or misadventure. People who may or may not have died by their own hand, whose intent to die is disputed, or who are alleged to have been killed, may be listed.

== Confirmed ==
=== A ===
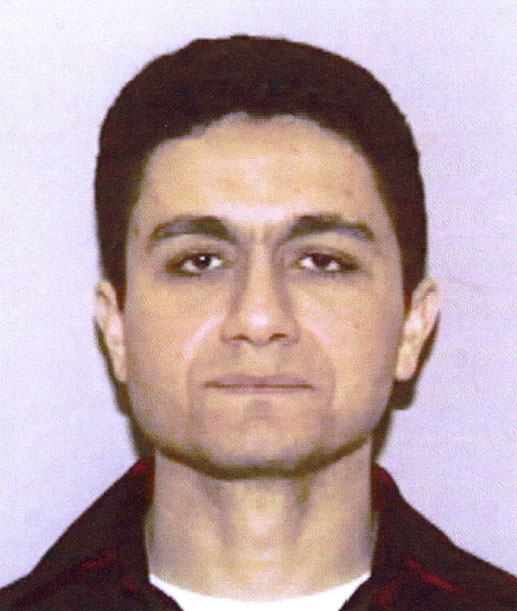
Mohamed Atta

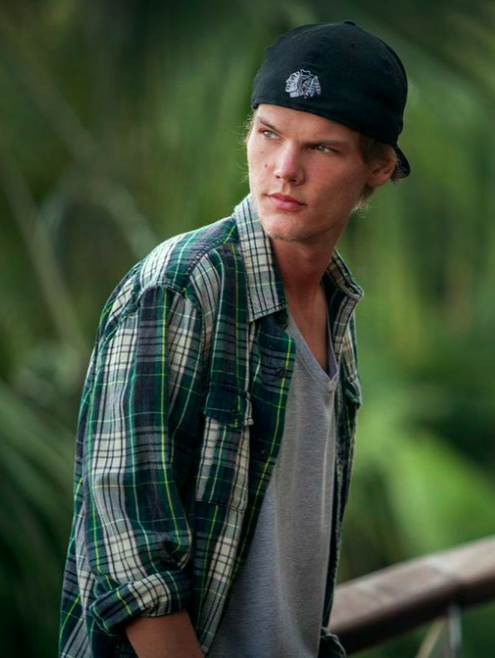
Avicii

- Carole Achache (2016), French writer, photographer and actress, hanging
- Phillip Adams (2021), American football player, gunshot
- Stephanie Adams (2018), American former glamour model, known as the November 1992 Playboy Playmate, jumped from a 25th floor window after having murdered her 7-year-old son Vincent by pushing him out first
- Stuart Adamson (2001), Scottish guitarist and singer for Big Country and Skids, hanging after alcohol ingestion
- Ahn Jae-hwan (2008), South Korean actor, carbon monoxide poisoning
- Chantal Akerman (2015), Belgian film director
- Marwan al-Shehhi (2001), United Arab Emirates member of Al-Qaeda and one of the 9/11 hijackers, plane crash of United Airlines Flight 175
- Leelah Alcorn (2014), American transgender teenager, walked in front of a truck
- Ekaterina Alexandrovskaya (2020), Russian-Australian ice skater, jumped from window of her apartment
- Gia Allemand (2013), American actress and model, hanging
- August Ames (2017), Canadian pornographic actress, hanging
- Gonçalo Amorim (2012), Portuguese cyclist, gunshot
- Robert Leroy Anderson (2003), American murderer and self-proclaimed serial killer, hanging
- Sophie Anderson (2023), English pornographic actress and internet personality, GHB overdose
- Rickard Andersson (2025), Swedish mass shooter that committed the Örebro school shooting
- Keith Andes (2005), American actor, asphyxiation
- Kei Aoyama (2011), Japanese manga artist, hanging
- Robert Archibald (2020), Scottish professional basketball player, gunshot
- Gustavo Arnal (2022), CFO of Bed Bath & Beyond, jumping
- Sei Ashina (2020), Japanese actress
- John Atchison (2007), American federal prosecutor and alleged child sex offender, hanging
- Emman Atienza (2025), Filipino and Taiwanese social media personality, model and mental health advocate, hanging
- Mohamed Atta (2001), Egyptian member of Al-Qaeda, and leader of the 9/11 hijackers, plane crash of American Airlines Flight 11
- Pekka-Eric Auvinen (2007), Finnish Jokela High School shooter, gunshot
- Avicii (2018), Swedish DJ and music producer, exsanguination from cuts
- Mike Awesome (2007), American professional wrestler, hanging

=== B ===
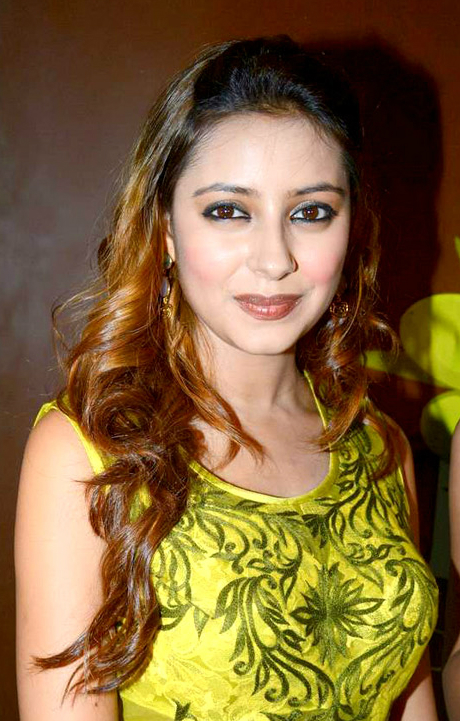
Pratyusha Banerjee

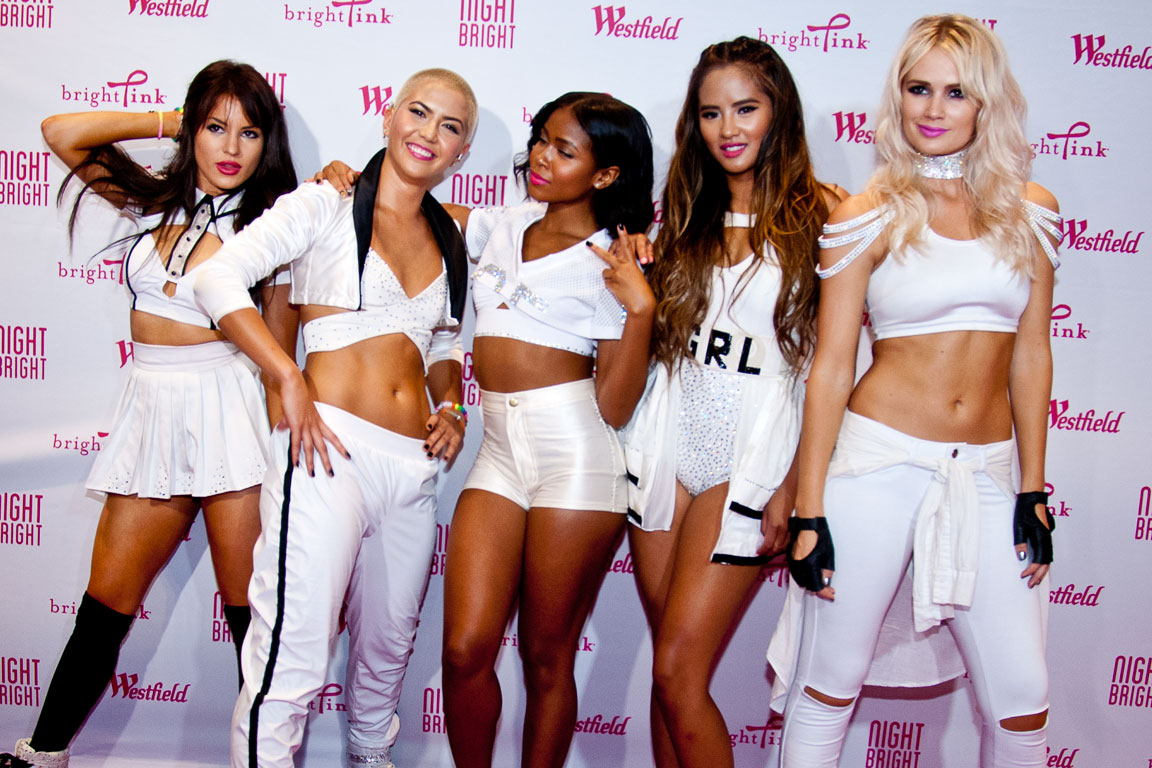
Simone Battle (center) and Lauren Bennett (right corner) with their group G.R.L.

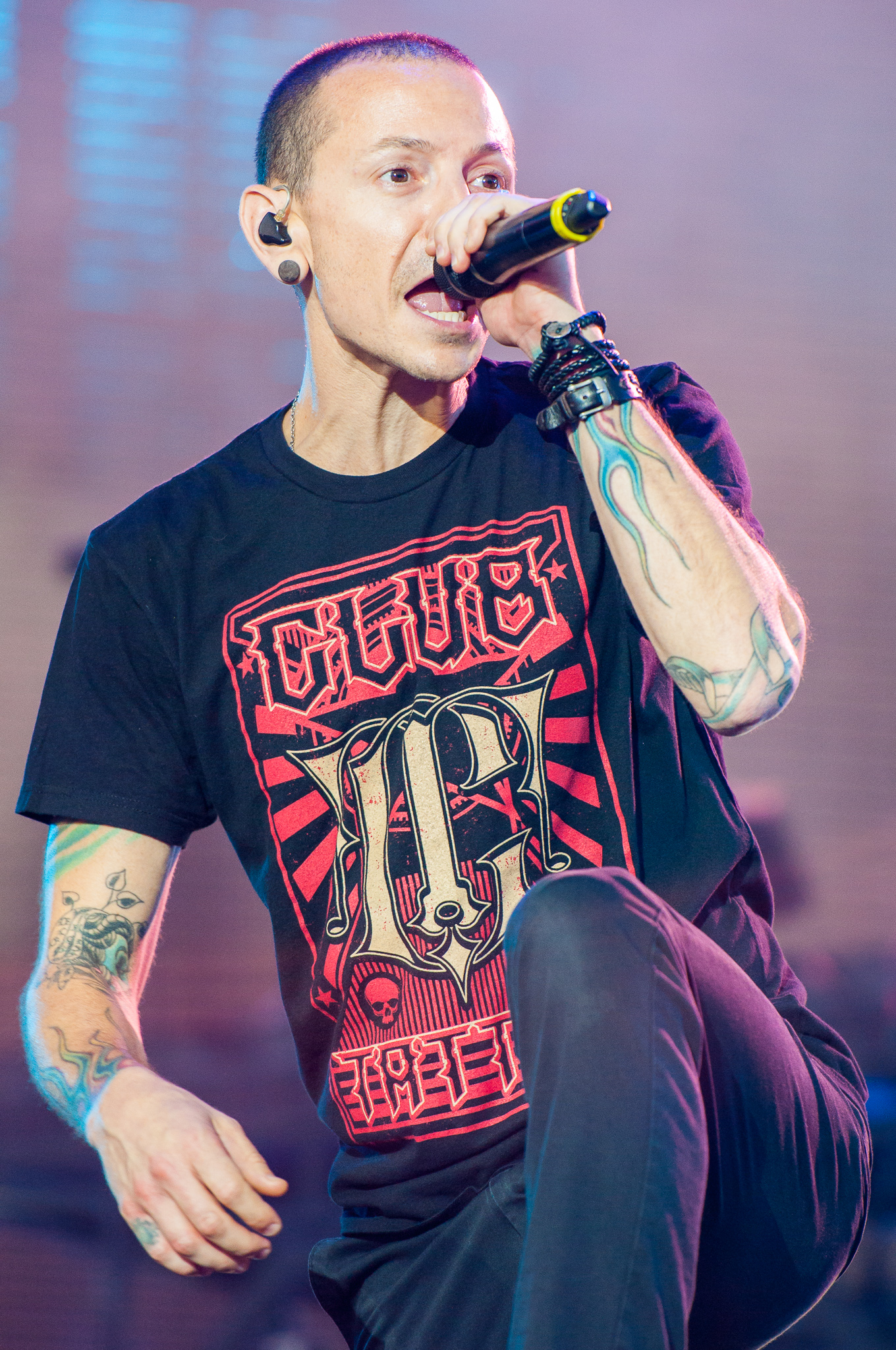
Chester Bennington

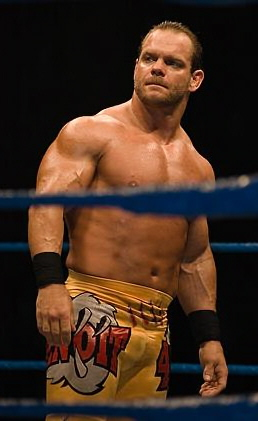
Chris Benoit

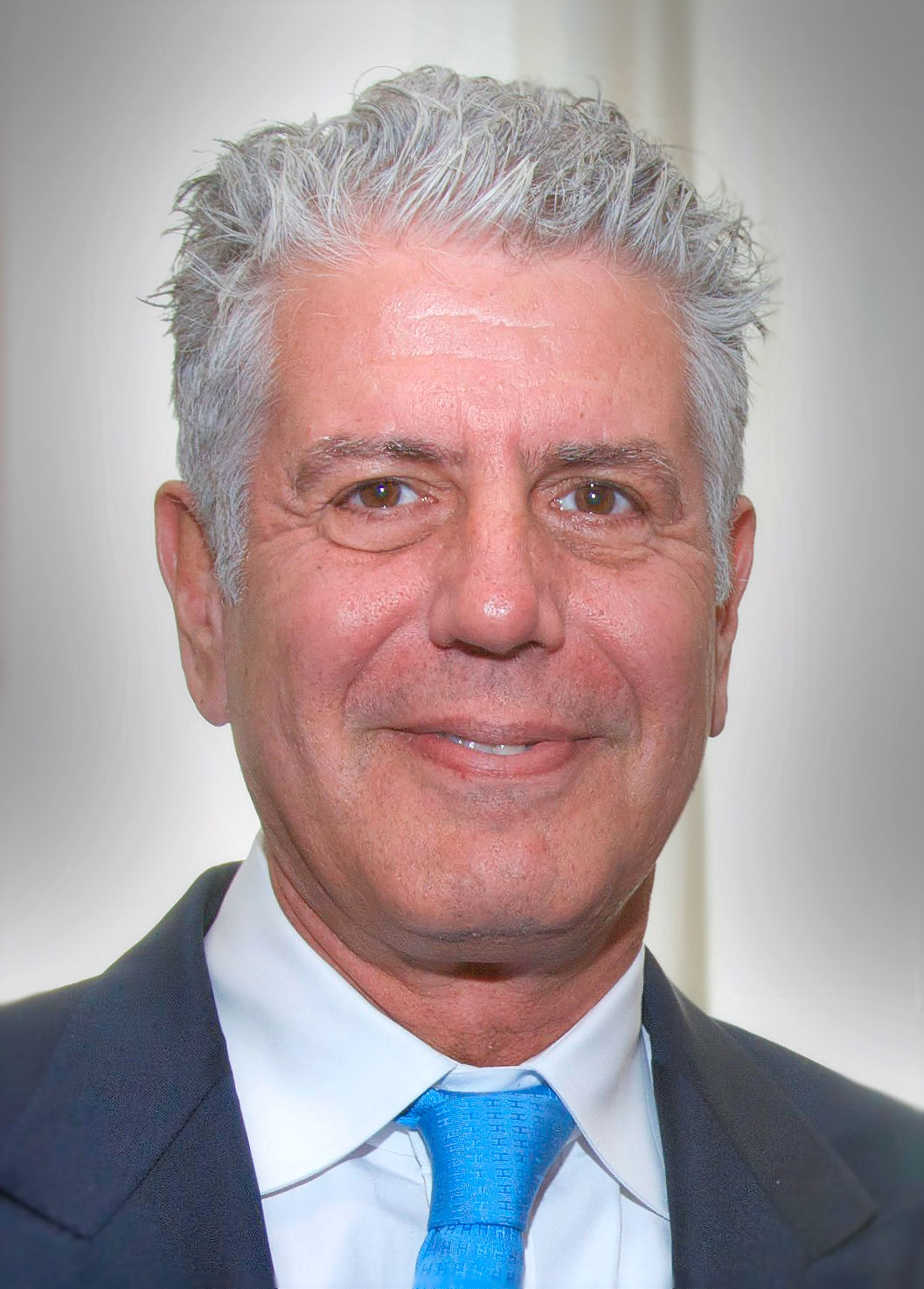
Anthony Bourdain

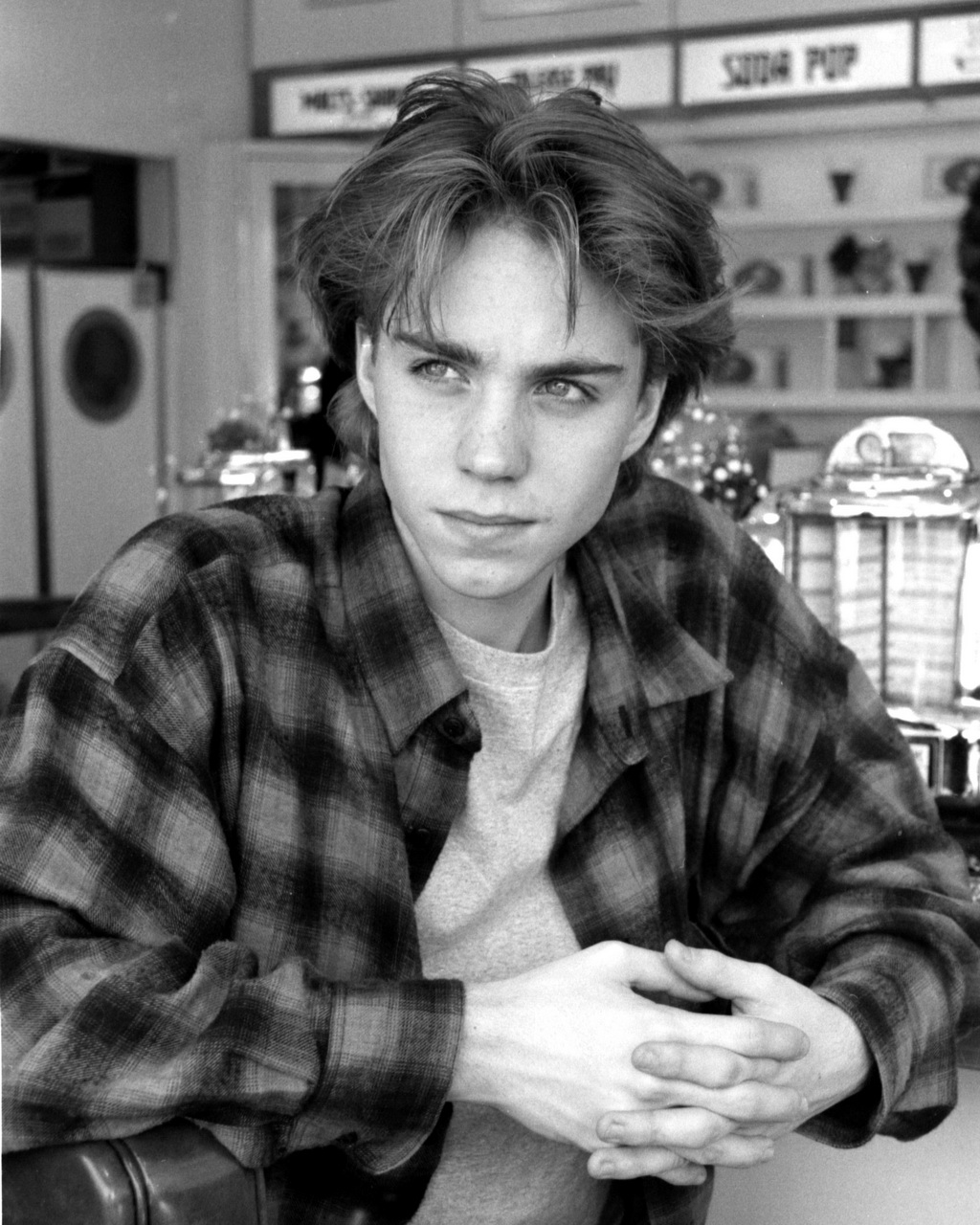
Jonathan Brandis

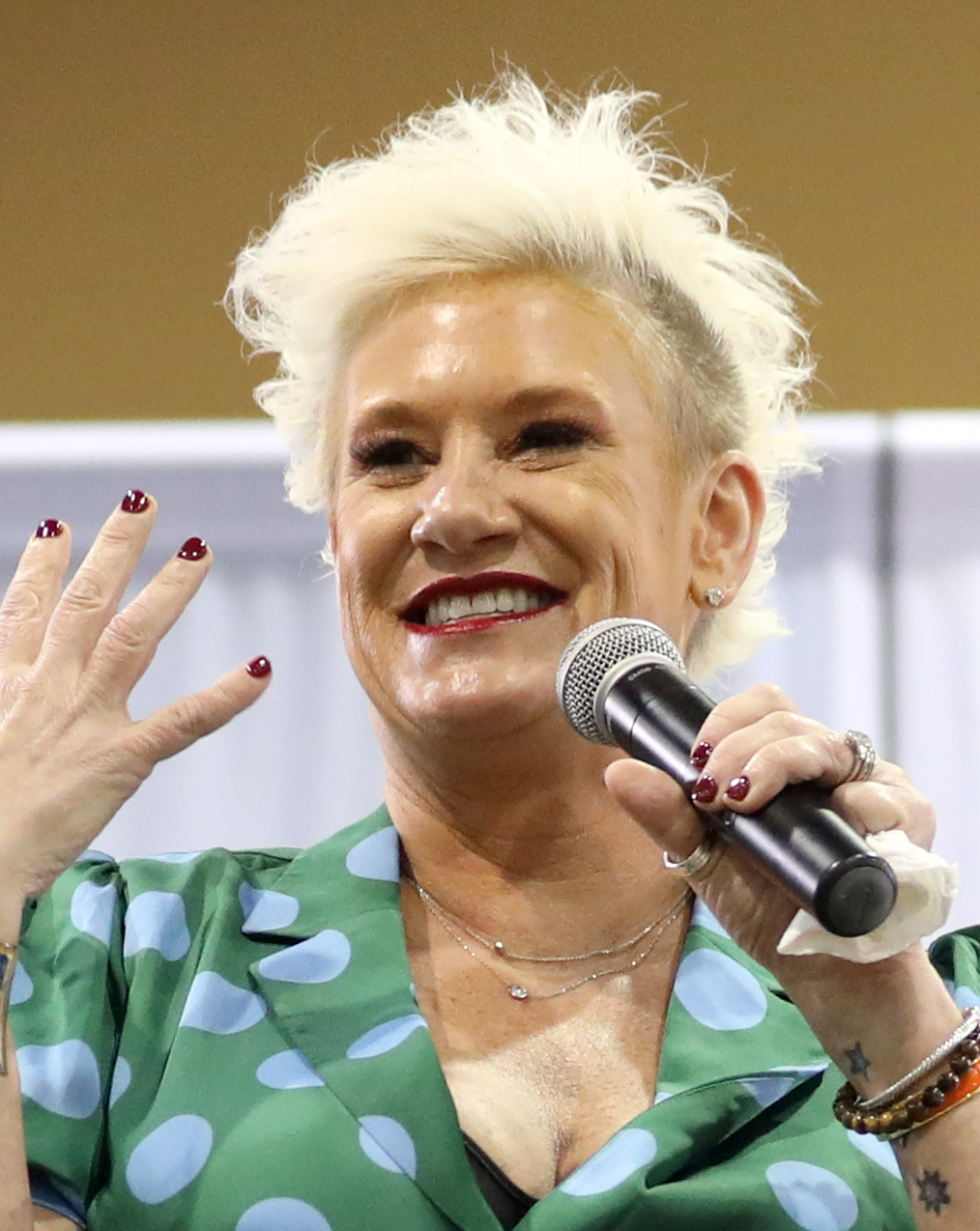
Anne Burrell

- Pamela Bach (2025), American actress, gunshot
- Nikki Bacharach (2007), American daughter of Burt Bacharach and Angie Dickinson, suffocation using plastic bag and helium
- Jeff Baena (2025), American screenwriter and film director, hanging
- Abu Bakr al-Baghdadi (2019), Iraqi-born Islamic terrorist and leader of the Islamic State, detonation of a suicide vest during a U.S. military raid on his family home.
- Mark Balelo (2013), American cast member on the reality TV series Storage Wars, carbon monoxide asphyxiation
- Pratyusha Banerjee (2016), Indian actress, hanging
- Aziza Barnes (2024), American poet, screenwriter, and playwright
- Johanna Bassani (2020), Austrian combined Nordic skier and ski jumper
- Simone Battle (2014), American pop singer and member of the band G.R.L., hanging
- J. Clifford Baxter (2002), American Enron executive, gunshot
- Matt Beard (2025), English professional football coach, hanging
- Sarah Becker (2024), American reality television personality, known for her appearances on The Real World: Miami
- Ari Behn (2019), Norwegian author and painter
- Wade Belak (2011), Canadian ice hockey player, hanging
- Jovan Belcher (2012), American football player, gunshot, murder-suicide
- Jadin Bell (2013), bullied teen, taken off life support after injuries from attempted suicide by hanging
- Malik Bendjelloul (2014), Swedish documentary filmmaker, jumped in front of moving train
- Lauren Bennett (2026), English singer who was a member of the girl groups Paradiso Girls and G.R.L., hanging
- Chester Bennington (2017), American lead singer of Linkin Park, hanging
- Chris Benoit (2007), Canadian professional wrestler, hanging
- David Berman (2019), American musician and poet, hanging
- Paul Bhattacharjee (2013), British actor, jumped from a clifftop
- Brian Bianchini (2004), American model, hanging
- Abraham Biggs (2008), American college student, livestreamed his overdose by opiates and benzodiazepines
- Steve Bing (2020), American businessman and film producer, jumped from 27th floor of apartment building
- Bob Birch (2012), American musician, gunshot
- David Birnie (2005), Australian serial killer and rapist, hanging
- Maggy Biskupski (2018), French police officer and president of Movement of Angry Police Officers (MPC), gunshot
- Jeremy Blake (2007), American artist, drowning
- Erica Blasberg (2010), American golfer, asphyxia caused prescription overdose
- Miguel Blesa (2017), Spanish banker and businessman, involved in various corruption scandals, gunshot to chest
- Isabella Blow (2007), English magazine editor, and muse to fashion designer Alexander McQueen, poisoning
- Joe Bodolai (2011), American film and television producer and writer, poisoning
- Eduardo Bonvallet (2015), Chilean World Cup footballer and pundit, hanging
- Novak Bošković (2019), Serbian handball player, gunshot
- Dmitry Bosov (2020), Russian businessman and billionaire, gunshot
- Stephen "tWitch" Boss (2022), American hip hop dancer and DJ, gunshot
- Mohamed Bouazizi (2011), Tunisian street vendor, self-immolation
- Anthony Bourdain (2018), American chef, author, and television personality, hanging
- Annalise Braakensiek (2019), Australian model
- Jonathan Brandis (2003), American actor, hanging
- Charlie Brandt (2004), American serial killer, hanging
- John Brenkus (2025), American producer, director and television personality
- Blake Brockington (2015), American LGBT advocate, vehicular impact
- Molly Brodak (2020), American poet, writer, and baker, gunshot
- Herman Brood (2001), Dutch rock musician and painter, jumped from hotel roof
- Joseph Brooks (2011), American screenwriter, director, producer, composer, and rapist, asphyxiation
- Dieter Brummer (2021), Australian actor
- Jürgen Brümmer (2014), German Olympic gymnast, jumped from the Körsch Viaduct after suffocating his son
- David Buckel (2018), American LGBT rights lawyer and environmental activist, self-immolation in Prospect Park, Brooklyn
- Randy Budd (2016), American businessman whose wife, Sharon, was critically injured and disfigured by rocks thrown at their car from an overpass, gunshot
- Julia Buencamino (2015), Filipina actress, hanging.
- Brad Bufanda (2017), American actor, jumped from building
- Anne Burrell (2025), American chef and television personality, drug overdose
- Aaron Bushnell (2024), American member of the United States Air Force, self-immolation
- Zvonko Bušić (2013), Croatian hijacker responsible for hijacking TWA Flight 355 in 1976, gunshot

=== C ===
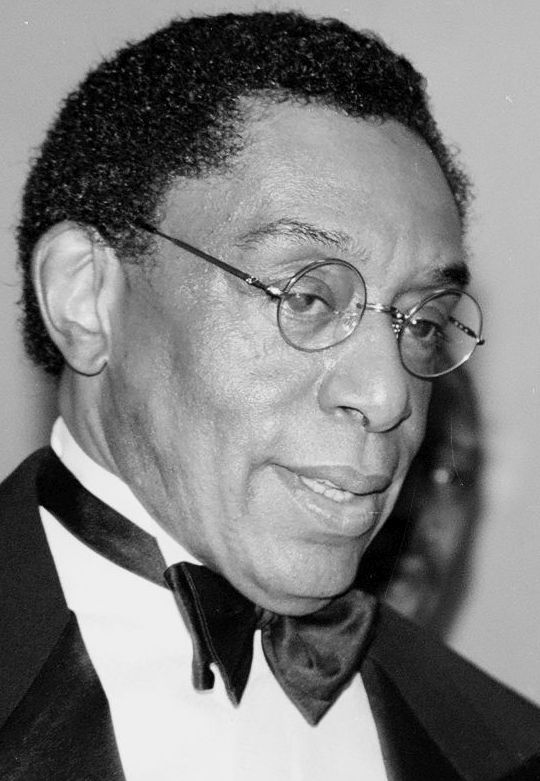
Don Cornelius

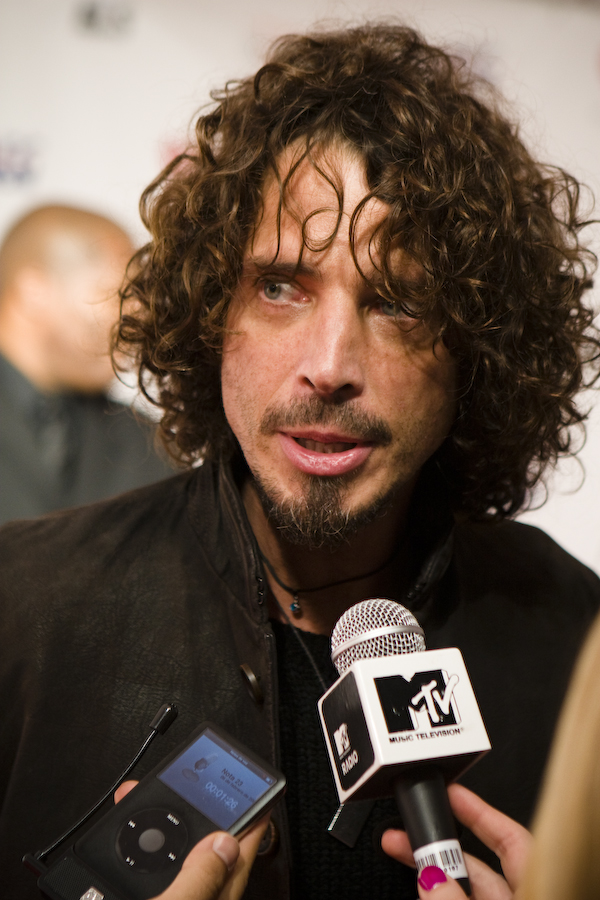
Chris Cornell

- Antonio Calvo (2011), university lecturer, cut his throat and arms.
- Eylül Cansın (2015), Turkish transgender woman, jumping
- Homaro Cantu (2015), American chef, hanging
- Capital Steez (2012), American hip-hop artist, jumped off the rooftop of the Cinematic Music Group headquarters in Manhattan
- Robert Card (2023), American former Army Reservist and perpetrator of the 2023 Lewiston shootings, gunshot
- Robert Carradine (2026), American actor known for his appearances in the Revenge of the Nerds film franchise and the TV series Lizzie McGuire, after a two-decade battle with bipolar disorder, hanging
- Tim Carter (2008), English footballer, hanging
- Neal Casal (2019), American musician
- Finn M. W. Caspersen (2009), American financier and philanthropist, gunshot
- Ariel Castro (2013), Puerto Rican-American kidnapper, rapist and murderer, hanging
- Fidel Castro Díaz-Balart (2018), Cuban nuclear physicist, son of Fidel Castro
- Kelly Catlin (2019), American cycling champion
- Antonio Catricalà (2021), Italian civil servant and lawyer, gunshot
- Champignon (2013), Brazilian musician, bassist for Charlie Brown Jr., gunshot
- Nicole Chan (2019), Canadian police officer, suicidal strangulation
- Joseph Newton Chandler III (2002), formerly unidentified identity thief, gunshot
- Pierre Chanal (2003), French serial killer, cut femoral artery
- V. B. Chandrasekhar (2019), Indian cricketer, hanging
- Iris Chang (2004), American historian and author of The Rape of Nanking, gunshot to head
- Danny Chen (2011), Chinese-American U.S. Army private, gunshot
- Chen Gang (2011), Chinese university lecturer, jumping.
- Vic Chesnutt (2009), American singer-songwriter, muscle relaxant overdose
- Leslie Cheung (2003), Hong Kong singer and actor, leapt from the 24th floor of the Mandarin Oriental hotel
- V. J. Chitra (2020), Indian actress, hanging
- Chiung Yao (2024), Taiwanese writer and film producer, charcoal burning
- Seung-Hui Cho (2007), American university student who perpetrated the Virginia Tech shooting, gunshot
- Choi Jin-sil (2008), South Korean actress, hanging
- Choi Jin-young (2010), South Korean actor and singer, hanging
- Choi Sung-bong (2023), South Korean singer
- Brian Christopher (2018), American professional wrestler, hanging
- Chung Doo-un (2019), South Korean politician
- Bob Carlos Clarke (2006), Irish photographer, jumped in front of a train
- Tyler Clementi (2010), Rutgers University student, jumped off the George Washington Bridge
- Camila María Concepción (2020), American screenwriter and transgender rights activist
- Bill Conradt (2006), assistant district attorney from Texas, gunshot
- Bubba Copeland (2023), American politician and pastor who served as mayor of Smiths Station, Alabama, Gunshot
- Tarka Cordell (2008), British musician, hanging
- Don Cornelius (2012), American television producer, best known as the creator and host of Soul Train, gunshot
- Chris Cornell (2017), American musician, singer/songwriter, and member of the bands Soundgarden and Audioslave, hanging after a performance
- John Coughlin (2019), American figure skater, hanging
- Dave Courtney (2023), English self-proclaimed gangster who became both an author and actor, gunshot
- Julee Cruise (2022), American musician

=== D ===
- Hefin David (2025), Welsh Labour politician and the Member of the Senedd (MS) for Caerphilly, hanging
- Charlotte Dawson (2014), Australian TV presenter, hanging
- Brad Delp (2007), American singer-songwriter for the bands Boston and RTZ, carbon monoxide poisoning
- Denice Denton (2006), American university professor and administrator, jumped 33 stories
- Ronald Desruelles (2015), Belgian athlete, hanging
- Norman "Dinky" Diamond (2004), English drummer for Sparks, hanging
- Dipendra of Nepal (2001), King of Nepal and perpetrator of the Nepalese royal massacre, gunshot to the head
- Thomas M. Disch (2008), American writer, gunshot
- Aleksandr Dolmatov (2013), Russian asylum seeker, undisclosed method
- Christopher Dorner (2013), former American police officer and mass shooter, gunshot
- Jon Dough (2006), American pornographic actor, hanging
- Edward Downes (2009), English conductor, assisted double suicide with wife Lady Joan Downes at the Dignitas clinic in Switzerland
- Scott Dozier (2019), American murderer, hanging
- Charmaine Dragun (2007), Australian television newsreader, jumped off The Gap
- Dave Duerson (2011), American football safety for the Chicago Bears, New York Giants, and Phoenix Cardinals, gunshot to the chest
- Clay Duke (2010), American ex-convict, gunshot
- Theresa Duncan (2007), American video game designer, blogger, filmmaker and critic, ingestion of Tylenol and alcohol

=== E ===
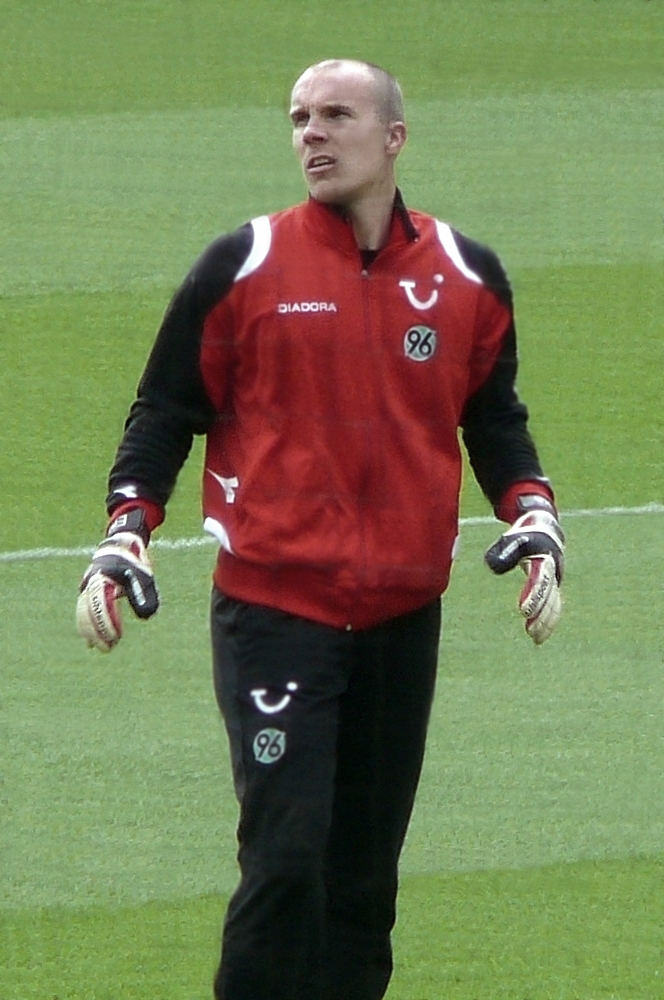
Robert Enke

- Volker Eckert (2007), German serial killer, hanging
- Naima El Bezaz (2020), Moroccan-Dutch writer
- Keith Emerson (2016), English rock musician, keyboardist, and composer for the bands The Nice and Emerson, Lake & Palmer, gunshot to the head
- Martin Emond (2004), New Zealand cartoonist and painter, hanging
- Robert Enke (2009), German footballer, struck by train
- Etika (2019), American YouTuber and streamer, drowned after jumping from the Manhattan Bridge
- Dolly Everett (2018), Australian teen, undisclosed method.
- Richard Evonitz (2002), American serial killer and kidnapper

=== F ===
Keith Flint

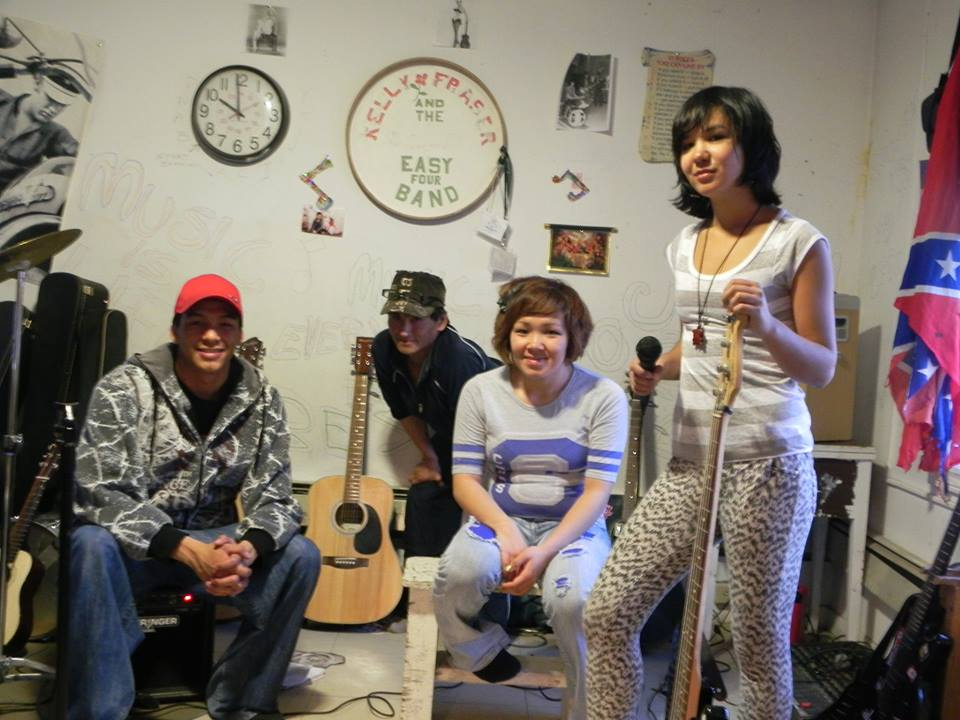
Kelly Fraser (pictured right) and her band The Easy Four

- Justin Fairfax (2026), American lawyer and politician, gunshot
- Angus Fairhurst (2008), English artist, hanging
- Jackie Fairweather (2014), Australian triathlete, undisclosed method
- Moni Fanan (2009), Israeli basketball executive Maccabi Tel Aviv, hanging
- Fausto Fanti (2014), Brazilian humorist known as a member of the comedy troupe Hermes & Renato, and guitarist for Massacration, hanging
- Richard Farnsworth (2000), American actor, gunshot
- René Favaloro (2000), Argentine cardiac surgeon (created technique for coronary bypass surgery), gunshot to the heart
- José Feghali (2014), Brazilian pianist, winner of the 1985 Van Cliburn International Piano Competition, gunshot to head
- Malevo Ferreyra (2008), Argentine police chief accused of multiple murders and acts of torture during the 1970s, gunshot to the head.
- Anton Fier (2022), American drummer, composer and bandleader, assisted suicide.
- Amina El Filali (2012), Moroccan teenager forced to marry her rapist, rat poison.
- Mark Fisher (2017), English writer and political theorist, hanging.
- Mathieu Fischer (2021), Belgian survivor of the 2016 Brussels bombings.
- Caroline Flack (2020), English radio and television presenter, hanging.
- Mike Flanagan (2011), American baseball player and 1979 American League Cy Young Award winner. shotgun wound to the head.
- Vester Flanagan (2015), American television news reporter responsible for killing Alison Parker and Adam Ward, gunshot to the head.
- Mark Fleischman (2022), American businessman and onetime owner of Studio 54, assisted suicide with the aid of the assisted dying non-profit Dignitas.
- Keith Flint (2019), English singer and dancer for The Prodigy, hanging.
- David Fonseca (2015), Former Belize City mayor, gunshot to head
- André "Dédé" Fortin (2000), Canadian songwriter, singer and guitarist (Les Colocs), stabbing.
- Verónica Forqué (2021), Spanish actress, suicide by hanging after a long depression.
- Christopher Foster (2008), Businessman, killed his wife, daughter, horses and dogs before setting the family house on fire, gunshot and self-immolation
- Jason David Frank (2022), American actor known for the TV series Mighty Morphin Power Rangers, hanging.
- Kelly Fraser (2019), Canadian pop singer and songwriter.
- Danny Frawley (2019), Former Australian Rules footballer and broadcaster, suicide by intentional car accident
- Ryan Freel (2012), American professional baseball player, gunshot.
- Travis Fulton (2021), American boxer and mixed martial artist fighter, hanging.

=== G ===
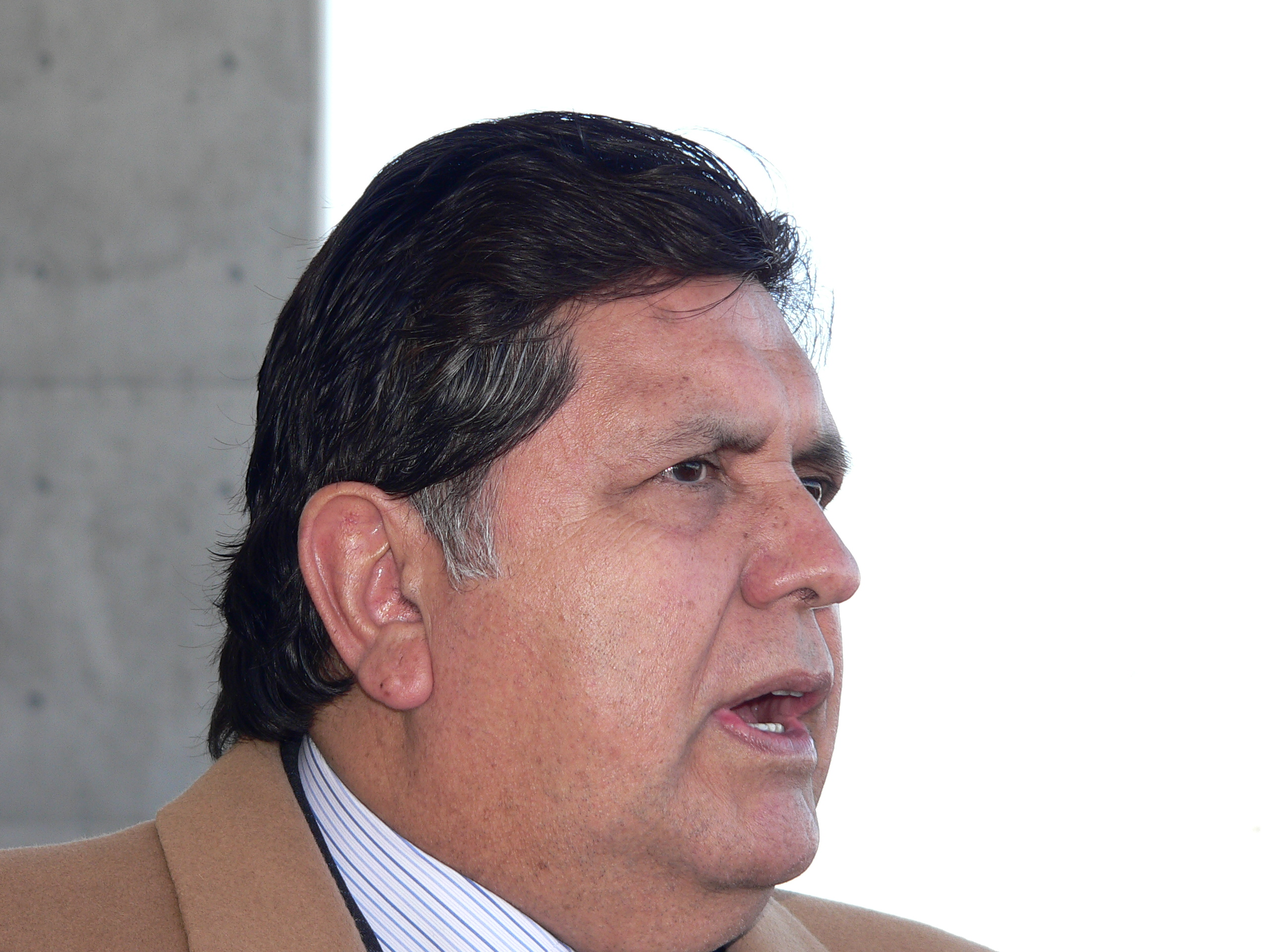
Alan García

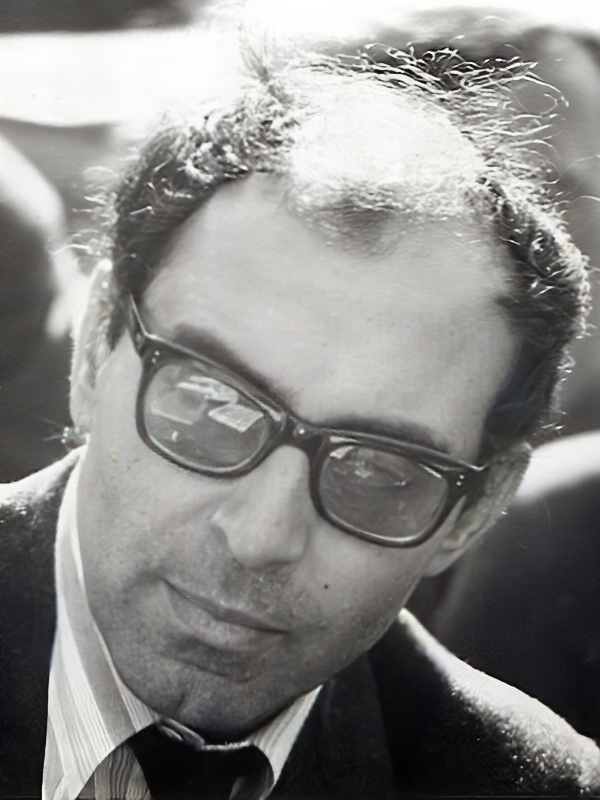
Jean-Luc Godard

- Anthony Galindo (2020), Venezuelan singer
- Alan García (2019), Peruvian politician who served as President of Peru from 1985 to 1990 and again from 2006 to 2011, gunshot
- Jamir Garcia (2020), Filipino singer, vocalist of the band Slapshock, hanging
- Santiago García (2021), Uruguayan soccer player, gunshot
- Arturo Gatti (2009), Canadian professional boxer, hanging
- John Geddert (2021), American gymnastics coach, gunshot shortly after being charged with 24 felony counts related to sexual abuse of his trainees
- Babak Ghorbani (2014), Iranian wrestler, overdose
- Jeremy Giambi (2022), American retired baseball player, gunshot to chest
- Sam Gillespie (2003), philosopher whose writings and translations were crucial to the initial reception of Alain Badiou's work in the English-speaking world
- Virginia Giuffre (2025), American-Australian advocate for survivors of sex trafficking, and accuser of child sex offender Jeffrey Epstein and Britain's Prince Andrew
- Joe Gliniewicz (2015), American police officer, gunshot
- John Wayne Glover (2005), Australian serial killer, hanging
- Jean-Luc Godard (2022), French-Swiss film director and film critic, assisted suicide procedure
- David Goodall (2018), English-born Australian botanist and ecologist, physician-assisted suicide
- Uvaraja Gopal (2023), Singaporean police sergeant, jumping.
- Lucy Gordon (2009), English actress and model, hanging
- Daisuke Gōri (2010), Japanese voice actor, narrator and actor, cut his wrist
- Mike Graham (2012), American professional wrestler, gunshot
- Sophie Gradon (2018), English model and television personality, hanging
- Bob Grant (2003), English actor, carbon monoxide poisoning
- Spalding Gray (2004), American actor, playwright, screenwriter, performance artist, and monologuist, jumped off the Staten Island Ferry
- Mark Green (2004), American record-setting minor league hockey star, hanging
- Paul Gruchow (2004), American writer, drug overdose

=== H ===
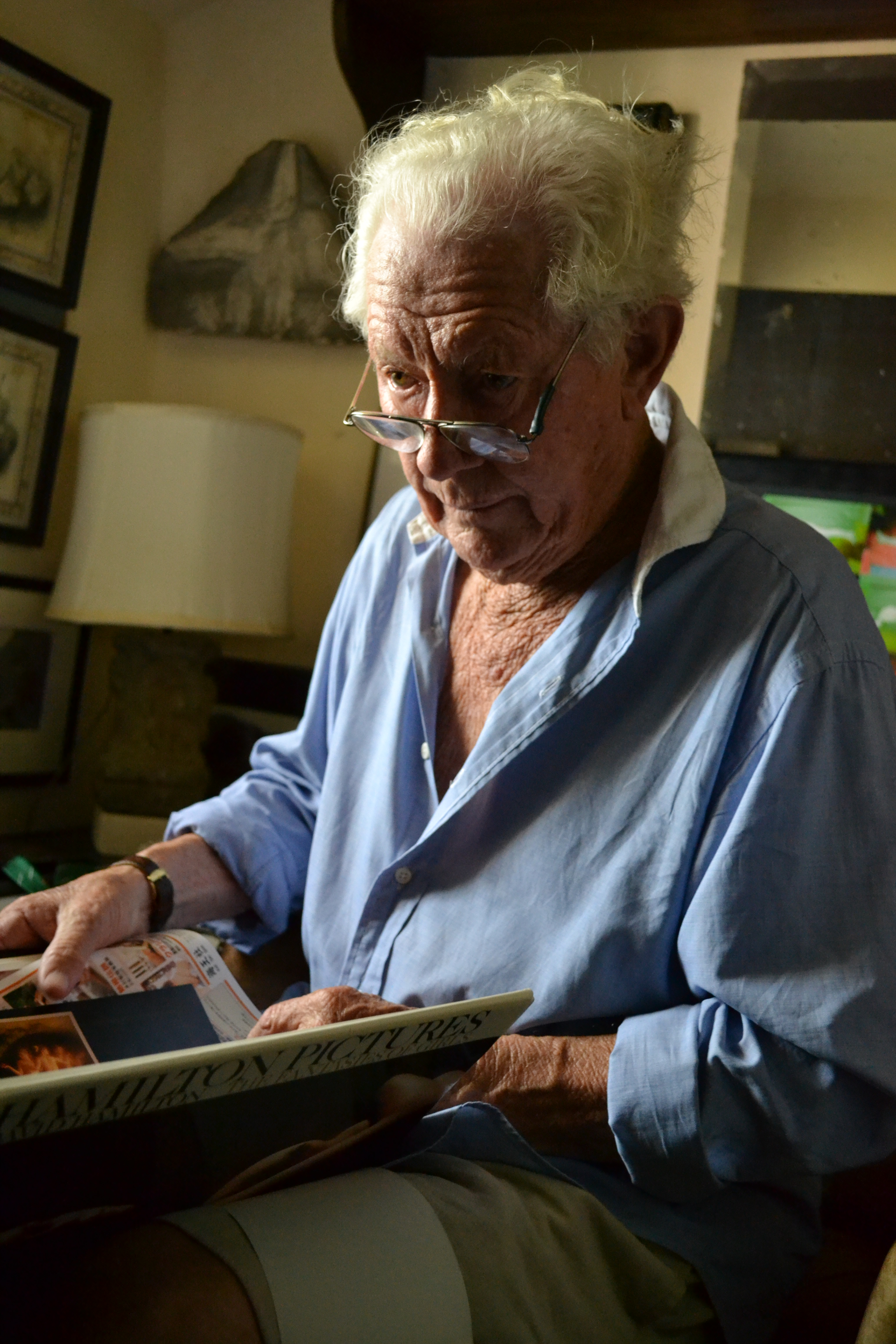
David Hamilton

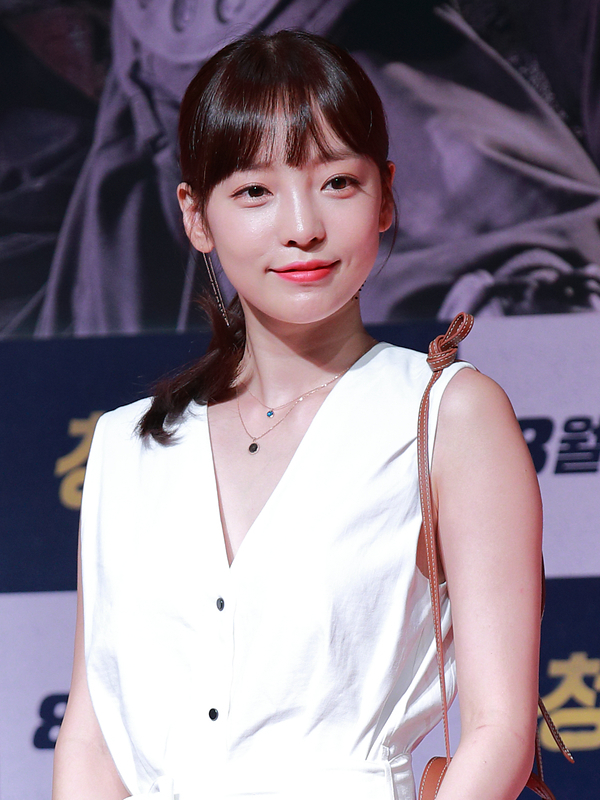
Goo Hara

- Charles Haddon (2010), English lead singer of pop-synth band Ou Est le Swimming Pool, hanging
- Charlie Haeger (2020), American baseball player, gunshot
- Jason Hairston (2018), American football player
- Ryan Halligan (2003), bullied American middle school student, hanging
- Tony Halme (2010), Finnish athlete, actor and politician, gunshot
- Hani Hanjour (2001), Saudi member of Al-Qaeda and 9/11 hijacker, American Airlines Flight 77
- David Hamilton (2016), British photographer and filmmaker known for his nudes of pubescent girls, asphyxiation via plastic bag after several of his models accused him of rape
- Goo Hara (2019), South Korean singer
- Neda Hassani (2003), Iranian protester, self-immolation in front of French embassy in London
- Robert Hawkins (2007), American mass murderer, perpetrator of the Westroads Mall shooting, gunshot
- Marvin Heemeyer (2004), American welder who went on a rampage with a modified bulldozer, gunshot
- Sarah Hegazi (2020), Egyptian LGBT activist
- Claudia Heill (2011), Austrian judoka, jump from a sixth story window
- Benjamin Hendrickson (2006), American actor, gunshot
- Victor Heringer (2018), Brazilian novelist and poet, winner of the 2013 Prêmio Jabuti, self-defenestration
- Aaron Hernandez (2017), American football player and convicted murderer, hanging in prison cell, five days after his acquittal from a separate murder charge. Hernandez was posthumously diagnosed with chronic traumatic encephalopathy (CTE), which has led to speculation over how the condition may have affected his behavior.
- Wolfgang Herrndorf (2013), German writer, gunshot
- Paul Hester (2005), Australian drummer for Split Enz and Crowded House, hanging
- John Hicklenton (2010), British comics artist, assisted suicide the Dignitas clinic in Switzerland
- Tyler Hilinski (2018), American football quarterback, gunshot
- Ludwig Hirsch (2011), Austrian singer, songwriter and actor, jumped from the second floor of a hospital window
- Brandon Hixon (2018), American politician, gunshot
- Richard Holden (2005), Canadian politician, leapt from 8th-floor balcony
- Crash Holly (2003), American wrestler, asphyxia due to pulmonary aspiration as a result of an alcohol and drug overdose
- Alec Holowka (2019), Canadian video game programmer, designer, and musician
- Tyler Honeycutt (2018), American basketball player (Sacramento Kings, Khimki), gunshot
- Harry Horse (2007), English author, illustrator, cartoonist and musician, stabbed himself 47 times in a murder-suicide
- Silvio Horta (2020), American screenwriter and television producer, gunshot
- Blake Hounshell (2023), American journalist and editor
- Mike Howe (2021), American singer, and member of the heavy metal band Metal Church
- Hsu Kun-yuan (2020), Taiwanese politician, jumped off his home
- Hu Bo (2017), Chinese novelist and director
- Nicholas Hughes (2009), fisheries biologist, son of renowned poet Sylvia Plath, hanging
- Scott Hutchison (2018), Scottish singer, songwriter and guitarist of the band Frightened Rabbit, and artist, body found and later determined suicide

=== I ===
- Hideki Irabu (2011), Japanese professional baseball player, hanging
- Bruce Ivins (2008), American microbiologist and suspect in the 2001 anthrax attacks, overdose of paracetamol

=== J ===
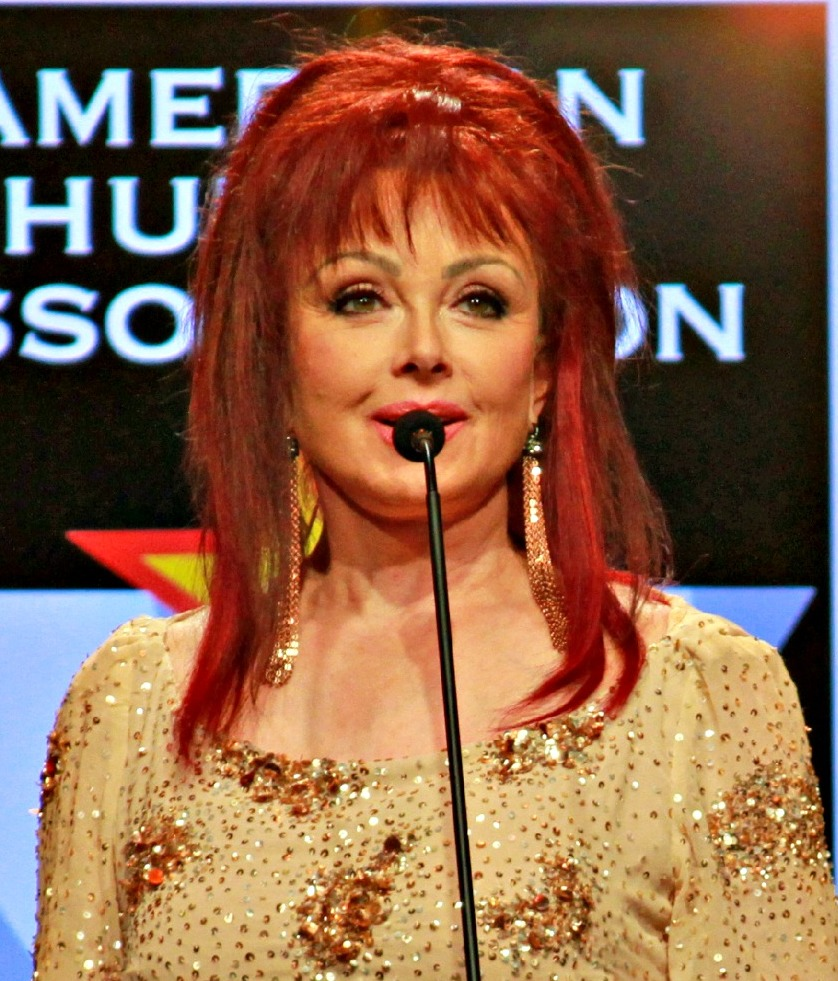
Naomi Judd

- Marcel Jacob (2009), Swedish bassist for the hard rock bands Talisman and Yngwie Malmsteen
- Irwin L. Jacobs (2019), American businessman, CEO of Genmar Holdings, gunshot after murdering his wife
- M. Jaishankar (2018), Indian serial killer and rapist, slitting his own throat
- Mohammad Mael Jalani (2026), perpetrator of the 2026 Zamboanga City school shooting, gunshot
- Jill Janus (2018), American lead singer of the metal band Huntress
- Jang Ja-yeon (2009), South Korean actress, hanging
- Rick Jason (2000), American actor, gunshot
- Jaxon (2006), American cartoonist and illustrator
- Richard Jeni (2007), American standup comedian and actor, gunshot
- Ryan Jenkins (2009), American contestant on the 2009 reality TV series Megan Wants a Millionaire, hanging
- Jeon Mi-seon (2019), South Korean actress, hanging
- Jeong Da-bin (2007), South Korean actress, hanging
- Jo Min-ki (2018), South Korean actor, hanging
- Dan Johnson (2017), American politician, Republican member of the Kentucky House of Representatives, gunshot
- George Robert Johnston (2004), Canadian burglar and fugitive known as the Ballarat Bandit, gunshot
- Greg Johnson (2019), Canadian ice hockey player, gunshot
- J. J. Johnson (2001), American Bebop trombonist, gunshot
- Pavle Jovanonic (2020), Serbian-American Olympic bobsledder
- Naomi Judd (2022), American country music singer and actress, gunshot

=== K ===
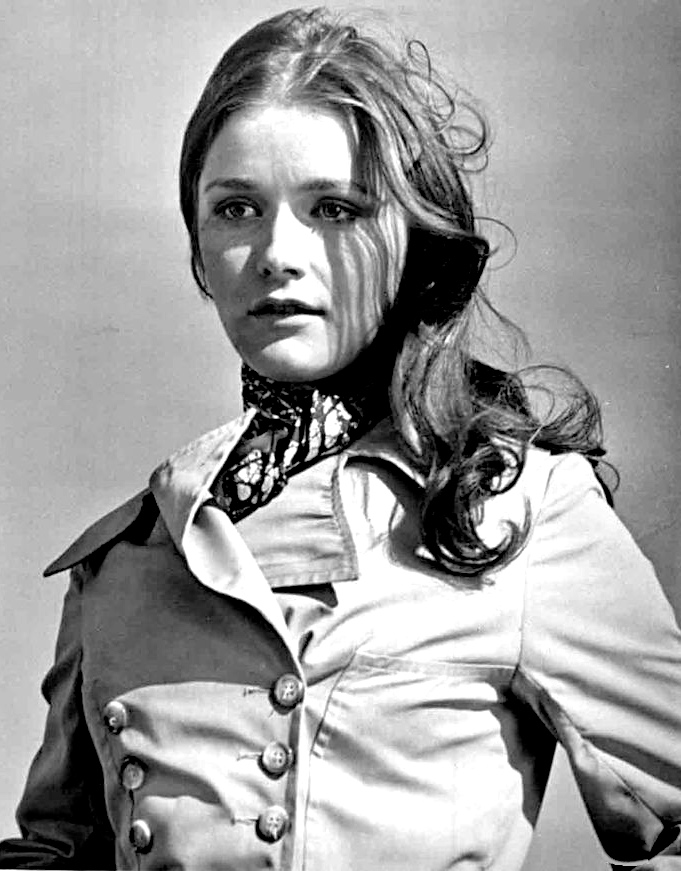
Margot Kidder

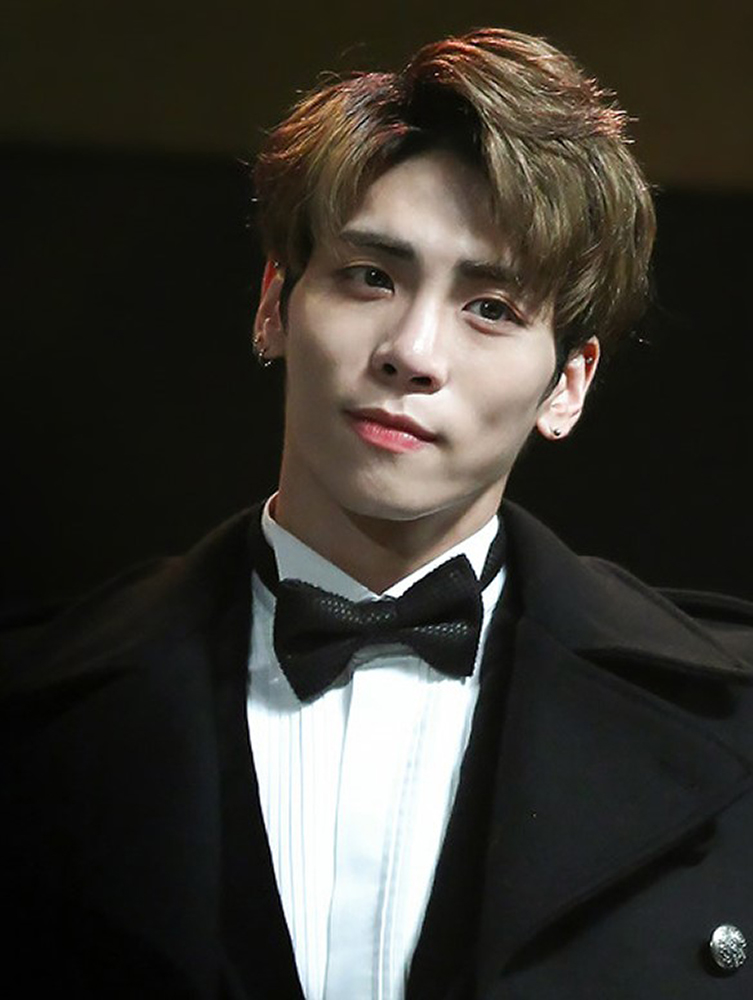
Jong-hyun Kim

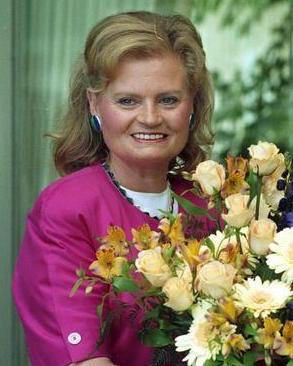
Hannelore Kohl

- Ted Kaczynski (2023), American mathematician and domestic terrorist known as the Unabomber, hanging
- Antonie Kamerling (2010), Dutch actor and musician, hanging
- Sayaka Kanda (2021), Japanese actress and singer, jumped from an upper floor of a hotel
- Chris Kanyon (2010), American professional wrestler, overdose of anti-depressant pills
- Kagney Linn Karter (2024), American pornographic film actress, gunshot
- Kazuhiko Katō (2009), Japanese musician, hanging
- Nicky Katt (2025), American actor, hanging
- Steven Kazmierczak (2008), American mass murderer, perpetrator of the Northern Illinois University shooting, gunshot.
- David Kellermann (2009), American businessman and CFO of Freddie Mac, suicide by hanging.
- Mike Kelley (2012), American artist, carbon monoxide poisoning
- Ömer Ket (2026), Turkish student and shooter, self-inflicted gun wound
- Israel Keyes (2012), American serial killer, slit wrists and strangulation
- Jiah Khan (2013), British American actress of Indian descent, hanging
- Sahar Khodayari (2019), Iranian activist who self-immolated in front of the Islamic Revolutionary Court of Tehran
- Margot Kidder (2018), Canadian-American actress, known for her role as Lois Lane in Superman feature films, drug and alcohol overdose
- Daul Kim (2009), South Korean model and blogger, hanged in her Paris apartment
- Kim Ji-hoo (2008), South Korean model and actor, hanging
- Kim Ji-hoon (2013), South Korean singer-songwriter (Two Two) and actor, hanging
- Kim Jong-hyun (2017), South Korean singer-songwriter, radio host, and member of boy band Shinee, carbon monoxide poisoning
- Kim Sae-ron (2025), South Korean actress
- Yu-ri Kim (2011), South Korean model, poison
- Hana Kimura (2020), Japanese wrestler, hydrogen sulfide poisoning
- Uday Kiran (2014), Indian actor, hanging
- Stan Kirsch (2020), American actor, hanging
- R. B. Kitaj (2007), American artist, suffocation
- John Kivela (2017), American politician, hanging
- Marshawn Kneeland (2025), American football player for the Dallas Cowboys, gunshot after police chase
- Billy Knight (2018), UCLA basketball player, blunt force injuries
- Jak Knight (2022), American comedian and TV writer, gunshot
- Andrew Koenig (2010), American actor, hanging
- Hannelore Kohl (2001), German wife of German Chancellor Helmut Kohl, overdose of sleeping pills
- Takako Konishi (2001), Japanese office worker known for an urban legend surrounding her death, froze to death
- Ruslana Korshunova (2008), Kazakhstani model, aged 20, jumped from the ninth-floor balcony of her apartment in New York City
- Stephen Kovacs (2022), American fencer and fencing coach, hanging with laundry bag while in prison
- Oleksandr Kovalenko (2010), Ukrainian football player and referee, jumped from his apartment
- Alec Kreider (2017), American convicted triple murderer, hanging
- Tim Kretschmer (2009), German student and mass shooter, gunshot
- Norbert Kröcher (2016), German 2 June Movement terrorist, gunshot
- Alan Krueger (2019), American economist
- Cheslie Kryst (2022), American model and presenter known as Miss USA 2019, jump from a Manhattan high-rise
- Arda Küçükyetim (2026), Turkish neo-Nazi that committed the 2024 Eskişehir stabbing
- Ashwani Kumar (2020), Indian police officer and politician who served as governor of Nagaland from 2013 to 2014, hanging
- Richard Kyanka (2021), American web developer and founder of Something Awful, gunshot

=== L ===
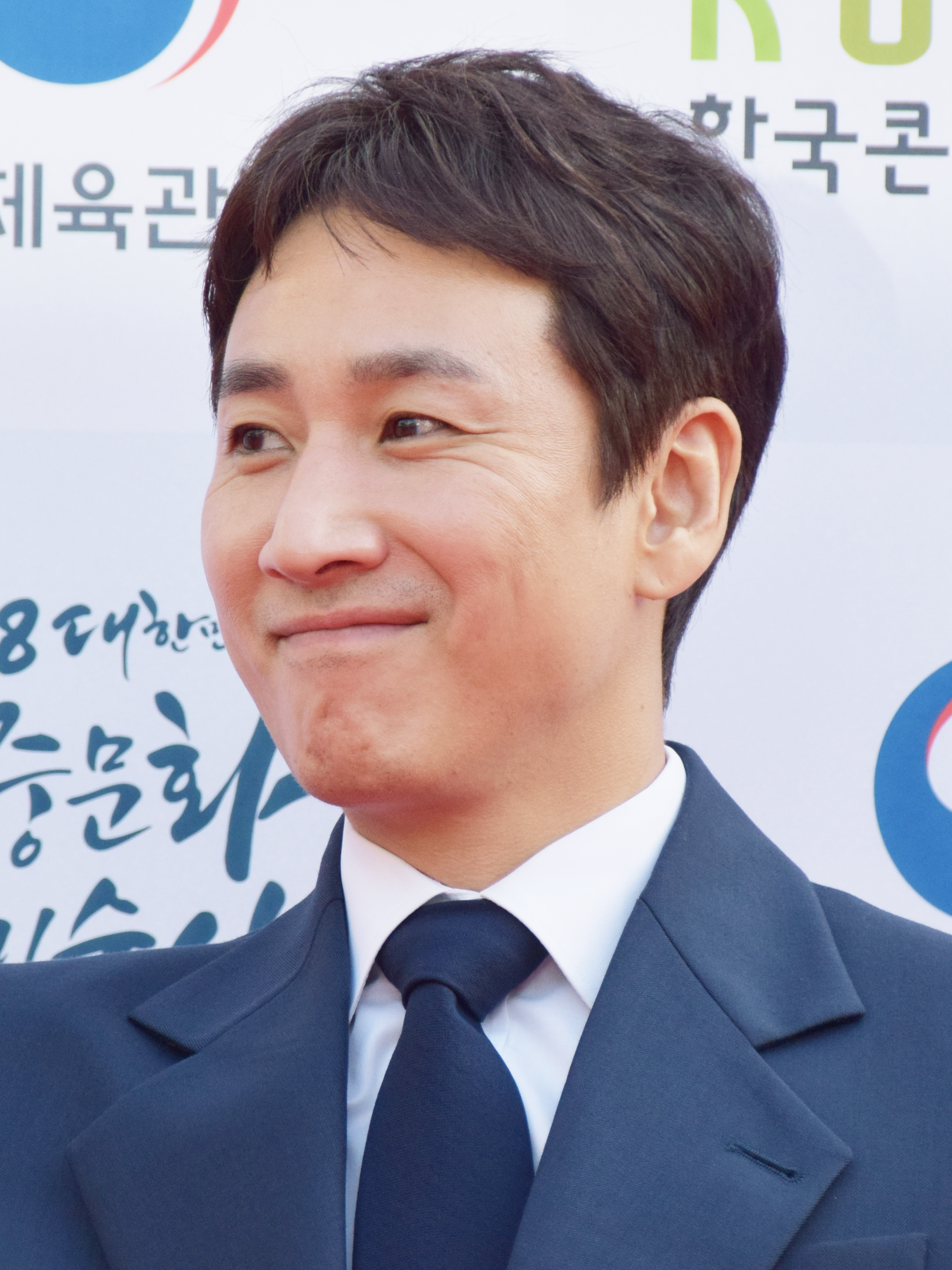
Lee Sun-Kyun

- Deborah Laake (2000), American columnist and writer, overdose of pills
- Kyren Lacy (2025), American football player, gunshot
- Paul Lambert (2020), British television journalist, producer and communications director
- Karen Lancaume (2005), French pornographic film actress, overdose of temazepam
- Andrew E. Lange (2010), American astrophysicist
- Adam Lanza (2012), perpetrator of the Sandy Hook Elementary School shooting, gunshot to the head
- Don Lapre (2011), American television pitchman noted for several products, cut throat with a razor blade
- Fathima Latheef (2019), Indian post-graduate student, hanging.
- Brian Laundrie (2021), American partner of formerly missing woman Gabby Petito, gunshot to head weeks after killing Petito
- Coco Lee (2023), Hong Kong American singer
- Lee Eun-ju (2005), South Korean actress, slit wrists and hanging
- Lee Hye-Ryeon (2007), South Korean singer, known as U;Nee, hanging
- Jon Lee (2002), Welsh drummer for the British rock band Feeder, hanging
- Sara Lee (2022), American professional wrestler, combined drug intoxication
- Lee Sun-Kyun (2023), Korean actor, carbon monoxide poisoning
- Thomas H. Lee (2023), American financier, gunshot
- Friedrich Leibacher (2001), Swiss mass murderer, gunshot
- Claude Lemieux (2026), Canadian retired professional ice hockey player, hanging
- Dave Lepard (2006), Swedish singer and guitarist (Crashdïet), hanging
- Andrzej Lepper (2011), Polish politician known as the leader of Samoobrona RP (Self-Defense of the Republic of Poland), hanging
- Arnie Lerma (2018), American former Scientologist and critic of Scientology, gunshot
- Harry Lew (2011), United States Marine, gunshot
- Chris Lighty (2012), American music industry executive and manager, gunshot
- lil' Chris (2015), English pop singer, hanging
- Lil Loaded (2021), American rapper, gunshot to head
- Mark Linkous (2010), American musician, gunshot to the heart
- Matthew Livelsberger (2025), United States Army Green Beret and perpetrator of the 2025 Las Vegas Cybertruck explosion, gunshot to mouth before explosion
- Carlo Lizzani (2013), Italian film director, jumped from a balcony
- Kevin James Loibl (2016), murderer of Christina Grimmie, gunshot
- Bernard Loiseau (2003), French chef, shotgun blast to the head
- Terry Long (2005), American football player, poisioning
- Ellen Joyce Loo (2018), Canadian-Hong Kong musician, singer, songwriter, and co-founder of the folk-pop rock group at17, fall from her high-rise apartment building
- Andreas Lubitz (2015), co-pilot of Germanwings Flight 9525, plane crash
- Roman Lyashenko (2003), Russian NHL hockey player, hanging
- David Lytton (2015), a formerly unidentified British man found on Saddleworth Moor, strychnine

=== M ===
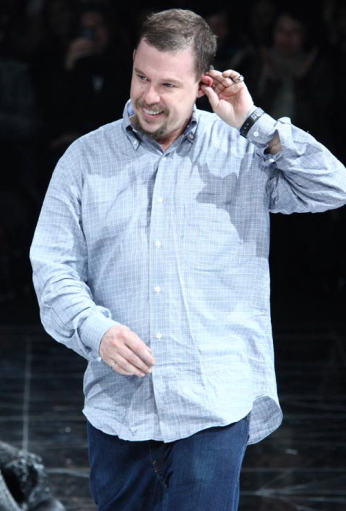
Alexander McQueen

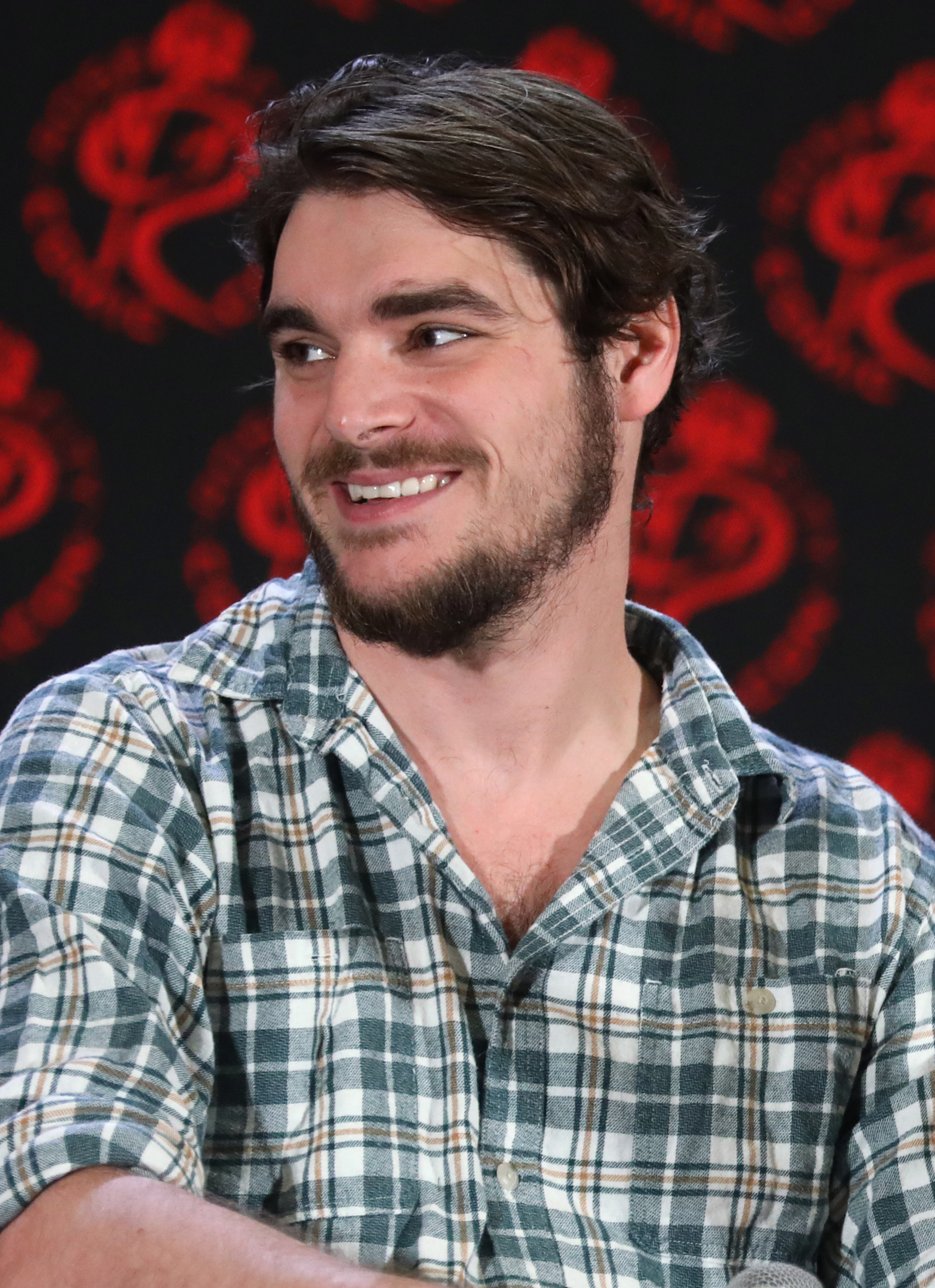
RJ Mitte

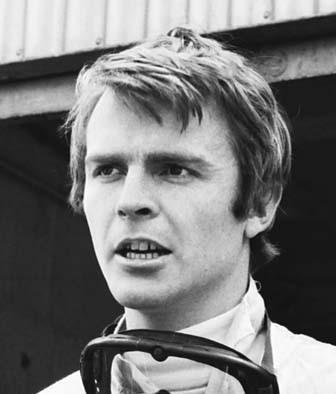
Max Mosley

- Pua Magasiva (2019), New Zealand actor known for Power Rangers Ninja Storm and Shortland Street
- Piotr "Magik" Łuszcz (2000), Polish rapper known from Kaliber 44 and Paktofonika, jumping off of his window
- Bhaiyyu Maharaj (2018), Indian spiritual guru, gunshot
- Sean Malone (2020), American bassist of Cynic
- Mădălina Manole (2010), Romanian pop singer, pesticide poisoning
- Michael Mantenuto (2017), American actor and ice hockey player, best known for his performance as Jack O'Callahan in the 2004 biopic Miracle, gunshot
- Michael Marin (2012), American businessman, cyanide pill
- Philip Markoff (2010), Medical student, Boston University
- Andrew Martinez (2006), American nudism activist who became known on the University of California, Berkeley campus as the "Naked Guy", suffocation
- Williams Martínez (2021), Uruguayan soccer player
- Lisa Lynn Masters (2016), American actress, writer, and model
- Troy Masters (2024), American journalist and editor
- Tadahiro Matsushita (2012), Japanese politician, hanging
- David Edward Maust (2006), American serial killer, hanging
- Faigy Mayer (2015), American app developer, jumped from 20th floor rooftop bar
- Jacques Mayol (2001), French free diver and subject of the movie The Big Blue, hanging
- John McAfee (2021), British-American computer programmer, businessman and founder of the computer security software company McAfee, hanging
- Allyson McConnell (2013), Australian-Canadian woman who killed her two children, jumped off a bridge while in Australia
- Susannah McCorkle (2001), American jazz singer, jumping from apartment
- Mindy McCready (2013), American country music singer, gunshot
- Kenny McKinley (2010), American football player, gunshot
- Chris McKinstry (2006), Canadian artificial intelligence researcher
- John B. McLemore (2015), American horologist and subject of the podcast S-Town, ingested potassium cyanide
- Ronnie McNutt (2020), American war veteran, single-shot rifle
- Alexander McQueen (2010), British fashion designer and couturier, hanging
- Briony McRoberts (2013), English actress, stepped in front of a District line train at Fulham Broadway tube station in London
- Megan Meier (2006), American high school student and victim of bullying, hanging
- Adolf Merckle (2009), German entrepreneur and billionaire, train
- Jill Messick (2018), American film producer
- Katie Meyer (2022), American soccer player
- Maningning Miclat (2000), Filipino poet and painter, jumped from the seventh floor of a building
- Flávio Migliaccio (2020), Brazilian actor, film director and screenwriter, hanging
- Filip Minarik (2023), Czech jockey, three years after sustaining serious head injuries, method not disclosed
- Dave Mirra (2016), American BMX rider who later competed in rallycross racing, gunshot
- RJ Mitte (2026), American actor and cerebral palsy advocate, hanging
- Haruma Miura (2020), Japanese actor, hanging
- Shizuka Miura (2010), Japanese doll maker and musician, possibly related to medication
- Mario Monicelli (2010), Italian film director, jumped out of a hospital window
- Moonbin (2023), South Korean singer and actor, undisclosed method
- Marie Lynn Moore (2009), American murderer (filicide), gunshot
- Richard Morecroft (2026), Australian radio announcer, TV newsreader and presenter, voluntary assisted dying.
- Ronald Lee Moore (2008), American fugitive and suspected serial killer, hanging
- A. R. Morlan (2016), American author
- Gray Morrow (2001), American comics artist and illustrator, gunshot
- Max Mosley (2021), British FIA president, gunshot after learning of terminal illness
- Jason Moss (2006), American attorney and author of The Last Victim, gunshot
- Miljan Mrdaković (2020), Serbian footballer, gunshot
- Uwe Mundlos (2011), German National Socialist Underground terrorist, gunshot
- Ian Murdock (2015), American software engineer and founder of the Debian Linux operating system, hanging
- Grayson Murray (2024), American professional golfer and winner of two PGA Tour events, carbon monoxide poisoning
- Alec Musser (2024), American actor and fitness model, shot himself in the chest with a shotgun

=== N ===
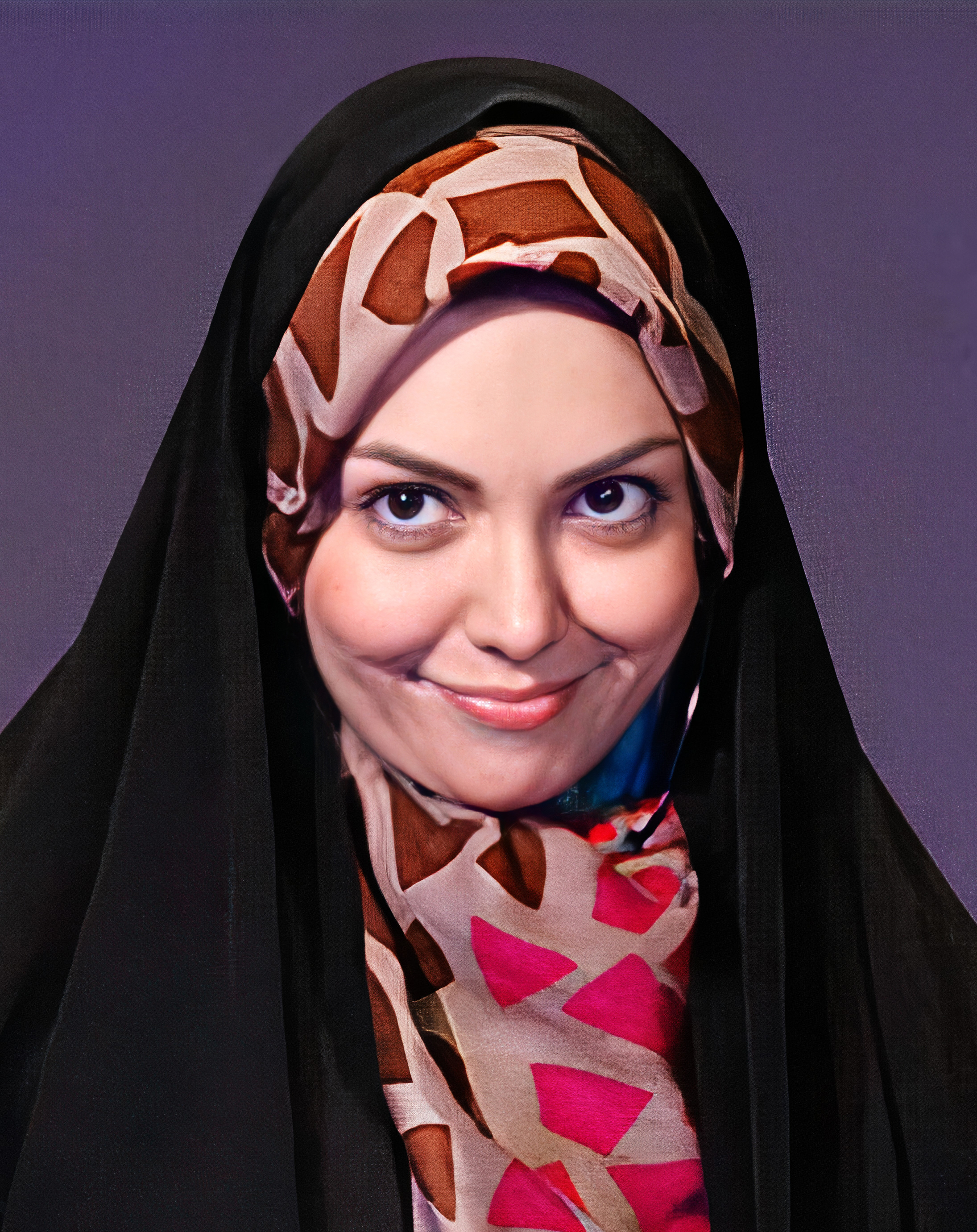
Azade Namdari

- Ebrahim Nabavi (2025), Iranian satirist, writer and diarist
- Mirosław Nahacz (2007), Polish novelist and screenwriter, hanging
- Azade Namdari (2021), Iranian television host
- Terry Newton (2010), English rugby league player, hanging
- Tom Nicon (2010), French model, jumped out of apartment window
- Ela Nikbayan (2021), Iranian transgender woman, self-immolation
- Jon Nödtveidt (2006), Swedish guitarist for the black metal band Dissection, gunshot
- Iván Noel (2021), French-Argentine film director and producer, potassium cyanide
- Bill Nojay (2016), American politician and member of the New York State Assembly, gunshot
- Mita Noor (2013), Bangladeshi actress, hanging
- Hisashi Nozawa (2004), Japanese writer, hanging

=== O ===
- Sean O'Haire (2014), American former WWE wrestler and MMA fighter, hanging
- Mălina Olinescu (2011), Romanian singer, jump from window
- Ambrose Olsen (2010), American model, hanging

=== P ===
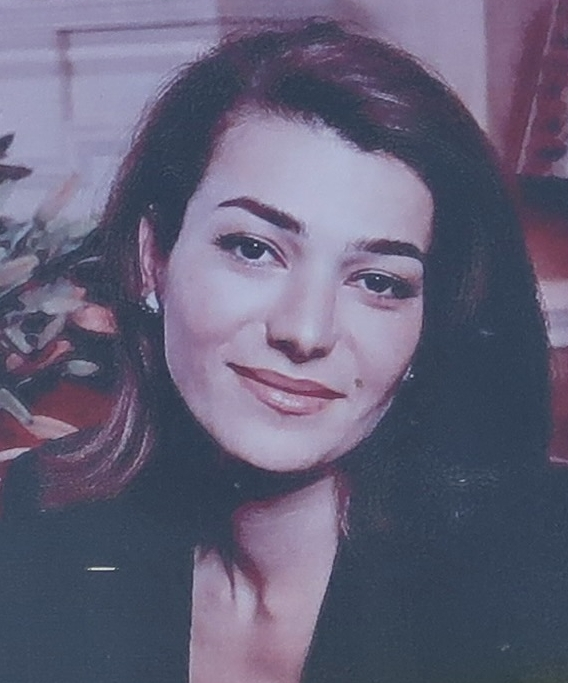
Leila Pahlavi

- Stephen Paddock (2017), American perpetrator of the 2017 Las Vegas shooting, gunshot
- Tommy Page (2017), American singer songwriter
- Ali-Reza Pahlavi (2011), son of Mohammad Reza Pahlavi, last Shah of Iran, gunshot
- Leila Pahlavi (2001), daughter of Mohammad Reza Pahlavi, last Shah of Iran, overdose of sleeping pills
- Sol Pais (2019), American student and suspect in FBI manhunt, gunshot
- Miko Palanca (2019), Filipino actor, jump from building
- Ryan Christopher Palmeter (2023), American mass shooter and terrorist, gunshot
- Brodie Panlock (2006), Australian bullying victim, jumped from the top of a multilevel carpark in Hawthorn
- Elaine Parent (2002), American con artist, identity thief and murderer, gunshot to the chest
- William Parente (2009), American real estate attorney, murdered his wife and two daughters, hanging
- Park Yong-ha (2010), South Korean actor and singer, hanging
- Park Won-soon (2020), South Korean activist, lawyer and Mayor of Seoul
- Rehtaeh Parsons (2013), Canadian high school student who was bullied at school and online after images of her alleged gang rape were distributed online by its perpetrators, hanging
- Darrin Patrick (2020), American author and pastor, gunshot
- Mark Pavelich (2021), American hockey player, asphyxia
- Jeret "Speedy" Peterson (2011), American skier, Olympic medalist, gunshot
- Lawrence Phillips (2016), American football player, hanged himself in his prison cell
- Jacques Picoux (2016), Gay French-language university lecturer in Taiwan, undisclosed method
- Justin Pierce (2000), English-born American actor and skateboarder known for his role in the 1995 drama Kids, hanging
- Ed Piskor (2024), American cartoonist and podcast host, died by suicide after accusations of sexual misconduct
- Kailia Posey (2022), American beauty pageant contestant and reality television personality, hanging.
- Audrie Pott (2012), American high school student, hanging
- Randy Potter (2017), American former missing person, gunshot
- Hayden Poulter (2018), New Zealand serial killer
- Josh Powell (2012), American main suspect in the disappearance of his wife, Susan, blew up his house with him and his children inside
- Slobodan Praljak (2017), Bosnian Croat director, general and war criminal, potassium cyanide
- Wolfgang Přiklopil (2006), Austrian kidnapper, jumping in front of moving train
- Phoebe Prince (2010), American high school student who was bullied at school and online, hanging
- Kushal Punjabi (2019), Indian actor, hanging

=== Q ===
- Qiao Renliang (2016), Chinese singer and actor, slit wrist
- Dara Quigley (2017), Irish journalist and blogger, who died by suicide while in a detainment cell

=== R ===
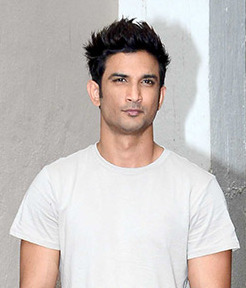
Sushant Singh Rajput

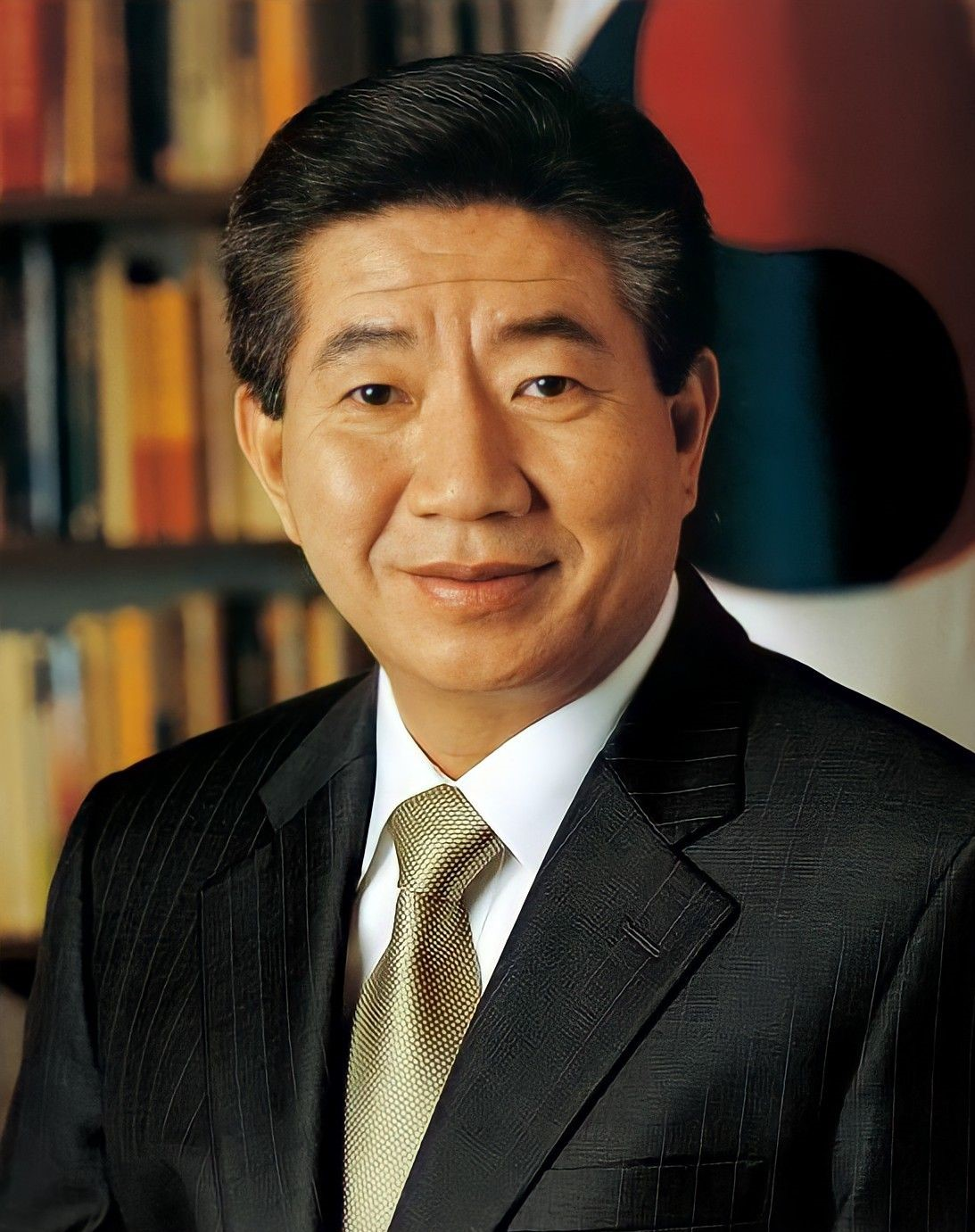
Roh Moo-hyun

- Mikayla Raines (2025), American animal rescuer and YouTuber, hanging
- Jason Raize (2004), American actor, singer and former goodwill ambassador for the United Nations Environment Programme, hanging
- Sushant Singh Rajput (2020), Indian actor, hanging
- František Rajtoral (2017), Czech soccer player, hanging
- Anil Ramdas (2012), Dutch writer and journalist, overdose
- James Ransone (2025), American actor, hanging
- Kodela Siva Prasada Rao (2019), Indian politician, hanging
- Nicola Ann Raphael (2001), Scottish bullied student, overdose of dextropropoxyphene
- Terry Ratzmann (2005), American mass murderer, gunshot
- Albert Razin (2019), Russian Udmurt language rights activist and sociologist, self-immolation
- Reckful (2020), Israeli-American Twitch streamer and Esports player
- Liam Rector (2007), American poet and educator, gunshot
- Brian Reimer (2002), killed himself with a shotgun
- David Reimer (2004), Canadian man who after a botched circumcision in infancy, was unsuccessfully reassigned as a girl until he learned the truth at age 13, gunshot
- Ren Hang (2017), Chinese photographer and poet
- Angelo Reyes (2011), Chief of Staff of the Armed Forces of the Philippines, gunshot
- John Rheinecker (2017), American Major League Baseball pitcher, hanging
- Artūras Rimkevičius (2019), Lithuanian footballer, gunshot
- Al Rio (2012), Brazilian comics artist, and animation director, hanging
- Peter Robbins (2022), American voice actor, voice of Charlie Brown
- Dale Roberts (2010), English footballer, hanging
- Charles Rocket (2005), American actor, cut throat
- Jamey Rodemeyer (2011), American bullied blogger and high school student, hanging
- Elliot Rodger (2014), American spree killer who perpetrated the 2014 Isla Vista killings, gunshot to the head
- Ricky Rodriguez (2005), son of cult leader David Berg, gunshot following his murder of Angela M. Smith
- Roh Moo-hyun (2009), ninth President of South Korea, jump from a cliff
- Jodon F. Romero (2012), American criminal whose suicide was broadcast on national television following a car chase in Arizona, gunshot
- Vladislav Roslyakov, 18-year-old student that committed the Kerch Polytechnic College massacre
- Conrad Roy (2014), American marine salvage captain, carbon monoxide poisoning, after his girlfriend urged him to commit suicide, for which she was convicted of involuntary manslaughter
- Himanshu Roy (2018), Indian police officer, gunshot
- Lori Erica Ruff (2010), American formerly unidentified identity thief, gunshot
- Natalie "Samantha" Rupnow (2024), American student that committed the 2024 Abundant Life Christian School shooting, gunshot
- Michael Ruppert (2014), American political activist, gunshot
- Richard Russell (2018), American airport ground operator and airplane thief, intentionally crashing the stolen airplane
- Stevie Ryan (2017), American actress and comedian, hanging
- Rick Rypien (2011), Canadian professional ice hockey player

=== S ===
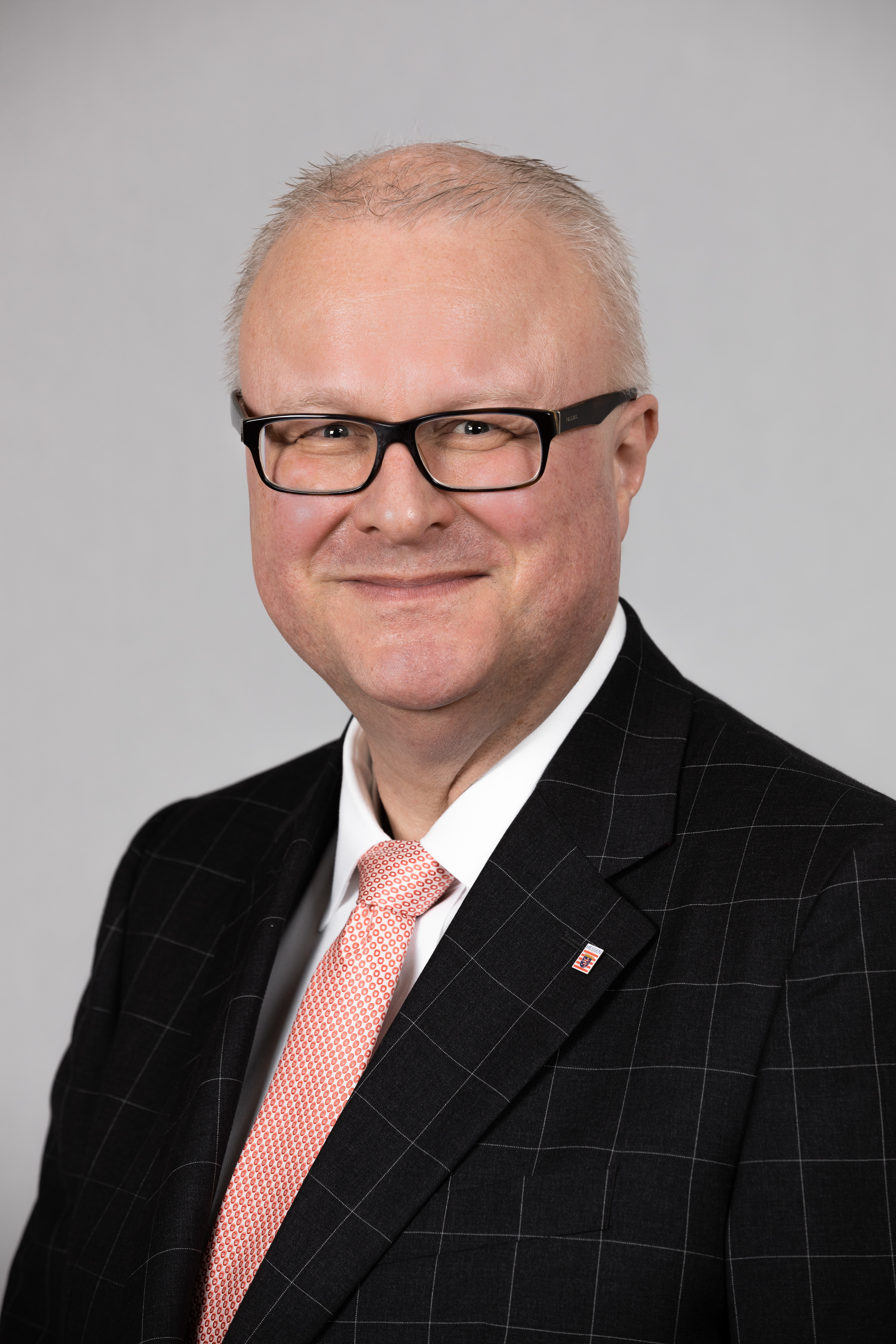
Thomas Schäfer

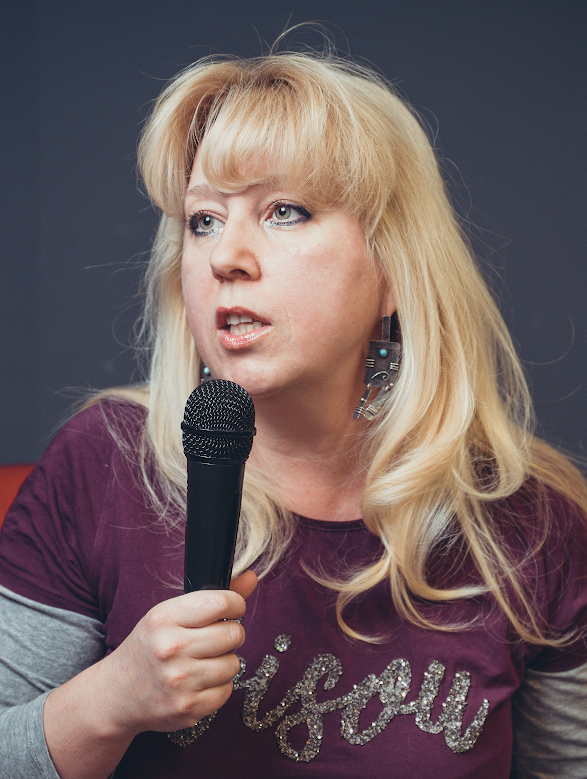
Irina Slavina

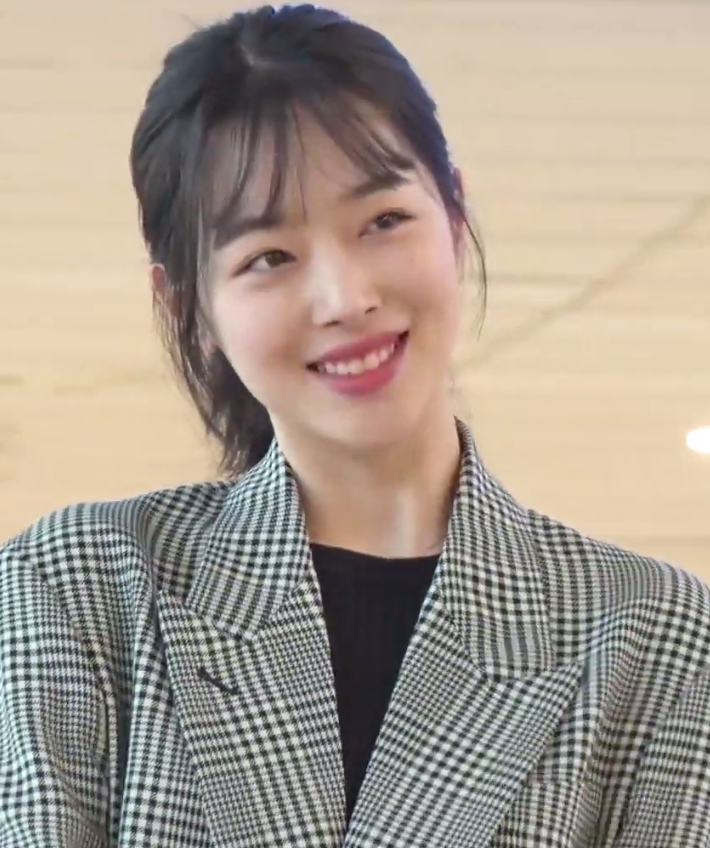
Sulli

- Jun Sadogawa (2013), Japanese manga artist, hanging.
- Marcelo Sajen (2004), Argentine serial rapist, gunshot.
- Rashaan Salaam (2016), American football player, gunshot wound to the head.
- Jacintha Saldanha (2012), Indian nurse, hanging
- Mark Salling (2018), American actor, hanging
- Johanna Sällström (2007), Swedish actress
- Kianush Sanjari (2024), Iranian journalist and activist, jump from a building
- Nick Santino (2012), American soap opera actor, overdosed on pills
- Vytautas Šapranauskas (2013), Lithuanian actor, hanging
- Carl Sargeant (2017), Welsh politician and former member of the Welsh Government, hanging
- Sam Sarpong (2015), British-born American model and actor, jump from a bridge
- Yoshiki Sasai (2014), Japanese biologist, hanging
- Drake Sather (2004), American screenwriter, gunshot
- V. P. Sathyan (2006), Indian footballer, jumped in front of a train
- Thomas Schäfer (2020), German politician, jumped in front of a train
- Andreas Schnieders (2022), German boxer
- Robert Schommer (2001), American astronomer
- Dave Schulthise (2004), American bass guitarist for The Dead Milkmen, overdose of pills
- Tom Schweich (2015), American politician, gunshot
- L'Wren Scott (2014), American fashion designer, hanging
- Tony Scott (2012), English film director of films such as Top Gun, jumped off the Vincent Thomas Bridge in Los Angeles
- Angela Scoular (2011), English actress, ingestion of drain cleaner
- Junior Seau (2012), American football All-Pro player, gunshot to the chest
- Rebecca Ann Sedwick (2013), American middle schooler, jumping off a silo
- Oksana Shachko (2018), Ukrainian artist and activist, cofounder of FEMEN, hanging
- Bilal Shahwani (2026), Baloch militant, 2026 Quetta suicide attack
- Anitha Shanmugam (2017), Indian Tamil student, hanging
- Samir Sharma (2020), Indian actor, hanging
- Harold Shipman (2004), English family doctor and serial killer, hanging
- Ibrahim Shkupolli (2009), Kosovar-Albanian immigrant to Finland, gunshot
- V. G. Siddhartha (2019), Indian businessman, drowning
- Tiffany Simelane (2009), Swazi beauty queen, ingestion of weevil tablet
- Chris Simon (2024), Retired professional hockey player
- Narender Singh (2016), Indian judoka, hanging
- PC Siqueira (2023), Brazilian Internet and television personality, hanging
- Irina Slavina (2020), Russian journalist, self-immolation
- Smiley Culture (2011), English reggae singer and DJ, stabbing
- Lia Smith (2025), American college athlete
- David Sonboly (2016), Iranian-German perpetrator of the 2016 Munich shooting, gunshot
- Song Jae-rim (2024), South Korean actor and model
- Peu Sousa (2013), Brazilian guitarist for Nove Mil Anjos and Pitty, hanging
- Ellie Soutter (2018), British snowboarder, hanging
- Kate Spade (2018), American fashion designer, hanging
- Bill Sparkman (2009), American teacher, asphyxia
- Mark Speight (2008), English television presenter, hanging
- Shannon Spruill, aka Daffney (2021), American professional wrestler, gunshot wound to chest
- Andrew Joseph Stack III (2010), American embedded software consultant, plane crash
- Randy Stair (2017), American mass murderer, perpetrator of the Eaton Township Weis Markets shooting, gunshot
- Scott Stearney (2018), United States Navy admiral, gunshot
- Costică Ștefănescu (2013), Romanian footballer and manager, jump from the fifth floor of the Military Hospital in Bucharest
- Jean Stein (2017), American author, jump from a New York City high rise
- Steve Stephens (2017), American vocational specialist and murder suspect, gunshot after police pursuit
- Jon Paul Steuer (2018), American actor and musician, known as the first actor to play the Star Trek character Alexander Rozhenko, gunshot
- Brody Stevens (2019), American stand-up comedian and actor, hanging
- Lyle Stevik (2001), formerly unidentified man using the alias name taken from a book by Joyce Carol Oates, hanging
- Deon Stewardson (2017), British-South African actor
- Gary Stewart (2003), American country music singer, gunshot to the neck
- Trevor Strnad (2022), American musician and vocalist, method undisclosed.
- Sulli (2019), South Korean actress, singer, and model, hanging
- Adam Svoboda (2019), Czech ice hockey goaltender and coach, hanging
- Aaron Swartz (2013), American computer programmer, writer, political organizer and activist, hanging
- Larry Sweeney (2011), American professional wrestler, hanging
- Sawyer Sweeten (2015), American former child actor (Everybody Loves Raymond), gunshot

=== T ===
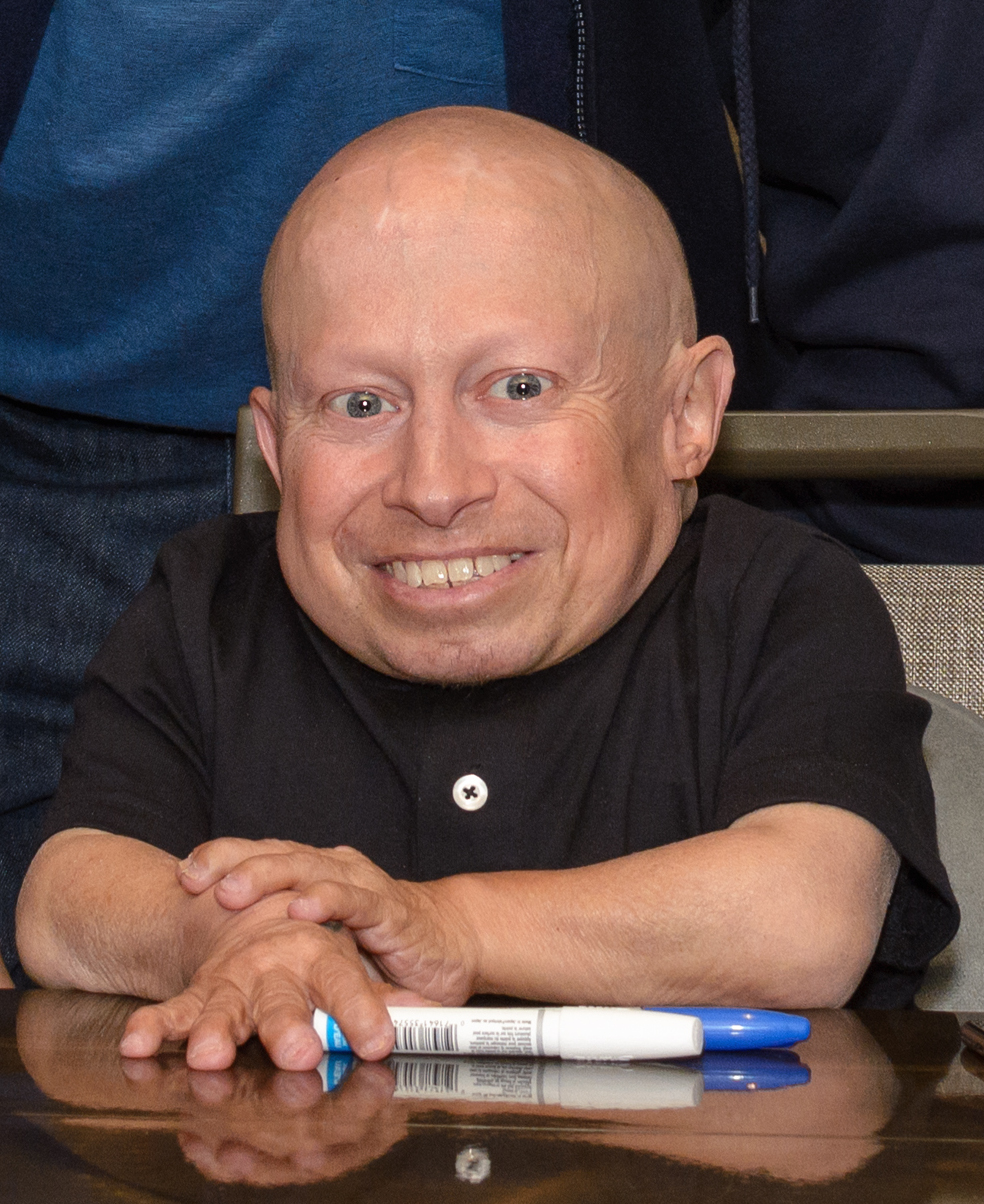
Verne Troyer

- Payal Tadvi (2019), Indian college student, undisclosed method
- Yūko Takeuchi (2020), Japanese actress, hanging
- Wayne Kent Taylor (2021), American entrepreneur and founder of Texas Roadhouse
- Seth Teller (2014), American computer scientist, jumped from Tobin Bridge
- Stella Tennant (2020), British model
- Mike Thalassitis (2019), English-Cypriot footballer and television personality, hanging
- Hunter S. Thompson (2005), American gonzo journalist, author of Fear and Loathing in Las Vegas, gunshot
- Terry Thompson (2011), American zookeeper and owner of Muskingum County Animal Farm, gunshot
- Graham Thorpe (2024), English cricketer, hit by a train
- Jānis Timma (2024), Latvian basketball player, asphyxiation
- Amanda Todd (2012), Canadian high school student who was bullied at school and online, hanging
- Ivo-Valentino Tomaš (2019), Croatian football player
- Dudu Topaz (2009), Israeli TV personality and entertainer, hanging while incarcerated in jail
- Maury Travis (2002), American serial killer, hanging
- Dick Trickle (2013), American NASCAR driver, gunshot
- Sunil Tripathi (2013), American student and former suspect in the Boston Marathon bombing
- Verne Troyer (2018), American actor known for his role as Mini-Me in the Austin Powers films, alcohol intoxication
- Butch Trucks (2017), American drummer for the Allman Brothers Band, gunshot
- Houston Tumlin (2021), American child actor and soldier, gunshot

=== U ===
- Miyu Uehara (2011), Japanese model, hanging
- Tyrone Unsworth (2016), Australian bullying victim, undisclosed method
- Andrew Urdiales (2018), American serial killer, hanging

=== V ===
- Cherry Valentine (2022), English drag queen, hanging
- Edwin Valero (2010), Venezuelan boxer, hanging
- Armando Vega Gil (2019), hanging
- Brian Velasco (2019), Filipino drummer, jumped from balcony
- Dominique Venner (2013), French author, gunshot to the head in the Notre Dame de Paris
- Dan Vickerman (2017), Former Australian Rugby Union player
- Sladjana Vidovic (2008), Croatian-American high school student, hanging
- Norah Vincent (2022), American journalist and novelist, assisted suicide
- Ned Vizzini (2013), American author of young adult fiction such as the novel It's Kind of a Funny Story, leapt from a building
- Bulelani Vukwana (2002), South African spree killer, gunshot

=== W ===
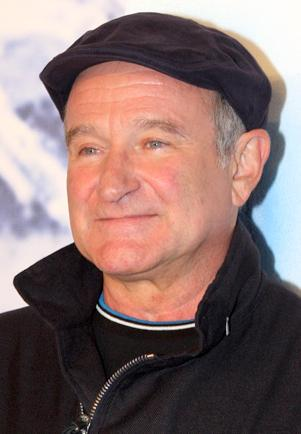
Robin Williams

- Bradford Thomas Wagner (2005), American real estate agent, pornographic film actor and suspected serial rapist, hanging himself with a bed sheet
- David Foster Wallace (2008), American author, hanging
- Andre Waters (2006), former NFL safety, gunshot to the head
- Gary Webb (2004), American investigative reporter, gunshot to the head
- Jeff Weise (2005), American high school student who perpetrated the Red Lake shootings, gunshot
- Kenneth Weishuhn (2012), American high school student, hanging.
- Bob Welch (2012), American rock singer-songwriter and former member of Fleetwood Mac, gunshot to the chest
- Vince Welnick (2006), American singer-songwriter and keyboardist for The Tubes, slit throat
- Dawn-Marie Wesley (2000), Canadian bullied high school student, hanging
- Kevin Whitrick (2007), British electrical engineer, livestreamed hanging
- Chad Williams (2026), American mass shooter that committed the 2026 Twin Falls shooting, gunshot to the head
- Robin Williams (2014), American comedian and actor, hanging
- Jarrid Wilson (2019), American pastor and author
- Lamarr Wilson (2025), American technology journalist and YouTuber
- Robin Windsor (2024), English professional dancer
- Jack Wishna (2012), president and CEO of CPAmerica, carbon monoxide poisoning
- Jiverly Antares Wong (2009), naturalized American citizen from Vietnam who perpetrated the Binghamton shooting, gunshot
- Tobi Wong (2010), Canadian born designer, and conceptual artist, overdosed on pills
- Seung-yeon Woo (2009), South Korean actress and model, hanging
- Stephen Wooldridge (2017), Australian cyclist
- Tera Wray (2016), American pornographic actress
- Evan Wright (2024), American journalist and writer (Generation Kill), firearm.
- Marcin Wrona (2015), Polish film director, hanging

=== Y ===
- Yang Yang (2019), Chinese tenor, jump from the 26th floor of his apartment building
- Yasmine (2009), Belgian singer, hanging
- Patchat Yimruang (2026), Thai mass shooter that committed Debsirin Nonthaburi school shooting
- Yoñlu (2006), Brazilian singer-songwriter, carbon monoxide poisoning
- Yoon Ki-won (2011), South Korean football goalkeeper, charcoal-burning suicide
- Atsumi Yoshikubo (2014), Japanese psychiatrist, intentionally getting lost in the Canadian Taiga
- Lee Thompson Young (2013), American actor, gunshot
- Fakhra Younus (2012), Pakistani dancer, jumped from building

=== Z ===
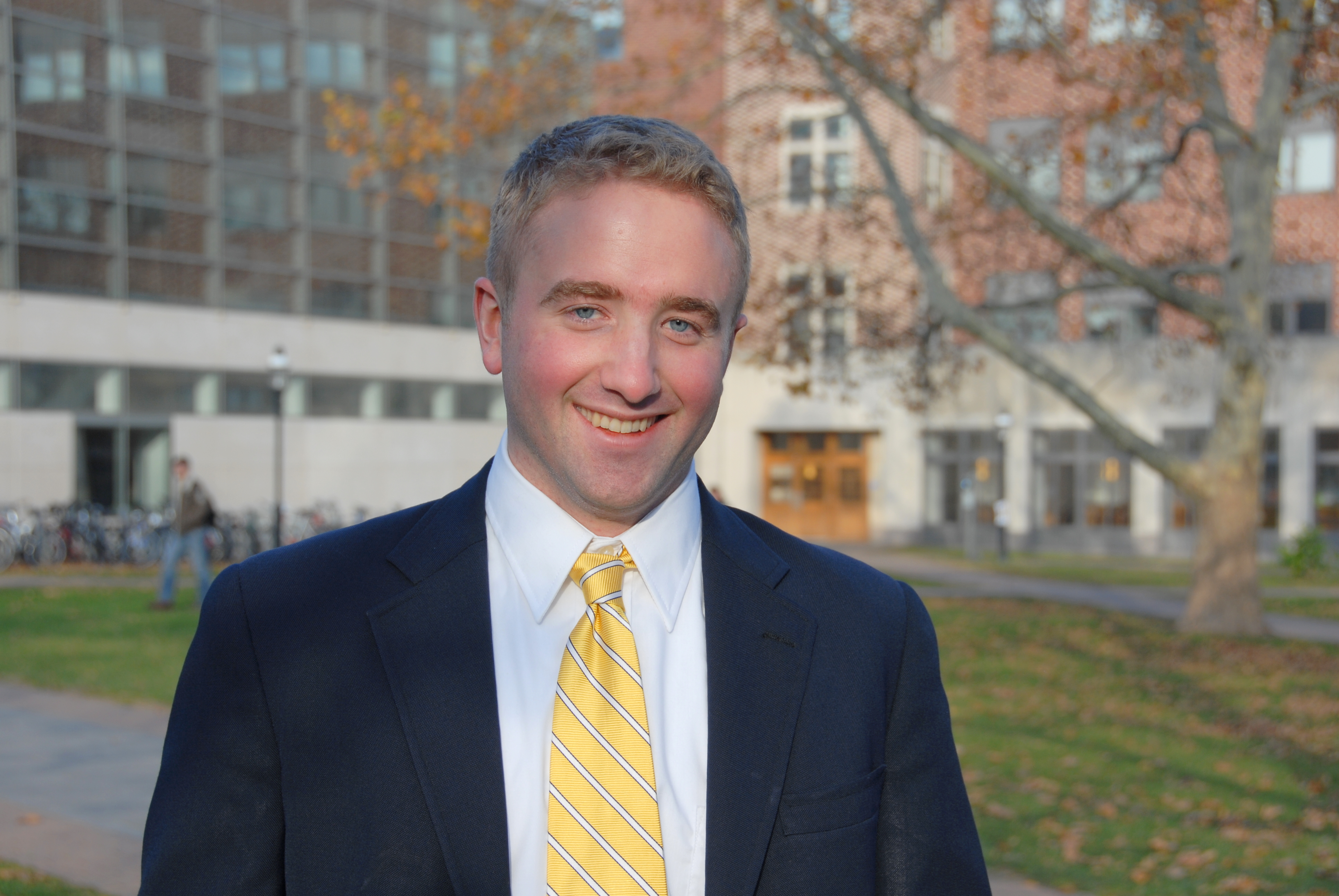
Bill Zeller

- Bill Zeller (2011), American computer programmer and developer of myTunes, oxygen deprivation due to hanging led to brain damage, taken off life support
- Joost Zwagerman (2015), Dutch writer, poet, and essayist

== Possible or disputed ==
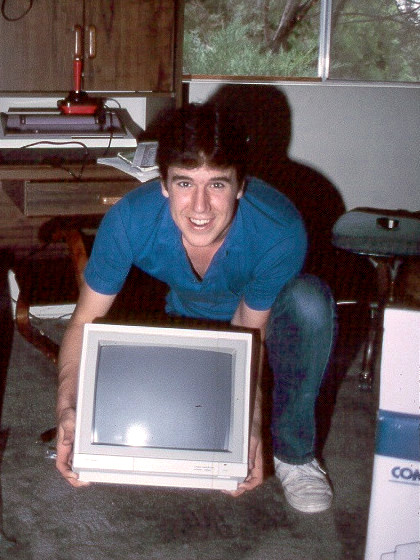
Terry A. Davis

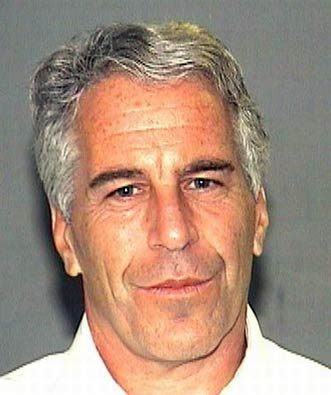
Jeffrey Epstein

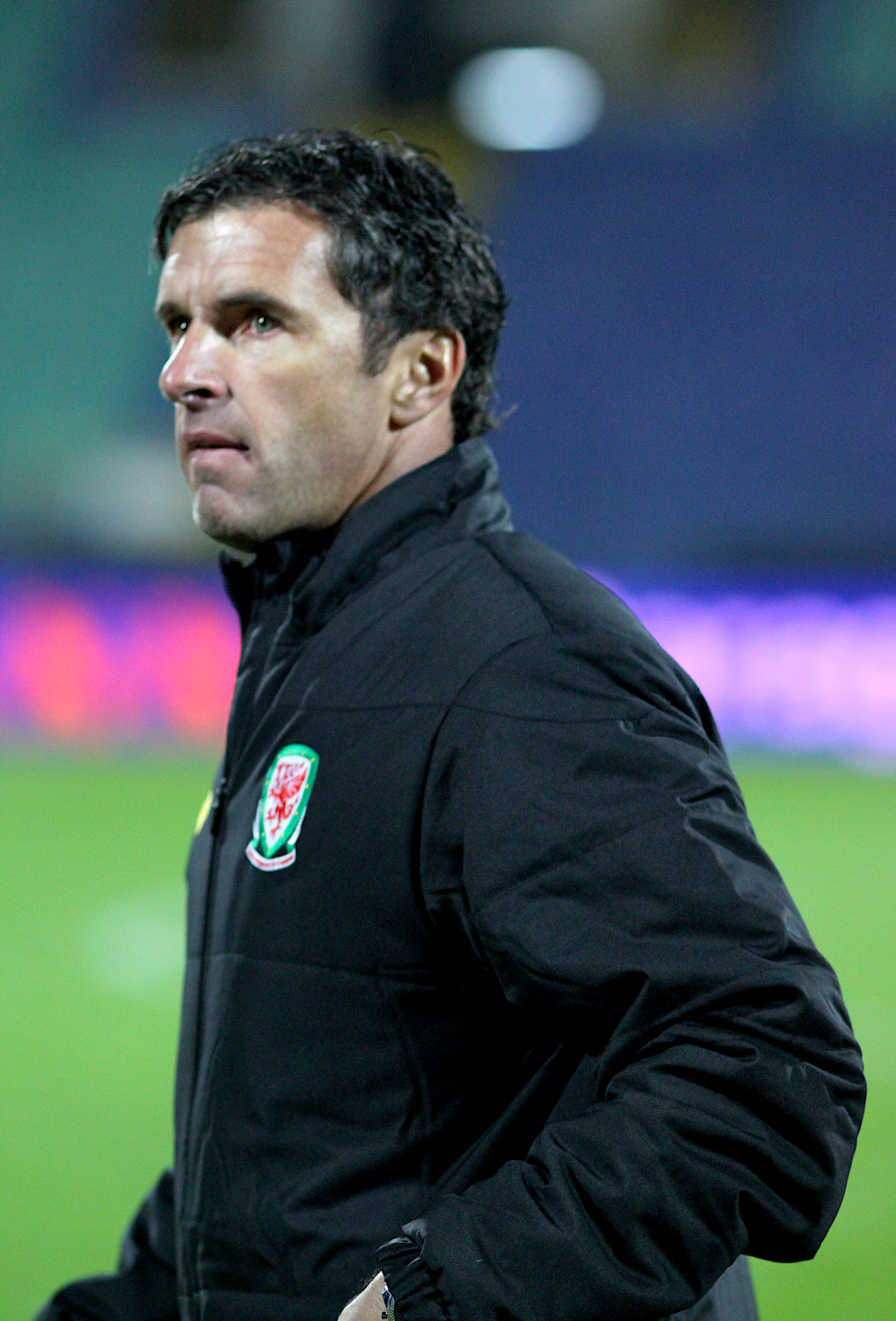
Gary Speed

- Suchir Balaji (2024), American artificial intelligence researcher who died several weeks after making accusations against his ex-employer, OpenAI. Both the San Francisco police and the Chief Medical Examiner concluded that his death was a suicide. Balaji's family insist that he was killed.
- Terry A. Davis (2018), American programmer and creator of TempleOS, struck by a train
- Jeffrey Epstein (2019), American financier and convicted sex offender, hanging. Whether Epstein's death was suicide or homicide is a point of controversy.
- Lolo Ferrari (2000), French pornographic actress, dancer, singer, and Guinness World Record holder, antidepressant and heroin overdose. Ferrari had been depressed, and while her death was ruled a suicide, it is speculated that her husband killed her. After it was found that mechanically induced suffocation could not be ruled out, her husband was arrested. He was released from prison after 13 months, after a second autopsy was performed.
- Rick Genest (2018), performance artist, actor and model, fall from a balcony
- Petri Gerdt (2002), Finnish chemical engineering student, explosion. It is uncertain whether Gerdt wanted to kill anyone with his bomb.
- Ricky Hatton (2025), British professional boxer, hanging
- Kizito Mihigo (2020), Rwandan gospel singer, genocide survivor and peace activist, hanging. Human rights organisations and Rwandan activists challenged this.
- Liam Payne (2024), member of the boyband One Direction. Died by falling of the 3rd floor balcony of a hotel. He might have been under the influence of alcohol or drugs. It is unsure whether he fell or jumped. Autopsy revealed he did not protect himself while falling.
- Bernardo Sassetti (2012), Portuguese jazz pianist and film composer, fell or jumped off a cliff to the sea (a nearby fisherman said he saw him jump).
- Elliott Smith (2003), American singer, songwriter and musician, stab wounds to chest. While Smith's death was originally reported as a suicide, the official autopsy report released in December 2003 left open the question of homicide.
- Gary Speed (2011), Welsh footballer and manager, hanging
- Steve Stevaert (2015), Belgian politician, drowning
- Ronaldo Valdez (2023), Filipino actor, gunshot
- Jeffrey "JV" Vandergrift (2023), DJ and radio show host, body found in San Francisco bay following long battle with Lyme disease. Suicide suspected.

== See also ==
- List of suicides
- List of suicides (BC)
- List of suicides (1–999 AD)
- List of suicides (1000–1899)
- List of suicides (1900–1999)
- List of deaths from drug overdose and intoxication
