= Suicide of Nicole Chan =

2019 death of Canadian police officer

Nicole Chan was a Vancouver Police Department officer who died by suicide in 2019. Chan made allegations of being the victim of sexual coercion from supervising officers prior to her death.

== Background ==
In late 2018, Chan filed a claim with the British Columbia statutory body WorkSafeBC that alleged she was a victim of sexual coercion from two supervising officers in 2017. She was on stress leave from work for three weeks prior to her death. Her colleagues told the inquest into her death that she had been the target of gossip and worked in a "toxic workplace environment". Testimony stated that she submitted complaints about two senior officers, one of which included an allegation of sexual assault.

== Death ==
Chan died by suicidal strangulation on the morning of January 27, 2019. She had been released from Vancouver General Hospital the previous evening after being taken to hospital under British Columbia's Mental Health Act, after threatening suicide. After her release from hospital, she expressed dissatisfaction that police human resources staff had gone to the hospital.

Her body was discovered by her boyfriend in her apartment.

== Aftermath ==
After a 2019 police investigation, one of her supervising officers was dismissed by the police force for discreditable conduct; the police force did not hold a public hearing into the dismissal. Her family launched litigation against the police force, Chan's supervisor and the City of Vancouver in January 2022.

During the 2023 British Columbia coroners inquest into her death, the legal representative of the Chan family shared the allegations of sexual coercion. At the end of the coroner's inquest, the jury made twelve recommendations, including "better communication between community health care providers, police and paramedics and the hospital physician treating a patient with a mental health emergency", as well as improvements to Vancouver Police training.

== See also ==
- Police officer safety and health
- List of suicides attributed to bullying
- List of suicides in the 21st century
