= CPAConnect =

Association of accountants

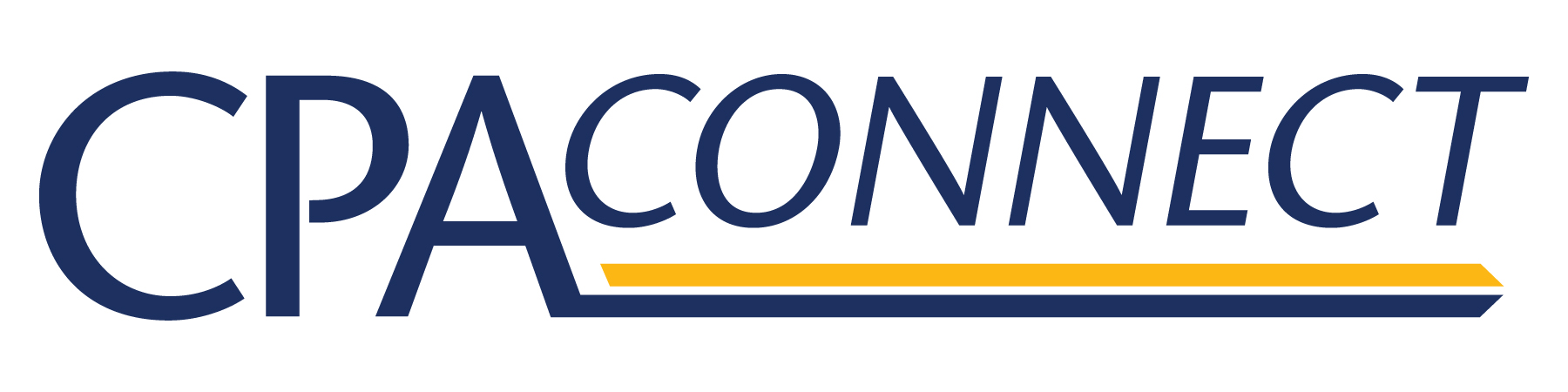
- Company type: Affiliate Association
- Industry: Accounting
- Founded: 1994; 32 years ago
- Founder: CPAmerica
- Headquarters: Gainesville, Florida, United States
- Area served: United States, Puerto Rico and Mexico
- Key people: Erin Anker (Chair, 2018)
- Products: Professional services
- Revenue: $155 million
- Owner: Crowe Global
- Number of employees: 1,650 through member organizations
- Parent: CPAmerica International
- Website: www.cpaconnect.com

CPAConnect is an American affiliate association of CPAmerica International made up of small, independent Certified Public Accountant (CPA) firms and sole practitioners in the United States, Puerto Rico and Mexico.

CPAConnect is an alliance of CPAmerica, Inc., one of the nation’s largest associations of major independent CPA firms. Both associations operate out of CPAmerica’s headquarters building in Gainesville, Florida.

Average member firm size is seven employees, which includes two partners.

== History ==
Founded in 1994, CPAConnect was created by its parent association, CPAmerica. Within a year, membership had grown to 60 firms. By 2004, membership had expanded to include more than 150 firms and, by 2015, nearly 200 firms.

By 2006, The total number of employees in member firms nationwide surpasses 1,650.

== Services ==
CPAConnect provides to its members practice management advice, CPE training, marketing products and access to national consultants. They share knowledge and information through e-mail discussion lists, conference calls, an online sharing library, an annual CPAConnect conference and other conferences with CPAmerica members.
