= Suicide of Antonio Calvo =

Death of a Princeton University lecturer

Antonio Calvo
- Born: 18 May 1965
- Died: 12 April 2011 (aged 45); Princeton University
- Employer: Princeton University

Antonio Calvo (18 May 1965 – 12 April 2011) was a senior lecturer in Spanish at Princeton University who died by suicide in April 2011 after learning either that he had been suspended from his job or that his employment contract had been abruptly terminated by Princeton. The cause of death, as determined by the New York City medical examiner's office, was "slash wounds" to his neck and arm. The cancellation of his employment contract would have meant that Calvo—a Spanish citizen—would lose his residence visa in the US and face deportation.

== Background ==
Calvo's death has provoked questions regarding why employment was interrupted during the middle of the academic semester. According to an acquaintance of Calvo, on 8 April, a security guard reportedly forcibly removed him from his office and took his keys, and the university barred access to his email account. Later that day, students waited in vain for him to arrive to a class he was meant to teach.

Calvo, who also taught linguistics, poetics and the arts of the Harlem Renaissance, was being evaluated for reappointment (he did not have academic tenure), and his department had recommended that he be retained. A colleague told the New York Times that a number of graduate students and a fellow lecturer had mounted a campaign to block his renewal, on the basis of comments alleged to be harsh and inappropriate. An entry in Calvo's notebook from 9 April referred to concerns about his having "raised [his] voice to subordinates"; Calvo had supervised the work of graduate student instructors who in his view sometimes did not work hard enough. Colleagues and students told the New York Times that Calvo sometimes used Spanish expressions that might have been offensive to people who did not understand their connotation in Spanish culture. A letter from his department chair told him he would receive a call from an associate dean to schedule a meeting at which the allegations would be discussed.

The university administration, in a statement by president Shirley Tilghman, has declined to answer questions or provide details about the reason for the termination, alleging reasons of confidentiality, and members of Calvo's department have allegedly been instructed not to speak about it (an allegation disputed by the university), leading to dissatisfaction among some groups on campus, particularly among those undergraduates who revered him. Friends of Calvo have alleged that the administration is "hiding something" and refer to "vicious politics".

Writers in Spain have observed that Calvo's story bears similarities to a number of academic novels, including Philip Roth's The Human Stain.
