= Interstate 80 rock throwing =

2014 criminal incident in Pennsylvania, U.S.

Interstate 80 rock throwing incident
- Location: Union County, Pennsylvania, United States
- Date: July 10, 2014; 12 years ago
- Attack type: Assault by stone throwing
- Weapon: Rock
- Injuries: Sharon Budd
- Perpetrators: Keefer McGee; Tyler Porter; Dylan Lahr; Brett Lahr
- Motive: Thrill
- Verdict: Brett, Porter: Pleaded no contest McGee, Dylan: Pleaded guilty
- Convictions: Dylan, McGee: Aggravated assault (2 counts for Dylan; 1 count for McGee); Brett, Porter: Conspiracy to commit aggravated assault
- Sentence: Brett: 1 1/2 to 20 years in prison Dylan: 4 1/2 to 20 years in prison plus 13 years probation Porter: 22 months to 10 years in prison plus 10 years probation McGee: 11 1/2 to 23 months in jail plus 8 years probation

On July 10, 2014, four teenagers who were throwing rocks from an overpass above Interstate 80 (I-80) in Union County, Pennsylvania, critically injured and permanently disfigured a passenger in a car on the highway. The high-profile rock-throwing case received significant media attention.

== Attack on Sharon Budd ==
Sharon Budd, a 53-year-old schoolteacher from Uniontown, Ohio, was a passenger in a car being driven east on I-80 in Pennsylvania by her daughter on July 10, 2014, when a rock smashed through the windshield of her car, hitting her directly in the face. Budd suffered catastrophic injuries, including blinding of one eye. Budd's husband Randy, who was sitting in the back seat while the couple's daughter Kaylee drove, testified that when the rock hit the car it sounded like "an explosion". Matthew Baker, of Plainville, Massachusetts, who was driving a tractor-trailer truck, told police that a rock thrown from the overpass had hit his truck just before the rock struck the car in which Budd was riding.

Keefer McGee, Tyler Porter, and brothers Dylan and Brett Lahr, all aged 17 or 18, of New Columbia, Pennsylvania, were reportedly on a "troublemaking spree" late on July 10, 2014, when they began throwing rocks from an overpass at cars moving along I-80. McGee told police that the group had specifically planned to smash mailboxes with baseball bats and throw rocks at parked cars. They had stolen steaks from a grocery store, driven through a field of corn (damaging the crop), broken the windows of a house with a baseball bat, and stopped at a farm to pick up rocks to throw, before proceeding to the highway overpass. Dylan Lahr was identified as the person who threw the rock that hit the Budds' car. McGee was arraigned on charges of "aggravated assault, criminal trespass, propulsion of missiles into an occupied vehicle or onto a roadway, agricultural vandalism and recklessly endangering," on August 5, 2014. All four were charged with "aggravated assault, conspiracy, recklessly endangering, propelling missiles into vehicle, agricultural vandalism and possession of instruments of crime".

According to McGee, after hitting the car with the rock, the boys cheered. McGee told the court: "We were all laughing thinking it was funny. We laughed, tossed out rocks, and drove home." They drove to the Lahrs' house where they began to watch a movie, but got back into the car and returned to the scene of the crime twice that night. On one of those trips, police noted the license plate number.

== Legal proceedings ==
Motions in the case were set to be heard April 30, 2015.

The three younger boys moved to have their cases moved to juvenile court. On April 30, 2015, Judge Michael Sholley ruled the three would be tried as adults, with the possibility of being sentenced for up to 25 years.

Tyler Porter, 17 at the time of the incident, pled no contest to a charge of conspiracy to commit aggravated assault.

An editorial in the Sunbury newspaper The Daily Item objected to the decision of judge Michael Sholley to bar the victim and the public from his courtroom during a pre-trial hearing about permissible evidence scheduled for late April 2015, calling the decision inimical to an "open and transparent" judicial process.

Defense attorneys have challenged the prosecution's claim that the rock was a "deadly weapon", claiming that it was merely a "delinquent act" unless the prosecution could demonstrate intent to produce death or serious bodily injury.

Nineteen-year-old Brett Lahr was sentenced to a prison sentence of between 18 months to 24 months. Tyler Porter, Dylan Lahr and Keefer McGee were sentenced to serve 22 months to 10 years, 54 months to 24 years, and 11 1/2 months to 23 months, respectively. Lahr was sentenced to an additional year in prison for violating his parole.

== Death of Randy Budd ==
On August 6, 2016, Randy Budd died by suicide. After the Interstate 80 rock throwing incident severely injured his wife, Budd had advocated for the Ohio Department of Transportation to install protective fencing on bridge overpasses.
