= CPAmerica International =

American association of independent certified public accountants

CPAmerica, Inc.
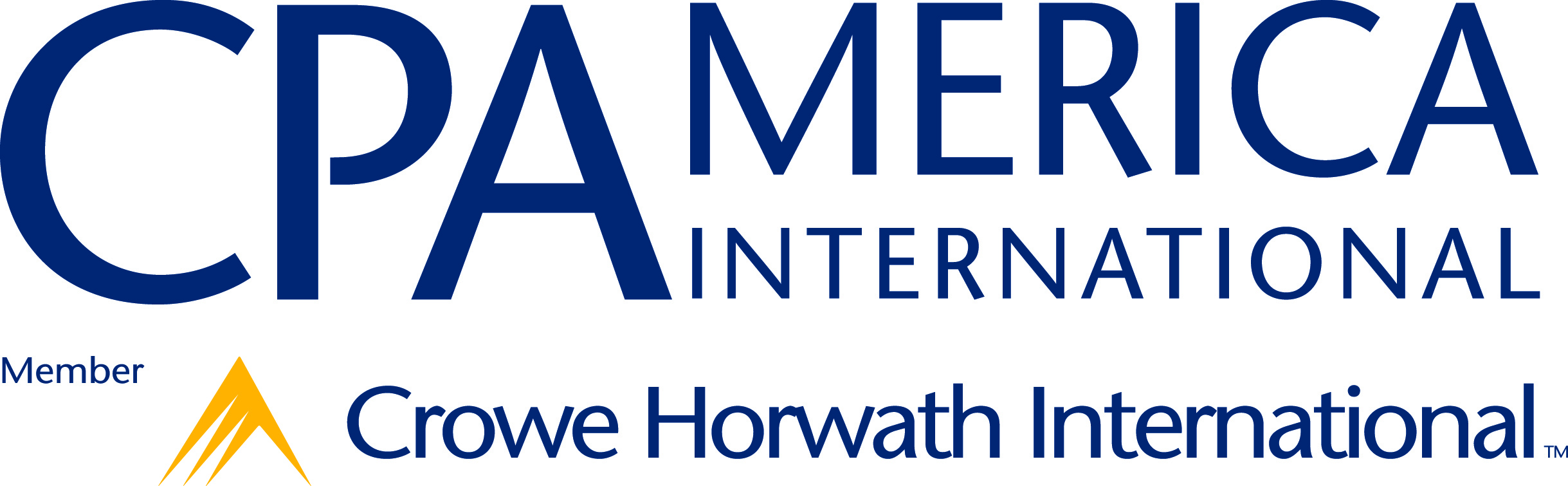
- Type: Association
- Industry: Accounting
- Predecessor: Accounting Firms Associated, Inc.
- Founded: 1978
- Headquarters: Gainesville, Florida
- Products: Professional services
- Revenue: $9.8 million
- Number of employees: 3,900
- Website: www.cpamerica.org

CPAmerica, Inc. is one of the largest associations of independent Certified Public Accountant (CPA) firms in the United States. It includes more than 90 firms with almost 170 offices in 40 states. The total staff is more than 3,900 employees, which includes more than 690 partners. Member firms vary in size from $2 million to $50 million in firm revenues, averaging $9.8 million. The number of personnel ranges from 15 to 325.

Only one member is accepted to the association in each 50-mile (80 km) radius except for a few major cities. Member firms receive practice management suggestions, information sharing between firms, continuing professional education, marketing products and access to national consultants. They communicate via discussion lists, conference calls, an online sharing library and regular nationwide conferences and regional meetings.

CPAmerica is a member of Crowe Global. The international network includes 782 offices worldwide with almost 40,000 employees.

== History ==
The association was founded in 1978 by eight firms as Accounting Firms Associated, Inc., and its headquarters was later established in Gainesville, Florida. By 1990, it included 43 firms. In 1998, with 60 members, it formed a strategic alliance with Crowe Horwath International (now known as Crowe Global). The name was changed to CPAmerica International in 2000. The following year, it moved into a 16,000-square-foot (1,500 m^{2}) headquarters building in Alachua, Florida. In 2012, the headquarters moved again to downtown Gainesville. In 2018, the name changed to CPAmerica, Inc.

== Affiliates ==
Crowe Global, an international group with headquarters in New York City, has worldwide membership that expands to over 200 independent accounting and advisory firms in 130 countries, and has a combined firm revenue of $4.3 billion.

CPAConnect was established by CPAmerica in 1994 as an alliance made up of smaller firms and sole practitioners. It has nearly 175 members in almost 40 states, Puerto Rico and Mexico. Total revenue of all member firms is approximately $155 million, and average size is seven employees, which includes two partners.
