= Maggy Biskupski =

French policer officer and president of MPC (1982-2018)

Maggy Mélanie Biskupski
- Born: 3 February 1982; Charleville-Mezieres, Ardennes, France
- Died: 12 November 2018 (aged 36); Carrières-sous-Poissy, Yvelines, France
- Occupations: Police Officer, Activist, Spokesperson, Whistleblower

Maggy Mélanie Biskupski was a French police officer and president of Mobilisation des policiers en colère (Movement of Angry Police Officers) focused on drawing attention to anti-cop hate and eradicating rising cases of suicides among French police officers often attributed to harsh service conditions. She was found dead in her apartment in a suspected case of suicide in 2018.

== Career ==
Maggy Biskupski and her colleague Guillaume Lebeau co-founded Movement of Angry Police Officers (MPC) in 2016 after a Molotov cocktail attack on four officers. Two of the officers were seriously injured, sparking police protest against safety concerns. Biskupski was named president of the MPC and was vocal in its campaign, frequently appearing in the media highlighting the anti-cop hate, violence against police officers, working conditions and high suicide rate among the police personnel. As the MPC's campaign gained national attention, it became the leading voice for police officers, especially the rank and files who felt underrepresented by the existing police unions. Biskupski was investigated by the police authority because of her activism but remained the president of the group.

== Death ==
Biskupski was found dead in her apartment with gunshot wounds suspected to have committed suicide with her service rifle.
