= Cyberbullying legislation =

Cyberbullying is a relatively recent phenomenon; many nations and territories have proposed legislation to address the practice because traditional laws against Harassment or assault are not applicable to online behavior. Cyberbullying is a form of bullying or harassment using electronic means. Newsworthy incidents caused by cyberbullying, including several suicides, have inspired calls for legislators to pass statutes to penalize the perpetrators, though most such proposed laws are often impeded by free speech challenges and other concerns about governmental overreach.

== Legislation by country ==
=== Australia ===
The Australian government has proposed specific cyberbullying laws to protect children. In the meantime, some of the nation's existing criminal statutes provide penalties for harassment and threats via telecommunications services. The Family Law Act 1975 protects individuals from harassment, including harassment that occurs via electronic communications. However, this is limited to the victims of family violence.

=== Canada ===
Canada has illegalized cyberbullying, with penalties for perpetrators including seizure of communications devices and jail time, while victims can sue perpetrators for damages. Under the Education Act, perpetrators can also be expelled from school, as with previous types of bullying and harasssment.

=== India ===
India does not have precise cyberbullying statutes, but the Information Technology Act includes penalties for offensive, insulting, or annoying communication through digital means.

=== New Zealand ===
New Zealand Minister of Justice Judith Collins introduced a law that would make it an offence to incite people to commit suicide, or to post material that is grossly offensive. The resulting Harmful Digital Communications Act was passed into law in 2015.

=== United Kingdom ===
The UK does not have precise cyberbullying statutes, but several existing statutes can be applied to the phenomenon. The Public Order Act 1986 makes it a crime to threaten, insult, or abuse someone through words or behaviour, in a written or visual manner. The Malicious Communications Act 1988 and the Communications Act 2003 cover offensive or indecent messages that are sent with the aim of causing distress or anxiety or threatening someone. The police are also authorized to take action against perpetrators. The Online Safety Act 2023 added stronger protections for children.

=== United States ===
American law makes little distinction between cyberbullying and cyberstalking; the latter is typically used when the victim is an adult but there are few differences in legal remedies for children vs. adults.

Despite many calls to fully illegalize cyberbullying among American citizens and legislators, proposed statutes are often restricted by the First Amendment as unacceptable government overreach into personal expression, even if that expression is abusive. Organizations such as the American Civil Liberties Union have taken the view that cyberbullying is an overly expansive term, and that the First Amendment protects all speech, even speech that is reprehensible. In general, such organizations argue that while the need for legislation against cyberbullying may exist, legislators must take a cautious, reasoned approach to enacting laws, and not rush into creating laws that would curtail speech too much.

True threats are not protected in American law, but courts have been inconsistent on whether that term applies to online harassment in which no specific threat has been made against the victim's safety. American law enforcement officials have tried to use pre-existing statutes on computer fraud to prosecute cyberbullies, such as in United States v. Lori Drew; or privacy law if the bullying included the disclosure of the victim's private life, as in the case of Tyler Clementi; but these remedies were found to be insufficient due to the original goals of such statutes.

==== Federal legislation ====
There have been few attempts at federal cyberbullying legislation in the United States, because most criminal law is handled internally by states. The federal government can only enforce such penalties against institutions that receive federal funding. In this regard, an attempt was made in 2011 when U.S. Senator Frank Lautenberg (D-NJ) and Representative Rush D. Holt, Jr. (D-NJ) introduced the Tyler Clementi Higher Education Anti-Harassment Act, which would mandate that colleges and universities that receive federal funding have policies in place to address harassment—including cyberbullying. Universities would be required to address harassment that focuses on real or perceived race, color, national origin, sex, disability, sexual orientation, gender identity, or religion. The bill would also enable the U.S. Department of Education to provide training to institututions of higher education to prevent or address harassment. Furthermore, the bill addresses not just student-to-student harassment, but also harassment of students by faculty or staff as well. This proposed bill stalled due to its free speech implications, plus the fact that on-campus harassment was already covered by traditional criminal law.

==== State legislation ====
Some U.S. states have begun to address the problem of cyberbullying. States that have passed legislation have done so generally in response to incidents within that state, to address what they believe to be shortcomings in federal laws, or to expand protection to victims above and beyond existing statutes. Many of these statutes have not yet advanced beyond the proposal stage, and some have been struck down by their respective state courts, often due to free speech violations.

In 2008, Florida passed the Jeffrey Johnston Stand Up For All Students Act in response to the suicide of 15-year-old Jeffrey Johnston, who had suffered cyberbullying over a long period of time. Unusually among state laws regarding cyberbullying, one provision withholds funding for schools that do not comply with a mandate to inform parents of those involved in cyberbullying—both the bully and the victim. In 2008 Missouri revised its statutes on harassment to include harassment and stalking through electronic and telephonic communications after the suicide of Megan Meier.

In 2009, California enacted a law that allows schools to suspend or expel students who harass other students online. It also mandates that schools develop policies to address the problem. In 2010, New York state passed the Dignity For All Students Act, focusing primarily on elementary and middle school students. In 2010, In response to Phoebe Prince's suicide, as well as that of Carl Walker—both of whom had been bullied before taking their lives—the Massachusetts legislature passed what advocates call one of the toughest anti-bullying laws in the nation. The law prohibits both online taunting and physical or emotional abuse, and mandates training for faculty and students at schools. It further mandates that school administrators inform parents of bullying that occurs within the schools themselves.

Illinois has also added penalties for "Harassment through electronic communications" to its criminal code. Washington state takes the approach of putting the focus on cyberbullying prevention and response directly on the schools. The law also requires schools to create policies to address bullying in a general sense.

== See also ==
- Cyberbullying
- Suicide of Megan Meier
- Suicide of Amanda Todd
- Suicide of Ryan Halligan
- Suicide of Tyler Clementi
- Cyberstalking legislation
