= South Korean cyber defamation law =

South Korean legislation

Cyber defamation or cyber insult in South Korean law is a crime or civil tort consisting of defamation or insult committed through a telecommunications network such as the Internet.

The crime of cyber defamation (사이버 명예훼손죄) is defined in the Information and Communications Network Act, which establishes a maximum term of imprisonment of three years if the insulting information is true and seven years if it is false. South Korea's criminal penalties for cyber defamation have attracted attention for their severity relative to other countries. Historian Park Yu-ha faced criminal defamation charges in connection with her book Comfort Women of the Japanese Empire: Colonial Rule and the Battle over Memory, prompting discussion among scholars and international observers about the application of defamation law to interpretations of historical issues.

== Background ==
The cyber defamation law arose from considerations by the Korea Communications Commission (KCC), South Korea's telecommunications and broadcasting regulator, of revising the telecommunications laws to impose more regulations and deeper scrutiny on major Internet portals.

=== Cyber insult legislation ===
Public anger over the 2008 suicide of celebrity Choi Jin-sil led to a legislative push for stronger legislation against cyberbullying, including the adoption of a real name system. Among the legislative items pushed by the government was a cyber insult law, which would have imposed greater penalties than those provided for criminal insult under Article 311 of the Penal Code. The legislation was sometimes referred to as the "Choi Jin-sil Law," although the family objected to this use of her name. The governing Grand National Party (GNP) supported the cyber insult law, while the opposition Democratic Party opposed it. A Research & Research survey of 800 Korean people conducted on 14 January 2009 showed that 60% supported the GNP-led bill dealing with cyber defamation, and 32.1% opposed it.

Opposition to the proposed legislation gained force after the acquittal of Minerva in April 2009, which increased concerns over legislative restrictions on freedom of expression. The legislation was ultimately not adopted.

== Impacts ==
South Korean plaintiffs have used cyber defamation law to subpoena information from the United States. In 2024 a California court granted the attorney representing NewJeans permission to obtain the identity information of a YouTube user. Other similar cases include HYBE on behalf of BTS seeking the identity of a Twitter user and Starship Entertainment on behalf of Wonyoung identifying an individual behind a YouTube channel with help from Google.

=== Online gaming ===
The vast majority of cyber defamation police reports in South Korea arise from online games. League of Legends is a game which is notorious for such acts. In 2015 alone, South Korean law enforcement received and investigated over 8000 reports of cyber defamation; over half of these cases involve League of Legends where players head to police stations as a retaliation after being verbally abused by teammates or opponents.

== See also ==
- Censorship in South Korea
- Cyberbullying legislation
- Cyberstalking legislation
- Internet censorship in South Korea
- Political libel
- Strategic lawsuit against public participation
