= Lawrence Ng (entrepreneur) =

Entrepreneur and business executive

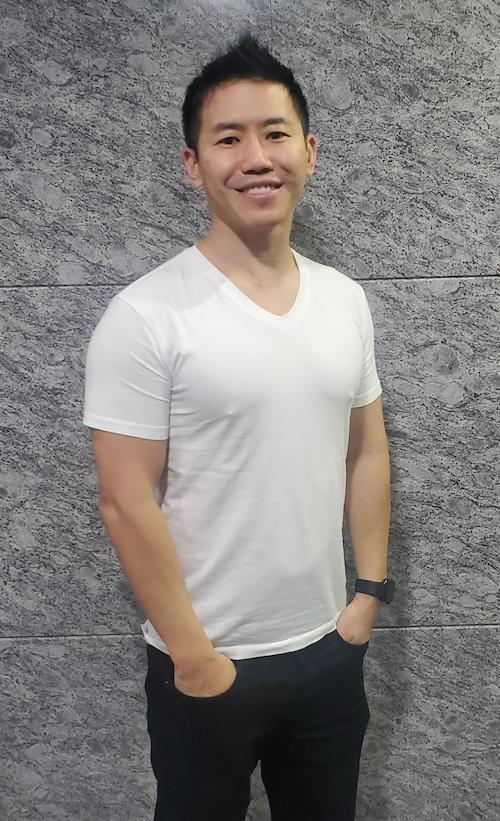
- Born: 9 November 1978 (age 47); British Hong Kong
- Education: Pace University; University of Southern California (BA)
- Occupations: Entrepreneur; philanthropist
- Years active: 2000–present

Lawrence Ng is an entrepreneur and business executive, best known as the co-founder and former CEO of Oversee.net, a 2000s-era company that specialized in domain services and internet marketing services.

== Early life and ownership of Oversee.net ==
Ng immigrated from Hong Kong at the age of 3 and was raised in New York City. He grew up in relative poverty and was homeless until the age of 5. He recounted in a 2023 interview that he worked more than a dozen jobs before he turned 18 to make ends meet.

He was admitted to Pace University in 1996, and later transferred to the University of Southern California, where he received a degree in business. In 1999, shortly after graduating, he began his career at a company called Startpath, a traditional ad network. It was here that he met his future business partner, Fred Hsu. Following the end of the dot-com bubble in 2000, Startpath went under, and Hsu and Ng jointly launched Oversee.net. Among other ventures, the company was engaged in domain name trading.

The company initially had modest revenue, but grew quickly. By 2006, Oversee.net owned around half of a million websites and its yearly revenues exceeded $100 million. In early 2007, Ernst & Young named Ng as one of the finalists for their 2007 Entrepreneur of the Year Award in the Greater Los Angeles area, and one year later, the New York Times listed Oversee.net as one of the largest companies in the domain name trading space, along with Demand Media. Oversee.net was also named to the Inc. 500 list, which catalogues the fastest-growing companies in the US, and received several other awards as well.

== Charity work and startup incubation ==
In 2009, Ng liquidated his interest in Oversee.net and launched The Lawrence C Ng Family Foundation, which is dedicated to funding non-profit organizations that provide education and career guidance to underprivileged children.

Ng also became active in the angel investing and startup incubation spaces. In 2015, he joined the advisory board of Metamorphic Ventures, a New York City-based venture capital firm, and later that year, financial media outlets reported that he had launched the Onramp Fund, a startup incubator.

Onramp subsequently invested in several businesses. These included Simply Bridal, a wedding dress company, and KidGuard, a parental monitoring app for iOS and Android smartphones. Following KidGuard's launch, it became the subject of significant media attention and attracted both praise and controversy.
