= Manav Singh =

Indian adolescent; died by suicide (2002–2020)

- Born: 27 November 2002
- Died: 4 May 2020 (aged 17); Gurugram, Haryana, India
- Cause of death: Suicide by jumping
- Education: Class XII
- Known for: Died by suicide due to false allegation of rape and constant threats, Cybercrime

Manav Singh ([maːnɛʋ sɪ́ŋɡ]; 27 November 2002 – 4 May 2020) was a 17-year-old boy from Gurugram, India, who died by suicide after being accused of sexual harassment by Bhavleen Kaur on her Instagram stories. The boy took his own life by jumping off the 11th floor balcony of his home on 4 May 2020. Following the allegations, he was bullied, shamed, and received threats.

The police investigation around the suicide has been claimed to be faulty, leading to the boy's parents filing a petition in a Gurgaon court, which noted that the police had been working at a low pace for 'reasons best known to them'. In June 2021, National Human Rights Commission of India intervened and declared that the investigation had been vitiated and not fair, directing the case to be transferred to the state Criminal Investigation Department (CID).

The allegations and the suicide happened on same day as the Bois Locker Room incident, and surfaced to the internet on the next, leading many to assume that they were related.

== Biography ==
=== Background ===
A student of Heritage Xperiential Learning School, Gurgaon, Singh was reportedly doing well academically and wished to study abroad. His father worked in the private sector, while his mother was a homemaker. They were living in a rented condominium in DLF Carlton Estate, Gurugram, and had been living at home since March 2020, when the COVID-19 lockdown began.

=== Accusation ===
Almost an hour before his suicide, Kaur had posted an Instagram story alleging an incident which occurred when Manav was 14–15 years old, accusing him of harassing her, touching her inappropriately and demanding sexual favours. She says she mentioned his name but did not tag him. Soon, her friends took screenshots and started reposting it, tagging Manav. The harassment began immediately. According to Manav's friends, he was shamed, bullied, and threatened. After the story went viral, Manav received threatening calls and messages and was the victim of harassment by the girl and her friends. Manav tried to defend himself and maintained that he was innocent. According to a classmate, Manav pleaded with her friends to take it down, contending that it was not true, but they were relentless. After sustained abuse, he panicked and reached out to his friends. Gurgaon police found chats that Manav had with his friends, minutes before his suicide. The boy wrote he was stressed, asking his friends to keep talking to him.

According to an Instagram post by his brother, he had a panic attack, and took his own life.

=== Suicide ===
On 4 May 2020, at about 11:30 in the evening, Manav jumped off the 11th floor balcony of his home in DLF Carlton Estate, in Gurugram. His phone was in his room during dinner, and his family had gone to sleep at 10:30. An hour later, the intercom rang. His mother heard people crying and looked down to see him lying on the ground. The police said a guard saw him in a pool of blood and alerted his parents. He was rushed to a hospital where he was declared dead on arrival.

== Aftermath and investigation ==
After hearing what happened, Kaur posted another Instagram Story in which she said that it's not her fault that he couldn't handle the pressure, and she even made fun of him and was very happy about his death.

According to the father of Manav, Manoj Singh, he had to push the police officers for several days and even beg them to register a first information report (FIR) but the police were not interested in investigating the case. An initial FIR was filed against 'unknown persons' for abetment of suicide. Singh alleged that the immense distress, shame, fear and unbearable anxieties caused by the "defamatory, slanderous, illegal post" had led to his son committing suicide, and he asked that a case be registered against all persons who had posted the content and against Instagram, which had allowed the public dissemination of the post. The father blamed online harassment and trolling for his son's suicide.

=== Faulty investigation ===
According to Manoj, after the registration of the FIR, the police were completely passive in investigating the case for 2–3 months and didn't submit details of the probe about the involvement of others in the case. The police also did not produce Instagram, WhatsApp or Snapchat records. It was at this point that Manoj Singh's lawyer Amish Aggrawala filed a case under the Section 156 clause 3 of the Criminal Procedure Code which empowers the court to direct the police to register an FIR or even monitor the case after the registration. The case reached the Gurgaon court which expressed concern over the slow pace of investigation, noting "the investigating officers are working at a low pace in the present matter for reasons best known to them," directing the Gurugram police to submit a status report every 15 days until the filing of the final report. According to The Times of India, the father had been "running from pillar to post" to, as Singh said, "get justice for [his] son".

The chargesheet was filed at the end of January. According to Aggrawala, this chargesheet was preceded by 4 months of stretching out of the investigation by the police. Kaur and a friend are currently facing trial under Section 305 (abetment to suicide) and Section 34 of the Indian Penal Code. After the chargesheet was filed, the family's legal counsel filed a protest petition, saying the investigation was faulty, because they had named several witnesses and accused, none of which were examined. As per her bail application, two other minor students from the same school claim to have been accused of molestation by the same girl on rejecting her sexual advances.

=== Intervention by the National Human Rights Commission ===
In June 2021, the National Human Rights Commission of India intervened in the case after a petition by the boy's family. The Commission conducted a perusal and declared that there had not been a fair investigation in the matter, citing problems such as the silence of the enquiry report on any arrests, the mobile phones not being sent for forensics on time, and the filing of a final report without the procurement of any "mobile phone data report, snapchat, instagram from FSL, Madhuban" [sic]. The Commission termed the investigation done by the I.O. as "nothing but a vitiated investigation which cannot rise to a valid chargesheet."

The commission also cited lapses in the investigation by the Investigation Officer, stating that they seemed to "fail to follow the basic principle and procedure of law," and subsequently directed the state's home department to transfer the case to the state CID and away from the Gurgaon Police.

=== Alleged links to the 'Bois Locker Room' incident ===
The allegations happened a day after the bois locker room incident, leading many to assume that they were related.

== See also ==
- Suicide prevention
- Cyberbullying
- Suicide intervention
- Suicide of Amanda Todd
- Jasleen Kaur harassment controversy
- Rohtak sisters viral video controversy
