= New Jersey v. Dharun Ravi =

2012 hate crime trial in the U.S. state of New Jersey

- Court: Superior Court in Middlesex County, New Jersey
- Full case name: State of New Jersey vs. Dharun Ravi
- Decided: March 12, 2012
- Verdict: Guilty on all counts (2012; overturned in 2016)

Case history
- Appealed to: Appellate Division
- Subsequent actions: Ravi sentenced to 30 days in jail (paroled after 20 days), plus 3 years probation and 300 hours of community service; Appellate court found bias intimidation laws unconstitutional, invalidating Ravi's original convictions. Ravi subsequently accepted a guilty plea deal from prosecutors, for one count of attempted invasion of privacy.

Court membership
- Judge sitting: Glenn Berman

State of New Jersey vs. Dharun Ravi was a criminal trial held in Middlesex County, New Jersey, Superior Court from February 24, 2012, to March 16, 2012, in which former Rutgers University undergraduate student Dharun Ravi was tried and convicted on 15 counts of crimes involving invasion of privacy, attempted invasion of privacy, bias intimidation, tampering with evidence, witness tampering, and hindering apprehension or prosecution.

The charges stemmed from incidents that occurred on September 19 and 21, 2010. On September 9, 2016, a New Jersey court of appeals overturned the conviction and ordered a new trial on narrower charges. The following month, Ravi accepted a plea deal and pleaded guilty to one count of attempted invasion of privacy.

In the first incident, Ravi and his friend Molly Wei used a webcam to view a private romantic encounter between Ravi's roommate, Tyler Clementi, and another man identified only as "M.B."

In the second incident, Ravi urged friends and Twitter followers to watch via his webcam a second private encounter between Clementi and M.B., though the viewing never occurred. Clementi died by suicide on September 22, 2010, and his death brought national and international attention to Ravi's trial.

On May 21, 2012, Ravi was sentenced to 30 days in jail, 3 years probation, 300 hours of community service, a $10,000 fine, and counseling on cyberbullying and alternate lifestyles. Ravi served 20 days of his 30-day jail term from May 31 to June 19, 2012, at the Middlesex County Adult Corrections Center in North Brunswick, New Jersey.

== Events leading up to the indictments and trial ==
=== First webcam incident ===
Before September 17, 2010, Clementi had chatted online with a man whose identity has not been made public. While Ravi was out for the evening on September 17, the man came to Clementi's dorm room for the first time.

On the nights of September 19 and 21, Clementi texted Ravi about using their room for the evening. On the first occasion, Ravi met Clementi's male friend, and Clementi said that the two wanted to be alone for the evening. In conversations with Wei and later text messages with friends, Ravi expressed distrust of the stranger that Clementi brought into the room, describing him as "an older, shabbier-looking guy".

Ravi said he was worried about theft and that he left the computer in a state where he could view the webcam due to those concerns. However, other witnesses testified that Ravi said he also wanted to confirm that Clementi was gay. Ravi and Wei viewed the livestream via iChat for a few seconds, seeing Clementi and his guest kissing. Ravi posted to his 150 Twitter followers, "Roommate asked for the room till midnight. I went into molly's room and turned on my webcam. I saw him making out with a dude. Yay." Soon after, Wei began an online chat in which she said that the two men had been "kissing [each other] right now / like THEY WERE GROPING EACH OTHER." Later, Wei turned on the camera for another view with four others in the room, though Ravi was not there. During this second viewing, Wei and others saw Clementi and his guest kissing with their shirts off and their pants on.

Clementi followed Ravi on Twitter. Although Clementi could not see Ravi's phone text messages, he saw his Twitter postings the next day. Clementi viewed Ravi's Twitter posts 38 times following the first webcam viewing. Late on September 20, Clementi wrote to a friend online that, initially, he was not really bothered by what Ravi had seen in the first, brief viewing, primarily due to its extreme brevity. According to a Rutgers employee, at about 4 a.m. on September 21, after further conversations online, Clementi sent an online request for a single room because his "roommate used webcam to spy on me."

=== Second planned webcam viewing ===
On September 21, Ravi sent a friend a series of text messages, including messages saying, "Yeah, keep the gays away" and "People are having a viewing party with a bottle of Bacardi and beer in this kid's room for my roommate" along with directions on how to view it remotely.

At 6:39 p.m., Ravi tweeted, "Anyone with iChat, I dare you to video chat me between the hours of 9:30 and 12. Yes, it's happening again." Ravi had set up the webcam and initially pointed it towards Clementi's bed. Ravi later stated that he realized that his "joke" was "stupid", and pointed the webcam towards his own bed before the planned viewing on September 21. The police say, however, that it was subsequently found still pointed directly at Clementi's bed. When Ravi's friend suggested that Clementi and his guest might use his bed, Ravi said "My webcam checks my bed, hahaha."

At trial, two Rutgers students testified that Ravi used their computers to verify that the webcam was still focused on Clementi's bed. One testified that, after Ultimate frisbee practice that evening, Ravi "told me he had set up a webcam of some sort to capture images of his roommate. He told me he had done it before that date" and "that he was planning on doing it again. That night." When Clementi returned to his room, he noticed the camera and texted a friend saying he had unplugged Ravi's power strip to prevent further video streaming during his date. Ravi later said that he had changed his mind regarding the broadcast and disabled the camera himself by putting the computer to sleep.

On September 21, Clementi complained to a resident assistant and two other officials that Ravi had used a webcam to livestream part of Clementi's private sexual encounter with another man. The resident assistant testified at trial that Clementi appeared shaky and uncomfortable when they met around 11 p.m., and in his official report of the meeting, the resident assistant said that Clementi requested both punishment and a room change for Ravi.

In a formal e-mail request to the resident assistant made after the meeting, Clementi described the two viewing incidents, quoted from Ravi's Twitter postings, and wrote "I feel that my privacy has been violated and I am extremely uncomfortable sharing a room with someone who would act in this wildly inappropriate manner." Clementi wrote in detail on the Just Us Boys and Yahoo! message boards about complaints he filed through university channels about his roommate. His posts indicated that he did not want to share a room with Ravi after he learned about the first incident and then discovered that Ravi invited his Twitter followers to watch a second sexual encounter. "He [the resident assistant] seemed to take it seriously," Clementi wrote in a post about 15 hours before his jump from the George Washington Bridge.

On September 22, a friend of Ravi asked what had happened to the livestream the night before. Ravi responded, "It got messed up and didn't work." In the afternoon, the resident assistant confronted Ravi about Clementi's written complaint. Within a few hours, Clementi returned to his dorm room and he and Ravi were there together for less than an hour.

== Clementi's suicide and Ravi's apologies ==
On the evening of September 22, the day after Ravi's second webcam transmission attempt, Clementi left the dorm room and got food. At around 6:30 p.m., he headed toward the George Washington Bridge. By 8:42 p.m., Clementi had made his way to the George Washington Bridge and posted from his cell phone on Facebook, "Jumping off the gw bridge sorry."

Five minutes after Clementi posted on Facebook, Ravi sent the first of two final messages to Clementi. The messages were sent after Ravi had been visited that afternoon by the resident assistant and told of Clementi's complaint:

I want to explain what happened. Sunday night when you requested to have someone over I didn't realize you wanted the room in private. I went to Molly's room and I was showing her how I set up my computer so I can access it from anywhere. I turned on my camera and saw you in the corner of the screen and I immediately closed it. I felt uncomfortable and guilty of what happened. Obviously I told people what occurred so they could give me advice. Then Tuesday when you requested the room again I wanted to make sure what happened Sunday wouldn't happen again and not to video chat me from 930 to 12. Just in case, I turned my camera away and put my computer to sleep so even if anyone tried it wouldn't work. I wanted to make amends for Sunday night. I'm sorry if you heard something distorted and disturbing but I assure you all my actions were good natured.

The prosecution noted that the apology came after Ravi learned he faced discipline by Rutgers. Prosecutor Julia McClure said that the apology was one of "many attempts" by Ravi to "dilute, cover up and explain, in other words to tamper with the facts and to fabricate evidence that could be looked on as favorable to him."

Ten minutes later, Ravi texted again:

I've known you were gay and I have no problem with it. In fact one of my closest friends is gay and he and I have a very open relationship. I just suspected you were shy about it which is why I never broached the topic. I don't want your freshman year to be ruined because of a petty misunderstanding, it's adding to my guilt. You have a right to move if you wish but I don't want you to feel pressured to without fully understanding the situation.

== Indictments ==
On September 28, 2010, Dharun Ravi and Molly Wei were charged with four and two counts of invasion of privacy, respectively, for their roles in the webcam spying incidents on September 19, 2010 and September 21, 2010.

Under New Jersey law, one commits a fourth-degree crime of invasion of privacy if one observes another person without that person's consent under circumstances in which a "reasonable person would know that another may expose intimate parts or may engage in sexual penetration or sexual contact." A third-degree crime is committed if one discloses a "reproduction of the image" of the observed person. Ravi was charged with both third- and fourth-degree invasion of privacy.

Soon after these charges were filed, there were calls from gay rights advocates and bloggers to include hate crimes charges against Ravi and Wei.

Bruce Kaplan, the prosecutor in the case, said "now that two individuals have been charged with invasion of privacy, we will be making every effort to assess whether bias played a role in the incident, and, if so, we will bring appropriate charges." On October 4, 2010, Kaplan stated that he did not think there would be enough evidence to charge Ravi and Wei with a hate crime. After further investigation, the prosecution concluded that there was evidence supporting a hate crime charge against Ravi, dating to when Ravi first learned of Clementi's name. On April 20, 2011, a Middlesex County grand jury indicted Ravi on 15 counts, including bias intimidation, invasion of privacy, witness tampering, and evidence tampering.

The witness tampering charges were based on text messages Ravi sent to Wei, in which he tried to persuade her not to contradict what he had told police. In these messages, Ravi said "Did you tell them we did it on purpose?", and "Because I said we were just messing around with the camera." Wei responded "Omg dharun why didnt u talk to me first i told them everything". According to a prosecution expert witness, Ravi deleted almost 100 text messages between him, Wei and another high school friend, whom he had invited to view Clementi's second encounter with his guest. A key aspect of the prosecution's evidence tampering charge was Ravi's deletion of two potentially incriminating postings: one on Twitter on September 19 in which he wrote that his roommate was "making out with a dude. Yay", and one on September 21 in which he told his iChat followers "dare you to video chat me" during the time of Clementi's tryst. He replaced the latter post with one that said "don't you dare video chat me" at the time of the tryst, stating that the first message was a draft. Ravi was charged with third and fourth degree invasion of privacy.

=== Public statements by defense ===
Soon after the charges against Wei were made public, Wei's attorneys released a statement proclaiming her innocence, and a former New Jersey federal prosecutor commented that, "there's no evidence of Ms. Wei doing anything. I'm very curious as to why the prosecutor is holding her responsible in any way, shape, or form simply because Mr. Ravi was using her computer."

Steve Altman, Ravi's attorney, said, "Nothing was transmitted beyond one computer and what was seen was only viewed for a matter of seconds." Rubin Sinins, Wei's attorney, said, "I'm unaware of any evidence of sexual contact. The statute defining sexual contact refers to nudity and private parts, and, to my knowledge, nothing like that was seen. I'm also unaware of any evidence that any video was recorded, reproduced or disseminated in any way."

=== Pleas ===
Wei and the prosecutor reached a plea agreement on May 6, 2011. Under the agreement, all charges against Wei would be dropped if Wei testified against Ravi and completed a three-year intervention program, including counseling and community service. Clementi's parents "supported leniency for Wei", believing that her "actions, although unlawful, were substantially different in their nature and their extent than the actions of Tyler's former roommate" and that she "was forthcoming and cooperative during the investigation."

In December 2011, Ravi rejected a plea agreement in which he would not spend any time in jail and through which the prosecutor's office would assist him in fighting any potential deportation orders. Ravi is a citizen of India living legally in the United States. In rejecting the plea arrangement, Ravi's lawyer stated: "Simple answer, simple principle ... He's innocent. He's not guilty. That's why he rejected the plea."

== Trial arguments and testimony ==
Ravi was represented during the trial by attorneys Steven Altman and Philip Nettl of the New Jersey criminal defense law firm Benedict & Altman. The trial lasted 13 days with closing arguments ending on March 13, 2012.

=== Pretrial motion ===
In August 2011, Ravi's defense attorney requested a mistrial because the prosecution had not presented evidence to the grand jury which, he argued, would have cleared Ravi, and had presented other evidence in what he said was a misleading manner. This evidence included documents that showed that Clementi had titled files on his computer "Why does it have to be so painful" and took photographs of the George Washington Bridge a month before entering Rutgers. The judge did not grant Ravi's motion. Ravi was not charged with a role in the suicide.

=== Opening arguments ===
On February 24, 2012, Assistant Prosecutor Julia McClure told jurors that Dharun Ravi acted to "deprive" Tyler Clementi of his "privacy" and "dignity" when he observed an intimate encounter of Clementi and later invited others to watch a second liaison of Clementi and his friend. Ravi's actions were not, she emphasized, a "prank", "accident", or "mistake", but rather were "intentional", "planned", "criminal", and "mean-spirited". She said Ravi was motivated by the fact that Clementi was homosexual: "he sought to brand Tyler as different from everybody else" and "to set him up for contempt." Later, she explained, Ravi tried to "cover up the tracks" of his actions by altering evidence.

Defense attorney Steven Altman said that Ravi's actions were those of an "18-year-old boy". He argued that although these actions may have been "immature" and "stupid", they were not hateful, bigoted, or criminal. "There was no bullying," Altman emphasized. Ravi never "harassed", "ridiculed", or even said "anything bad" about his roommate. Moreover, Altman said that Ravi saw only a few seconds of hugging and that nobody "transmitted" or "reproduced any image of anything".

=== September 19 viewing: Testimony of Rutgers students ===
Wei testified that, shortly after 9 p.m. on September 19, 2010, Dharun Ravi came to Wei's room and within a few minutes he showed her how he could get live images from his room via an auto-accept feature of his computer's video chat. Wei said that both she and Ravi were "shocked" when they saw Clementi and another man leaning against the bed kissing. Wei said that she and Ravi viewed for only a few seconds, turned off the livestream, and initially agreed not to tell anyone, because it "just felt weird" and she felt it was wrong. Several minutes later she chatted about the incident online. Ravi later left the room to shower and Wei, within an hour of the initial viewing, accessed Ravi's webcam again, at the request of a friend, and briefly showed four other students. Wei said the scene was the same as that before, except that the men's shirts were off. According to one student, the two men were turned so one could not see their faces.

Wei and other students testified that Ravi had told them that he was concerned about his possessions. Two of these students testified that Ravi also said he wanted to confirm that his roommate was gay. Several students described Clementi's guest as "shabby" or "shady". The prosecution argued that only Ravi and one other student had seen Clementi's guest in person and that the other student said the guest was not "anything out of the ordinary" and, while older, was "not obscenely old". None of the students said that Ravi had expressed any animosity towards gays. One student said that Ravi had called Clementi "nice", and another said that Ravi had told him he had a gay friend. Wei said that Ravi mentioned that Clementi was gay, but "didn't make a big deal out of it".

=== Testimony of M.B. ===
On March 2, 2012, Tyler Clementi's guest, M.B., testified for more than five hours. To protect his privacy as a possible crime victim, the judge ordered that media could show only his hands and could not record him—courtroom restrictions that were a "rare exception" according to The New York Times account. M.B.'s testimony was important, not only because he himself was an alleged victim, but because the defense had portrayed him as a suspicious character that prompted Ravi's actions. According to former prosecutor John Fahy, it was also important for the prosecution to establish that sexual activity had occurred, and M.B. had to answer specific questions about the nature of that activity.

Kate Zernike of The New York Times described M.B. as having "close-cropped hair", not dressed as casually as on September 19, 2010, but his "hair and bearing much the same" as in the Rutgers dormitory surveillance camera photo. She wrote that "he did not look, as Mr. Ravi's friends have described him, 'scruffy' or 'shady'." However, M.B. testified that he had not shaved the evening of the encounter.

According to M.B.'s testimony, he and Clementi met on a social network site and the September 19 meeting was the second of three dates. M.B. said his relationship with Clementi was a "good relationship", which included continual texting and online chats, and that Clementi was "happy" when he last saw him.

M.B. said that during the September 19 visit he noticed a webcam pointed at Clementi's bed and thought the position "was kind of strange", although he did not think that anyone was actually watching. In cross-examination, he noted he remembered this only when it later became relevant. M.B. also said that when he lay in Clementi's bed, he heard people joking and laughing in the courtyard, and it "seemed like the jokes were at somebody else's expense". When he left the room, there were about five students who "seemed to be looking at me and it seemed kind of unsettling".

=== September 21: Timeline of Ravi's communications and events ===
Ravi's communications, both in person and in texts and tweets, were key evidence in regard to the September 21 incident. The prosecution contended that on September 21 Ravi set up his webcam to view a second tryst of Clementi's and advertised it to friends and Twitter followers. The viewing was thwarted, they argued, only because Clementi unplugged the computer. Ravi said that his messages were made in a joking manner and that he later turned off the webcam so that no viewing would occur.

Tyler Clementi followed Ravi's Twitter messages, visiting Ravi's Twitter page 38 times on the two days before his suicide. Clementi saved two of the messages. On September 20, Clementi saw the first message, which Ravi had made a few minutes after the September 19 viewing, and Clementi discussed it with friends. Ravi wrote: "Roommate asked for the room till midnight. I went into Molly's room and turned on my webcam. I saw him making out with a dude. Yay." The second saved message was sent by Ravi at 6:39 p.m. on September 21, after Clementi requested private use of the room for another tryst late that afternoon: "Anyone with i-chat, I dare you to video chat me between 9:30 and 12. Yes, it's happening again."

On the afternoon of September 21, Ravi texted his friend Michelle Huang. Ravi said that Clementi's guest "was older and creepy and def from the internet". He said he had not seen the guest since September 19, but "My webcam checks my bed hahaha. I got so creeped out after Sunday." He then added, "Yeah keep the gays away."

Shortly after Ravi sent his "dare you" tweet at 6:39 p.m., Ravi urged Huang to later watch the livestream: "Do it for real! I have it pointed at his bed. And the monitor is off so he can't see you. Be careful it could get nasty." At 8:41, in another text conversation, Ravi told Huang that "people are having a viewing party" with rum and beer. Ravi told Huang the next day, "It got messed up and didn't work." On September 23, Ravi and Huang discussed Clementi's death and Huang asked, "Didn't you say there was a viewing party once. ..." Ravi answered, "No that was a joke."

Two Rutgers students testified that Ravi, in an apparent test of his webcam, used computers in their rooms to connect to his own. A Rutgers information technology analyst reported that iChat connections were made with Ravi's computer from these students' computers at 6:58 and 7:44 p.m. on September 21. The first student said that Ravi encouraged him to text friends to watch Clementi's date and that Ravi used his computer to test the angle of the webcam so that it was pointed at Clementi's bed. The second student said that after dinner Ravi "hyped up" his earlier "dare you" tweet, that Ravi used her computer to access his iChat, and that "Tyler's side of the room came into view" when the webcam was accessed. The first student said that the next day he told Ravi that the livestream had not worked: "Then I saw [Ravi] in the lounge and I said, 'Yo, it didn't work.' And he said, 'Yeah, I have been getting that from a lot of people.'"

At 9:15 p.m., Clementi saved a screenshot of Ravi's "dare you to video chat me" tweet. At 9:25, Ravi's computer was disconnected, according to analysis by the Rutgers IT expert, and it stayed disconnected till 11:19 p.m. At 9:33, Clementi told a friend online that he had turned off the power strip to Ravi's computer. At 10:19, Clementi's guest arrived.

Ravi left for ultimate frisbee practice around 8:30–9:00 p.m. The captain of the frisbee team testified that at 11 p.m. after practice, he, Ravi and others went to get takeout food at the dining hall and that Ravi said that "he had set up a webcam of some sorts to capture images of his roommate", had "done it before," and that night "was planning on doing it again". The student also testified that Ravi seemed uncomfortable with his roommate's being gay, but had said nothing explicitly "disparaging".

Shortly after 11 p.m., Ravi texted Clementi to see if he was still using the room. At 11:48, Clementi texted Ravi that "we're done."

In an interview with investigators, Ravi said that he had turned the webcam away from Clementi's bed on September 21. A former university detective testified that, when he inspected the dorm room on September 23, the webcam was "angled directly at Tyler's bed".

=== Clementi's complaints to Rutgers officials ===
Only a portion of Clementi's requests for a room change were permitted to be seen by the jury. After discussing with friends Ravi's first Twitter message ("saw my roommate making out with a dude"), Clementi, at 3:55 a.m. on September 21, filed a request on the Rutgers housing website; he wrote, "roommate used webcam to spy on me/want a single room." The part about spying was ruled hearsay and not admissible. Late on the evening of September 21, after seeing Ravi's "dare you" tweet and just before his meeting with M.B., Clementi visited a resident assistant, Rahi Grover. Grover was not permitted to testify about what Clementi said, but did testify about Clementi's demeanor. He said that Clementi's voice was "a little shaky" and that he appeared uncomfortable. The judge allowed some parts of Grover's official report of the incident: "Tyler is quite upset and feels uncomfortable. Tyler prefers some sort of roommate switch ASAP and prefers some sort of punishment for Dharun Ravi." Grover also included his own recommendation that a roommate change be made as soon as possible, and he offered Clementi a bed in his own room for that night, which Clementi declined.

Grover requested that Clementi later send him an e-mail to formalize the roommate change request, part of which was allowed as evidence. In his e-mail (12:03 a.m.) Clementi wrote: "I feel like my privacy has been violated and I am extremely uncomfortable sharing a room with someone who would act in such a wildly inappropriate manner." The judge ruled that "wildly inappropriate" be excluded from jury evidence since it was not a present sense impression but a description of past actions that Clementi had deliberated on. According to former prosecutor John Fahy, Clementi's e-mail and Grover's testimony were important in regard to whether or not Clementi "reasonably believed he was being intimidated".

=== Reactions to prosecution ===
Observers who commented after the prosecution rested its case, and before the defense brought its arguments, differed on the strength of the prosecution's case. Susan Abraham, a law professor and former public defender, said that she believed that the prosecution had established both the invasion of privacy and the bias intimidation charges. There is "no question", she said, that Clementi believed he was selected because of his sexual orientation, and some of Ravi's messages referring to gays might also be evidence of intent; she noted that, under the New Jersey bias intimidation law, the prosecution does not have to prove a biased intent, but only a reasonable belief by the victim that he was targeted because of sexual orientation. Abraham also guessed that one defense argument would be that, when Ravi admitted to violating privacy in his statements to the police, he did not understand the legal meaning of "invasion of privacy" and made the statement under duress.

After the indictments, attorney Edward Weinstein had said that the prosecution case might be weak, but after hearing the prosecution case, he concluded that "The defense has an extremely large burden; the prosecution put on a good case." He noted that Ravi's Twitter messages, revealed during the trial, showed that "he was not just a mischievous kid pulling a prank", though he also felt that the outcome of the case "totally remains to be seen".

Jack Levin, an authority on hate crimes, was skeptical of the case for bias intimidation, saying of Ravi that "it becomes difficult to determine whether the motivation was due to sexual orientation or some other conflicts between the roommates that have nothing to do with sexual orientation", although he also noted that the position of the camera had raised doubts about Ravi's contention that he was primarily concerned about protecting his possessions.

In a news analysis published shortly before the verdict was announced, Chris Cuomo of ABC News wrote that "for the most part, the consensus of reporters and legal analysts following the trial is that the state's hate crime charges are thin, at best."

=== Reactions to defense ===
After the first morning of the defense presentation on March 9, 2012, trial attorney Brian Claypool viewed the overall defense strategy as effective, but he questioned defense techniques in trying to show that Ravi was not anti-gay. The character witnesses called, he said, were ineffective because the prosecution showed there was "no foundation" for them to say that Ravi was not anti-gay. Claypool said that the defense theme (of Ravi's not having bias) should have been pursued with numerous additional witnesses. He also said that Ravi himself needed to testify to show he had no bias against gays and to explain the inconsistencies in his recorded interview with the police.

John Fahy, a former Bergen County Prosecutor, said after closing arguments that both the defense and prosecution did a "very good job". In regard to the invasion of privacy charge, Fahy said the defense was effective in raising reasonable doubt by characterizing the incidents as a "frolic" of "first-year college students". Regarding bias intimidation, Fahy said that there was "not a lot of proof" that the viewing was done because Clementi was gay. In regard to obstruction of justice, Fahy noted that a few texts by Ravi were "very difficult to explain". Fahy said that the police interview revealed a "kid not used to being interrogated" and that the interview contained "one big lie" by Ravi—that in the second (September 21) incident he had "turned the computer off and later turned it on."

== Verdict ==
=== Jury decision ===
After 12 hours of deliberations over two and a half days, a jury of 12 members and three alternates reached a verdict on March 16, 2012. Ravi was found guilty of invasion of privacy, hindering apprehension, witness tampering, and all four of the bias intimidation counts. In regard to the viewing on September 19, the jury concluded that Ravi did not act with the purpose to intimidate either Clementi or his guest because of their sexual orientation, but that Clementi was intimidated and reasonably believed that he had been targeted because of his sexual orientation. In regard to the planned viewing on September 21 and Ravi's encouragement of his Twitter followers to watch, the jury concluded that Ravi acted with the purpose to intimidate, with the knowledge that intimidation would occur, and with the result that Clementi was intimidated and reasonably believed that he was targeted because of sexual orientation. Ravi was acquitted of all bias charges against M.B.

=== Reactions ===
Five days after the verdict, Ravi said in an interview:

I'm not the same person I was two years ago. I don't even recognize the person I was two years ago" ... [Ravi went on to say that he was "immature. And did some stupid things. And was insensitive to Tyler Clementi’s feelings"] ... "But I wasn't biased. I didn't act out of hate and I wasn't uncomfortable with Tyler being gay. ... I'm never going to regret not taking the plea ... If I took the plea, I would have had to testify that I did what I did to intimidate Tyler and that would be a lie. I won't ever get up there and tell the world I hated Tyler because he was gay, or tell the world I was trying to hurt or intimidate him because it's not true.

In another interview, he said:

Bad stuff happens and they need to set an example, but it's unfortunate this has to be the case where this happens ... The people that are fighting for gay rights, they have a just cause. I think this kind of detracts from their cause ... This is something people can point to and say, 'You guys are going overboard.' I think it's bad for them.

On March 23, Joseph Clementi, Tyler's father, said that the family believed that the jury had reached the "correct verdict," which "was based on the facts and the evidence"; the defense explanation, he added, "was simply not believable". "I have said all along we were looking for justice and accountability. I trusted the Courts and the State of New Jersey to get this right ... and they did."

Clementi's guest, identified only as MB at the trial, reacted to the verdict on March 16, 2012. He said, "I had hoped for all concerned that a trial could have been avoided, but that was not my choice. It was Mr. Ravi's decision, and now he will have to live with it." MB's attorney said that the jury had been thorough and that the jury was correct in not finding MB to be the victim of a bias crime since the Rutgers students "didn't know anything about our client".

The trial and the verdict sparked nationwide debate on the validity and efficacy of the New Jersey hate crime statute and similar laws. Marcellus A. McRae, a former federal prosecutor uninvolved in the case, hailed the guilty verdicts as "a watershed moment, because it says youth is not immunity". Steven Goldstein, the chairman of a New Jersey equal rights advocacy group, said that "This verdict sends the important message that a 'kids will be kids' defense is no excuse to bully another student." Louis Raveson, a professor of criminal and civil trial litigation at Rutgers School of Law-Newark, said that bias intimidation criteria had been met: "I think the statute correctly predicted this kind of crime and ... is being used appropriately."

Glenn Berman, the judge who presided over Ravi's trial, said that the New Jersey statute was "muddled" and that he would have written it differently. The editorial board of the Newark newspaper, The Star-Ledger, criticized both the law and its application, arguing that Ravi's crime was not malicious, the law was unconstitutional, and the application of the law against Ravi was a "huge overreach". Washington Post columnist Richard Cohen criticized Ravi for "bullying (via webcam)", but argued that hate crime laws unfairly punish an individual for thought or speech, and therefore erode civil liberties. In a New York Times op-ed piece, journalist Emily Bazelon argued that, while Ravi's invasion of Clementi's privacy "should be out of bounds on a college campus," the punishment he faced was disproportionate to that crime, and that hate crime laws were not intended for these types of actions.

== Sentencing hearing ==
=== Sentence ===
On May 21, 2012, Judge Glenn Berman sentenced Ravi to 30 days in jail, 3 years' probation, 300 hours of community service, a $10,000 fine, and counseling on cyberbullying and alternate lifestyles. "It wasn't my deal," the judge said. "It was the state's." Lead prosecutor Julia McClure had sought a five-year prison term and on May 23, 2012 filed a motion appealing the sentence.

On May 30, 2012, Ravi waived his right to remain free during the appeals process and began his jail term at the Middlesex County Adult Corrections Center in North Brunswick, New Jersey on May 31, 2012.

Ravi was released from jail on June 19, 2012, after serving 20 days of his 30-day term, with 5 days of credit for good behavior and 5 days of work credits.

Ravi is a permanent resident of the United States who immigrated at age 6. Clementi's family, M.B., and the judge all recommended Ravi not be deported. In June 2012, Immigration and Customs Enforcement officials announced that the convictions were not serious enough to seek deportation.

=== Apology issue ===
Judge Berman said that Ravi's "'letter of apology' to the pre-sentence people" was "unimpressive" and "didn't even mention the seven cover-up charges". He said it was "ironic" that Ravi's letter "doesn't mention M.B. as if he doesn't exist", yet M.B. had in his letter offered to write a letter to help Ravi avoid deportation. Ravi declined the opportunity to speak at the sentencing hearing and was reprimanded by Judge Berman for not having publicly apologized: "I heard this jury say guilty 288 times—24 questions, 12 jurors, that's the multiplication. And I haven't heard you apologize once."

On May 29, 2012, Ravi released the following statement:

I accept responsibility for and regret my thoughtless, insensitive, immature, stupid and childish choices that I made on September 19, 2010 and September 21, 2010. My behavior and actions, which at no time were motivated by hate, bigotry, prejudice or desire to hurt, humiliate or embarrass anyone, were nonetheless the wrong choices and decisions. I apologize to everyone affected by those choices.

Clementi's parents responded:

As to the so-called 'apology,' it was, of course, no apology at all, but a public relations piece produced by Mr. Ravi's advisers only after Judge Berman scolded Mr. Ravi in open court for his failure to have expressed a word of remorse or apology. ... A sincere apology is personal. Many people convicted of crimes address the victims and their families in court. Mr. Ravi was given that opportunity but chose to say nothing. His press release did not mention Tyler or our family, and it included no words of sincere remorse, compassion or responsibility for the pain he caused.

== Appeals ==
Both the prosecutors and Ravi filed separate appeals. In February 2016, Ravi asked the courts to overturn his convictions.

On September 9, 2016, the Superior Court of New Jersey, Appellate Division overturned the conviction after the New Jersey Supreme Court ruled that the bias intimidation laws under which Ravi had been convicted were unconstitutional. The appeals court ordered that Ravi could be re-tried on ten other charges.

Ravi accepted a plea deal on October 27, 2016, and pleaded guilty to one count of attempted invasion of privacy, a third-degree felony. He was sentenced to time already served and fines paid, and the remaining charges against him were dropped.
