= Eva Galperin =

American cybersecurity, privacy and anti-stalkerware activist

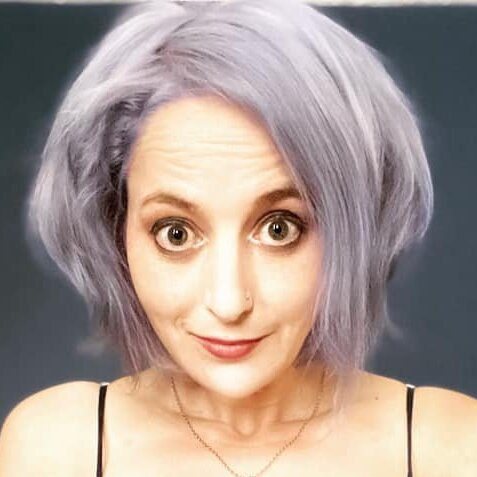
- Galperin in 2021
- Born: Latvia
- Website: www.eff.org/about/staff/eva-galperin

Eva Galperin is the Director of Cybersecurity at the Electronic Frontier Foundation (EFF) and technical advisor for the Freedom of the Press Foundation. She is noted for her extensive work in protecting global privacy and free speech and for her research on malware and nation-state spyware.

== Biography ==
Galperin was born in Latvia to Jewish parents who escaped Soviet antisemitism by seeking refuge in the United States. Her family resettled in California in the 1980s. Galperin became interested in computers at an early age through her father, who was a computer security specialist. When she was 12, he created a desktop for her on his Unix/Solaris computer and she became active in Usenet discussion areas about science fiction novels and playing interactive text games, and she later became active in web development. She attended college at San Francisco State University for political science and international relations while working as a Unix system administrator at various companies in Silicon Valley.

Galperin joined the EFF in 2007. Prior to EFF, she worked at the Center for US–China policy studies, where she helped to organize conferences and researched Chinese energy policy. At EFF, she led the Threat Lab project before she was promoted as the EFF's Director of Cybersecurity in 2017. Since 2018, she focused on the eradication of the "stalkerware" – spyware used for domestic abuse – industry, working with victims of stalkerwares. These malicious applications, which are being marketed to abusive spouses, overbearing parents, and stalkers, can be installed secretly on mobile devices, allowing their owners to monitor their targets' activities.

In April 2019, she convinced anti-virus provider Kaspersky Lab to begin explicitly alerting users of security threats upon detection of stalkerware on the company's Android product. She also asked Apple to allow antivirus applications in its marketplace and, like Kaspersky, to alert its users if their mobile devices have been jailbroken or rooted. Galperin stated that due to competition, more cybersecurity companies will be prompted to follow suit to meet this heightened standard. She has also called on U.S. state and federal officials to arrest and prosecute executives of companies that are developing and selling stalkerwares on charges of hacking.
