= Rohtak sisters viral video controversy =

2014 social media controversy

The Rohtak sisters viral video controversy involves a video that went viral on social media in India in late November 2014 and the events that followed. The first video showed two sisters (referred to as the Rohtak sisters or the Sonepat sisters) beating three young men with a belt alleging that the men had harassed them. Soon, the video was being broadcast by television channels. The girls were praised by the media and given the nickname "bravehearts". After a second video emerged within a few days, which showed them kicking another boy, the opinions began to shift towards negative. Six women claiming to be passengers on the bus had testified in front of the police. They said it was not an issue of harassment, but a dispute over seats as the girls had been occupying a seat allotted to a sick woman. A longer unedited video had been found on the internet, in which the girls asked a third girl, who had filmed the incident on their phone, to return it. Later another man came forward and claimed that he had been similarly accused of molestation by the girls and he had to pay ₹20,000 to have the charges dropped.

On 8 December, the girls offered to undergo a narcoanalysis test to prove that their version of the events were true. The girls had failed the polygraph test conducted on them, while the accused had passed it. On 18 January, 2015, the girls made a complaint to Suman Dahiya, vice-chairperson of the Haryana State Commission for Women, saying that they were being pressured to withdraw the case by authorities and that they were asked obscene questions during the polygraph test. In May 2015, the sisters complained to the police that someone was posting morphed pictures of them on social media.

On 4 March 2017, the boys were acquitted of all charges. However, the boys reportedly continued to suffer from the effects of the controversy, failing employment qualifications due to the negative light they were painted in.

== Events ==
Location of Rohtak in India

=== First video ===
In late November 2014, a video went viral on the internet in India. It showed two sisters, Pooja and Aarti from Kharkhauda, fighting three men on a moving Haryana Roadways bus near Rohtak, Haryana. According to initial reports, the sisters, final year students of Bachelor of Computer Application in IC Women's Government College, were waiting for the bus to return home, when two young men from a nearby village allegedly began harassing them. They also followed them on to their bus and called a third man who joined them en route. One of the men allegedly wrote his phone number on a paper and threw it at them and asked them to pick it up. The girls changed buses, the youth allegedly followed them and continued harassing despite a female co-passenger's objections. When one of the men grabbed Aarti's neck, her sister Pooja used her belt to assault the men. The bus slowed at a speed breaker and the three men ejected the girls. One of the girls threw a brick at the men which hit one of them. The bus continued to move and passengers did not interfere. The girls called the women's helpline but got no response. They returned home, told their parents about the event, and filed a case at the Rohtak Sadar police station. The video was allegedly taken by a co-passenger on a cellphone camera. The event took place on 28 November 2014.

=== Reactions ===
On 30 November, the very day of the incident, the local police arrested the three accused and charged them under Section 354 (assault or criminal force with intent to outrage woman's modesty) and Section 323 (voluntarily causing hurt) of the Indian Penal Code.

Reactions in support of the girls and expressing disgust for the boys came thick and fast, beginning the same day: Haryana Women's Commission vice-chairperson Suman Dahiya said that she would visit the locality. Annie Raja, the general secretary of the National Federation of Indian Women, praised the girls and said it was the responsibility of the bystanders to help them.

The next day, 1 December 2014, Haryana Chief Minister Manohar Lal Khattar praised the bravery of the girls and announced a cash prize of ₹51,000 to be given to each of the girls at a function on Republic Day. Union minister Uma Bharati said that the all girls should respond like these girls did to harassment. Union Minister Nirmala Sitharaman praised the girls and said that the viral video showed the risk women face even in public spaces. Lalitha Kumaramangalam, chairperson to the National Commission for Women, praised the bravery of the girls brave and called upon the government to take appropriate action.

On the same day, and hardly 24 hours after the incident, the Indian Army sources said that two of the men, who had been selected in the army physical test, will not longer be allowed to appear in the written exam. Defense Minister Manohar Parrikar said that such men had no place in the Indian Army. A local court suspended the bus driver and conductor, and sent the three men to judiciary custody.

By 2 December, TV channels had picked up the story and were visiting the girls' home to interview them. The girls had claimed that the video was taken by a pregnant woman, who was the only co-passenger who had tried to help them. But, the woman could not be traced. The police also said that not a single eye-witness had come forward.

On being interviewed, the father of one of accused said that all three were 19 years old and were pursuing Bachelor of Arts from the Jat College in Rohtak. Two of the boys, Kuldeep and Mohit, were returning after appearing in an army recruitment exam. One of the boys was asked by a sick old woman to buy her a ticket at the bus stop. On boarding the bus, they found the two girls occupying the seats allotted to the old woman. Upon asking them to vacate the seat, an argument began and girls started to hit them. When the boys retaliated, the girls began to capture it on video. The third accused, Deepak boarded the bus later and got caught in the fight. Four women of Asan village, from which the accused hail, said that the boys had not harassed the girls and it was a dispute over seats.

=== Second video ===
On 2 December, a second video went viral on the internet, which showed the girls hitting another boy in Rohtak. The girls claimed that the video was a month older, it was taken in HUDA park, Rohtak. The girls claimed that they were teased by some boys sitting on a bench and after one of the girls started hitting them, they fled. The girls denied that they had released the second video for publicity and said that they had not filed a case for that incident because the accused boys had fled. The girls said the video was probably taken by a bystander and as they always respond to harassers in the same manner, there were probably more videos of them out there.

By 5 December, six women claiming to be passengers on the bus had testified to police. They said it was not an issue of harassment, but a dispute over seats as the girls had been occupying a seat allotted to a sick woman. The government put the prize on hold after the development. On 6 December, Kiron Kher, a Member of the Parliament, said that she trusted the girls' version of the story.

On 8 December, the girls offered to undergo a narcoanalysis test to prove that their version of the events were true. The girls were later given police security, after they claimed that they were being pressured by the accused to withdraw the case. By now the accused had been released on bail. By this time, a third video had emerged which showed one of the accused being beaten by his father in a police station and being asked to apologize to the girls. Another man came forward and claimed that he had been similarly accused of molestation. He had to pay ₹20,000 to have the charges dropped.

On 11 December, various non-Jat groups gave their support to the girls, who belong to an OBC caste, and said the government should reinstate the cash prize. The accused were revealed to be of Jat caste. By this time, a longer unedited video had been found on the internet, in which the girls asked a third girl, who had filmed the incident on their phone, to return it. A witness also came forward claiming that she saw the girls ask a third girl to make the video.

On 13 December, the girls told the reporters that they had considered committing suicide due to the pressure and endless scrutiny from the society. They also said that they would pursue a defamation suit against those who had given false testimony to malign their image.

=== Trial and investigation ===
On 15 December 2014, the local court gave permission to the police to run polygraph tests on the two girls and the witnesses. On 7 January, one of accused, Kuldeep, was not allotted a roll number to appear in the written exams for the army recruitment. An official of the Army Recruitment Office said that they cannot allow him to appear the exam, as the case was still under trial. Kuldeep had already cleared the physical and medical tests.

On 18 January, the girls made a complaint to Suman Dahiya, vice-chairperson of the Haryana State Commission for Women, saying that they were being pressured to withdraw the case by authorities and that they were asked obscene questions during the polygraph test. Around 19 February 2015, a local daily reported that the girls had failed the polygraph test, while the accused had passed it.

On 4 March in reply to an RTI request, the Maharshi Dayanand University (MDU) said that the sisters had sought a transfer from Kanya Mahavidyalaya, Kharkhauda to the Women's Government College, Rohtak, by claiming that they were getting married in Rohtak. As proof they had submitted a marriage invitation which gave the date of marriage as 4 February 2014. But while applying for classes, they stated themselves as unmarried. The RTI request was filed by one of the legal counsels of the accused, Pardeep Malik. Sandeep Rathee, another counsel for the accused, demanded charges of fraud to be filed. The counsel for the sister, A. S. Pawar, said he was unaware of this and that had no relations with the molestation case.

In May 2015, the sisters complained to the police that someone has posted morphed pictures of them on the social media. According to the sisters, the police arrested one Nitin Kumar, a resident of Darotha village, on 17 May 2015 after much delay and reluctance. On 18 May 2015, the girls met with Inspector General of Police Shrikant Jadhav to complain that the police investigation had not yet be completed, and they requested that both the original and new morphed image case be transferred to the Crime Branch for quicker conclusion.

Also in May 2015, the sisters said in an interview with Geetanjali Gayatri of The Tribune, that they had been they attracting undue attention where ever they go. They said that their college was receiving large numbers of RTI applications regarding their attendance and grades. One of the sisters, Aarti, told the reporter that they would have been better off dead like the Moga girl, referring to an incident in which a girl died after being thrown off of a bus in the Moga district. In the same month, Divya Arya of BBC Hindi travelled to the town. Pooja told Arya that they had no intention of fighting back in the future if they are harassed. They also said that they were asked embarrassing questions during the polygraph test.

In June 2015, it was reported that newer morphed images of the sisters continued to appear on Facebook and WhatsApp. The police said they were investigating the case. The sisters also said that they do not trust the polygraph test results as they were leaked. The Superintendent of Police of Rohtak, Shashank Anand, said that he will present the test report in court when the court asks for it.

In August 2015, the police completed its investigation and filed the chargesheet. The 200-page chargesheet contained statements of 50 witnesses, and included the report of the polygraph test. The media reports said that the statement of the woman who shot the video was also included. She had allegedly said that no molestation had taken place and mobile phone was given to her by one of the girls. The police said the polygraph test of the accused boys was found to be credible. The legal counsel of the girls, Attar Singh Panwar speaking to Hindustan Times, accused the police of bias in the investigation. He said the polygraph test might be fabricated by the police and suggested that the case should be handed over to the Central Bureau of Investigation (CBI).

== Judgement ==
The court delivered its judgement on 4 March 2017. All the charges were dismissed and the young men were held innocent. They were acquitted of all the charges against them.

== See also ==
- Jasleen Kaur harassment controversy
- Trial by media
- Eve teasing
