= Heritage Xperiential Learning School, Gurgaon =

Coordinates: 28.410434048°N 77.090896470°E

Heritage Xperiential Learning School, Gurugram

Location
- Sector 62; Gurgaon, Haryana, 122011; India

Information
- Former name: The Heritage School, Gurgaon (THS)
- School type: Independent co-educational
- Established: 2003; 23 years ago
- Founder: N.C. Jain, Manit Jain
- Faculty: 350
- Grades: Nursery to 12
- Area: 72,942 m^{2} (785,141 sq ft)
- Website: heritagexperiential.org

Heritage Xperiential Learning School is an independent, co-educational experiential learning school based in the Indian district of Gurgaon in the state of Haryana. The school is affiliated with the Central Board of Secondary Education (CBSE), the International General Certificate of Secondary Education (IGCSE) and the International Baccalaureate's Diploma Program (IBDP).

== Raahgiri Days ==
The Raahgiri initiative was started in the school by sixth-grade pupils working on a project to make Gurgaon a more cycle-friendly city. In conjunction with regional civil society organizations, the idea later developed into a campaign for non-motorized days and became known as Raahgiri Day. The days are currently conducted in 11 Indian cities, and the movement is still growing.

== The Muskan Project ==
The Heritage Xperiential Learning School has also been collaborating with the Haryana State Government to raise the standard of education in the state. Under the Muskan pilot project, it adopted a public elementary school where it exchanges teaching methods, creative concepts, and new ideas with the faculty.

== Climate change ==
Students began rallying for the cause of climate change, and on Friday, March 16, 2019, students from 1,787 sites across 112 different nations marched in protest. Nearly 400 students gathered in Delhi, chanting and waving placards. In addition, students from local schools gathered at Central Park in Connaught Place to engage in the global "Fridays for Future" climate change protest.

The protest was also held in Gurgaon. Students from Heritage Xperiential Learning School Gurgaon, who are also a part of the school's center for active citizenship to support the preservation of the Aravallis, were also present at the protest.

== Notable alumni ==
- Manav Singh who committed suicide after being falsely accused of sexual harassment by Bhavleen Kaur.

== Annual Summits ==
Year	Theme	Start date	End date
2021	The Phoenix	29/09/2021	01/10/2021

== Awards ==
- NDTV Award nominee for top school in North India
- Ashoka Changemaker School
- Education world school ranking, 2019-20
