= Suicide of Amanda Todd =

2012 suicide of Canadian student

- A screenshot of Todd's YouTube video
- Date: October 10, 2012; 14 years ago
- Location: Port Coquitlam, British Columbia, Canada
- Type: Suicide by hanging
- Cause: Online harassment and blackmail
- Burial: Robinson Memorial Park Cemetery, Coquitlam, Canada
- Inquest: British Columbia Coroners Service
- Coroner: Barb McLintock
- Convicted: Aydin Coban
- Trial: June 6, 2022 – August 5, 2022
- Verdict: Guilty on all counts
- Convictions: Extortion; Criminal harassment; Communication with a young person to commit a sexual offence; Possession of child pornography (2 counts) (Note: Previous charges in the Netherlands: Extortion; Luring; Criminal harassment; Possession of child pornography for the purpose of distribution)
- Sentence: 6 years in prison (reduced from 13 years)

Amanda Michelle Todd (November 27, 1996 – October 10, 2012) was a 15-year-old Canadian student and victim of cyberbullying who died by suicide in her home in Port Coquitlam, British Columbia. A month before her death, Todd posted a video on YouTube in which she used a series of flashcards to tell her experience of being blackmailed into exposing her breasts via webcam on the livestreaming and online chat service BlogTV, and of being bullied and physically assaulted. The video went viral after her death, resulting in international media attention. The original video – uploaded on September 7, 2012 – had 15.5 million views as of July 4, 2025, although mirrored copies of the video had received tens of millions of additional views shortly after her death; additionally, a YouTube video by React has a video of teens reacting to Todd's video that has garnered 44.9 million views as of July 4, 2025, and various videos from news agencies around the world regarding the case have registered millions more. The Royal Canadian Mounted Police and British Columbia Coroners Service launched investigations into the suicide.

In response to her death, the Premier of British Columbia made an online statement of condolence and suggested a national discussion on criminalizing cyberbullying. A motion was also introduced in the Canadian House of Commons to propose a study of the scope of bullying in Canada and for more funding and support for anti-bullying organizations. Todd's mother, Carol, established the Amanda Todd Trust, receiving donations to support anti-bullying awareness education and programs for young people with mental health problems.

A Dutch-Turkish man, Aydin Coban, who was already imprisoned for sexual blackmail in the Netherlands, was extradited to Canada to face trial on charges of harassing and sexually extorting Todd before her suicide. On August 5, 2022, the jury found Coban guilty on all counts, and he was sentenced to 13 years in prison on October 14, 2022. On December 21, 2023, a Dutch judge reduced his sentence to six years in prison. On January 28, 2025, Coban's bid to scrap his Canadian sentence was rejected.

== Background and suicide ==
On September 7, 2012, Todd posted a 9-minute YouTube video titled My story: Struggling, bullying, suicide, self-harm, which showed her using a series of flashcards to tell of her experiences being bullied. The video went viral after her death on October 10, 2012, receiving over 1,600,000 views by October 13, 2012, with news websites from around the world linking to it.

Facebook photo of Todd

During the video, Todd writes that when she was in 7th grade (2009–10), around the same time she moved in with her father, she used video chat to meet new people over the Internet and received compliments on her looks. After a stranger repeatedly asked her for over a year to bare her breasts, Todd did so on a webcam stream, and the person saved frames using screen capturing. He later blackmailed her by threatening to give the topless photo to her friends unless she gave him a "show". She also was featured briefly on the Daily Capper on BlogTV, a pedophile-run news show utilizing animation of the character Dora Smarmy from the HBO Family series Crashbox that tracked children who were groomed into doing sex acts on camera and encouraged their continued exploitation. An episode of Daily Capper a month after Todd's death claimed to oppose her abusers and reveal evidence that incriminates them.

Todd wrote that during the 2010 Christmas break, police informed her that the photo was circulating on the Internet. She wrote that she experienced anxiety, depression, and panic disorder due to having been sexually exploited online and cyberbullied. Her family moved to a new home, where Todd said she began using alcohol and other drugs.

A year later, Todd's blackmailer reappeared, creating a Facebook profile that used the topless photo as its profile image and contacting classmates at her new school. Again, Todd was teased, eventually changing schools for a second time. She wrote that she began chatting to "an old guy friend" who contacted her. The friend invited Todd to his house, where they had sex while his girlfriend was on vacation. The following week, the boy's girlfriend and a group of about 15 others confronted Todd at school, shouting insults, with the boy's girlfriend punching her; Todd fell to the ground, then lay in a ditch, where her father found her. After the attack, Todd attempted suicide by drinking bleach, but survived after being rushed to the hospital to have her stomach pumped. "It killed me inside and I thought I was gonna actually die", Todd commented in her video.

After returning home, Todd discovered abusive messages about her suicide attempt posted to Facebook. In March 2012, her family moved to another city to start afresh, but Todd was unable to escape the past. According to her mother, "Every time she moved schools he would go undercover and become a Facebook friend. What the guy did was he went online to the kids who went to [the new school] and said that he was going to be a new student — that he was starting school the following week and that he wanted some friends and could they friend him on Facebook. He eventually gathered people's names and sent Todd's video to her new school", including students, teachers, and parents. Six months later, further messages and abuse were still being posted to social networking sites. With Todd's mental state worsening, she began to engage in self-mutilation and cutting. Despite taking her prescribed antidepressants and receiving counseling, she overdosed and was hospitalized for two days.

Todd was taunted by other students at her school for her low grades, a consequence of a language-based learning disability, and for the time she spent in the hospital to treat her severe depression. "It didn't really help that after she got out of the hospital recently some kids started calling her 'psycho' and saying she had been in the crazy hospital," her mother said. "She went to the hospital, she had therapy, she had counseling, she was on a good track. On the day she gets out, that happens. I shake my head and I think, 'Are kids really that nasty, do they really not think, what if it was them?'"

On October 10, 2012, at about 6:00 PM (PDT), Todd's body was found hanging at her home. At the time of her death, Todd was a 10th grade student at CABE Secondary in Coquitlam, a school that caters to students who have experienced social and behaviour issues in previous educational settings.

== Investigation, arrest, trial, and conviction ==
A preliminary investigation by British Columbia Coroners Service showed that Todd's death was a suicide. The cause of death was reported in some media as hanging, but the exact cause of death had not been released.

The Royal Canadian Mounted Police (RCMP) and British Columbia Coroners Service put 20 full-time investigators on the case. The Coquitlam and Ridge Meadows serious crime teams cooperated in a full investigation, conducting interviews and examining factors that might have contributed to Todd's death. Investigators reviewed content at social media sites and actively monitored pages.

The Canadian national organization Cybertip.ca reported having received a tip about Todd nearly a year before her suicide. The anti-child-exploitation group stated that, in November 2011, a concerned citizen reported that images of Todd were in circulation on the Internet. That information was provided to law enforcement and child welfare agencies. According to the CBC news program The Fifth Estate, the RCMP were repeatedly informed that Todd was being sexually extorted by an adult male, and in response the RCMP told the family there was "nothing that could be done" about it. According to the Ontario Provincial Police (OPP), however, the crime of sextortion can be investigated quite successfully.

After an investigation by Facebook's security unit, whose report was forwarded by U.S. authorities to the Child Exploitation and Online Protection Centre attached to the British National Crime Agency, and then to Dutch authorities, in January 2014 Dutch police arrested a man in a case involving multiple victims in the Netherlands, U.K., and Canada, having installed spyware on his computers; "chilling" chat logs of extortion, numerous images of child pornography, and 5,800 bookmarked names that served as a database of potential victims and their social networks were found. In April 2014, it was reported that Dutch authorities charged a 35-year-old man of dual Dutch and Turkish citizenship (identified only as "Aydin C." in the Netherlands in accordance with Dutch privacy laws) with indecent assault and possession of child pornography. That same month, the RCMP announced that the man had been charged with extortion, internet luring, criminal harassment and possession and distribution of child pornography for his alleged offenses against Todd and other child victims. Todd's mother expressed her gratitude for the police, but also said that she believed more than one person was involved. On January 28, 2015, CBC News said that Aydin Coban had written an open letter proclaiming his innocence.

Dutch authorities dropped some child pornography charges in October 2015; Coban's case went to trial in February 2017, and concluded on March 16, 2017. He faced 72 charges of sexual assault and extortion in the Netherlands involving 39 alleged victims (34 young women and five men in countries as various as Britain, Canada, Norway and the U.S., some of whom had been harassed for years); eventually convicted and sentenced on the Dutch charges of internet fraud and blackmail, he faced five separate Canadian charges related to Todd (herself not one of the 39), and it was anticipated that he would be extradited to Canada no sooner than the middle of 2018 whilst serving his Dutch sentence of 10 years and 8 months. Carol Todd expressed relief at the sentence.

In December 2019, it was reported that Canadian authorities were preparing for the extradition. Due to problems obtaining travel documents for Coban and his lawyer, Robert Malewicz, the extradition was delayed until December 2020. The trial began in the Supreme Court of British Columbia on June 6, 2022. On August 5, 2022, the jury found Coban guilty of all charges. On October 14, 2022, Coban was sentenced to 13 years in prison by the presiding judge, who used her discretion to add a year to the 12 years sought by the Crown attorney, citing aggravating factors including the sophistication of the blackmail scheme, the widespread distribution of Todd's images, and Coban's lack of remorse.

On December 21, 2023, a Dutch judge reduced Coban's sentence for his crimes against Todd to six years in prison. It will be served consecutively to an 11-year prison sentence for sexually extorting 33 other victims. On January 28, 2025, the Supreme Court of the Netherlands rejected Coban's bid to scrap his Canadian sentence.

== Reaction ==
Todd's suicide received widespread international media coverage, much of which included a link to her YouTube video and an email address provided by the RCMP appealing for information from the public. Within 24 hours of the appeal, over 400 tips were received. The RCMP has stated that its investigation was hindered by the amount of false information in online postings after Todd's death, and by scams claiming to raise money for her family.

On October 19, 2012, a series of vigils were held across Canada and internationally to remember Todd and other victims of bullying. A minute of silence was observed by a quarter of a million students in the Toronto District School Board district. The same day, Todd's mother was a guest of the 2012 We Day event in Vancouver, a week after Todd's death. Bullying had been scheduled as a topic before Todd's death and was addressed by speakers Magic Johnson, musician and anti-bullying advocate Demi Lovato and British Columbia Premier Christy Clark.

Initially, Todd's mother was denied entry to an anti-bullying conference for fear that her presence would upset other attendees. The family was invited to attend later events.

On November 18, 2012, 600 people gathered at a final farewell ceremony for Todd at Red Robinson Show Theatre in Coquitlam, near her home. Carol Todd told the gathering that her daughter had left behind "a larger-than-life message that has sparked the world and has made it open its eyes, its ears and its hearts".

Internet hacktivist group Anonymous alleged that a 32-year-old man was Todd's blackmailer and main tormentor. The group published the Vancouver-area man's name and address on the Internet, resulting in the man's receipt of online threats of vigilante justice. After investigating the tip, police determined that the allegations were unfounded, and said that "false information that is being spread by people who appear to be trying to use Amanda's story to do harm or make a profit" was one of the challenges they faced.

According to an interview with the Vancouver Sun, the publication of his identity on social media sites resulted in over 50 emails and thousands of Facebook death threats. A member of Anonymous had attempted to dissuade the group from publishing the information, saying that they had the right person but that the address belonged to someone else, not the target. Slate reported that the person who was responsible turned out to be 19, not 32.

=== Mainstream media ===
Michelle Dean of The New Yorker compared Todd's death to the suicide of Tyler Clementi, an LGBT student at Rutgers University who jumped to his death from the George Washington Bridge after his roommate encouraged friends to watch a live stream of Clementi kissing another man. In an early piece questioning the assumptions of perpetrators of nonconsensual pornography, she quotes Mary Anne Franks:

Women have become, as Franks put it, "unwilling avatars", unable to control their own images online, and then told to put up with it for the sake of "freedom", for the good of the community. And then they are incorrectly told, even if the public is behind them, that they have no remedies in the law. They are shouted down by people with a view of freedom of speech more literal than that held by any judge.

and concludes:

...[But] whatever Amanda Todd might have been thinking, whatever else might be true, she did get one thing out of this: Amanda Todd did manage to, just once, tell her own story. She got to drown out the version of her that strangers had put out on the Web. It's a small comfort. But it was perhaps the only one she had left.

Vancouver Magazine titled a piece on Todd "The Girl Who Woke Up the World"; in 2012 she was the third-most Googled person, and by 2013, vigils had been held in 38 countries. Her mother continues to be the subject of cyber-stalking.

=== Social media ===
After Todd's suicide, more than one million Facebook users "liked" her Facebook memorial page. Mingled among the positive support and comments are attacks and images from strangers and people claiming to be her former classmates. After one man's derogatory Facebook comments about Todd's death were reported to his employer, the Grafton-Fraser Mr. Big & Tall clothing chain, it was confirmed that he was no longer an employee.

On October 19, 2012, police in New Zealand said they were questioning a 17-year-old boy from Raglan who allegedly posted "inappropriate and disturbing images" on a memorial page for Todd. Police removed the images and shut down the boy's Facebook page.

Todd's suicide engendered the Drink Bleach Internet meme almost immediately, a meme her mother regarded as unhelpful to those at risk. Four years after her death, she was included in a depiction of a "Suicide Squad" of celebrities that took their own lives (along with Adolf Hitler, Robin Williams, and Kurt Cobain in one depiction). "Suicide" memes rose to popularity quickly around this time due to the release of the 2016 DC Universe movie Suicide Squad.

=== Amanda Todd Legacy Society ===
Carol Todd established the Amanda Todd Trust at the Royal Bank of Canada, receiving donations to support anti-bullying awareness education and programs for young people with mental health problems. (A week after Todd's death, ABC News reported that fraudulent websites had been set up claiming to solicit donations, quoting a statement by RCMP Sergeant Peter Thiessen: "Taking advantage of a family's grief is despicable...We want to get the word out that there is one real account and anyone who is interested can make a donation at any RBC branch to the Amanda Todd Trust Account.") It has since been incorporated as a nonprofit colloquially known as Amanda Todd Legacy, with a particular outreach on the mental health issues of adolescents on occasions such as World Mental Health Day on October 10. The Amanda Todd Legacy Award was established in conjunction with the Douglas College Foundation in 2016; three students are awarded $1,000 annually toward their studies. Amanda Todd Legacy and Carol Todd have also participated in LGBT advocacy under the aegis of Kids Help Phone, Canada's 24-hour hotline for youth in crisis.

Carol Todd is close friends with Leah Parsons, the mother of Rehtaeh Parsons, and they frequently network on cyberbullying issues. The two women often have speaking engagements about their respective daughters with an emphasis on respect, acceptance, forgiveness and dignity.

On March 24, 2018, composer Jocelyn Morlock won the Juno Award for Classical Composition of the Year for a piece inspired by Amanda Todd; she was joined onstage by Carol Todd.

=== Legislative impact ===
In 2012, parliamentarian Dany Morin of the New Democratic Party introduced a motion in the House of Commons of Canada in response to Todd's death. The motion proposed a study of the scope of bullying in Canada, and more funding and support for anti-bullying organizations. It was also intended to lay the groundwork for a national strategy to prevent bullying. Morin himself had experienced bullying in school.

In November 2013, Justice Minister Peter MacKay of the Conservative Party introduced Bill C-13, anti-cyberbullying and revenge porn legislation. Carol Todd criticized its warrantless access provisions, saying, "I don't want to see our children victimized again by losing privacy rights". The definition of cyberbullying itself has been a matter of considerable debate, as have the bill's privacy provisions (particularly in regard to encryption technologies). It went into effect on March 9, 2015. It had largely been promoted as protecting minors but applies to all ages.

== See also ==
- Cyberstalking legislation
- Online harassment
- Suicide intervention
- Suicide prevention
- Suicide of Manav Singh
- Suicide of Megan Meier
