= Jasleen Kaur harassment controversy =

2015 false sexual harassment accusation in Delhi

The Jasleen Kaur harassment controversy stemmed from the allegation of sexual harassment made by Jasleen Kaur against Sarvjeet Singh in 2015 and the events that followed. In August 2015, Jasleen Kaur, a woman from Delhi posted, a photo of Sarvjeet Singh on Facebook, alleging that Singh had sexually harassed her. The post went viral on social media in India, garnering widespread attention. National celebrities and politicians supported Kaur for raising her voice against eve-teasing and sexual harassment on social media.

The then Chief Minister of Delhi, Arvind Kejriwal also tweeted in support of Kaur, calling it ‘an act of bravery’. Singh was arrested on charges of sexual harassment (of which he would later be acquitted) the next day. The following day, Singh posted bail. Indian media, including national news channels, labelled Singh as a "National Pervert" and "Delhi ka Darinda" (Delhi's predator). Singh acknowledged that there had been a disagreement between him and Kaur, but denied harassing Kaur. A few days after the incident, an eyewitness vouched for Singh's innocence which brought credibility to Singh's account. In October 2019, an Indian court acquitted Singh of all the charges and he was pronounced innocent. Kaur responded that she will continue to fight, while Singh filed a petition seeking criminal enquiry against Kaur for false accusations, which was later dismissed by Delhi High Court.

The event brought media attention to misuse of laws by women in India, including cases of false rape accusation.

== Events ==
=== Background ===
On August 23, 2015, Kaur, a former student of Delhi University posted a picture of a man and alleged that he passed obscene comments at her during an argument on the street. After the post went viral, Singh was arrested by local police under sections 354A (Sexual harassment), 506 (Punishment for criminal intimidation) and 509 (Word, gesture or act intended to insult the modesty of a woman) of the Indian Penal Code.

==== Facebook post ====
The post made by Kaur on August 23, 2015:

This man (misnomer) made obscene comments on me today at around 8 pm near Aggarwal, Tilak Nagar. He was on a silver Royal Enfield, vehicle number - DL 4S CE 3623. When I told him that im clicking his picture and i'm going to file a complaint against him, he responded by posing for the picture and said- "Jo kar sakti hai kar le. Complaint karke dikha, fir dekhiyo kya karta hun main".

But there was something that is disturbing me much more than his obscene remarks- the fact that it was a red traffic signal and 20 other people heard what he was telling me. Yes, no one minded. No one intervened. No one stood up for me. I decided to stand up for myself and lodged a complaint in Tilak Nagar police station with his photo and vehicle number.

Share his picture and vehicle number as much as you can to pin this creep. (only if you care).

Today he had the audacity to say these things to me, tomorrow he will have the audacity to move one step ahead and do it.

PS- I could've written here exactly what he said in his comments, but i don't want FB to remove my post.

==== Kaur's account ====
Kaur stated that Singh was trying to jump the red signal. She asked him to follow the traffic rules to which Singh replied with obscene comments.

The court later observed the complainant had made material alterations to her previous statements, concluding that "the testimony of the complainant is not trustworthy and casts serious doubt on the case of the prosecution."

=== Reactions ===
The Facebook post shared by Kaur on August 23, 2015, immediately went viral on social media in India with over 100,000 shares.

Reactions in support of Kaur, lauding her supposed bravery, and expressive of disgust and contempt for Singh came thick and fast, beginning the same day.

The next day, on August 24, the then Delhi Chief Minister Arvind Kejriwal tweeted lauding her supposed bravery asking all the girls of Delhi to speak up against such unacceptable acts. The then Delhi Commission for Woman (DCW) Chief, Swati Maliwal also expressed support for Kaur.

The Deputy Commissioner of Police (West) said that she will be given 5000 rupees for her supposed bravery.

Actress Sonakshi Sinha also expressed support for Kaur. However she later tweeted apologizing to Singh for her presumption of guilt.

Soon after Kaur's viral post, Singh stated he had lost his job because of the media coverage and that he couldn't find any other stable source of income.

=== Times Now fined ===
The news channel Times Now was fined a sum of Rs. 50,000 by the News Broadcasting Standards Authority (NBSA), and was asked to apologize on-air. The fine was levied because, per NBSA, Times Now had interviewed the accused in an “aggressive, intimidating, and browbeating style, and the telecast of the interview with tag-lines treating the accused as guilty".

== Judgment ==
On October 24, 2019, four years after the incident, the court passed the judgment. All the charges were dismissed, and Singh was held innocent. Jasleen Kaur didn't appear in court for the hearings, despite repeated summons. Jasleen's family claimed that because of the online abuse she received in India, she had to move to Canada to pursue higher education. Jasleen denied receiving any summons; while her lawyer accepted that there were summons, he said that she cannot be forced to appear, adding that her father had been appearing in court.

After being acquitted Sarvjeet Singh filed a petition seeking criminal enquiry against Jasleen Kaur and her parents for false accusations and helping her to flee, but Delhi High Court dismissed the petition and held that “loss of reputation is not sufficient” to initiate a criminal enquiry under Section 340 CrPC. However, the court granted Singh the liberty to initiate appropriate legal proceedings for defamation caused by Kaur's FIR.

== See also ==
- Rohtak sisters viral video controversy
- Manav Singh
