= KidGuard =

Computer surveillance

- Release: 2016
- Operating system: iOS and Android
- Type: Parental monitoring
- Website: www.kidguard.com

KidGuard is a parental monitoring application for iOS and Android mobile phones. The application uses proprietary software to help parents monitor their children’s text messages, browser history, social media activity, stored videos or photos, emails, and phone GPS location.

== History ==
KidGuard was developed by a Los Angeles-based team and officially released in 2016. After KidGuard's launch, the application received coverage on ABC News and Inc. Magazine.

In 2017, KidGuard partnered with the startup incubator OnRamp Lab, located in Taipei, Taiwan. The same year, international security consultant Gene Yu joined the KidGuard advisory board to aid with kidnapping response and prevention measures.

In 2020, Kidguard was the victim of a data breach which released customer data.

== Features ==
Following the software as a service model, KidGuard is run through a web application that allows a parent to view all activity on a child's phone, including:

- Reading sent and received text messages, including deleted messages and texts sent via popular alternative messaging applications such as WhatsApp.
- Accessing browser history, call history and application usage, including duration and frequency.
- Viewing all photos and videos saved to a child's phone,
- Using a smartphone's GPS to track location, as well as setting geo-fencing to alert parents.

KidGuard also includes a feature it calls a "Situation 360 Report," in which the application automatically creates a report to aid law enforcement in the event of a child's disappearance. The report includes a full profile of a child's recent locations, behavior and message history.

== Controversy ==
Critics have raised concerns about the potential capability of KidGuard and its competitors to violate privacy laws or to be used as a tool by stalkers and abusers.

In May 2018, KidGuard was featured in a New York Times article which criticized the application's developers for running advertisements aimed at adults attempting to spy on their spouses or discover infidelity. After KidGuard was contacted for comment, a spokesman responded that these advertisements had been developed by a marketing partner. All content relating to infidelity was subsequently removed from the KidGuard website.

== Philanthropy ==
KidGuard maintains an annual "KidGuard for Education Essay Scholarship" for high school students in the United States. The scholarship is awarded to an undisclosed number of participants, based on the results of an essay content whose topics concern online safety and cyberbullying.

In 2017, KidGuard donated $25,000 in grants to 18 non-profit organizations focused on child safety and online threat prevention. The largest grant of $5,000 was awarded to the Megan Meier Foundation.

== See also ==
- Parental controls
- mSpy
