= Suicide of Megan Meier =

Suicide of American cyberbullied teenager

Megan Meier
- Megan Meier in 2005
- Born: Megan Taylor Meier; November 6, 1992; O'Fallon, Missouri, U.S.
- Died: October 17, 2006 (aged 13); Dardenne Prairie, Missouri, U.S.
- Cause of death: Suicide by hanging
- Resting place: Saint Charles Memorial Gardens, St. Charles, Missouri, U.S.
- Occupation: Student
- Website: meganmeierfoundation.org

Megan Taylor Meier (November 6, 1992 – October 17, 2006) was an American teenager who died by suicide by hanging herself at the age of 13. A year later, Meier's parents prompted an investigation into the matter, and her suicide was attributed to cyberbullying through the social networking website MySpace. Lori Drew, Meier's neighbor and the mother of Meier's classmate, was found guilty of cyberbullying in the 2009 case United States v. Drew, but the conviction was later overturned.

== Background ==
Megan Taylor Meier was born on November 6, 1992, to Christina "Tina" Meier and Ronald Meier in O'Fallon, Missouri. Ronald Meier died in Delray Beach, Florida on December 7, 2022 at the age of 52.

From the third grade in 2001–02, after Meier had told her mother she had wanted to kill herself, Meier had been under the care of a psychiatrist. She had been prescribed citalopram (an antidepressant that has a possible side effect of increasing suicide risk in young people), methylphenidate, and the atypical antipsychotic ziprasidone. Meier had been diagnosed with attention deficit disorder, depression, and self-esteem issues regarding her weight. Meier was described by her parents as a "bubbly, goofy" girl who enjoyed spending time with her friends and family.

Meier attended Fort Zumwalt public schools, including Pheasant Point Elementary School and Fort Zumwalt West Middle School in nearby O'Fallon, Missouri. Meier befriended the popular girls so that the boys who picked on her would stop. The girls soon turned on Meier and the bullying became even worse than before. For eighth grade in 2006, her parents enrolled her at Immaculate Conception Catholic School in Dardenne Prairie.

Soon after opening her own MySpace account despite her mother's objections, Meier received a friend request from a fellow user claiming to be a 16-year-old boy named Josh Evans. Meier and "Josh" became online friends but never met in person or spoke to each other. She thought "Josh" was attractive. As Meier began to exchange messages with this person, her family said she seemed to have had her "spirits lifted", but eventually her mother became concerned about Megan becoming so infatuated with someone she had never met in person, especially since "Josh" would always have some reason why he could not meet her in person, call her or give her his address. This person claimed to have moved to the nearby city of O'Fallon, to have been homeschooled, and to not yet have a phone number.

A 16-year-old male named "Josh Evans" was registered on the account that was later attributed to bullying Meier. However, Lori Drew, the mother of Sarah Drew, a former friend of Meier, later admitted to creating the MySpace account. At the time of the suicide, the Drew and Meier families were neighbors, living four doors apart.

Drew was aided by her daughter and by Ashley Grills, an 18-year-old employee of Lori. Lori and several others ran the hoaxed account. Witnesses testified that the women intended to use Meier's messages sent to "Josh" to get information about her and later humiliate Meier in retribution for Meier allegedly spreading gossip about Drew's daughter.

== Suicide ==
Suicide of Megan Meier
- Location: Dardenne Prairie, Missouri, U.S.
- Type: Teenage suicide, hanging
- Cause: Online harassment
- Deaths: Megan Taylor Meier, aged 13
- Accused: Lori Shreeves Drew; Sarah Drew; Ashley Grills (confessed)
- Convicted: Lori Shreeves Drew (convictions overturned)
- Charges: Lori Drew: Conspiracy; Felony violations of the Computer Fraud and Abuse Act (3 counts); Unauthorized access to computers (lesser included offenses; 3 counts)
- Verdict: Hung jury on the count of conspiracy; Not guilty of felony violations of the CFAA; Guilty of lesser-included offenses of unauthorized computer access (overturned by trial judge George Wu)

On October 16, 2006, the tone of the messages changed. After Meier got home from school, Tina Meier signed into MySpace for Meier. She was in a hurry because she had to take her younger daughter, Allison, to the orthodontist. Before she could get to the door, Meier was upset. "Josh" sent troubling messages to Meier, including one that said, "I don't want to be friends with you anymore. You're not a nice person." More messages of this type were sent, some of Meier's messages were shared with others, and bulletins were posted about her. Tina told her daughter to sign off and went to the orthodontist with Allison. She called her daughter to ask her if she had signed off, and Meier had not and was sobbing hysterically.

When Tina got home, she was furious that Meier had not signed off. Tina was shocked at the vulgar language her daughter was firing back. Meier then told her mother, "You're supposed to be my mom! You're supposed to be on my side!", and then left the computer and went upstairs. According to Ronald Meier, and a neighbor who had discussed the hoax with Drew, the final message sent by "Josh" read, "Everybody in O'Fallon knows who you are. You are a bad person and everybody hates you. Have a shitty rest of your life. The world would be a better place without you".

Meier responded by saying, "You're the kind of boy a girl would kill herself over." The last few exchanges were made via AOL Instant Messenger instead of MySpace. When she ran upstairs, Meier ran into her father. She told him about the trouble and went to her room. Ron went downstairs to the kitchen where he and Tina talked about the cyberbullying and made dinner. Twenty minutes later, Tina suddenly froze in mid-sentence and ran up to Meier's room, but Meier had already hanged herself with a belt in her bedroom closet. Despite attempts to revive her, Meier was pronounced dead the next day on October 17, aged 13.

== Investigation ==
=== Local ===
Several weeks after her death, Megan Meier's parents were told that the mother of one of their daughter's friends—with whom Meier had had a falling out—had created the "Josh Evans" account. The parent, Lori Drew, who created the fake account, admitted that she and her daughter had the password to the account, and characterized the hoax to a reporter as a "joke". Initially, Drew denied knowing about the offensive messages that were sent to Meier. She told the police that the account was aimed at "gaining Megan's confidence and finding out what Megan felt about her daughter and other people". The neighborhood mother who had told the Meiers that Drew had the hoax account said, "Lori laughed about it", and said she had intended to "mess with Megan".

While Drew's name was excluded from most early news stories, CNN disclosed her name through the inclusion of the police report in its broadcast of the story; it was featured on many blogs.

It was more than a year between Meier's suicide and the first media report of the Internet hoax. The FBI was investigating the matter and had asked the Meier family to refrain from speaking publicly about it to keep the Drews from learning about their investigation. Shortly after the first anniversary of Meier's death, her aunt, Vicki Dunn, saw an article written by Steve Pokin of the Suburban Journals about Internet harassment. She contacted Pokin to share Meier's story with him. Once the story broke, it quickly spread to national and international news outlets.

At a press conference on December 3, 2007, Jack Banas, the prosecuting attorney of St. Charles County, said that Lori Drew's 18-year-old temporary employee, Ashley Grills, wrote most of the messages addressed to Meier and that she wrote the final "Josh Evans" message addressed to Meier. Grills said she wrote the final message to end the MySpace hoax and get Meier to stop communicating with "Josh Evans". Banas stated that he did not interview Grills because, at the time, she was under psychiatric treatment for her participation in the Meier case. He did not plan to interview her at a later date.

The Meiers criticized the prosecutor's statements, saying that Banas did not interview any party other than the Drews and that Banas was solely relying on the testimony of the Drews. Banas said that the original FBI investigation into the matter, during which Grills was interviewed, established her role in the event. The Meiers have said they do not hold Grills responsible for Megan's death. Banas said Sarah Drew, by then 15, was attending a different school and not living in Dardenne Prairie. He said Lori Drew was fearful of telling him where her daughter lives. According to Lori Drew's attorney, she had to close her advertising business in the wake of publicity about her role in the Internet account and messages. Neighbors shunned the Drews following the revelations.

Internet webloggers posted photographs, telephone numbers, e-mail details, and addresses of the Drews and the employee on various websites. Businesses that advertised in Drew's coupon book business were additionally shunned. Sarah Wells, a weblogger who revealed the given and family names of Lori Drew, said, "I don't regret naming Drew." After reviewing the case, county prosecutors decided not to file any criminal charges in relation to the hoax.

=== Federal ===
Lori Drew was indicted and convicted by a jury of violations of the Computer Fraud and Abuse Act in 2008 over the matter. Her conviction was vacated by a federal judge on a post-trial verdict, on the grounds that the Computer Fraud and Abuse Act did not intend to criminalize the conduct of which Drew was accused. The government chose not to appeal this post-trial ruling.

== Reactions ==
When Megan Meier's story was first reported in the St. Charles Journal, readers were concerned about the unnamed adults implicated in the hoax. Later, the focus was on the decision by the St. Louis Suburban Journals not to print the names of the Drews. In an interview, the reporter said that names had been withheld to protect the minor child in the family. Webloggers learned and reported the names of Lori and Gary Drew, after they found the latter in minutes. Media eventually revealed Lori Drew's name and published her photograph.

Banas said that he was aware of the national outrage against the Drews, which originated on the Internet in response to the Steve Pokin article in the O'Fallon Journal. The Drews have had their home and work addresses, phone and cell phone numbers, and aerial photos of their home posted on the Internet. The Drews' property had additionally been vandalized. Banas said some of these actions against the Drews could constitute Internet stalking.

"Because we can't prosecute somebody it certainly does not justify violating the law," Banas said. "We live in this country by the rule of the law." He described Lori Drew as "upset, cautious and guarded" when he interviewed her. Banas said that she felt "terrible" about Meier's death. A vigil was held for Meier on November 24, 2007. The crowd gathered in a nearby parking lot and walked past the homes of the Meiers and the Drews. A small piece of ground adjacent to the Drews' house was the scene of remembrances by friends of the Meiers.

The case has caused several jurisdictions to enact or to consider legislation prohibiting harassment over the Internet. The Board of Aldermen for the City of Dardenne Prairie passed an ordinance on November 22, 2007, in response to the incident. The ordinance prohibits any harassment that utilizes an electronic medium, including the Internet, text messaging services, pagers, and similar devices. Violations of the ordinance are treated as misdemeanors, with fines of up to $500 and up to 90 days imprisonment. The city of Florissant, Missouri, additionally passed a "Cyber Harassment" law, with other municipalities, counties, and states considering following suit. The state of Missouri is to revise its harassment laws in response to the case, updating them to cover harassment through computers and mobile phone messaging, and creating a new crime to cover adults 21 and over harassing minors under the age of 18.

The new legislation went into effect on August 28, 2008, and was intended to cover loopholes in the current law. According to the St. Louis Daily Record, the new language "expands the definition of the crime of 'harassment' to include knowingly intimidating or causing emotional distress anonymously, either by phone or electronically, or causing distress to a child." It additionally "increases the penalty for harassment from a misdemeanor to a felony, carrying up to four years in prison, if it's committed by an adult against someone 17 or younger, or if the criminal has previously been convicted of harassment." This is one of the first comprehensive cyberbullying and cyberstalking state laws that protect children and adults from harassment on social networking sites. The bill is a reaction to Lori Drew's case dismissal and Governor Matt Blunt, the politician who signed the law into effect states, "[Missouri] needs tough laws to protect its children." A bill was introduced in the 111th Congress on April 2, 2009, as H.R. 1966. Both houses of the Missouri State Legislature voted unanimously on May 15, 2008, to criminalize usage of the Internet to harass someone, the existing statute was expanded to prohibit abusive "communication by any means" and is known as "Megan's Law." (not to be confused with New Jersey's and subsequent federal Megan's Law). On May 22, 2008, Congresswoman Linda T. Sanchez introduced H.R. 6123 as the "Megan Meier Cyberbullying Prevention Act" to "amend title 18, United States Code, with respect to cyberbullying."

Tina Meier started the Megan Meier Foundation, headquartered in Chesterfield, Missouri. The organization states that it exists to promote "awareness, education and promote positive change to children, parents, and educators in response to the ongoing bullying and cyberbullying in our children's daily environment."

== See also ==
- Bullying and suicide
- Catfishing
- Cyberbully, a film loosely based on Meier's case
- Cyberstalking legislation
- Jessi Slaughter sexual abuse and cyberbullying case
- Death of Conrad Roy
- Megan Meier Foundation
- Social media and suicide
- Suicide of Ryan Halligan
- Suicide of Amanda Todd
- Suicide of Near
- Suicide of Tyler Clementi
