= Suicide of Tyler Clementi =

2010 death of a US college student

- Clementi's Facebook profile picture
- Date: September 22, 2010; 16 years ago
- Location: Manhattan, New York City, U.S.
- Type: Teenage suicide, suicide by jumping, drowning
- Motive: Homophobia (Ravi)
- Deaths: Tyler Clementi, aged 18
- Accused: Dharun Ravi; Molly Wei
- Convicted: Dharun Ravi
- Charges: Ravi: Invasion of privacy (2 counts); Attempted invasion of privacy (2 counts); Bias intimidation (hate crime) (4 counts); Tampering with physical evidence (3 counts); Witness tampering; Hindering apprehension or prosecution (3 counts); Wei: Invasion of privacy (2 counts; dropped in exchange for community service and testimony against Ravi)
- Trial: New Jersey v. Dharun Ravi
- Verdict: Ravi: Guilty on all counts (2012; overturned in 2016); Pleaded guilty to one count of attempted invasion of privacy (2016)
- Sentence: Ravi: 30 days in jail (paroled after 20 days), plus 3 years probation and 300 hours of community service Wei: 300 hours of community service

Tyler Clementi (December 19, 1991 – September 22, 2010) was an American student at Rutgers University–New Brunswick who jumped to his death from the George Washington Bridge over the Hudson River on September 22, 2010, at the age of 18. Three days prior, without Clementi's knowledge, his roommate, Dharun Ravi, used a webcam on his dorm room computer and his hallmate Molly Wei's computer to view Clementi kissing another man.

Clementi found out after Ravi posted about the webcam incident on Twitter. Two days later, Ravi urged friends and Twitter followers to watch a second encounter between Clementi and his companion, though the viewing never occurred.

Ravi and Wei were both indicted for their roles in the webcam incidents, though they were not charged with a role in the suicide itself. On May 6, 2011, Wei entered a plea agreement granting her immunity and allowing her to avoid prosecution. Ravi went to trial in early 2012, and was convicted on May 21, 2012, on all charges related to the webcam viewing, with the jury additionally finding that Clementi reasonably believed that Ravi had targeted him for his sexual orientation, thus making Ravi guilty of committing hate crimes against Clementi. After an appeals court overturned parts of the conviction, Ravi pleaded guilty to one count of attempted invasion of privacy on October 27, 2016.

Clementi's death brought national attention to the issue of cyberbullying and the struggles facing LGBTQ youth.

== Background ==
Tyler Clementi was born on December 19, 1991, in Ridgewood, New Jersey. A graduate of Ridgewood High School, Clementi was a violinist; he played with the Ridgewood Symphony Orchestra and participated in the Bergen Youth Orchestra as concertmaster.

A few days before leaving home to attend college at Rutgers, Clementi told his parents that he was gay. While his father supported him, Clementi said in an instant message to a friend that his mother had "basically completely rejected" him. In later interviews, Clementi's mother explained that she had been "sad" and "quiet" as she processed the information and that she "felt a little betrayed" that he had not previously confided in her that he was gay.

She later noted that she had not been ready as a parent to publicly acknowledge having a gay son, partly because her evangelical church had taught that homosexuality was a sin. After their conversation, she said that she and Tyler cried, hugged, and said they loved each other. Jane Clementi said that she and Tyler spent the rest of the week together and spoke frequently on the phone when he was at Rutgers. According to his mother, Tyler seemed "confident" and "comfortable" after coming out and told her of having visited New York City with new friends.

Ravi and Wei met while students at West Windsor-Plainsboro High School North. Prior to arriving at Rutgers, Ravi tried to find information about his new roommate online. On Twitter, Ravi referred to having seen Clementi's communications on JustUsBoys, a pornographic website and message board for gay men, and tweeted "Found out my roommate is gay". Clementi also researched his roommate and read postings on Ravi's Twitter page.

After Ravi and Clementi moved in together, they rarely interacted or spoke. Ravi's text messages to friends described Clementi as shy and awkward. Clementi's online conversations and text messages referred to his amusement at Ravi's construction of a private changing area, but Clementi said he appreciated the fact that Ravi left him alone and did not force an excessively social atmosphere.

== Webcam incidents ==
=== First viewings ===
On September 19 and 21, Clementi asked Ravi for use of their room for those evenings. On the first occasion, Ravi met Clementi's male companion, and Clementi said that the two wanted to be alone for the evening. Ravi has stated that he was worried about theft and that he left the computer in a state where he could view the webcam stream due to those concerns. Other witnesses testified that Ravi said he also wanted to confirm that Clementi was gay.

Ravi and Wei viewed the video stream via iChat for a few seconds, seeing Clementi and his guest kissing. Later, Wei turned on the camera for another view with four others in the room, though Ravi was not there. During this second viewing, Wei and others saw Clementi and his guest kissing, partially naked.

On September 20, Clementi, who followed Ravi's Twitter account, read a message that Ravi sent a few minutes after the webcam viewing the previous day. Ravi wrote: "Roommate asked for the room till midnight. I went into molly's room and turned on my webcam. I saw him making out with a dude. Yay." According to a Rutgers employee, at about 4 a.m. on September 21, Clementi sent an online request for a single room because his "roommate used webcam to spy on me."

=== Second attempt ===
On September 21, Ravi posted text messages saying that there would be a viewing party to watch Clementi and his guest, along with directions on how to view it remotely. At 6:39 p.m., Ravi tweeted, "Anyone with iChat, I dare you to video chat me between the hours of 9:30 and 12. Yes, it's happening again." Ravi had set up the webcam and pointed it towards Clementi's bed. When Clementi returned to his room, he noticed the camera and texted a friend saying he had unplugged Ravi's powerstrip to prevent further video streaming during his date. Ravi has said that he had changed his mind regarding the broadcast and disabled the camera himself by putting the computer in sleep mode.

The same day, Clementi complained to a resident assistant and two other officials that Ravi had used a webcam to stream part of Clementi's private sexual encounter with another man. The resident assistant testified at trial that Clementi appeared shaky and uncomfortable when they met around 11 p.m., and in his official report of the meeting, the resident assistant said that Clementi requested both a room change and punishment for Ravi. In a formal email request to the resident assistant made after the meeting, Clementi described the two viewing incidents, quoted from Ravi's Twitter postings, and wrote "I feel that my privacy has been violated and I am extremely uncomfortable sharing a room with someone who would act in this wildly inappropriate manner."

Clementi wrote in detail on the JustUsBoys and Yahoo! message boards about complaints he filed through university channels about his roommate. His posts indicated that he did not want to share a room with Ravi after he learned about the first incident and then discovered that Ravi invited his Twitter followers to watch a second sexual encounter. "He [the resident assistant] seemed to take it seriously," Clementi wrote in a post about 15 hours before his jump from the George Washington Bridge.

Within a few hours, Clementi returned to his dorm room and he and Ravi were there for less than an hour.

== Suicide ==
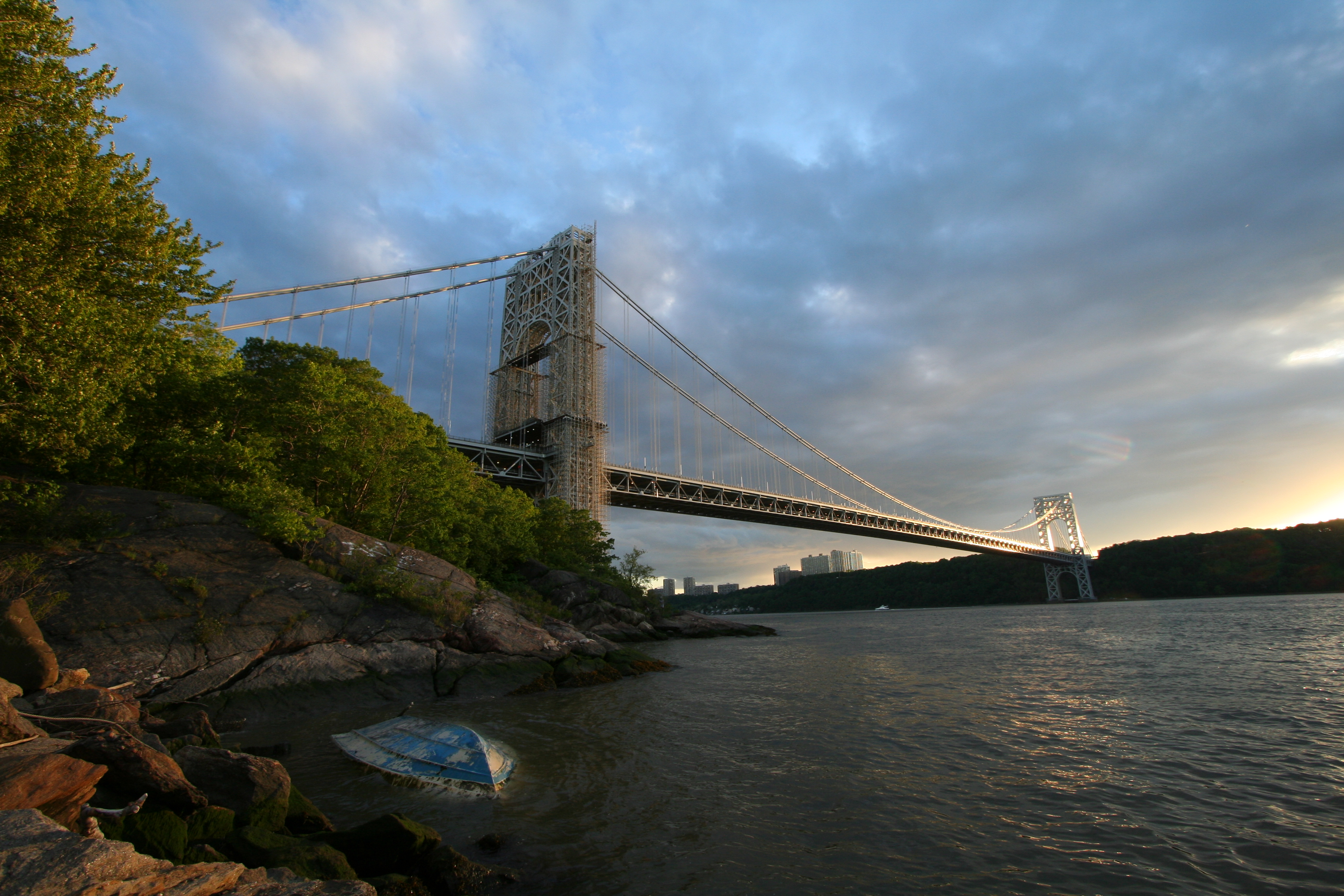
Clementi jumped from the George Washington Bridge and was found dead in the Hudson River.

On the evening of September 22, Clementi left the dorm room, bought food from the campus food court, and, around 6:30 p.m., headed toward the George Washington Bridge. By 8:42 p.m., he had posted from his cell phone on Facebook: "Jumping off the gw bridge sorry".

Clementi left a suicide note which, along with documents on his computer, was never released to either the public or to the defense team in Ravi's trial, because Clementi's suicide was not directly related to the charges against Ravi.

Clementi's wallet, car, cell phone, and computer were found on or near the bridge. His body was found on September 29, in the Hudson River just north of the bridge. The medical examiner gave drowning as the cause of death, noting blunt impact injuries to the torso as well.

== Reaction ==
Shortly after Clementi's suicide, the Gay, Lesbian and Straight Education Network stated, "There has been heightened media attention surrounding the suicides in New Jersey, Texas, California, Indiana, and Minnesota." The same month Clementi died, four other Americans were reported to have died by suicide after being taunted about their homosexuality.

=== At Rutgers University ===
Rutgers University students planned a "Black Friday" event to commemorate and memorialize Clementi. Rutgers president Richard Levis McCormick stated, "We grieve for him and for his family, friends and classmates as they deal with the tragic loss of a gifted young man...."

Beginning in the 2011–2012 school year, a Rutgers University pilot program was instituted to permit students to choose their dorm roommates, regardless of gender. Members of the university's LGBTQ community told the administration that gender-neutral housing would help create a more inclusive environment for students.

By September 2012, Rutgers had implemented numerous new programs to provide a more supportive environment for LGBTQ students, in reaction to the suicide, including new dormitory options and a new Center for Social Justice Education and LGBT Communities, and students reported a much-improved campus atmosphere.

=== Charitable response ===
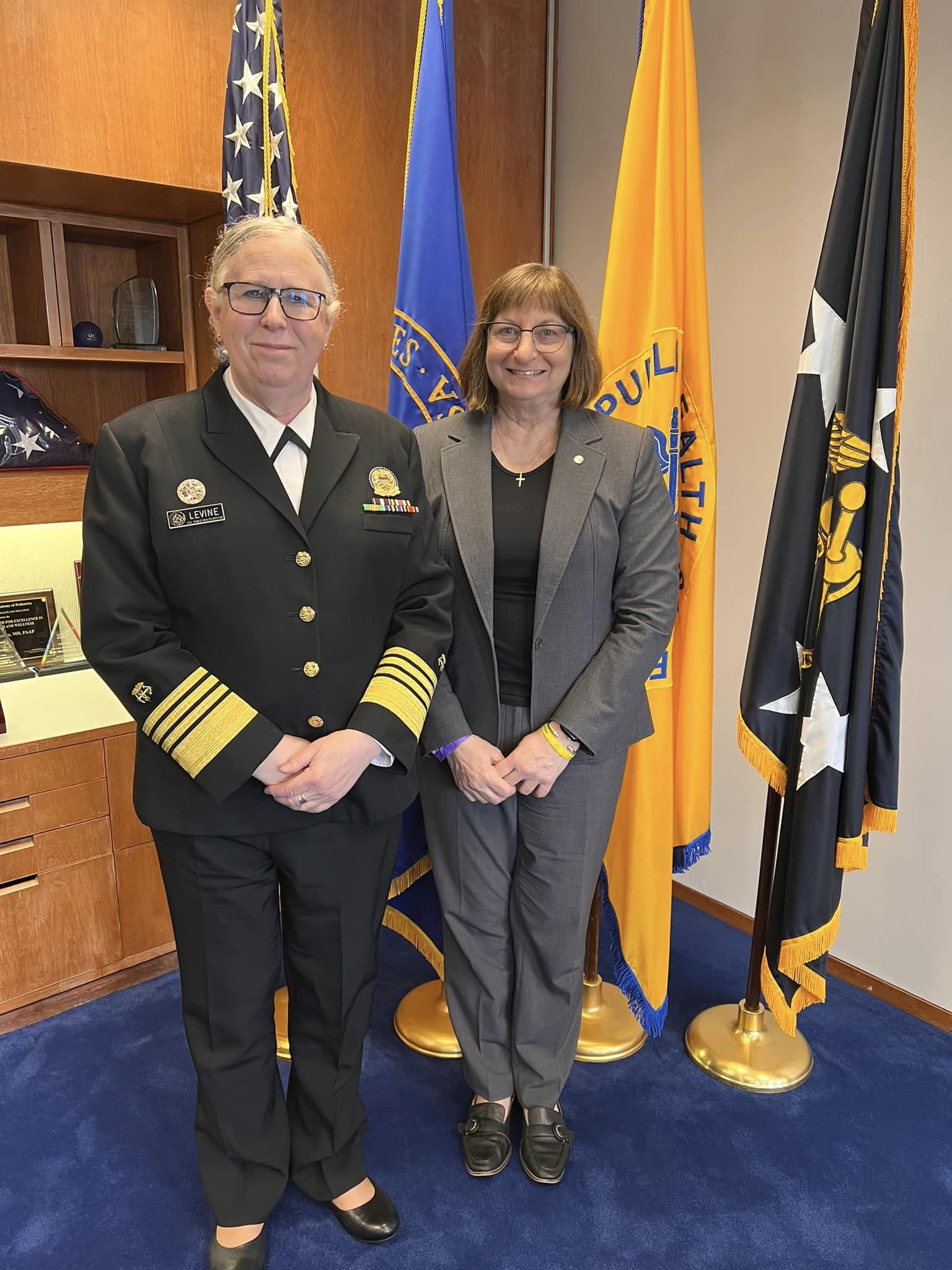
Rachel Levine and Jane Clementi (Tyler's mother and CEO of the Tyler Clementi Foundation) in 2024.

In 2011, Tyler Clementi's parents, Jane and Joseph Clementi, established the Tyler Clementi Foundation, which focuses on promoting acceptance of LGBTQ teens and others marginalized by society; providing education against all forms of bullying, including cyber bullying; and promoting research and development into the causes and prevention of teenage suicide.

On March 9, 2011, the Point Foundation, the nation's largest scholarship-granting organization for LGBTQ students of merit, announced that it had created the Tyler Clementi Point Scholarship to honor Clementi's memory. Clementi's parents said they hoped the scholarship would "raise awareness of young people who are subject to abuse through malicious bullying."

In 2015, the Tyler Clementi Foundation launched #Day1, an anti-bullying campaign that aims to stop bullying before it begins, with support from Caitlyn Jenner, Sarah Jessica Parker, Matthew Broderick, Neil Patrick Harris, and others. In August 2023, Brian Sims joined the foundation's Board of Trustees.

=== Government ===
Tyler Clementi's suicide, along with the suicides of several other gay teens who had been harassed, moved President Barack Obama, Secretary of State Hillary Clinton and Secretary of Education Arne Duncan to express shock and sadness and speak out against any form of bullying. US Senator Frank Lautenberg and Representative Rush Holt of New Jersey introduced federal legislation titled the "Tyler Clementi Higher Education Anti-Harassment Act", to require schools that wish to receive federal funding to establish anti-bullying procedures and codes of conduct.

New Jersey Governor Chris Christie stated that the suicide was an "unspeakable tragedy", that he did not know how Ravi and Wei would sleep at night, and added "as the father of a 17-year-old, I can't imagine what those parents are feeling today – I can't." In response to Clementi's suicide and other, similar incidents, New Jersey General Assembly representatives Valerie Vainieri Huttle and Mary Pat Angelini introduced a bipartisan "Anti-bullying Bill of Rights" in November 2010, which passed on a 71–1 vote in the New Jersey Assembly and a 30–0 vote in the New Jersey Senate.

The San Diego Unified School District Board of Education unanimously approved a resolution to provide a safe environment and equal opportunities for lesbian, gay, bisexual, transgender, and questioning students.

=== Parents' statements ===
The day of the announcement of the verdict in the Dharun Ravi trial, Clementi's father, Joseph, released a statement, directed particularly at young people:

You're going to meet a lot of people in your lifetime. Some of these people you may not like. Just because you don't like them doesn't mean you have to work against them. When you see somebody doing something wrong, tell them: "That's not right. Stop it." The change you want to see in the world begins with you.

In the same statement, Jane Clementi, Tyler's mother, noted the role that electronic media can have in singling out LGBTQ youth for being different. She said:

In this digital world, we need to teach our youngsters that their actions have consequences, that their words have real power to hurt or to help. They must be encouraged to choose to build people up and not tear them down.

=== Advocacy ===
In the weeks following Clementi's suicide, schools around the area of his residence held vigils in memory of his death. Students at Hofstra University gathered for a candlelight vigil and a similar vigil at Harvard College drew over sixty college deans, faculty members, and resident tutors. Students and staff at Pascack Hills High School in Bergen County, near Ridgewood where Clementi lived, wore all black to mourn his death.

The incident brought wider nationwide attention to bullying of LGBTQ youth. "Spirit Day", first observed on October 20, 2010, was established in which people wear the color purple to show support for bullying victims among LGBTQ youth. Clementi's suicide inspired the establishment of Spirit Day, and the day received widespread support from GLAAD, Hollywood celebrities and over 1.6 million Facebook users.

The Human Rights Campaign, a gay-rights advocacy organization, released a plan aimed at increasing awareness of gay-related suicide and harassment around the U.S. According to gay activist William Dobbs, around 10,000 people expressed support on social networking websites for lodging more serious criminal charges, such as manslaughter, against Ravi and Wei, a position that Dobbs himself criticized as a rush to judgment before an investigation had taken place.

However, journalist Jason St. Amand has noted that "there are surprisingly several gay activists who are skeptical about the case and believe that Ravi is being used as a scapegoat and should receive a lesser sentence." William Dobbs has criticized the use of hate crime charges and what he considers to have been a hurried scapegoating of Ravi and Wei. Journalist J. Bryan Lowder has similarly criticized hate-crime laws, arguing that Ravi's motives are difficult to know, and that Ravi should not be blamed for attitudes that are "pervasive in our culture".

Dan Savage, co-founder of the It Gets Better Project, wrote that, although he considered Ravi's actions to have been "the last straw" that triggered Clementi's suicide, Clementi's guest did not die by suicide, and therefore there must have been additional factors, preceding the webcam incidents, contributing to the suicide. Savage said that he deplored the "mob mentality" that focused on "a couple of stupid teenagers who should've known better but didn't." He argued that attention should also be directed toward the "adults and institutions" in society who "perpetuate anti-gay prejudice", and he concluded that to "pin all the blame" on Ravi and Wei amounts to "a coverup". After Ravi was sentenced, Savage said he had been "express[ing] misgivings about the severity of the sentence that Ravi faced. But a 30 day sentence is far, far too lenient—a slap on the wrist."

Eric Marcus compared his own father's suicide with Clementi's, and said that it would not be possible to know the real reasons for Clementi's suicide. He concluded that "At best, we can say that Ravi's spying and subsequent Twitter messages might have triggered Clementi's suicide, which is different from causing his suicide... We've turned Tyler Clementi into a two-dimensional symbol of anti-gay bullying and Dharun Ravi into a scapegoat. This is a case that screams out for compassion and understanding."

The Tyler Clementi Institute for Internet Safety, a legal institute to assist other victims of cyberbullying, was launched in October 2015.

=== Criticism of media coverage ===
Soon after invasion-of-privacy charges were brought against Ravi and Wei, gay advocacy groups and bloggers were vocal in their support for bringing hate-crime charges against the defendants. After the prosecutors issued a public statement that they were investigating whether bias played a role in the incident, according to Chris Cuomo of ABC News, a "media floodgate of distortion" ensued.

Writing in The New Yorker, Ian Parker has stated that some of the media coverage and the public outcry against Ravi have exaggerated Ravi's role in the incident, writing that after Clementi's suicide "it became widely understood that a closeted student at Rutgers had committed suicide after video of him having sex with a man was secretly shot and posted online. In fact, there was no posting, no observed sex, and no closet."

=== In popular culture ===
Ellen DeGeneres described herself as "devastated" by Clementi's death, stating, "Something must be done. This month alone, there has been a shocking number of news stories about teens who have been teased and bullied and then committed suicide... This needs to be a wake-up call to everyone: teenage bullying and teasing is an epidemic in this country, and the death rate is climbing."

The band Rise Against released a song, "Make It Stop (September's Children)", which mentions the names of Tyler Clementi and four other young people who died by suicide in September 2010 after being bullied based on their sexual orientation.

Madonna gave tribute to Clementi by showing a picture of him and other gay teens who have died by suicide during the "Nobody Knows Me" video interlude in the MDNA Tour. Canadian musician Owen Pallett released a song called "The Secret Seven" on his 2014 album In Conflict that addresses Clementi.

Monica Lewinsky said that Clementi's story inspired her to speak out against cyberbullying, in a TED talk called The Price of Shame.

In a 2011 interview with PinkNews, Don Lemon stated that his memoir, Transparent, was dedicated to Clementi.

Tyler's story inspired a 2016 musical, with music and lyrics by Craig Carnelia, and a book by Joe Tracz. The musical was produced at the Williamstown Theater Center, and starred Taylor Trensch.

== Court case ==
On September 28, 2010, Dharun Ravi and Molly Wei were each charged with two counts of invasion of privacy for the September 19 webcam transmission. Ravi was charged with two additional counts for the September 21 viewing attempt. On April 20, 2011, a Middlesex County grand jury indicted Ravi on 15 counts of invasion of privacy, bias intimidation, tampering with evidence, witness tampering, and hindering apprehension or prosecution.

On May 6, 2011, Wei entered a plea agreement allowing her to avoid prosecution in exchange for her testimony against Ravi, 300 hours of community service, counseling, and classes on interacting with people of alternative lifestyles.

On March 16, 2012, Ravi was convicted on all 15 counts for his role in the webcam spying incidents. On May 21, 2012, Ravi was sentenced to 30 days in jail, 3 years' probation, 300 hours of community service, a $10,000 fine, and counseling on cyberbullying. Both the prosecutors and Ravi filed separate appeals. On June 18, 2012, Ravi was released from jail after 20 days of his sentence. Federal immigration authorities said that Ravi would not be deported to India.

In February 2016, Ravi asked the courts to overturn his convictions following a 2015 New Jersey Supreme Court ruling that struck down as unconstitutionally vague a part of the law under which he was charged.

In September 2016, the convictions were overturned by an appeals court in New Jersey, in a decision supported by prosecutors because of the earlier ruling on constitutionality. A request to maintain the convictions for other crimes, such as invasion of privacy and witness tampering, was denied because of the influence bias allegations.

Ravi accepted a plea deal on October 27, 2016, and pleaded guilty to one count of attempted invasion of privacy, a third-degree felony. He was sentenced to time already served and fines paid, and the remaining charges against him were dropped.

== See also ==
- Social media and suicide
- List of suicides of LGBTQ people
- Suicide of Amanda Todd – 2012 suicide of Canadian student
- Suicide of Megan Meier – Suicide of American cyberbullied teenager
- Death of Conrad Roy – 2014 manslaughter in Fairhaven, Massachusetts, U.S.
