= MSpy =

Computer monitoring software

mSpy
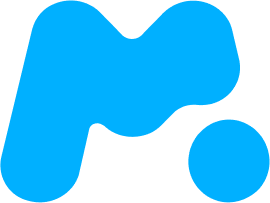
- Developer: Virtuoso Holding
- Operating system: iOS, Android, Windows, macOS
- Available in: Multilingual
- Type: mobile and computer parental control monitoring
- License: Proprietary
- Website: mspy.com

mSpy is a brand of mobile and computer parental control monitoring software for iOS, Android, Windows, and macOS. The app monitors and logs user activity on the client device and sends the data to a personalized dashboard. Data the users can monitor includes text messages, calls, GPS locations, social media chats, and more. It is owned by Virtuoso Holding.

== History ==
mSpy was launched as a product for mobile monitoring by Altercon Group in 2010.

In 2012, the application allowed parents to monitor not only smartphones but also computers running Windows and macOS.

In 2013, mSpy became TopTenReviews cell phone monitoring software award winner.

By 2014, the business grew nearly 400%, and the app's user numbers exceeded 1 million.

In 2015, mSpy received the Parents Tested Parents Approved (PTPA) Winner’s Seal of Approval in the United States. In 2015 and 2018, mSpy was the victim of data breaches which released user data.

In 2016, mLite, a light version of mSpy, became available from Google Play. The same year, it was awarded the kidSAFE Certified Seal in the United States.

In 2017, mSpy collaborated with YouTuber and journalist Coby Persin to conduct a social experiment on the dangers of social media and online predators. A social experiment, conducted with parental consent, involved Coby Persin to befriend three children—aged 12, 13, and 14—via Snapchat and then invite them to meet personally. Each of the participants agreed to the meeting and arrived at the designated location. The video of the experiment received widespread attention and helped to raise awareness about the importance of online security and parental controls.

In early 2021, mSpy released a new feature - Screenrecorder. The feature allows parents to take screenshots of the kid's screen when they are browsing certain apps.

In 2024, mSpy's Zendesk was compromised by an unknown threat actor, revealing their customer list.

As of 2025, mSpy is compatible with Android, iPhone, and iPad devices. It provides access to various types of data stored on the device, including contact information, calendar entries, emails, SMS messages, browser history, photos, videos, and installed applications. Functions also include GPS tracking, geofencing, keyword alerts etc.

== Reception ==
It was noted that since MSpy runs inconspicuously, there is risk of the software being used illegally. mSpy was called "terrifying" by The Next Web and was featured in NPR coverage of spyware used against victims of stalking and other domestic violence. In response mSpy released security updates aimed at reducing the risk of misuse and stated that it "uses encryption protocols to protect user data and that access is restricted to the account holder".

In May 2015, Brian Krebs reported that mSpy was hacked, leaking personal data for hundreds of thousands of users of devices with mSpy installed. mSpy claimed that there was no data leak, but that instead, it was the victim of blackmailers.

In September 2018, Krebs claimed and demonstrated that anyone could easily gain access to the mSpy database containing data for millions of users. The company responded by stating that the exposed data consisted primarily of error logs and incorrect login attempts. Following the incident, mSpy implemented new security measures, changed encryption keys, and reset passwords for affected accounts.

A 2024 Sky News story characterised mSpy as "stalkerware".

Leaked customer support messages from mSpy reveal misuse of its app for illegally monitoring partners and children.

== See also ==
- Parental controls
- Spyware
- Life360
