= Trial by media =

Perception of one's guilt or innocence via coverage

Trial by media is a phrase popular in the late 20th century and early 21st century to describe the impact of television and newspaper coverage on a person's reputation by creating a widespread perception of guilt or innocence before, or after, a verdict in a court of law. It is particularly relevant in cases where high-profile individuals stand trial, with the concern that the impartiality of the jury may be compromised by extraneous information, disrupting due process and resulting in an unfair trial.

== Etymology and early use ==
The concept was popularized for the first time as Trial by Television in response to the 3 February 1967 television broadcast of The Frost Programme, hosted by David Frost. The confrontation and Frost's personal adversarial line of questioning of insurance fraudster Emil Savundra led to concern from ITV executives that it might affect Savundra's right to a fair trial.

== Description ==
During high-publicity court cases, the media are often accused of provoking an atmosphere of public hysteria akin to a lynch mob which not only makes a fair trial nearly impossible but means that regardless of the result of the trial, the accused will not be able to live the rest of their life without intense public scrutiny.

Although popularized in 1967, the idea that popular media can have a strong influence on the legal process goes back certainly to the development of the printing press and probably much further. This is not including the use of a state-controlled press to criminalize political opponents, but in its commonly understood meaning covers all occasions where the reputation of a person has been drastically affected by ostensibly non-political publications.

Often the coverage in the press can be said to reflect the views of the person in the street. However, more credibility is generally given to printed material than 'water cooler gossip'. The responsibility of the press to confirm reports and leaks about individuals being tried has come under increasing scrutiny and journalists are calling for higher standards. There was much debate over U.S President Bill Clinton's impeachment trial and prosecutor Kenneth Starr's investigation and how the media handled the trial by reporting commentary from lawyers which influenced public opinion.

In the United Kingdom, strict contempt of court regulations restrict the media's reporting of legal proceedings after a person is formally arrested. These rules are designed so that a defendant receives a fair trial in front of a jury that has not been tainted by prior media coverage. Newspapers like the Daily Mirror and The Sun have been prosecuted under these regulations, although such prosecutions are rare. It is also within the power of the courts to prevent the jury from accessing electronic devices during the course of the trial. Furthermore, court security officers are authorized to search for electronic devices that they suspect a juror may have failed to surrender as per the judge's request. Consequently, to conduct research into the case using electronic devices, and indeed share this information with other jurors, is punishable by a fine or imprisonment for up to two years.

== Media Influence ==
The legal article "Trial by Media: An Overview" by Nikitha Suresh and Lucy Sara George explores how paid news from political parties and powerful organizations can divert the media from its true purpose, turning it from a public service into a tool of its sponsors. This distortion can lead to media trials, where the press labels someone guilty before the court reaches a verdict. The Supreme Court, in State of Maharashtra v. Rajendra Jawanmal Gandhi, warned that trials influenced by the press, electronic media, or public agitation undermine the rule of law and risk miscarriages of justice. Judges, the Court emphasized, must remain free from such pressure, as every party has a constitutional right to a fair trial before an impartial tribunal. The Sheena Bora murder case is cited as an example in which the media intensely scrutinized the personal life of the accused, Indrani Mukherjee, effectively placing her on trial before the judiciary delivered its judgment. The article notes that similar instances of media driven prejudgment have occurred many times.

The core idea of media trials is that although they are aware of society's existing legal system, they frequently ignore established laws. Rather than accurately presenting the facts of a case, a media trial serves to propagate media opinion. This behavior is frequently motivated by the platforms' desire to make a profit, which leads them to structure and deliver emotional or sentimental news to the public. This type of coverage gives the media enormous influence over the public, which in certain instances has led to protests and riots. Ultimately, media outlets such as newspapers, news media, radio, and television hold significant power because they not only circulate information but also help decide what topics the public will discuss.

The rise of Web 2.0 technology has transformed the digital environment by turning users from consumers into producers who can create, publish, and share content on platforms like Facebook and Twitter. These tools allow people to interact through posts, likes, comments, and tags, and this shift has influenced the administration of justice. Web 2.0 has supported the growth of citizen journalism, where non-professionals take a central role in reporting, editing, and distributing news through blogging, uploading photos or videos, sharing information, and commenting on events. It can also involve reposting or linking to others’ material as a way of joining public discussion.

At the same time, the expansion of the Internet, mobile devices, and social media has created serious challenges for trial openness, especially in criminal cases. As information sharing increased rapidly in the late twentieth century, social networking sites became part of daily life for many people around the world, with platforms such as Facebook, Snapchat, Twitter, and YouTube widely used across multiple devices. The influence of these networks is significant, with global user numbers projected to reach nearly 3 billion people.

‘Trial by media’: Policing, the 24-7 news mediasphere and the ‘politics of outrage’ academic article examines the “trial by media” surrounding Sir Ian Blair leading up to his resignation as London’s Metropolitan Police Commissioner in October 2008. It focuses on the media’s reaction to Blair’s 2005 claim that news organizations displayed “institutional racism” in their reporting of murders and gave disproportionate coverage to the 2001 Soham case involving Holly Wells and Jessica Chapman. These statements angered an already hostile press, which responded collectively and helped establish a dominant narrative portraying Blair as “gaffe-prone,” weakening his credibility and marking a turning point in his leadership. While the authors do not argue that the media alone forced Blair from office, they contend that the combined pressures of media politics, party politics, and police politics ultimately made his position untenable.

== See also ==
- Amanda Knox
- Brett Kavanaugh
- Casey Anthony
- Calciopoli
- Court of public opinion
- Courtroom photography and broadcasting
- Day-care sex-abuse hysteria
- Death of Azaria Chamberlain
- Duke lacrosse case
- Extraordinary Popular Delusions and the Madness of Crowds
- Fishing expedition
- Jasleen Kaur harassment controversy
- Karl Muck
- McMartin preschool trial
- Media circus
- Nancy Grace
- Presumption of guilt
- A Rape on Campus
- Richard Jewell
- Richard Ricci
- Sam Sheppard
- Sensationalism
- Trial by ordeal
- Witch-hunt
