= Megan Meier Foundation =

American youth support organization

The Megan Meier Foundation is a 501(c)(3) non-profit organization founded in 2007 by Tina Meier, whose daughter, Megan Meier, died by suicide in 2006 at the age of 13. It supports individuals, especially children, who are victims of cyberbullying and suicide.

== Background ==
A year before the foundation was established, Megan died by suicide due to cyberbullying on MySpace on October 16, 2006, at Dardenne Prairie, Missouri. Therefore, it sparked debates on online safety and suicide prevention.

== Megan Meier Foundation ==
Tina Meier, as a real estate agent, dedicated herself to the foundation with a group of friends and relatives to protect other children who have similar issues in cyberbullying and are at risk of suicide. In addition to Meier's dedication of protecting children who are victims of cyberbullying and suicide, the foundation suggests that there are 20 percent of teens who sent nudes/semi-nudes of themselves, 48 percent received sexually suggestive messages, and 21 percent of girls and 39 percent of boys have sent "suggestive content to those they want to date." In honor of Megan, the foundation had developed for a year and a half, and it provides free mental health services from elementary school to ages 19.

== See also ==
- United States v. Drew
