= Cyberstalking legislation =

Legal overview of the situation by country

Cyberstalking is a relatively recent phenomenon; many nations and territories have proposed legislation to address the practice because traditional laws against harassment or assault are not applicable to online behavior. Cyberstalking is a form of harassment using electronic means. Newsworthy incidents caused by cyberstalking have inspired calls for legislators to pass statutes to penalize the perpetrators, though most such proposed laws are often impeded by free speech challenges and other concerns about governmental overreach.

== Legislation by country ==
=== Australia ===
Some of the Australia's existing criminal statutes provide penalties for harassment and threats via telecommunications services. The Family Law Act 1975 protects individuals from harassment, including harassment that occurs via electronic communications. However, this is limited to the victims of family violence. State laws can deal with some forms of cyberbullying, such as documents containing threats, and threats to destroy and damage property. Commonwealth offences that criminalise the misuse of telecommunication services are also relevant when technology is used to communicate harassment or threats.

=== India ===
In 2013, The Indian Parliament made amendments to the Indian Penal Code, introducing cyberstalking as a criminal offence. Stalking has been defined as a man or woman who follows or contacts a man or woman, despite clear indication of disinterest to such contact by the man or woman, or monitoring of use of internet or electronic communication of a man or a woman. A man or a woman committing the offence of stalking would be liable for imprisonment up to three years for the first offence, and shall also be liable to fine and for any subsequent conviction would be liable for imprisonment up to five years and with fine.

=== Poland ===
Cyberstalking has been illegal in Poland since 2011.

=== United States ===
American law makes little distinction between cyberbullying and cyberstalking; the latter is typically used when the victim is an adult but there are few differences in legal remedies for children vs. adults. True threats are not protected in American law, but courts have been inconsistent on whether that term applies to online harassment in which no specific threat has been made against the victim's safety. There have been few attempts at federal cyberbullying legislation in the United States, because most criminal law is handled internally by states. The federal government can only enforce such penalties against institutions that receive federal funding.

Despite many calls to fully illegalize cyberstalking among American citizens and legislators, proposed statutes are often restricted by the First Amendment as unacceptable government overreach into personal expression, even if that expression is abusive. Organizations such as the American Civil Liberties Union have taken the view that the First Amendment protects all speech, even speech that is reprehensible. In general, such organizations argue that while the need for legislation may exist, legislators must take a cautious, reasoned approach to enacting laws, and not rush into creating laws that would curtail speech too much.

==== State legislation ====
California passed the first cyberstalking law in 1999, with the addition of criminal penalties to the California Penal Code. Its first use resulted in a six-year sentence for a man who harassed a woman who could identify him. After sending hundreds of threatening e-mails to an actress, another male convicted after spending months in jail waiting for trial was sentenced in 2001 to five years probation, forbidden access to computers, and forced to attend mental health counseling. In 2011, a man was ordered to undergo psychiatric evaluation before sentencing for cyberstalking. In addition, the California Civil Code outlines grounds for an individual suing their cyberstalker and any accomplices for general damages, special damages, and punitive damages for cyberstalking.

Texas enacted the Stalking by Electronic Communications Act in 2001. In 2004, Washington state passed a statute enabling penalties against a person that uses electronic communications with the "intent to harass, intimidate, torment, or embarrass any other person" if they use lewd or obscene language, use language implying physical threats, or repeatedly harass a person; such is treated as a gross misdemeanor. In 2008, Missouri revised its statutes on harassment to include harassment and stalking through electronic and telephonic communications and cyber-bullying after the suicide of Megan Meier.

Florida passed a stature that defines cyberstalking as a first degree misdemeanor. Cyberstalking a child under the age of 16 or a person of any age for which the offender has been ordered by the courts not to contact is considered "aggravated stalking," a third degree felony under Florida law. Cyberstalking in conjunction with a credible threat is also considered aggravated stalking. Illinois has also added penalties for "Harassment through electronic communications" to its criminal code.

In 2021, legislators in Washington state introduced two bills at the aim of addressing cyberharassment, the first of which was mainly aimed at preventing doxing, while the second was written with the Anti-Defamation League to update the existing law to uphold the First Amendment.

== See also ==
- Cyberstalking
- Stalker (Stalking)
- Suicide of Megan Meier
