= List of suicides attributed to bullying =

The following is a list of suicides attributed to bullying — both in-person and via the Internet (aka cyberbullying).

For a list of people who died from suicide, regardless of reason, see List of suicides (A–M and N–Z) and List of suicides in the 21st century.

== Victims ==
- August Ames (1994–2017) (born Mercedes Grabowski), age 23, was a Canadian pornographic actor and model. On December 5, 2017, Ames was found dead after hanging herself. Her death was ruled a suicide by the Ventura County Medical Examiner's Office. Media outlets have insinuated Ames died by suicide following successive comments on Twitter, in which she defended her refusal to perform in a pornographic movie with a man who had previously worked in gay pornography, and sparking an online firestorm. Ames wrote that the decision was out of concern for her health. Some members of the gay community suggested her comments were homophobic and ill-informed about STI testing in the adult industry. Friends said she suffered from depression, and Ames had previously discussed struggles with bipolar disorder and "multiple personality" disorder.
- Jadin Bell (1997–2013), age 15, was an Oregon youth known for his suicide that raised the national profile on youth bullying and gay victimization in bullying. Bell, a gay teenager, was allegedly intensely bullied both in person and on the Internet because he was gay. He was a member of the La Grande High School cheerleading team in La Grande, Oregon, where he was a sophomore. On January 19, 2013, Bell went to a local elementary school and hanged himself from the play structure. He did not immediately die from the strangulation, and was rushed to the emergency room, where he was kept on life support. The Associated Press reported that a spokesman for the Oregon Health and Science University's Portland hospital announced that after being taken off life support, Bell died on February 3, 2013. Bell's death was largely reported in the media, starting discussions about bullying, the effect it has on youth, and gay bullying. The Huffington Post, Salon, Oregon Public Broadcasting, GLAAD, PQ Monthly, PinkNews, and many other media outlets reported on Bell's death. The media reported his suicide stemmed from being bullied for being gay, which Bell's father fully believed, stating, "He was hurting so bad. Just the bullying at school. Yeah there were other issues, but ultimately it was all due to the bullying, for not being accepted for being gay."
- Danny Chen (1992–2011), age 19, was an American U.S. Army soldier from New York City, who had served in the war in Afghanistan. Chen was found dead of a self-inflicted gunshot wound in his living quarters on October 3, 2011, in Kandahar, Afghanistan, after being relentlessly bullied, harassed, tortured, and hazed by his fellow soldiers on the basis of his racial heritage. His death resulted in a military investigation, which led to eight U.S. soldiers being charged for their involvement in Chen's suicide. Four of the eight soldiers involved were court martialed.
- Tyler Clementi (1991–2010), age 18, was a student at Rutgers University in Piscataway, New Jersey, who jumped to his death from the George Washington Bridge on September 22, 2010. On September 19, Dharun Ravi, his roommate, and a fellow hallmate allegedly used a webcam to view, without Clementi's knowledge, Clementi kissing another man. On September 21, the day prior to the suicide, the roommate allegedly urged friends and Twitter followers to watch via his webcam a second tryst between Clementi and his friend. Clementi's death brought national and international attention to the issue of cyberbullying and the struggles facing LGBTQ youth. Tyler's story is featured in the film documentary Bullied to Silence.
- Etika (1990–2019) (born Desmond Daniel Amofah), age 29, was an American YouTuber. On June 19, 2019, Etika died of suicide by jumping off of the Manhattan Bridge and drowning. Amofah had struggled with mental health issues, and had been cyberbullied and harassed prior to his death.
- Dolly Everett (2003–2018), age 14, was an Australian teenager who was the face of Akubra, an Australian hat company, at the age of eight. She died by suicide after being cyberbullied. Dolly's Law was formed in New South Wales, which enables for the criminalization of cyberbullying.
- Kelly Fraser (1993–2019), age 26, was a Canadian Inuk pop singer from Igloolit, Nunavut, most popular for her Inuktitut language covers of pop songs, as well as creating her own original songs. Fraser was found dead in her home in Winnipeg, Manitoba; her death was ruled a suicide, which Fraser's family attributed to "childhood traumas, racism, and persistent cyberbullying."
- Mallory Grossman (2005–2017), age 12, was a student at Copeland Middle School who committed suicide on June 14, 2017 due to school bullying and cyberbullying she received.
- Ryan Halligan (1989–2003), age 13, was an American student from Essex Junction, Vermont, who died by suicide on October 7, 2003, after allegedly being bullied by his classmates in person and online. According to the Associated Press, Halligan was allegedly repeatedly sent homophobic instant messages, and was "threatened, taunted, and insulted incessantly". Halligan's case has been cited by legislators in various states proposing legislation to curb cyber-bullying. In Vermont, laws were subsequently enacted to address the cyberbullying problem and the risk of teen suicides, in response. In 2008, his suicide and its causes were examined in a segment of the PBS Frontline television program entitled "Growing Up Online". His suicide has also been referenced in many other news stories on bullying.
- Goo Hara (1991–2019), age 28, was a South Korean actress, singer and member of Kara. On November 24, 2019, Hara died of suicide. Prior to her death, she was involved in a legal dispute battle with her ex-boyfriend about being sexually assaulted by him, which then led to him threatening to leak a sex tape without her consent to end her career instantly. After news of her sex video went public, Goo was harassed on social media.
- Hana Kimura (1997–2020), age 22, was a Japanese wrestler. On May 23, 2020, she died of suicide by hydrogen sulfide poisoning, after having been cyberbullied.
- Adriana Kuch (2008–2023), age 14, was a student at Central Regional High School in Berkeley Township, New Jersey who died by suicide two days after a video of her being viciously attacked by her bullies was uploaded online. Three girls suspected of attacking Adriana were charged with aggravated felony assault, while a fourth suspect was charged with conspiracy to commit aggravated assault.
- Lance Corporal Harry Lew (1990–2011), age 21, was an American Marine of Chinese descent who was a suicide by gunshot after being the victim of hazing by his fellow Marines. One suspect involved in hazing Lew was sentenced to 30 days in jail and reduction of rank, while the two other suspects received no punishment. Lew was the nephew of Congresswoman Judy Chu (D-CA).
- Tyler Long (1992–2009), age 17, was a student with Asperger syndrome. Ableist students would steal from him, spit in his cafeteria food, and call him names like "gay" and "faggot". When his mother Tina Long went to the school to complain about the bullying, the school responded to them saying that "boys will be boys", or, "he just took it the wrong way." On October 17, 2009, two months into his junior year of high school, Tyler Long changed from his pajamas into his favorite T-shirt and jeans. He strapped a belt around his neck and hanged himself from the top shelf of his bedroom closet. The story of his suicide was later told in the 2011 documentary Bully.
- Megan Meier (1992–2006), age 13, was an American teenager from Dardenne Prairie, Missouri, who died of suicide by hanging on October 17, 2006. A year later, Meier's parents prompted an investigation into the matter, and her suicide was attributed to cyber-bullying through the social networking website Myspace. Allegedly, the mother of Meier's former friend created a fake profile, which was intended to use Meier's messages to get information about her and eventually humiliate her.
- Hamed Nastoh (1985–2000), age 14, was an Afghan-Canadian high school student who committed suicide by jumping off the Pattullo Bridge, in British Columbia. Hamed, a 9th grade student at Enver Creek Secondary School in Surrey, British Columbia, left a 5-page note for his family that detailed the harassment he received from his peers. A student stated that, "Everyone gets bullied. But this went too far. We stood up for him, but people couldn't get the hint that this went too far…" One of Hamed's last penned wishes was, "for people to stop harassing each other and to realize that teasing is hurtful."
- Brodie Panlock (1987–2006), age 19, was an Australian waitress from Melbourne who died after jumping from a multilevel carpark in Hawthorn. Her suicide was attributed to serious workplace bullying at the café where she worked. Her parents successfully lobbied the Victorian Government to amend the Crimes Act 1958 to include serious bullying as a criminal offence, with a maximum penalty of ten years imprisonment.
- Rehtaeh Parsons (1995–2013), age 17, was a former Cole Harbour District High School student who killed herself by hanging on April 4, 2013, at her home in Dartmouth, Nova Scotia, Canada. She had fallen into a coma, and the decision to switch her life support machine off at Queen Elizabeth II Health Sciences Centre was made the same day. Her death has been attributed to online distribution of photos of an alleged gang rape that occurred 17 months prior to her suicide attempt, in November 2011. On a Facebook page set up in tribute to her daughter, Parsons' mother blamed the four boys who allegedly raped and released images of her, the subsequent constant "bullying and messaging and harassment", and the failure of the Canadian justice system, for her daughter's decision to commit suicide.
- Audrie Pott (1997–2012), age 15, was a student attending Saratoga High School, California. She died of suicide by hanging on September 12, 2012. She had allegedly been sexually assaulted by three teenage boys at a party eight days earlier, and pictures of the assault were posted online with accompanying bullying. Pott's suicide and the circumstances surrounding her death have been compared to the suicide of Rehtaeh Parsons, a young woman in Canada, appearing to show highly similar characteristics. Her life was told in a Netflix documentary Audrie & Daisy.
- Phoebe Prince (1994–2010), age 15, was an Irish student at an American high school who died by hanging herself on January 14, 2010, just 5 months after moving from Ireland to the United States due to school bullying and cyberbullying. Her death led to the criminal prosecution of six teenagers for charges including civil rights violations, as well as to the enactment of stricter anti-bullying legislation by the Massachusetts General Court. Prince had moved from Ireland to South Hadley, in the U.S. state of Massachusetts. Her suicide, after suffering months of bullying from school classmates, brought international attention to the problem of bullying in US schools. In March 2010, a state anti-bullying task force was set up as a result of her death. The Massachusetts legislation was signed into law on May 3, 2010. The trial for those accused in the case occurred in 2011. Sentences of probation and community service were handed down after guilty pleas on May 5, 2011.
- Mikayla Raines (1995–2025), age 30, was the founder and owner of the nonprofit animal rescue organization SaveAFox Rescue and YouTube channel of the same name, which aimed to rescue foxes from unethical treatment and abuse. On June 23, 2025, her husband Ethan Frankamp posted a video on her channel announcing her death by suicide motivated by an alleged online bullying campaign.
- Nicola Ann Raphael (1985–2001), age 15, was a Lenzie Academy high school student from Glasgow, Scotland, who died by suicide via an overdose of co-proxamol on June 24, 2001, due to bullying. She was bullied by her peers for dressing in a "goth" style.
- Jamey Rodemeyer (1997–2011), age 14, was a bisexual teenager from Buffalo, New York, known for his activism against homophobia, and his videos on YouTube to help victims of homophobic bullying. He ended his life by hanging himself on September 18, 2011, in Amherst, allegedly as a result of constant bullying.
- Rebecca Ann Sedwick (2000–2013), age 12, was an American middle school student who died of suicide by jumping from a concrete silo tower on September 9, 2013, due to bullying. Sedwick was a seventh grader at Crystal Lake Middle School in Lakeland, Florida. Sedwick was cyberbullied and bullied in person for one and a half years. Two girls, ages 14 and 12, encouraged others to fight Sedwick, and sent her electronic messages encouraging her to commit suicide. In November 2012, her mother Tricia said that, "she came home near tears every day".
- Manav Singh (2002–2020), aged 17, was an Indian student who was subjected to bullying, trolling, and threatening online after being accused of sexually harassing a girl despite there being no evidence. On the 4th of May, 2020, he jumped off the eleventh floor of his apartment.
- Ty Smalley (1998–2010), age 11, was bullied due to being small for his age. Bullies would cram him into lockers and shove him into trash cans. They would also call him names like "Shrimp" and "Tiny Ty". On May 13, 2010, Ty was cornered in the school gymnasium, and a bully started a fight by pushing him. Normally, Ty would just walk away when a situation like this occurred, but on this occasion, he stood up for himself and pushed back. He and the bully were both sent to the school office. Ty served a three-day suspension, but the bully only served one day of his victim's suspension. After school that day, Ty died of suicide by shooting himself in the head with his father's .22 caliber pistol. His story was also told in the 2011 documentary Bully.
- Lia Smith (2004–2025), age 21, was a student and former collegiate diver at Middlebury College in Vermont. A transgender woman, she was deadnamed and was victim to a smear campaign by the anti-trans website "HeCheated", which shames transgender athletes competing in women's sports. She died by suicide in Cornwall, Vermont on October 18, 2025.
- Sulli (1994–2019) (born Choi Jin-ri), age 25, was a South Korean actress, singer, model and ex-member of f(x). On October 13 or 14, 2019, Sulli died of suicide by hanging, due to depression caused by cyberbullying.
- Gabriel Taye (2008–2017), age 8 was an Ohio elementary school student who died from suicide following an assault in the school bathroom.
- Amanda Todd (1996–2012), age 15, was a Canadian high school student who died from suicide due to school bullying and cyberbullying. She hanged herself at her home in Port Coquitlam, British Columbia, Canada. Prior to her death, Todd had posted a video on YouTube in which she used a series of flash cards to tell her experience of being blackmailed into exposing her breasts via webcam; bullied; and physically assaulted. The video went viral after her death, resulting in international media attention. The video has more than 15 million views as of 2024. The Royal Canadian Mounted Police and British Columbia Coroners Service launched investigations into the suicide. At the time of her death, Todd was a tenth grade student at CABE Secondary in Coquitlam, a school that caters to students who have experienced social and behavior issues in previous educational settings. In response to the death, Christy Clark, the premier of British Columbia, made an online statement of condolence and suggested a national discussion on criminalizing cyberbullying. Also, a motion was introduced in the Canadian House of Commons to propose a study of the scope of bullying in Canada, and for more funding and support for anti-bullying organizations. Todd's mother Carol established the Amanda Todd Trust, receiving donations to support anti-bullying awareness education and programs for young people with mental health problems.
- Tyrone Unsworth (2003–2016), age 13, was an eighth grade student in Brisbane, Australia, who died by suicide on November 22, 2016, after years of bullying motivated by his homosexuality. His grandfather had planned that he would be at school on this day, but he remained at his grandfather's farm. His grandfather returned to the farm from work at about 1 p.m., and when he did not find Unsworth in the house, he "walked out the back" and found him dead.
- Sladjana Vidovic (1992–2008), age 16, was a high school student from Mentor, Ohio, who hanged herself on October 2, 2008, by jumping from a window with a sheet around her neck, which was attributed to constant bullying and harassment. She and her family were from Croatia; due to her accent and her name.
- Jeff Weise (1988–2005), age 16, was an American high school student who committed the Red Lake shootings and then died by suicide on March 21, 2005.
- Kenneth Weishuhn (1997–2012), age 14, was a teen who is known for his suicide that raised the national profile on gay bullying and LGBTQ youth suicides. Weishuhn was allegedly bullied in person, death threats were sent to his mobile phone, and he was the subject of a Facebook hate group. He was targeted for being gay, having come out one month before his suicide. Weishuhn told his mother, Jeannie Chambers, "Mom, you don't know how it feels to be hated". The bullying was characterized as "aggressive", "merciless", and "overwhelming". In response to the bullying, Weishuhn took his own life on April 14, 2012. He hanged himself in the family's garage.
- Dawn-Marie Wesley (1986–2000), age 14, was a Canadian high school student who died from suicide by hanging on November 10, 2000, after allegedly experiencing a cycle of bullying by psychological abuse and verbal threats from three female bullies at her high school. She left behind a note to her family that referred to the bullying to which she had been subjected: "If I try to get help, it will get worse. They are always looking for a new person to beat up and these are the toughest girls. If I ratted, they would get expelled from school and there would be no stopping them. I love you all so much." She died from suicide by hanging herself with her dog's leash in her bedroom.
- Kelly Yeomans (1984–1997), age 13, was an English schoolgirl from the Derby suburb of Allenton. Her suicide by coproxamol overdose on September 28, 1997, became widespread news, after reports indicated she was repeatedly harassed and taunted, particularly about her weight, by a group of her peers. Subsequently, 5 youths, between the ages of 13 and 17, were convicted of intentionally harassing Yeomans in the months leading up to her death.

== See also ==
- Bullying and emotional intelligence
- Bullying and suicide
- Bullying in information technology
- Bullying in medicine
- Bullying in the legal profession
- Bullying in the military
- Bullying in nursing
- Bullying in teaching
- Bullying of students in higher education
- School bullying
- Social media and suicide
- Workplace bullying
- Cyberbullying
