= Merrill College (disambiguation) =

Merrill College is a residential college at the University of California, Santa Cruz.

Merrill College may also refer to:

- Philip Merrill College of Journalism, at the University of Maryland, College Park
- Merrill College (UK), a sixth form college in Derby, UK
