= Auld Aisle Cemetery =

Historic cemetery in Scotland

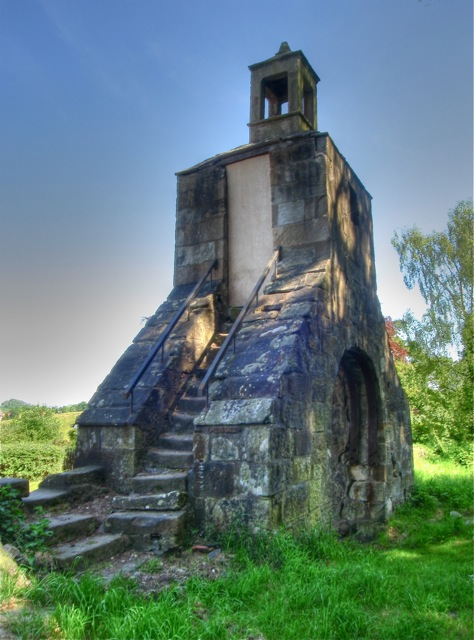
- The watchtower at Auld Aisle Cemetery

- Location of the cemetery in East Dunbartonshire
- 55.9324°N 4.1384°W

Listed Building – Category A
- Designated: 14 May 1971
- Reference no.: LB36646

The Auld Aisle Cemetery is located in Kirkintilloch, East Dunbartonshire, Scotland. The cemetery is protected as a category A listed building, and includes graves dating back to the eighteenth century.

== History ==
The cemetery formed the grounds of St Ninian's Church, a pre-Reformation parish church. St Ninian's was abandoned after 1659, following the division of the old parish of Lenzie into Cumbernauld and Kirkintilloch. The watchtower dates from the early 18th century, and the gate lodge was built when the cemetery was extended in 1863.

== Notable burials ==
- Alexander Bain (1811–1877), first to invent and patent the electric clock
- Beatrice Clugston (1827–1888), social reformer, philanthropist
- Archibald Couper (1831–1892), chemist
- John Ferguson (1836–1906), politician
- David Gray (1838–1861), poet
- Nicola Ann Raphael (1985–2001), bullycide victim

== War graves ==
The cemetery contains the graves of 38 Commonwealth service personnel, 17 from World War I and 21 from World War II.
