= John Smith (BBC executive) =

Chief executive officer of BBC Worldwide from 2004 until 2012

- Born: John Barry Smith; 1957 (age 68–69); Derby, UK
- Education: Shelton Lock School
- Alma mater: Harvard Business School
- Occupations: Chair, Jungle Creations; Chair, Seeker Music; Chair, Spin Group
- Known for: CEO, BBC Worldwide; COO, Burberry; COO and CFO, BBC

John Smith (born August 1957) was the chief executive officer of BBC Worldwide from 2004 until 2012 and was a board member of Burberry Group plc and Chief Operating Officer. He is now Chairman of several businesses and a Director of both listed and private equity owned companies.

Smith attended the Shelton Lock school (which became Merrill College) in Derby. He later went to the Harvard Business School. He completed the management development programme at the BRB Group before joining the BBC where he became CFO then COO. From there he became CEO of BBC Worldwide.

== At the BBC ==
Smith joined the BBC in 1989, becoming the BBC's Finance Director (CFO) in 1996. In April 2000, he became Director of Finance, Property & Business Affairs, adding Property, Procurement and Programme Rights to his portfolio. He oversaw the redevelopment of significant properties for the BBC, including Broadcasting House in Central London and the Media Village in W12. He also chaired the BBC Pension Fund Investment Committee. In June 2004, he became the BBC's Chief Operating Officer.

He undertook the Commercial Review of all the BBC's commercial activities and was responsible in 2004 for the sale of BBC Technology to Siemens Business Services, and in 2005, he led the sale of BBC Broadcast to Creative Broadcast Services Limited, a Macquarie Company. This company became Red Bee Media. He was Chairman of BBC Studios, and Post Production.

In July 2004, John Smith took the helm at BBC Worldwide becoming CEO.

After taking over as CEO, Smith doubled BBC Worldwide's turnover and quadrupled its profits. He geographically diversified the business so that it had a more international focus. Under Smith BBC Worldwide was the largest TV distributor outside of US companies and became Europe's largest TV channel operator with over 360m subscribers to its BBC-branded portfolio of channels. Under Smith, BBC Worldwide created new relationships with UK independent TV producers and set up an international production business producing TV format hits such as Dancing with the Stars and Top Gear. In 2007, BBC Worldwide launched the commercial international website - bbc.com - which came into profit one year ahead of schedule and now has three international edition attracting 60 million unique users. The business has developed apps around its brands which have resulted in 25 million downloads and has attracted 23 million fans to its social media sites. Smith also launched the BBC's commercial Global iPlayer in many countries around the world, as well and the opening of the Doctor Who Experience, an interactive visitor attraction in London and live events ranging from Teletubbies to Strictly Come Dancing.

In 2009, BBC Worldwide's achievements were recognised with a Queen's Award for Exports.

Smith has been a Director of the British Academy of Film and Television Arts (BAFTA), the Henley Festival, the advisory board of the English National Opera (ENO) and vice-president of the Royal Television Society. He was also non-executive director at Burberry and a Fellow of both the Association of Chartered Certified Accountants and the Royal Society of Arts (RSA). Other directorships have included Severn Trent PLC, Vickers PLC, Travelport International, Hilding Anders AB, and Superdry PLC.

Smith won the Accountancy Age Financial Director of the Year Award in 2001. He was a member of the Accounting Standards Board for three years between 2001 and November 2004, the HM Treasury Public Services Productivity Panel, and a non-executive director of Severn Trent plc and Vickers PLC. John was a Council Member between 1996 and 1999. In 2004, he received an honorary Fellowship from the Royal Institute of British Architects (in the same year as John Prescott).

He is currently Chairman of Spin Group Ltd, Jungle Creations Ltd, Seeker Music Publishing.
