= Suicide of Nicola Ann Raphael =

Suicide of a bullied Scottish schoolgirl

Nicola Ann Raphael
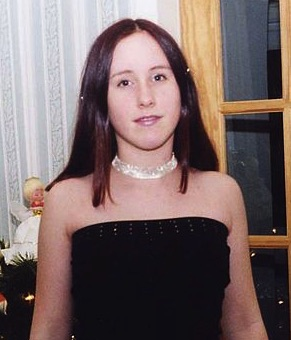
- Raphael in 1999
- Born: 10 September 1985; Glasgow, Scotland
- Died: 24 June 2001 (aged 15); Glasgow, Scotland
- Cause of death: Suicide by overdose
- Resting place: Auld Aisle Cemetery, Kirkintilloch, East Dunbartonshire, Scotland
- Occupation: Student

Nicola Ann Raphael (10 September 1985 – 24 June 2001) was a Scottish schoolgirl who died from suicide after enduring years of bullying because she dressed in a goth style. Her death on 24 June 2001 and allegations of bullying at her school, Lenzie Academy, led to coverage in the local and national press.

== Background ==
Nicola Ann Raphael was the only daughter of David and Rona Raphael, a civil servant with the Health and Safety Executive in Glasgow. She had two elder brothers, David and Christopher (Christopher's own experiences of being bullied at the school would also later be revealed in coverage). Nicola grew up in Lenzie and Kirkintilloch and attended the local state schools Millersneuk Primary and Lenzie Academy.

== Bullying incidents and death ==
Information requested for later legal action found that the bullying allegations went back over three years.

Raphael died after taking an overdose of her mother's painkillers in the early hours of Saturday, 23 June 2001, before going to bed. Initially thinking her daughter had slept in, Rona discovered Nicola unresponsive and still lying in bed that afternoon. She was pronounced dead the next day.

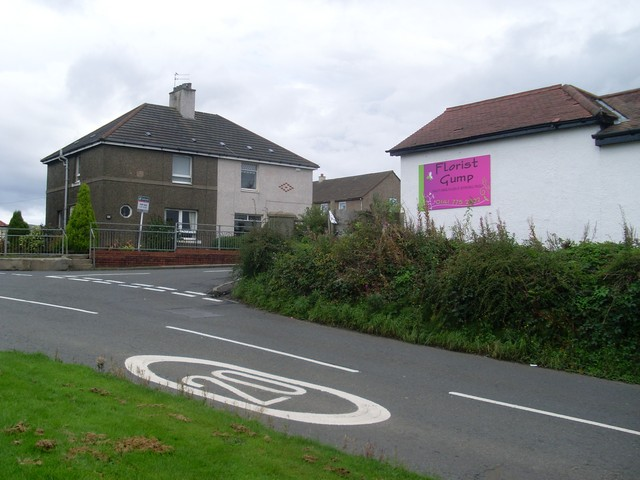
Raphael's last home in Loch Road Kirkintilloch (left)

== Reaction ==
The case is also notable in that it represented an early wave of media coverage of bullying by way of texting/mobile phones.

The case was also one of those cited by the Daily Record in the setting up of their "Save our Kids Campaign."

The issue was also raised in the Scottish Parliament by Lyndsay McIntosh MSP: "The minister mentioned children in his opening remarks, so I will channel his thoughts towards youngsters' being bullied. We should think about 16-year-old Nicola Raphael or 12-year-old Emma, who attended Broughton High School, both of whom committed suicide as a result of being bullied at school. I can think of nothing more crucial to the quality of life of our youngsters than that."

Shortly after her death, at a concert Raphael was due to have attended, Marilyn Manson was seen comforting her mother: "Performing in Glasgow last weekend, Manson dedicated his song "The Fight Song" to Nicola Raphael, 15, who overdosed on painkillers two months ago and was buried along with her ticket to the Manson show. After the concert, Manson met the girl's mother. "He was very caring and considerate," Rona Raphael told Scotland's Daily Record newspaper. "I was so touched that this megastar took time out to meet me. Despite all the controversy about him and his shows, he just seemed like a normal man to me...."

In June 2003 the story was also featured on Tonight: GIRLS AFRAID "A report on the dramatic increase in bullying by girls." The program interviewed both bullies and their victims and tried to look at various sides of the story. Raphael's mother spoke of what her daughter had gone through as well as whether she thought bullies would ever comprehend the possible consequences of how they acted.

The case was also cited as the reason for a Scotland wide spate of legal actions against education authorities due to bullying. "Mr Fyfe believes the recent spate of law suits may have been triggered by the highly publicised suicide of Lenzie Academy pupil Nicola Raphael, who killed herself after being victimised by fellow pupils for her taste in "Goth" music and clothes. Her mother, Rona, is suing East Dunbartonshire Council, claiming that school staff failed to protect her daughter from bullies despite repeated complaints."

Following the anniversary of Raphael's death, Strathclyde Police investigated vandalism and thefts at her grave site. Raphael's mother believed those who bullied her daughter were continuing their attacks even after the suicide.

Later commentary has said that "in many ways the suicide could be read as a grim warning of the strength of hatred that was to lead to Sophie Lancaster's death".

== Bullying review ==
The Scottish parliament and in particular Brian Fitzpatrick took an interest in the case and joined in the calls for reviews of anti-bullying policies at the school and in East Dunbartonshire as a whole.

"MSP Brian Fitzpatrick has welcomed the decision to review the anti-bullying policy at Lenzie Academy, after the tragic death of teenager Nicola Raphael in June." "Following a meeting with Lenzie Academy rector Roddy McLelland, Mr Fitzpatrick also welcomed the plans to improve the existing mentoring arrangements."

"He said: It is vital that a consistency of approach should be adopted. I will be pressing East Dunbartonshire Council to ensure that there are clearly delineated responsibilities across the authority for co-ordinating anti-bullying policy.

John Simmons, head of education at East Dunbartonshire Council, said: The council made a commitment last month to conduct an authority-wide review of the systems in place in all schools to deal with allegations of bullying."

== Organ donation ==
After Raphael's death, her organs were donated. Her family also were involved in National Health Service (NHS) organ donation campaigns and were later featured in a 2005 BBC TV documentary on organ donation entitled Life on the List where they met a young boy named Jack who was one of the recipients. The Life on the list documentary was broadcast widely and won a Peabody award that year.

Her heart was frozen and able to be used over three years later to save the life of a toddler. Although Raphael had carried a donor card for several years hospital staff did not ask the family about donation. Instead Raphael's mother had to approach staff herself to make sure her daughter's wishes were carried out.

== Stop bullying campaign ==
After Raphael's death, her friend Ashley and others including her family were inspired to create an anti-bullying website/campaign to highlight the extent to which bullying goes on.

"Last month, Ashley took a further stand against bullying when she went online to offer advice and help to other victims of playground torment.

She set up a website and email address and invited bullied children too afraid to tell an adult to write in with their experiences.

She has been inundated with messages and now intends to compile figures from the emails to launch an anti-bullying campaign in a bid to force the Scottish Parliament and her local council to take action.

She says: "I was amazed at how many people wrote to me with their stories – and just how many people are being bullied."

Tim Field was among those who became involved and was one of many who termed Raphael as a victim of bullycide.

== See also ==
- Bullying UK
- Discrimination of subcultures
- List of suicides attributed to bullying
- Mental health in the United Kingdom
- Youth suicide
