= Suicide of Sladjana Vidovic =

2008 Ohio student suicide

Sladjana Vidović
- Vidović at age 16
- Born: Slađana Vidović; April 4, 1992; Bosnia and Herzegovina
- Died: October 2, 2008 (aged 16); Mentor, Ohio, U.S.
- Cause of death: Suicide by hanging
- Resting place: All Souls Cemetery, Chardon, Ohio; 41.5923°N 81.2683°W (approximate)
- Education: Mentor High School
- Occupation: Student
- Known for: Victim of bullying and suicide
- Parents: Dragan Vidović (father); Celija Vidović (mother)

Sladjana Vidović (Croatian: Slađana Vidović, April 4, 1992 – October 2, 2008) was a 16-year-old student at Mentor High School in Mentor, Ohio who died by suicide by hanging herself after enduring extensive bullying by several classmates over issues such as her ethnicity, accent, name, and appearance.

Vidović's parents had repeatedly contacted Mentor High School staff to complain about the abuse their daughter endured at the school and her acute state of distress following months of "merciless bullying", requesting their concerns be resolved, although staff failed to effectively address their concerns.

The suicide of Sladjana Vidović drew nationwide attention to the bullying culture at Mentor High School, which had seen at least five pupils die by suicide between 2005 and 2008 due to bullying at the school.

== Early life ==
Sladjana Vidović was the second of three children born to Dragan and Celija Vidović. Her parents were Bosnian Croats who hailed from Kiseljak, but had relocated to Croatia as refugees during the Bosnian War. Sladjana spent her early childhood in Croatia before the family immigrated to the United States. The family moved to northeast Ohio in 2001, when Sladjana was nine years old. Initially, the family resided in Willoughby, Lake County, before relocating to Mentor.

Vidović has been described as a pretty, energetic, and charming girl who enjoyed dancing and cooking and who was proud of her heritage. Her father, Dragan, would later recollect of his daughter, "Nonstop smile, nonstop music", adding his daughter would occasionally drag him out of his chair and dance around in circles to music with him.

=== Schooling ===
According to Vidović's suicide note, although other children at McKinley Elementary School in Willoughby occasionally mocked her accent and efforts to communicate in English, she did not suffer severe bullying at Ridge Elementary School, although the school bullying she endured began at this school. McKinley Elementary staff did make efforts to include her in school functions and provide assistance with language barriers. However, her parents did attempt to transfer their daughter to another school due to harassing phone calls made to their home during a summer recess. (Note: The Vidović family did not speak any English prior to their arrival in the United States.)

== Bullying ==
=== Ridge Junior High School ===
While still attending Ridge Junior High School in 2005, Vidović began attending guidance counseling sessions, (Note: Vidović would also frequently attend guidance counseling sessions while attending Mentor High School, although existing records of these sessions indicate the majority of the sessions dated between September 2007 and February 2008.) frequently reporting her difficulties in forming friendships, her clothing, accent, name and ethnicity being mocked and her enduring accusations of being a lesbian sourcing from rumors regarding her limited interactions with many of her male peers. She had also been unable to connect with other Croatian diaspora students due to cultural differences. She is first known to have threatened to commit suicide to a Ridge Junior High School counselor in April 2007. The severity of the bullying her daughter endured in junior high school led to her mother requesting her daughter be transferred to another junior high school in the district. This request was denied.

Staff at Mentor's Ridge Junior High School also noted Vidović exhibited problems with social interactions, which included her being the victim of and—in response—participant in name-calling. She also had difficulties applying herself to her studies.

Vidović did try to make friends with her peers at this school. Her younger brother, Goran, would later recollect the almost daily bullying his sister endured at Ridge Junior High School and, later, Mentor High School, would frequently result in Vidović returning home from school upset and/or in tears.

=== Mentor High School ===
The bullying Vidović endured increased greatly following her enrollment at Mentor High School in August 2007. As had earlier been the case at Ridge Junior High School, students would mock her for issues such as her distinctive accent and her Eastern European name, with classmates—some of whom had previously been her friends—regularly referring to her as "Slutty Jana" and "Sladjana Vagina."

In one incident dating from November 2007, a teenage boy named Jerry Markley pushed Vidović down a staircase, but remained unpunished by staff for the incident because of his elite athletic status. The incident was determined by the school to have been an accident. (Note: On the evening of this particular incident, Vidović attempted to stab herself in the kitchen of her home. According to subsequent legal documents, she later invited this individual to her sixteenth birthday party.) In another instance, a girl struck Vidović in the face with a water bottle. (Note: This incident occurred on the final day of the 2007-2008 school year. Shortly after the beginning of the following school year, an intake officer from the Lake County Department of Jobs and Family Services discussed the possibility of Vidović being home schooled with her family.) She is also known to have had her locker door slammed into her hand on at least one occasion, and her purse stolen and its contents emptied onto a table. Likely due in part or whole to this increased bullying, Vidović's school attendance record rapidly declined in tenth grade, and she is known to have occasionally skipped classes and detentions.

Her older sister, Suzana, also recalled that prank callers would frequently phone her sister, or send messages to her cell phone, telling her she and her family should "go back to Croatia", otherwise either she would be "dead by morning" or her tormentors would find her after school. A friend of Vidović, Jelena Jandrić, later remarked: "Sladjana did stand up for herself, but toward the end she just kind of stopped because she couldn't handle it. She didn't have enough strength."

== Suicide ==
On October 2, 2008, Vidović died by suicide by tying one end of a rope around her neck and the other around a bed post before jumping out her bedroom window. She was 16 years old. Her body was discovered by her sister, Suzana.

In her four-page suicide note—written in both English and Croatian—Vidović wrote that, for more than half her life, she had endured bullying from classmates. Her suicide note extensively detailed the abuse she had endured at the hands of her tormentors at school, listing issues such as being criticized for her accent, enduring derogatory insults such as being called a "slut" and a "whore", and enduring people throwing food and drinks at her during lunchtime, leading to her eating her lunch alone in the school bathroom. Professing her love for her parents and siblings, Vidović expressed her belief her existence only made everyone close to her sad, and that she had never made anybody happy in her life. She ended her suicide note by stating: "I cannot believe I am doing this to myself because I could not wait to grow up and become something but I know I will never become a better child."

Vidović had withdrawn from Mentor and enrolled in an online school approximately one week before she killed herself.

=== Funeral ===
At least three of Vidović's bullies made a point of attending her wake, held just days after her death. Reportedly, these three tormentors also mocked her body in her coffin at this service. Vidović's sister would later recollect three of her sister's tormentors—in full view of her family—approached Sladjana's open casket, then laughed, later commenting on social media sites such as Myspace that the pink dress and sandals upon Vidović's body—which she had planned on wearing to her prom—were unattractive.

== Aftermath ==
Following their daughter's suicide, Vidović's parents, siblings and many of her friends directly laid the blame for her death on the staff and pupils at both her junior and high school. In interviews, her family have emphasized they had repeatedly begged faculty members of both schools to intervene with regards to their daughter's ongoing bullying, informing staff at her high school their daughter had become extremely depressed, had both threatened and attempted suicide, and had been hospitalized as an outpatient at an adolescent mental health facility in Lake County due to her extreme emotional state. Both parents adamantly maintained the school failed in their promises to address their repeated concerns.

Although a safety plan had been devised following a meeting between the Vidović family and faculty members on January 3, 2008, during which a safety plan was devised to address Vidović's bullying prior to her returning to school from the adolescent mental health facility on January 15, no affirmative action was taken, with her counselor not sending an e-mail to staff members alerting them to Sladjana's bullying and extreme mental and emotional state until September. Moreover, when her family attempted to retrieve all school records regarding their reports of bullying and resulting actions taken, school officials informed them the records had been lost during a 2010 update between differing computer record systems. (Note: In the days immediately following his daughter's October 2008 suicide, Dragan Vidović made the first of three unsuccessful attempts to obtain all school records pertaining to his daughter's counseling sessions, the meetings between her family and faculty members, and actions taken to address her bullying.)

On December 27, 2024, Celija and Dragan Vidović were discovered dead from gunshot wounds in their home in Painesville, Ohio. Police ruled the deaths a murder-suicide, which had occurred on Boxing Day. Celija and Dragan were later buried beside their daughter.

=== Lawsuit ===
The families of Sladjana Vidović and 17-year-old Eric Mohat (another Mentor High School student who died by suicide due to bullying) sued the school in 2009 and 2010 respectively. Both lawsuits alleged violations of the parents' 14th Amendment right to due process clauses. Neither family demanded compensation in their lawsuit, but sought to raise awareness of the situation and circumstances leading to their children taking their own lives, and the lack of effective measures by the school to address the bullying culture.

The lawsuit filed by Vidović's parents specifically named the Mentor High School principal, the school's superintendent, and Vidović's guidance counselor, alleging many school officials knew of their daughter's ongoing bullying, her acute state of depression and previous threats and attempts at suicide, but that little had been done to address the problem. Furthermore, the lawsuit alleged the school had ignored some of its own policies which required officials to investigate any allegations of bullying and to submit written reports to the principal whether these allegations were substantiated or not.

In January 2013, all charges in this lawsuit were dismissed by U.S. District Court Judge Donald C. Nugent, who ruled the bullying Vidović endured did "not rise to the level of severe and pervasive harassment", as previously defined by the United States Supreme Court. Nugent concluded that though the educational system has a duty to protect its students, this duty does not rise to the level of a constitutional guarantee and thus no violation of constitutional rights had occurred. In contrast to previous reports, Nugent also ruled no evidence existed the bullying Vidović endured was based on her nationality or ethnicity.

"People say, '[Bullying] has been going on forever.' A lot of things have been going on forever that we don't endorse: murder, rape, war ... that doesn't make it okay to wash your hands of [the issue]."

— Alix Lambert, director of the documentary film Mentor, reflecting on society's attitude to the issue of bullying. 2015.

== Documentary film ==
The parents of Vidović and Mohat were featured in a documentary film titled Mentor, which premiered on December 9, 2014. This 79-minute documentary focuses upon the overall culture of bullying at Mentor High School; outlining the abuse both teenagers endured and the efforts made by both sets of parents to address their concerns prior to their children's suicide.

Although some locals praised the director's efforts, the documentary provoked severe criticism and threats of violence from local students and community members, who believed the school was being targeted unfairly over an issue that "occurs everywhere". Much of this criticism was directed against director Alix Lambert, whom many accused of solely interviewing the family members of Vidović and Mohat and their lawyer, but not school officials, teachers or other students. This response caused Lambert to remark that she had invited several faculty members and other Mentor students to submit to interviews, but none had agreed, adding: "When an entire student body is sending threatening tweets to a filmmaker in New York and the film isn't even out yet, that's a problem. It serves as evidence that the problem didn't go away and is an illustration of what is happening in Mentor."

== See also ==
- Bullying and suicide
- Bullying in School Settings
- Depression in childhood and adolescence
- List of suicides that have been attributed to bullying
