= Bullying in information technology =

Form of workplace bullying

As a result of advances in technology, information technology has become a highly important economic sector. Although it is relatively new, this industry still experiences many of the workplace culture problems of older industries. Bullying is common in IT, leading to high sickness rates, low morale, poor productivity and high staff turnover. Deadline-driven project work and stressed-out managers take their toll on IT professionals.

Bullying in IT is most commonly downwards hierarchical (such as manager to employee) but can also be horizontal (such as employee to employee) or upwards hierarchical (such as employee to manager).

== Incidence ==
In 2002, a survey of UK staff by Mercer Human Resource Consulting found that 21% of respondents in the IT industry have been bullied once or more in the past year. Seven per cent claimed to have suffered chronic bullying.

In 2005, the Chartered Management Institute conducted a survey of IT managers, finding that more than three out of 10 managers have been bullied during the last three years.

In 2008, the Chartered Management Institute conducted a survey of IT managers, finding that 61% witnessed bullying between peers and 26% had witnessed subordinates bullying their managers.

In 2008, a survey carried out by trade union Unite of IT professionals showed 65% believed they had been bullied at work, and 22% had taken time off work because of stress caused by bullying.

In 2014, IDG Connect conducted research which showed that 75% of 650 IT professionals surveyed claimed to have been bullied at work, while 85% said they had seen others bullied. This report formed part of an extensive series of articles conducted by the editor.

The press release stated: "These results in no way prove that things are worse in IT than elsewhere, and are weighted by the self-selecting nature of the study. However, via a blend of new statistics, detailed feedback from over 400 in-depth testimonials, along with insight from a range of industry experts, this report paints a pretty comprehensive picture of a seemingly endemic problem."

== Impact ==
Impacts of a bullying culture can include:

- Victims are stressed and take more sick leave
- Damage to the productivity, morale and performance of the whole company
- High staff turnover which may exacerbate any skill shortages
- Giving a company a bad reputation, making it harder to get good staff and get new business.

== Manifestations ==
Victims reported:

- Unachievable deadlines (see setting up to fail)
- Excessive monitoring and supervision (see micromanagement)
- Constant criticism on minor matters (see hypercriticism)
- Being ridiculed, humiliated and intimidated
- Being marginalised and asked to do pointless or ill-defined work below their capabilities.
- Being ostracised (see social rejection)

== Comments from victims and researchers ==
Comments from victims and researchers include:

- Internal grievance procedures are commonly not impartial and are open to abuses of power - the bully himself may have a close relationship with the investigating party and there may be conflicts of interest (see quasi-judicial)
- Complaining against the bully may only make the bullying worse and the victim may fear repercussions
- Victims often conclude that the only solution is to leave the company or the Information Technology industry altogether
- IT professionals may be technically brilliant but often lack social skills (soft skills)
- Some managers may be technically "hands-off" and feel threatened by the technical skills of their subordinates
- There is often a culture of cronyism, protectionism and jobs for the boys
- Middle managers are prone to being bullied from above and/or below in the hierarchy
- A high percentage of senior IT management possess very poor people skills or may have a narcissistic personality
- Mediation needs to be done by a fully trained impartial external mediator with a good track record, which are not available at most workplaces
- A system to report bullying anonymously may be helpful
- Victims often have misplaced loyalty with a company and stay too long trusting that they would get support
- Bullying in IT is often encouraged and institutionalized as a way of boosting competitiveness among employees
- Information Technology bullies may use their advanced computer skills to hack into their victim's computers and/or participate in cyberbullying against their victim

== Case studies ==
- Collins T Bullied NHS information manager gets £150,000 Computer Weekly 13 January 2010
- Customer services manager for software development department in a government organisation being privatised Case Histories at BullyOnline No 2 - Tim Field
- Bullying in computing and IT in the NHS Case Histories at BullyOnline No 42
- Bullying in the computing industry - Case Histories at BullyOnline No 100
- Bullied IT project manager

== See also ==
- Counterproductive work behavior
- Destabilisation
- Toxic leader
- Workplace bullying
