= Laura Mitchell =

Laura Mitchell may refer to:

- Laura Mitchell (superintendent), American academic administrator, superintendent for Cincinnati Public Schools
- Laura Mitchell (politician), Scottish politician, member of the Scottish Parliament
