= Suicide of Hamed Nastoh =

Canadian high school student who killed himself because of bullying

Hamed Nastoh
- School portrait of Nastoh
- Born: December 18, 1985; Abbotsford, British Columbia, Canada
- Died: March 11, 2000 (aged 14); New Westminster, British Columbia, Canada
- Cause of death: Suicide by jumping
- Resting place: Forest Lawn Memorial Park
- Education: Enver Creek Secondary School
- Occupation: Student

Hamed Nastoh (December 18, 1985 – March 11, 2000) was a Canadian high school student who killed himself by jumping off the Pattullo Bridge due to bullying.

== Early life ==
Nastoh was born on December 18, 1985, in Abbotsford, British Columbia. His parents, Nasima and Karim, had moved from Afghanistan to Canada a year prior to escape the Soviet-Afghanistan War. Nasima, who had a degree in psychology, worked at Immigration, Refugees and Citizenship Canada, while Karim, a professor of geography and history, sold Persian rugs.

Nastoh attended Enver Creek Secondary School in Surrey with his brother, Abdullah. Nastoh was described as an intelligent student with a passion for horror movies, literature, dance, and music. Nastoh, then 14 years old, was bullied in person. In a note, he mentions to his parents that high school was terrible for him, everyone in his school would call him "gay", "fag", "queer", "four-eyes" and "big-nose" because his average grades were above 90 percent. He left a suicide note saying "I hate myself for doing this to you," he wrote to his parents. "I really, really hate myself, but there is no other way out."

The Nastoh family lived on 143rd Street in Surrey, approximately 10 kilometres (6.2 mi) away from the Pattullo Bridge, which crosses the Fraser River and connects Surrey to New Westminster. At 5:00 pm, Nastoh's mother, father, and younger brother David left the house to visit a neighbour, leaving Hamed and Abdullah by themselves. While Abdullah took a shower, Hamed put on his new Tommy Hilfiger jacket, left the house and made his way, likely by bus, to the Pattullo Bridge. Upon reaching the bridge, Nastoh jumped to his death.

=== Investigation ===
After finishing his shower, Abdullah noticed that Hamed was gone. He phoned his parents, and Kirim hurried home to investigate. Upon finding the note Hamed had left, Kirim contacted the Royal Canadian Mounted Police (RCMP). Hamed did not give any hints about how he killed himself, and the RCMP searched around Nastoh's home.

The following day, police found Nastoh's body in the Fraser River, just south of the Pattullo Bridge. He wore a blue Nike backpack filled with rocks to weigh himself down, which the coroner deemed "unnecessary." Nastoh died from blunt trauma after his eye hit a rock in the water at around 108 kilometres per hour (67 mph). The only visible injury was a scratch on his nose.

One week before his death, Hamed had attended a suicide awareness seminar at Enver Creek Secondary School, given by a mother who had lost her son. In his note, Hamed wrote that he'd given his parents a "hint" when he mentioned that the speaker had said that suicidal people give hints.

== Aftermath and impact on schools ==
=== Homosexuality issues high school course ===
Hamed's suicide prompted the Government of British Columbia to introduce the Grade 12 Homosexuality issues course. This course was developed in 2007 and is considered an elective course for Grade 12 high school students.

This course was meant to prevent a trial in court before the British Columbia Human Rights Tribunal, which made the agreement to listen to a gay couples complaints that secondary schools in British Columbia are blameworthy of prejudice by not talking about sexual identities as how the curriculum expects.

As a comeback, the Liberal Party of Canada agreed with the Government of British Columbia in developing this course, which discusses the topic of tolerance, especially how it relates to sexual identities, ethnicity and race. However, the course will not be mandatory in 37 secondary schools in British Columbia that represent over 8,000 students.

=== Hamed Nastoh's Anti-Bullying Coalition ===
Hamed mentioned in his suicide note for the reader to go to all the secondary schools in Surrey. He wanted other students to know that all forms of bullying can have a bad impact on the victim. Listening to his message, Nasima formed Hamed Nastoh's Anti-Bullying Coalition, to raise awareness of bullying in elementary and high schools, and help parents of children suffering from bullying. Nasima has presented Hamed's suicide note and story to numerous schools in British Columbia.

His mother states her message is clear and simple: "Suicide is not the solution." Using her son's suicide note to show how much he suffered in high school before committing suicide, Nasima hopes to give support to teenagers and the community and assure them they are not alone. Nasima said, "Seek help. If you don't talk about it nobody can hear," noting that children and teenagers are afraid of having discussions about being bullied if they notify their parents or teachers. Nasima says that Hamed Nastoh's Anti-Bullying Coalition has given her confidence to overcome her agony and misery.

== See also ==
- Cyberbullying
- List of suicides that have been attributed to bullying
