= Dead Aim =

Dead Aim may refer to:

- Resident Evil: Dead Aim, a video game
- Dead Aim (novella), a 2013 crime/suspense novella by American author Joe R. Lansdale
- DeadAIM, a modification of AOL Instant Messenger
