= Suicide of Rebecca Sedwick =

2013 American child suicide

Rebecca Sedwick
- Born: Rebecca Ann Sedwick; October 19, 2000; Sebring, Florida, U.S.
- Died: September 9, 2013 (aged 12); Lakeland, Florida, U.S.
- Cause of death: Suicide by jumping
- Resting place: Oak Hill Burial Park
- Education: Crystal Lake Middle School
- Occupation: Student

Rebecca Ann Sedwick (October 19, 2000 – September 9, 2013) was a 12-year-old American student at Crystal Lake Middle School in Lakeland, Florida who died by suicide when she jumped off a concrete silo tower. Investigation into her death led to a conclusion of in-person and cyberbullying contributing to the decision to take her own life. Sedwick's family later filed a lawsuit in relation to her death.

== Background, history and suicide ==
Rebecca Sedwick and her family were originally from Sebring, Florida. While battling with depression and anxiety, she began to engage in self-mutilation by cutting. At one point, Sedwick was hospitalized for three days as a result of her actions. After returning to school, an incident in a hallway with another student played a role in the decision to remove Sedwick from public school and begin the process of homeschooling. Her mother also deactivated her social media accounts and took away her mobile phone.

After returning to the public school system and transferring to another school to give her a fresh start, Rebecca was given her mobile phone privileges back and she opened accounts on services such as Kik, Ask.fm and Voxer. Snapshots later emerged of anonymous comments that were written to Sedwick on Ask.fm saying things like "Nobody cares about you", "you seriously deserve to die" and "drink bleach and die". It was later determined that, as the bullying grew worse, Sedwick was beginning to have suicidal thoughts. These thoughts were discovered to have begun about a year prior to her death. The investigation also showed new conflicts with students at school and Sedwick was withdrawn from public school in February 2013.

A search of Rebecca's mobile phone and computer uncovered internet searches like "What is overweight for a 13-year-old girl?" and "How much Advil do you have to overdose in order to die?" Pictures of Sedwick with razor blades lying on her arms were shown on her mobile phone and her mobile phone wallpaper showed pictures of her head resting on the edge of a railroad track. Before her death, she changed her name on one of her mobile phone apps to "That Dead Girl", and messaged a 12-year-old friend in North Carolina saying, "I'm jumping, I can't take it anymore."

Following a media investigation, it was revealed that, a week prior to Rebecca's death, she received messages on her phone asking her why she was still alive and telling her to go kill herself.

On September 9, 2013, Sedwick was found dead after jumping off an abandoned cement plant. At the time of her death, Sedwick was a seventh grade student at Crystal Lake Middle School in Lakeland, Florida.

== Investigation and arrest ==
On October 14, 2013, two minor girls were charged with aggravated stalking, and accused of bullying Sedwick during an argument over a boy she was dating. The charges would later be dropped due to a lack of evidence.

== Aftermath and reaction ==
Sedwick's mother established the Rebecca Sedwick Funeral Fund and Anti-Bullying Campaign, receiving donations to support anti-bullying awareness education and programs for children and teens with mental health problems. The campaign's goal was to raise $5,400 to pay for the costs of Rebecca's funeral, with any additional funds being donated to The Jaylens Challenge Foundation, a local non-profit organization dedicated to promoting awareness and prevention of bullying through education and community service.

== See also ==
- Bullying
- List of suicides that have been attributed to bullying
