= AIM Ad Hack =

- Developer: Cuban-Aftermath Software
- Final release: 6.23 / March 8, 2011; 15 years ago
- Operating system: Microsoft Windows
- Type: Add-on
- License: Freeware

AIM Ad Hack was a free third-party add-on for AOL Instant Messenger (AIM) created by Cuban-Aftermath Software. The add-on removes advertisements from the GUI of AIM. AIM Ad Hack can also be used to remove spyware such as Viewpoint Media Player and WildTangent, which were commonly included in AIM installations. Unlike add-ons like DeadAIM, AIM Ad Hack actually modifies AIM itself to remove advertisements and spyware, making it unnecessary for the program to load every time AIM is started.

== Operation ==
AIM Ad Hack may be run as a stand-alone program or as an add-on to an existing installation of AIM. When AIM Ad Hack is run, it downloads the AIM setup files if AIM is not already installed, and it prompts the user which components of AIM should be blocked or removed. It also provides the option of downloading plugins from AOL and various third-party plugins from AOL Greenhouse. If there is any malware or spyware found on the computer from a previous installation of AIM, such as WeatherBug or WildTangent, AIM Ad Hack will remove it as well.

== See also ==
- AOL Instant Messenger
- DeadAIM
