= Jungle Creations =

British digital media company

- Type: Privately held company
- Industry: Digital media
- Founded: 2014
- Founder: Jamie Bolding (CEO)
- Headquarters: London, United Kingdom
- Number of locations: New York
- Area served: Global
- Website: junglecreations.com

Jungle Creations is a British digital media company that operates themed channels including VT, Twisted, Lovimals, Level Fitness, Craft Factory and Four Nine. Jungle Creations is based in London with an office in New York City.

== History ==
=== VT ===
In 2014, Jamie Bolding founded Viral Thread at his mother's house in Surrey, England. Initially, the site's focus was on collating already existent content, however, Bolding soon started writing original content aimed at university students. The first piece of content produced was a listicle entitled "Twenty people you will meet at fresher's week."

In 2016, the VT channel posted a video featuring the Hövding airbag bicycle helmet which became the most-watched video in the company's history with over 150 million views.

In June 2017, the company opened an office in New York City. The following month, it named Nat Poulter its chief operating officer and Sefton Monk its chief technology officer. In August 2017, the company officially changed the name of Viral Thread to VT.

=== Twisted ===
Jungle Creations launched the Twisted brand in March 2016. Initially, the brand posted food-related content on Facebook and Instagram but later added an option to order through Deliveroo or Uber Eats.

The media brand opened new TV studios at London's Market Hall West End in 2019.

In September 2016, the company's food-related channel, Twisted, partnered with Oreo to announce new Oreo flavours.

=== Outside investment ===
In 2018, the company raised £3million in series A funding, from Edge Investments and former BBC Chief Executive John Smith. At the time, their plan was to explore commerce-based income streams such as pop-up restaurants, cookbooks and eCommerce, whilst expanding their services to include long-form content such as documentaries and TV mini series.

== Controversies ==
In February 2017, Jungle Creations attracted some controversy when it posted and began licensing a viral video featuring a female bicyclist being catcalled by men in a van. The video ended with the woman ripping the side mirror off the van and cycling away.

== Recognition ==
Forbes Magazine placed the company's founder, Jamie Bolding at 13 on their 2017 30 under 30 list. The organisation reached fourth place on The Sunday Times Tech Track 100 league table, and reached 14th place on The Financial Times 1000 fastest growing companies in Europe.
