= Suicide of Ryan Halligan =

2003 suicide of an American boy

Ryan Halligan
- Ryan Halligan
- Born: Ryan Patrick Halligan; December 18, 1989; Poughkeepsie, New York, U.S.
- Died: October 7, 2003 (aged 13); Essex Junction, Vermont, U.S.
- Cause of death: Suicide by hanging
- Resting place: Holy Family Cemetery, Essex Junction, Vermont, U.S.
- Occupation: Student
- Website: Memorial site

Ryan Patrick Halligan (December 18, 1989 – October 7, 2003) was an American student who died by suicide at age 13 after being bullied by his classmates both in-person and online. According to the Associated Press, Halligan was repeatedly sent homophobic instant messages, and was "threatened, taunted and insulted incessantly".

Halligan's father, John P. Halligan, a former IBM engineer, subsequently lobbied for laws to be passed in Vermont to improve how schools address bullying and suicide prevention. John has also given speeches at schools in other states about the story of his son.

Halligan's case has been cited by legislators in various states proposing legislation to curb cyberbullying. In Vermont, laws were subsequently enacted to address the cyberbullying problem and the risk of teen suicides, in response. In 2008, his suicide and its causes were examined in a segment of the PBS Frontline television program entitled "Growing Up Online." Halligan's suicide has also been referenced in many other news stories on bullying.

== Biography ==
=== Early life ===
Halligan was born on December 18, 1989, in Poughkeepsie, New York, the son of John P. and Kelly Halligan. His family moved to Essex Junction, Vermont, where Halligan attended Hiawatha Elementary School and, later, Albert D. Lawton Middle School.

Halligan was described by his father as a "gentle, very sensitive soul," who experienced some developmental delays affecting speech and physical coordination in his early school years. Although Halligan overcame those difficulties by the fourth grade, "he still struggled; school was never easy to him, but he always showed up with a smile on his face, eager to do his best," said his father.

=== Bullying ===
==== 2000–2001 ====
When Halligan was in the fifth grade, he started to suffer bullying at the hands of a group of classmates because of his learning disorder, passion for music (drums and guitar), and love for drama. Halligan's father said that when Halligan told him he was being picked on, his initial response was to ignore the boys, as they were just bullying Halligan with words. His family later said in a short documentary that Halligan enrolled in counseling, with little success. After that he moved up to middle school, where the bullying continued when Halligan was in the seventh grade.

==== 2002–2003 ====
In December 2002, Halligan told his father that the bullying had started again. Halligan asked for a Tae Bo Kick Boxing set for Christmas in order to learn how to defend himself. At first, Halligan's father wanted to go to the school principal and sort things out, but Halligan insisted that he wanted to learn how to fight, believing that complaining to the school about the boys would make things worse. After Christmas, Halligan and his father developed a routine of practicing downstairs in the basement for two hours every night. After learning how to defend himself, Halligan's father told him not to pick fights at school, but said that if any student ever touched him aggressively, Halligan had his father's permission to defend himself.

In February 2003, Halligan had a fight with a bully, which was broken up by the assistant principal; after that, the bully stopped bothering him. Halligan's father said that he was proud of his son for sticking up for himself. Toward the end of seventh grade, Halligan told his father that he and the bully had become friends. Halligan's parents warned him to be careful about the friendship, because the bully had been harassing Halligan for a long time. The two boys were friends for a short amount of time. After Halligan told the bully about an examination required after he had stomach pains, Halligan learned that the bully misused the story to spread a rumor that Halligan was gay.

==== Summer 2003 ====
According to his father and news reports, Halligan spent much of his time online during the summer of 2003, particularly on AIM and other instant messaging services. Halligan did not tell his parents about this. During the summer, Halligan was cyberbullied by schoolmates who taunted him, thinking Halligan was gay. He was also bullied at school about this; his father later learned that on one occasion, Halligan ran out of the classroom in tears. As Halligan had unintentionally archived these online conversations on his hard drive when he installed DeadAIM, Halligan's father was able to read these discussions. Halligan had deliberately saved transcripts of online exchanges in which Ashley, a popular girl whom Halligan had a crush on, pretended to like him. Later at school, Ashley told Halligan that she was only kidding and that Halligan was a "loser". According to an ABC Primetime report, Ashley had been Halligan's friend and defended him when the bullying first started, but as she became more popular, Ashley left Halligan behind. He found out she only pretended to like Halligan to gain personal information about him. Ashley copied and pasted their private exchanges into other IMs among Halligan's schoolmates to embarrass and humiliate him.

After Ashley had called him a "loser", Halligan said, "It's girls like you who make me want to kill myself." His father found out about this later because it was a matter of record with the local police. Halligan's father also discovered some disturbing conversations between Halligan and a boy with a screen name that he did not recognize. Halligan began communicating online with a pen-pal about suicide and death, and told him he was thinking about suicide. They had been exchanging information they had found on sites relating to death and suicide, including sites that taught them how to painlessly kill themselves. The pen-pal answered, "Phew. It's about fucking time," shortly after Halligan had told him he had been thinking about suicide, two weeks before Halligan killed himself. This was the last conversation Halligan had with the pen-pal. As Halligan's father found out, contrary to popular belief, Halligan's pen-pal was a boy he knew up until the third grade, when the boy and his parents moved away. When they found each other online, they reconnected.

The pen-pal had, according to Halligan's father, turned into a very negative person with a bleak outlook on life. Online, the boys discussed how much they hated their popular classmates and how they made them feel. The pen-pal suggested suicide as a way out, writing, "If you killed yourself you would really make them feel bad." Halligan's father said that the boy was the worst possible friend that Halligan could have had at that time.

The parents acknowledged that Halligan had discussed some of his worries and brought up suicide. Halligan had told them his report card would be bad, and worried that his parents would be disappointed in him. One night, Halligan asked his father if he had ever thought of suicide, who responded that he had, but also said, "Ryan, imagine if I did do that. Look at all the things we would have missed out on as a family."

=== Death and subsequent cyberbullying scandal ===
On October 7, 2003, Halligan's father was away on a business trip. Early in the morning, when the other family members were still sleeping, Halligan hanged himself with a bathrobe tie that belonged to his older sister Megan, who later found his body.

Although Halligan left no suicide note, his father learned of the cyberbullying when he accessed his son's computer. Halligan's father checked his son's yearbook first and found the faces of the bullying group scribbled out. Halligan had scribbled over the face of the ringleader (the same boy who bullied Halligan, befriended him, and then started the gay rumor) so aggressively that he had torn the paper. John accessed his son's computer and first learned of the cyberbullying when his son's friends told him.

When John learned that Ashley was being blamed for Halligan's suicide, he had her brought over to his house. John reportedly said to her, "You did a bad thing, but you're not a bad person." She appeared with Halligan on ABC's Primetime to speak out against bullying. Although the Halligans moved out of Vermont, Ashley still maintains contact with them.

John later confronted the bully who had started the gay rumor after finding out that he made fun of how Halligan killed himself. Initially, John was so angry that he wanted to go to the boy's house and "crush that little jerk," but had time to think about it while stuck at a junction. John reportedly said to the boy, "You have no idea the amount of pain you caused my son. And you're still bullying him now even when he's defenseless and you are still lying to your parents about it. I refuse to believe that you are so cruel and that you don't have a heart." Shortly afterward, the bully broke down in tears and repeatedly apologized for what he did. John wanted to file charges against the bully, but the police said there was no criminal law that covered the relevant circumstances. Halligan forgave the boy as well as Ashley. After learning the name of the pen-pal, Halligan's father went to his house and talked with his parents. John said that he did not want the pen-pal to use the conversations for "something dark." While at the pen-pal's house, John learned that the boy's father never received any hard copies of the conversations. The pen-pal's mother came and pulled out the hard copies from under the sofa, showing them to the father for "what appeared to be the first time." While the father was looking at the copies, the mother threw Halligan out. John said that he never got a satisfying response from the boy or his family. He still visits the boy's website, which contains several references to death and suicide.

John soon began lobbying for legislation in Vermont to improve how schools address bullying and suicide prevention. He has also given speeches to schools in various states about the story of his son and the devastating effects of cyberbullying among teens.

Vermont enacted a Bullying Prevention Policy Law in May 2004 and later adopted a Suicide Prevention Law (Act 114) in 2005, closely following a draft submitted by Halligan's father. The law provides measures to assist teachers and others to recognize and respond to depression and suicide risks among teens. Halligan's case has also been cited by legislators in other states proposing legislation to curb cyberbullying.

Halligan's story was featured on a Frontline television program entitled "Growing Up Online", produced in January 2008, by WGBH-TV in Boston and distributed nationwide over PBS. In it, his father recounts his shock upon discovering the extent of the abuse his son endured, saying he believes that bullying on the internet "amplified and accelerated the hurt and pain he was trying to deal with, that started in the real world." Halligan's story has also been featured on Oprah in a report they did on a rise in homophobic teasing in schools. In addition, he presented his powerful assembly to many schools across the country.

== See also ==
- Harassment by computer
- Suicide prevention
- Suicide of Tyler Clementi
- Suicide of Megan Meier
- Suicide of Phoebe Prince
- Suicide of Amanda Todd
- Suicide of Nicola Ann Raphael
