= Suicide of Kelly Yeomans =

Suicide of an English schoolgirl

Kelly Yeomans
- School portrait of Kelly Yeomans in 1996
- Born: Kelly Louise Yeomans; 13 December 1983; England
- Died: 28 September 1997 (aged 13); Allenton, Derby, England
- Cause of death: Suicide by painkiller overdose
- Education: Merrill Academy
- Occupation: Student

The suicide of Kelly Louise Yeomans (13 December 1983 – 28 September 1997), a 13-year-old English schoolgirl from Allenton, a suburb of Derby, became widespread news when the cause was blamed on bullying, to which she had been subjected by other local children.

== Incident ==
In evidence to the court, Yeomans was described as a pleasant and friendly girl. However, she was reported to be the victim of repeated harassment and taunting, particularly about her weight. Her parents said that the incessant bullying had left Yeomans feeling miserable. Her mother asserted that she had gone to her daughter's school, Merrill Academy, thirty times to complain about the issue, but received no assistance. School officials, however, claimed they had received only one complaint.

Matters came to a head in September 1997, when a group of delinquent youths reportedly gathered at Yeomans's home on several consecutive nights, on each occasion throwing eggs, margarine, butter, cakes, and mud at the house and shouting taunts aimed at Yeomans. Her mother later said that the incident prompted Yeomans to tell her family, "It is nothing to do with you Daddy, nothing to do with you Mummy, and nothing to do with you Sarah [her sister]. I have had enough and I'm going to take an overdose."

The parents said they were worried and sought help for their daughter's obvious depression, but did not believe she would carry out her threat to take her own life. However, Yeomans was soon found dead in her bedroom by her father and sister after taking an overdose of co-proxamol, a painkiller her mother used for a knee problem.

After they admitted having done so, five youths between the ages of thirteen and seventeen were convicted of intentionally harassing Yeomans in the months leading up to her death. They were sentenced to attendance centre orders. For a time, Yeomans's death put the issue of child bullies and their victims into the public spotlight.

In his 2003 recording More Jack than God, former Cream bass guitarist Jack Bruce wrote a tribute to her – "Kelly's Blues".
