= Mary Ronan =

Interim Superintendent of Norwood City School District
- Incumbent
- Assumed office September 24, 2019
- Appointed by: Norwood Board of Education

Superintendent of the Cincinnati Public Schools
- In office August 1, 2008 – August 1, 2017
- Appointed by: Cincinnati Board of Education
- Preceded by: Rosa Blackwell
- Succeeded by: Laura Mitchell

Personal details
- Education: Xavier University (MBA); University of Cincinnati (Bachelor's Degrees in Education, Philosophy, Biology)

Mary Ronan was the Superintendent for Cincinnati Public Schools from 2009 until 2018.

She holds bachelor's degrees in biology, education and philosophy and a master's degree in business administration.

She began her career at Cincinnati Public Schools as a math and science teacher at Merry Middle School.

In 2021, in her former capacity as superintendent, and as an individual, she was sued by the family of Gabriel Taye, who died by suicide in 2017 following years of severe bullying at his Cincinnati elementary school. A video documented an assault on Taye by two students in a restroom at the school that rendered him unconscious for seven minutes. Ronan said he fainted. The suit was settled for $3 million and the creation of an anti-bullying system.

Ronan announced she would retire in August 2016, and she retired a year later.

She was replaced by Laura Mitchell, who said she would institute an "aggressive approach to bullying." Ronan came out of retirement in 2019, when she was appointed Norwood City School District's Interim Superintendent.
