= Suicide of Kenneth Weishuhn =

American anti-gay bullying victim (1997–2012)

Kenneth Weishuhn
- Born: Kenneth James "Rodney" Weishuhn Jr. May 27, 1997; Sheldon, Iowa, U.S.
- Died: April 14, 2012 (aged 14); Primghar, Iowa, U.S.
- Cause of death: Suicide by hanging
- Resting place: Pleasant Hill Cemetery, Primghar, Iowa, U.S.
- Education: South O'Brien High School
- Known for: Suicide
- Parent(s): Kenneth J. Weishuhn Sr. Jeannie Chambers (née Barrows)

Kenneth Weishuhn (May 27, 1997 – April 14, 2012) was an American teenager known for his suicide as a result of being bullied for being gay.

== History ==
Kenneth James "Rodney" Weishuhn Jr. attended South O'Brien High School as a freshman in Paullina, Iowa, along with his sister Kayla, a sophomore. Weishuhn, then 14 years old, was bullied in person, received death threats on his mobile phone, and was the subject of a Facebook hate group. He was targeted for being gay, having come out one month before his suicide. The bullying was characterized as "aggressive", "merciless", and "overwhelming". In response to the bullying, Weishuhn killed himself in April 2012. He hanged himself in the family's garage and was discovered in the early morning hours on April 15, 2012, by stepfather Kenny Chambers.

A vigil was held at the Cedar Rapids 1st Avenue Bridge on April 24, 2012. A Facebook group dedicated to Weishuhn's memory gained about 1500 followers within the week of his suicide, which is double the number of people in his home town. Funeral services were held at Grace Lutheran Church in Primghar and burial was at Pleasant Hill Cemetery in Primghar.

== Effects and aftermath ==
=== National attention ===
Weishuhn's suicide prompted nationwide coverage of bullying and its effect on LGBTQ youth. Coverage of the suicide and the bullying that prompted it appeared in the Huffington Post, the Washington Post, Queerty, Fox News, the Sioux City Journal, Daily Kos and many other outlets.

USA Today questioned if bullies should be treated as criminals in reference to Weishuhn and his suicide and announced: "Tragic suicides such as K.J.'s have galvanized educators into a zero-tolerance stance on bullying, and a recent analysis by the U.S. Department of Education shows that state lawmakers nationwide are increasingly willing to criminalize bullying behavior, even as experts wonder whether doing so will have the intended effect: to curb the behavior and improve the learning atmosphere."

The Des Moines Register wrote "Kenneth Weishuhn's name has been invoked far and wide in the struggle to stem bullying and advance gay rights" and reported on singer Madonna flashing Weishuhn's photo on stage in the middle of her European concert tour.

Weishuhn's mother has said she was unsure if she wants to pursue charges against the school or the bullies. She stated: "I really don't want to ruin somebody else's life, or take someone else's son or daughter from them. But, I don't know what it's going to take to get it to stop." Later in 2012, prosecutors could not find sufficient evidence to prosecute anyone for specific criminal acts. As laws in Iowa do not cover bullying, O'Brien County Sheriff Michael Anderson said he agreed with the decision not to file charges.

=== Family troubles ===
Weishuhn's suicide was hard on the family, with sister Kayla stating she was "traumatized" by events and still had to attend school with the bullies through the remainder of her high school years.

== See also ==
- Bullying
- Gay bashing
- Suicide among LGBTQ people
