= DeadAIM =

DeadAIM (originally De-Ad AIM) was a program created by James Dennis to add new features such as tabbed conversations (which ended up later being available in standard AIM until its shutdown) and to disable the advertising in AOL Instant Messenger (AIM). The last release of DeadAIM was version 4.5 in 2003.

In mid-2003, the rights to DeadAIM were sold to America Online effectively ending the development of the program.

JDennis was able to modify the framework of AIM with the use of API hooking. DeadAIM used an OCM file, similar to a DLL, to load into AIM. JDennis had benefited greatly by creating somewhat of a partnership with AOL. This allowed him to add several features more easily and also allowed him to create DeadAIMRegIn, an official AOL bot, to confirm registration information and prevent software piracy.

== See also ==
- AIM Ad Hack
- AIM+
- Comparison of instant messaging clients
