= Laura Mitchell (superintendent) =

American academic administrator

Superintendent of the Cincinnati Public Schools
- Incumbent
- Assumed office August 1, 2017
- Appointed by: Cincinnati Board of Education
- Preceded by: Mary Ronan

Personal details
- Education: Bennett College (Bachelors in Elementary Education); University of Cincinnati (Masters in Education Administration)

Laura Mitchell was the Superintendent for Cincinnati Public Schools. After a 27-year career with CPS, she resigned on June 11, 2021 "to embrace a new calling". She was voted in by the Cincinnati Board of Education on May 9, 2017. She was the successor of retiree Mary Ronan, who served as Superintendent for nine years.

== Profession ==
Laura Mitchell began her career at Cincinnati Public Schools as a teacher at a now-defunct elementary school, Central Fairmount, which resided in the Cincinnati neighborhood of South Fairmount. She also served as both an assistant principal and a principal within the same school district. At the time of her promotion, Mitchell was serving as the Deputy Superintendent and Chief Academic Officer for the district. Mitchell worked to increase the academic achievement of "under-performing" schools in Cincinnati Public Schools, helping elevate the district to the rating of "Effective". She has been nationally recognized for her efforts, having won the State of Ohio Senate Commendation and House of Representatives Tribute for Nationally Recognized Educator, and the Milken Educator Award in 2002 as the principal of Westwood Elementary.

== Superintendent appointment ==
Laura Mitchell was one of 58 candidates for the position. She was voted in unanimously on May 9, 2017.
