= Suicide of Gabriel Taye =

2017 suicide of elementary school student

- Location: Cincinnati, Ohio
- Date: January 26, 2017
- Victim: Gabriel B. Taye

Gabriel B. Taye (February 21, 2008 – January 26, 2017) was an 8-year-old elementary school student in Cincinnati, Ohio who committed suicide due to school bullying. The subject of significant national media attention, a lawsuit filed against the Cincinnati Public School district resulted in reformed anti-bullying protocol.

== Background ==
Taye was bullied at Carson Elementary School in Cincinnati for three years prior to his death. His two front teeth were extracted after he was hurt on the playground in first grade. Students hit Taye two times in second grade. In third grade, he was attacked and injured three times.

In January 2017, two students knocked Gabriel unconscious in a school restroom. During the seven minutes he was unconscious, other students kicked and laughed at him. His mother, who was told he had fainted, kept him home the following day. He returned to Carson Elementary on January 26 and a classmate tried to flush his Batman water bottle down the toilet. He died the same day.

Hamilton County coroner Lakshmi Sammarco initially requested that Taye's death be ruled a homicide because he did not believe that an 8-year old had died by suicide. Footage of the bathroom assault was released on May 12, 2017. Sammarco reopened the investigation.

Taye's mother said she was unaware of the bathroom incident. She stated that school administrators concealed the bullying, and were "deliberately indifferent" to the "treacherous school environment."

== Trial ==
In mid-2021, Taye's family filed a wrongful death lawsuit against Mary Ronan as an individual and in her capacity as the school district's superintendent. The school district filed a motion to dismiss the suit. Ronan denied that Taye was bullied and claimed that the video of the incident showed Taye fainting. She also said the other boys in the restroom were "traumatized" because they believed they "caused his death."

Three judges of the 6th US Circuit Court of Appeals unanimously rejected the school's motion for dismissal. In her ruling, Judge Bernice Bouie Donald wrote: "This court finds their behavior, as alleged, to be egregious and clearly reckless, thus barring them from the shield of government immunity." She called Taye's experience “horrifying" and the Cinicinnati Public School arguments "unpersuasive," "meritless" and a "gross mischaracterization" of evidence.

== Legacy ==
The lawsuit filed by Taye's family resulted in a $3 million settlement to be paid by a nurse employed by the city and the Cincinnati Public School district.

Taye's death focused attention on bullying prevention. As part of the settlement, Cincinnati Public Schools agreed to new anti-bullying measures including staff training, increased efforts to identify bullying in school, and improved reporting policies for school nurses who suspected bullying.

In 2017, in Taye's memory, Cincinnati Bengals player Carlos Dunlap established a foundation to offer education about bullying. Taye's mother, Cornelia Reynolds, founded the Gabriel B. Taye Foundation to promote anti-bullying programs in 2018.
