= Crimes Amendment (Bullying) Act 2011 =

Act of the Parliament of Victoria, Australia

Parliament of Victoria
- Long title: An Act to amend the Crimes Act 1958, the Stalking Intervention Orders Act 2008 and the Personal Safety Intervention Orders Act 2010 and for other purposes.
- Citation: No. 20 of 2011
- Territorial extent: Victoria
- Passed by: Legislative Assembly
- Passed: 5 May 2011
- Passed by: Legislative Council
- Passed: 31 May 2011
- Royal assent: 7 June 2011
- Commenced: 7 June 2011
- Effective: 7 June 2011 (ss. 1–2); 12 December 2007 (s. 5(2)); 7 December 2008 (s. 8); 8 June 2011 (rest of Act)
- Date of expiry: 7 June 2012

Legislative history

Initiating chamber: Legislative Assembly
- Bill title: Crimes Amendment (Bullying) Bill 2011
- Introduced by: Robert Clark
- Introduced: 5 April 2011
- First reading: 5 April 2011
- Second reading: 6 April–5 May 2011
- Third reading: 5 May 2011

Revising chamber: Legislative Council
- Bill title: Crimes Amendment (Bullying) Bill 2011
- Received from the Legislative Assembly: 5 May 2011
- Member(s) in charge: Richard Dalla-Riva
- First reading: 5 May 2011
- Second reading: 5–31 May 2011
- Third reading: 31 May 2011

Amends
- Crimes Act 1958 (No. 6321 of 1958); Stalking Intervention Orders Act 2008 (No. 68 of 2008); Personal Safety Intervention Orders Act 2010 (No. 53 of 2010)

Summary
- The purpose of this Bill is to amend the Crimes Act 1958 in order to make the offence of stalking apply to situations of bullying, to make consequential amendments to the Stalking Intervention Orders Act 2008 and the Personal Safety Intervention Orders Act 2010 and to make minor amendments of a statute law revision nature.

Keywords
- Bullying
- Status: Expired

The Crimes Amendment (Bullying) Act 2011 (No. 20 of 2011), informally referred to as Brodie's Law, was an amendment to the Victorian Crimes Act 1958 which makes serious bullying an offence punishable by a maximum penalty of 10 years' imprisonment. The law is named after Brodie Panlock, a 19-year-old who took her own life after being bullied at work. Brodie Panlock's parents, Damien and Rae Panlock, successfully lobbied the Victorian Government to make the amendment.

== Brodie Panlock ==
Brodie Rae Constance Panlock grew up in the outer eastern suburbs of Melbourne in the Australian state of Victoria with her parents and two older brothers. In early 2005, at age 18, Panlock started working at Cafe Vamp in Hawthorn, an inner suburb of Melbourne. In March 2006, shortly after her 19th birthday, Panlock moved to a small flat in Hawthorn to be closer to work. Cafe Vamp helped Panlock with references and lent her the bond money for the flat. She worked 12 hours a day, 6 days a week, and was described as a "loyal employee" and a "buoyant, chirpy, compassionate, patient, giving girl" by co-workers. Panlock had plans to save enough money to travel overseas with her brother and his girlfriend before enrolling at TAFE to study social work.

=== Bullying ===
Panlock became involved in an intermittent intimate relationship with cafe manager Nicholas Smallwood in the fifteen months leading up to her death. Panlock became infatuated with Smallwood, but the attention was not returned.

In the last few months Panlock's relationship with Smallwood became unhealthy, according to coroner Peter White, who found that Smallwood and others "systematically bullied her, both physically and emotionally". Smallwood, fellow waiter Rhys MacAlpine and, to a lesser extent, chef Gabriel Toomey, called her names and told her she was fat, ugly and a whore. They kicked and spat on her, held her down and poured oil on her hair and clothes, covered her in chocolate sauce and filled her kit bag with fish oil. Other employees intervened without effect, and the cafe owner Marcus Da Cruz turned a blind eye to the behaviour.

In May 2006, after being kicked out of Smallwood's apartment, Panlock made a suicide attempt. Smallwood later taunted Panlock that she could not do it properly, and put poison in her handbag.

=== Final days ===
On 20 September 2006, Smallwood left her flat after Panlock had begged him to stay. She called a former school friend, Ashlea Cooper, who gave evidence to the inquest. Cooper recalled that Panlock "cried hysterically" and felt that she had made a fool of herself, saying:

How embarrassing ... I want to die. Ash, it is over. I have had enough. It's over.

Shortly after 11:00pm on 20 September 2006, Brodie attempted suicide in Hawthorn; she died from her injuries in The Alfred Hospital three days later.

=== Penalty ===
Four men and MAP Foundation, the company that owned Cafe Vamp, were charged with offences under the Occupational Health and Safety Act 2004 for their part in bullying Panlock. They pleaded guilty to the charges on 8 February 2010, at the Melbourne Magistrates' Court. They were ordered to pay $335,000 in fines as follows:

- MAP Foundation – $220,000
- Marcus Da Cruz – $30,000
- Nicholas Smallwood – $45,000
- Rhys MacAlpine – $30,000
- Gabriel Toomey – $10,000

== Law reform ==
=== Victoria ===
Damien and Rae Panlock successfully lobbied the Victorian Government to make changes to the law to include serious bullying as an offence punishable by imprisonment.

On 4 November 2010, the Victorian Attorney-General asked the Victorian Law Reform Commission to review the adequacy of Victoria's criminal laws in dealing with serious bullying. The request was made to ensure that perpetrators of serious bullying receive appropriate sanction under Victoria's criminal law. On 5 April 2011, the Attorney-General introduced the Crimes Amendment (Bullying) Bill 2011 to Parliament, which amended the offence of stalking under section 21A of the Crimes Act 1958, to include serious bullying as a crime carrying a maximum penalty of ten years. The Bill received royal assent on 7 June 2011, and commenced immediately; it is colloquially known as "Brodie's Law".

In the five years since the law's proclamation on 16 June 2011, 58 offenders were charged with 140 offences against Brodie's Law.

=== National ===
The Victoria Attorney-General Robert Clark announced that Brodie's Law would be discussed at the Standing Committee of Attorneys-General in November 2011.

The response by the Victorian government was backed by the Federal Assistant Treasurer, Bill Shorten. In September 2011 the New South Wales Government was examining the Victorian legislation.

Damien and Rae Panlock continued to lobby the federal government because they feared that the states would fail to agree on the matter. On 26 May 2012, they met with Australian Prime Minister Julia Gillard and Bill Shorten, now Minister for Workplace Relations, and made a joint announcement of a national parliamentary inquiry into bullying. The report was released on 25 November 2012, and "contained 23 recommendations including the adoption of a new national definition of 'workplace bullying', a workplace bullying 'hotline' and a legislative and regulatory framework." In response to the recommendations the Federal Parliament passed the Fair Work Amendment Act 2013 which gave the Fair Work Commission jurisdiction to hear and resolve "a workplace incidence of bullying".

== Brodie's Law Foundation ==
In late 2012, Damien and Rae Panlock toured Victoria, using the first anniversary of the introduction of Brodie's Law to raise awareness about bullying.

Damien and Rae Panlock continue to tour Australia and speak in workplaces and at public events, to campaign against bullying. The foundation assists with education in workplaces, schools and sporting clubs, with speaking engagements and production of education packages for teachers, club members, employers, and employees.

In February 2017, Brodie's Law Foundation was formed and registered as a charity.

== See also ==
- Workplace bullying
- Toxic workplace
- Workplace aggression
