= AIM+ =

AIM+ was a free third-party add-on for AOL Instant Messenger created by Big-O Software.

Some special features include conversation logging, ad removal, cloning (which allows more than one instance of AOL Instant Messenger simultaneously), hotkeys, and transparency.

Pedram Amini discovered that AIM+ has contained an item of "spyware" which reports user statistics such as IP address, log-in time, profile information, etc. to the developer. Since version 2.2.1 (build 65), however, this feature has apparently been removed.
