= Tim Field =

British academic (1952–2006)

- Born: 24 April 1952; Eastbourne, U.K.
- Died: 15 January 2006 (aged 53)
- Education: North Staffordshire Polytechnic
- Occupations: Anti-bullying advocate, author
- Spouse: Susan Mitchener
- Children: 2

Tim Field (24 April 1952 in Eastbourne – 15 January 2006) was a British anti-bullying activist with his main focus relating to workplace bullying. He was the author of two books. In 2011, Field and a journalist Neil Marr coined the term "bullycide".

== Early life ==
Tim Field was born on 24 April 1952 in Eastbourne, England. From 1971 to 1975 he studied computing science in Stafford at the North Staffordshire Polytechnic, now University of Staffordshire, and was awarded a First Class Honours degree.

== Career ==
Field worked in the computer industry for nineteen years until he had to stop due to the effects of experiencing severe workplace bullying.

In 1996, Field founded the UK National Workplace Bullying Advice Line and the Success Unlimited website. He wrote and self-published a book, Bully in Sight, based on his own experiences, and impressions of calls to the advice line in 1996. First published with the long title Bully in Sight: How to Predict, Resist, Challenge and Combat Workplace Bullying, the first ten chapters of the book seek to define bullying and bullies. The second part offers suggestions on how to challenge and combat workplace bullying.

As a result of the expense and effort of defending himself against a libel action, in early 2004, Field closed down the National Workplace Bullying Advice Line and Bullying Times.

== Personal life, death and legacy ==
In July 1978 Field married Susan Mitchener, who he had met as a fellow-student at N. Staffs. Polytechnic. They had two children.

Field died from cancer on 15 January 2006, aged 53.

Tim Field set up bullyonline.org to inform people about workplace bullying. In 2015 the Tim Field Foundation was established as a UK registered charity to maintain this website and further Tim Field's cause against bullying.

== Works ==
- Field, Tim (1996). Bully in Sight: How to Predict, Resist, Challenge and Combat Workplace Bullying: Overcoming the Silence and Denial by Which Abuse Thrives. Wantage, England: Success Unlimited. ISBN 9780952912101. OCLC 40134889.
- Field, Tim; Marr, Niel (2001). Bullycide: Death at Playtime. Didcot, Oxfordshire: Success Unlimited. ISBN 9780952912125. OCLC 46513857.
