= Suicide of Dawn-Marie Wesley =

2000 Canadian student suicide

Dawn-Marie Wesley
- School photograph of Dawn-Marie Wesley, who died by suicide after intense bullying
- Born: 5 June 1986; Mission, British Columbia, Canada
- Died: 10 November 2000 (aged 14); Mission, British Columbia, Canada
- Cause of death: Suicide by hanging
- Occupation: Student

Dawn-Marie Wesley (June 5, 1986 – November 10, 2000) was a Canadian student who died by suicide after experiencing a cycle of bullying by psychological torture and verbal threats from three female bullies at her high school.

She left behind a note to her family that referred to the bullying to which she had been subjected: "If I try to get help, it will get worse. They are always looking for a new person to beat up and these are the toughest girls. If I ratted, they would get expelled from school and there would be no stopping them. I love you all so much." She hanged herself with a dog leash in her bedroom.

== Incident ==
At the age of 14, Dawn-Marie Wesley hanged herself with a dog leash in her bedroom after experiencing a cycle of psychological torture and verbal threats. She left a suicide note in which she said she was bullied by three female classmates. Wesley's body was discovered by her 13-year-old brother who had come to her room to call her to have dinner with the family. Mission's Royal Canadian Mounted Police found no crime had been committed, and some police officers were accused of a possible cover up, as one of the bullies accused was the daughter of an officer in the town. The incident garnered international media attention, which led to the groundbreaking investigation by Canada's Crown, and a precedent setting court case where for the first time in North American courts, teenage defendants were made to stand trial for bullying. Two of the teens pleaded guilty to Wesley's suicide, and the third was acquitted of all charges.

== Legal proceedings ==
The historic, landmark and precedent setting court case was presided over by Provincial Court Judge Jill Rounthwaite. It was noted that one of the girl bullies named in the suicide note was the daughter of a Royal Canadian Mounted Police Officer in Mission. Two girls were convicted of uttering threats with the intent to instill fear, and criminal harassment. Their identities are protected because they were prosecuted under Canada's Young Offenders Act. B.C. Provincial Court Judge Jill Rounthwaite's ruling stated that it was clear that one of the accused had bullied Wesley repeatedly thus giving the victim reason to fear for her life. Rounthwaite also stated that bystanders added "to the power of the bully" by letting the harassment continue without intervention.

== Documentary film ==
Rats & Bullies is a feature documentary film written, directed and produced by Roberta McMillan and Ray Buffer that investigated Wesley's suicide and offers solutions to teens, parents, teachers and school administrators on bullying. The film includes interviews with people involved in the tragedy and insight from educational experts.

Rats & Bullies was filmed on location on Mission, British Columbia, Canada; Abbotsford, British Columbia, Canada; Washington D.C.; and California (USA).
