= Enver Creek Secondary School =

Enver Creek Secondary
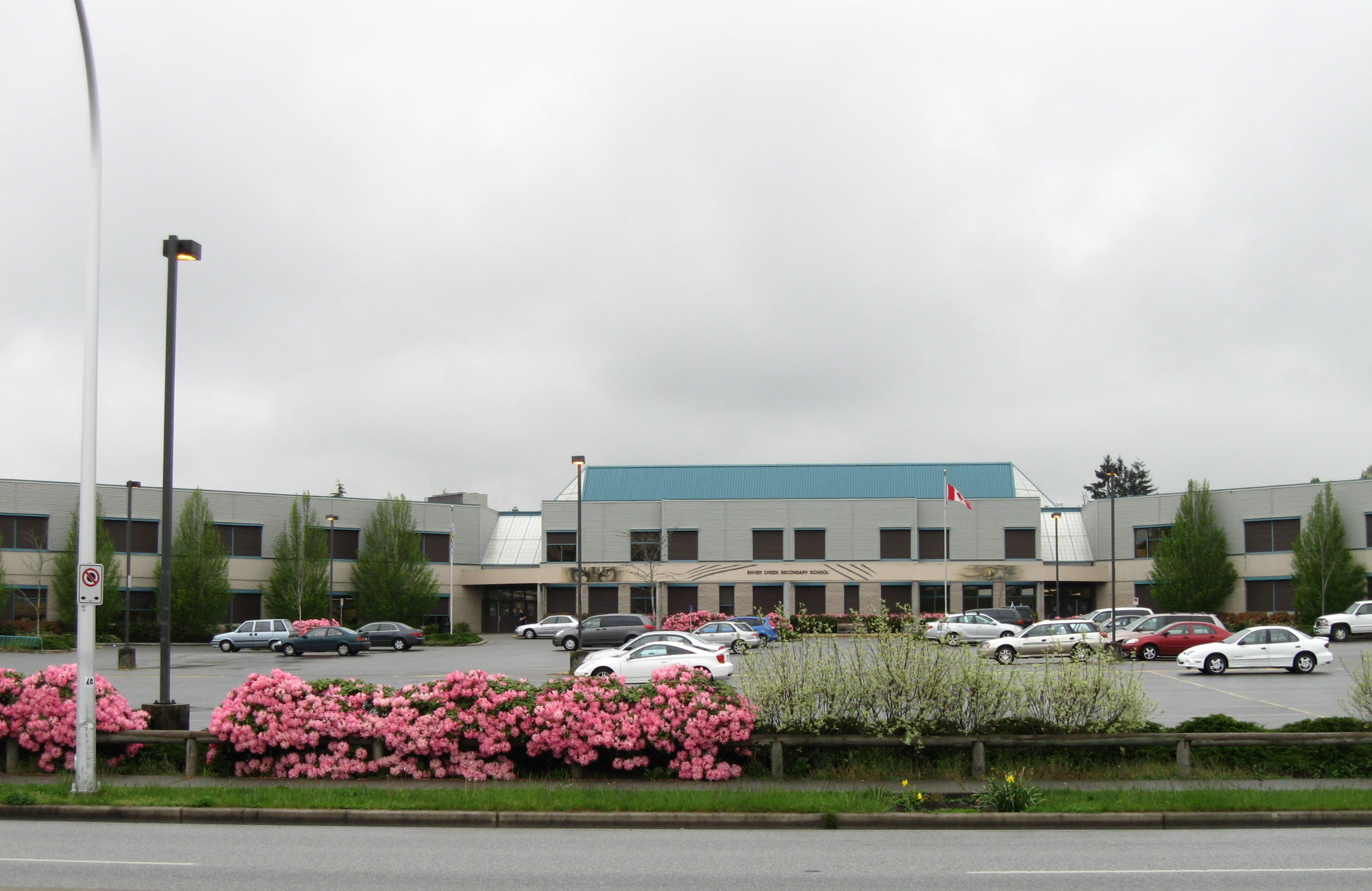

Location
- 14505 84 Ave; Surrey, British Columbia, V3S 8X2; Canada; 49.1568°N 122.8202°W

Information
- School type: Public, high school
- Founded: 1997
- School board: School District 36 Surrey
- Superintendent: Mark Pearmain
- School number: 3636114
- Principal: Mrs. Sandra Hogg
- Staff: 71
- Grades: 8-12
- Enrollment: ▼1411 (2025)
- Language: English
- Colours: Burgundy brown and Teal
- Mascot: Cougar
- Team name: Cougars
- Rivals: Queen Elizabeth Secondary, Frank Hurt Secondary and Fleetwood Park Secondary Schools.
- Feeder schools: Brookside Elementary, Green Timbers Elementary, Janice Churchill Elementary, Maple Green Elementary
- Website: www.surreyschools.ca/schools/envercreek

Enver Creek Secondary School is a public high school located in Surrey, British Columbia, Canada and is part of the School District 36 Surrey.

== Academics ==
Students are required to enroll in English, Social Studies, Mathematics, Sciences, and Physical & Health Education. Advanced Placement courses are available for Biology and Chemistry at the grade 12 level. Second language studies are offered in French, Spanish, and Punjabi. Physical & Health Education requirements allow students to select Physical & Health Education, Weight Training, Fitness, or Leadership. Elective areas of study span two main areas Applied Skills, which include Computers, Business, Woodwork, Metalwork, Electronics, Engineering, plus Foods or Chef Training. Fine Arts studies, which include Dance, Art, Media, Band, and Photography. The school operates on a semester system of two - 5 month terms. Many students also elect to enrol in free, full-credit summer school offered by the school district during the summer months.

=== Mathematics ===
Mathematics at Enver Creek are divided into three categories for different levels of career or post secondary preparation. In Math 10, the courses diverge into two levels for students to choose Workplace 10 or Foundations & Pre-Calculus 10. In Math 11, the courses diverge into 3 levels where students choose Workplace 11, Foundations 11, or Pre-Calculus 11. In Math 12, students have the option of choosing Foundations 12, Pre-Calculus 12, and Calculus 12 in preparation for post secondary. Math at the grade 12 level is optional.

== International students ==
The number of International students enrolled at Enver Creek doubled from 2010 to 2011. Students from a variety of countries travel to Enver Creek Secondary to study for usually one or two semesters.

== Athletics ==
The school won the Provincial AAA Senior Boys' Soccer Championship on November 26, 2011.

The Enver Creek Senior Boys' Basketball team finished third in the Surrey-wide RCMP basketball tournament in 2012. In 2011, the team won the tournament. The tournament invites all public and private, junior and senior, boys' basketball teams in the City of Surrey, British Columbia to participate.

=== Sports ===
The school generally offers 3 levels of individual and teams sports for both male and female students; grade 8's, juniors (grade 9 and 10), and seniors (grade 11 and 12). Enver Creek sports teams have done extremely well in the past 10 years, due in no small part to the commitment and motivation of the students coupled with the dedication, passion, and knowledge of the school coaching staff.

Enver Creek has a wide variety of sports teams, including:

- Badminton
- Basketball
- Cross country running
- Volleyball
- Soccer
- Track and Field
- Freestyle wrestling
- Ultimate

== Fine arts ==
Dance students won multiple awards at the Surrey District-wide dance competition, January 2012; Advanced Class placed 1st in the Senior Class Division.

The student body stays informed and entertained through Enver Creek T.V. (ECTV), a student-produced video presentation shown regularly over the school-wide broadcasting network.

Media Arts students won first and third place awards at the 2011 B.C. Student Film Festival. At the 2011 Surrey High School Film Festival, students were also recognized with a first-place finish and four finalist awards.

Drama students won multiple awards at the Surrey One-Act Drama Festival, February 2013 and 2018.

== Applied skills ==
The Enver Creek Robotics club finds success at the multi-school competition on Vancouver Island.

Enver Creek hosted the Regional 'Skills Canada' Competition for Cabinetmaking, March 2012.

== Annual School Events ==
Annually, Mathematics students compete nationally against their grade level. The contests are offered by the University of Waterloo. Grade 8: Gauss, Grade 9: Pascal, Grade 10: Cayley, Grade 11: Fermat, and Grade 12: Euclid. The names of contest winners are engraved on plaques that are permanently displayed in the Math wing of the school.

== Community involvement ==
=== Protecting the environment ===
The Green Team has become an integral part of the operation of Enver Creek School. Their mission is to raise awareness and keep the environment stable. The Team maintains a recycling program that recovers products from paper to electronics.

=== Blood donation ===
The school won the first annual Young Blood Challenge, in 2006–07, by donating more blood than any other school in British Columbia.

== Clubs and activities ==
The school offers a variety of extra-curricular clubs:

- Art
- Ball Hockey
- Bollywood/Bhangra Team
- Board Games
- Business
- Chess
- Dance Team
- Debate Club
- DJ Club
- Drama
- Environmental Club
- Gardening
- Grad Council
- Intramurals
- Math
- Multicultural Club
- Newspaper
- Outreach Charities
- Poetry
- Rainbow Alliance (GSA)
- Robotics
- Science Club
- Social Justice
- Student Council
- Weight Training
- WeCanSTEM

The students publish an award-winning school yearbook. There are also various student-organized events such as music nights, socials, and school dances which are organized by students and supervised by teachers and administrators.

== Notable graduates ==
Matthew Jarvis is a poker player known for his November Nine appearance in the 2010 World Series of Poker. He earned his first World Series of Poker bracelet at the 2011 World Series of Poker.

== Student suicide ==
Hamed Nastoh leapt to his death, from the Pattullo Bridge, in March 2000. He left a suicide note complaining about bullying. Now the school Action/Anti-Bullying Team (or A Team) under the title "Stand-UP-People" works school-wide to enhance peer relations in the general population. The results are thought to be positive changes to bullying, reduced use of inappropriate language and peer pressure, plus increased social responsibility and altruism, though it isn't a credible claim to say so without a credible source. Students also wear pink anti-bullying shirts annually in February.
