= Suicide of Mallory Grossman =

2017 suicide

Mallory Grossman
- Born: 2005
- Died: February 6, 2017 (aged 12); Rockaway Township, New Jersey
- Occupation: Student
- Known for: Mallory's Law; Mallory's Army Foundation

Mallory Rose Grossman (2005 – February 6, 2017) was a 12-year-old student at Copeland Middle School in Rockaway Township, New Jersey who committed suicide on June 14, 2017 due to school bullying and cyberbullying she received. Following her death, Mallory's Law was passed which strengthened school requirements for responding to harassment, intimidation and bullying.

== Background ==
Mallory Grossman had suffered bullying for months by a group of fellow students from Copeland Middle School in Rockaway Township, New Jersey. One allegedly texted her a picture of herself with the words "you have no friends" and another asked her "when are you going to kill yourself?" in front of other students.

== Death and aftermath ==
Following Mallory's death at home, her parents launched a non-profit organization, Mallory's Army Foundation to support bullying prevention. The family also produced the documentary Mallory in 2020.

On June 19, 2018, Mallory's parents Dianne and Seth Grossman filed a suit against Rockaway Township school district alleging that the school repeatedly ignored complaints that Mallory was being bullied. A $9.1 million settlement was reached on July 28, 2023, the largest bullying settlement in US history.

Rockaway Township superintendent Greg McGann resigned due to controversy surrounding Mallory's death.

=== Mallory's Law ===
Mallory's Law was signed into law on 13 January 2022 by Governor Phil Murphy. The law requires that schools officially document instances of bullying and increased fines for parents.
