= Alvaston Moor Academy =

Location
- Brackens Lane; Alvaston, Derby, Derbyshire, DE24 0AN; England; 52°53′20″N 1°26′38″W

Information
- Type: Academy
- Motto: Stronger... Together
- Department for Education URN: 148538 Tables
- Ofsted: Reports
- Head teacher: G Tyers
- Staff: 100+
- Gender: Co-educational
- Age: 11 to 16
- Enrolment: 864 (approx)
- Houses: Athenians, Spartans, Corinthians, Olympians
- Colours: Yellow, Red, Purple, Blue
- Website: https://www.alvastonmoor.co.uk

Alvaston Moor Academy is a secondary school for students aged 11–16 years, located in Alvaston, Derby, England, which opened in 2021. The school operated under the name Merrill College until 2012, and then as Merrill Academy from 2013 until 2021.
