= Bullying and suicide =

Bullying and suicide are considered together when the cause of suicide is attributable to the victim having been bullied, either in person or via social media. Writers Neil Marr and Tim Field wrote about it in their 2001 book Bullycide: Death at Playtime.

Suicide is completed when the victim cannot escape the chronic effects of bullying. They cannot find a way to cope that protects them and helps them to overcome their suffering. From this long-term carrying of emotional and physical scars, the individual develops feelings of hopelessness and helplessness. The bullying seems like it cannot be stopped for the victim and thus, resulting in suicide.

== Impact ==
Legal analysts criticize the term bullycide because it links a cause with an effect under someone else's control. Research shows those who are bullied have a higher probability of considering or performing suicide than those who are not. However, there are victims of bullying who do not end up committing suicide, and some of them share their experiences in order to send a positive message to bullying victims that suicide is not the only option.

Some of the risk factors associated with suicide from bullying are childhood trauma, nutritional deficiencies, and mental health issues such as, depression, anxiety, or PTSD. Consequently, the victim becomes more susceptible to a distressful bullying experience. Those well adjusted may also be affected by bullying. Such as, developing a mental health disorder, like depression or start rehearsing the thoughts of suicide.

== Risk factors ==
Risk factors for bullying and suicide include emotional distress, exposure to violence, family problems, problems within relationships, lack of connections to school or a positive school environment, alcohol and drug use, or lack of access to forms of social and emotional support.

== Statistics ==
=== Age groups ===
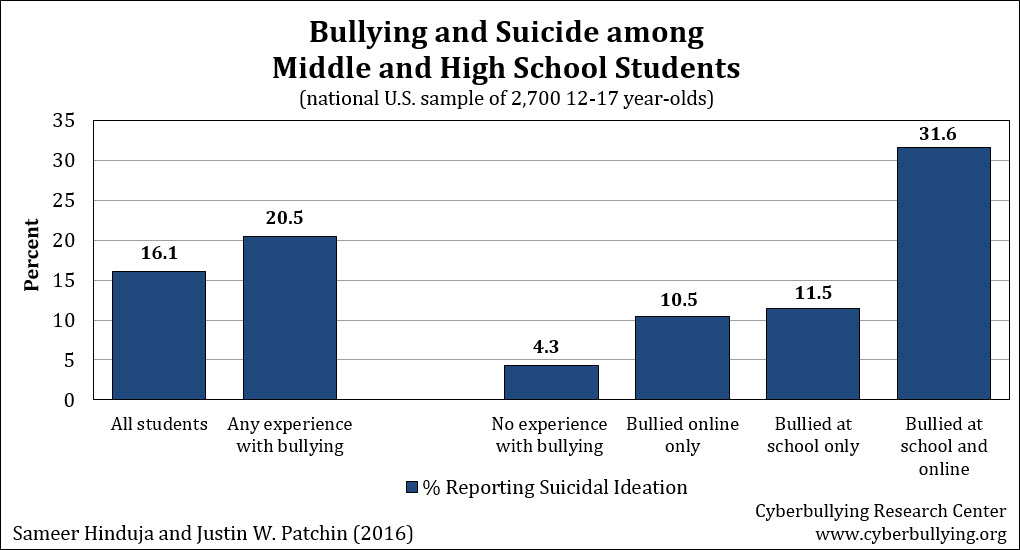
A chart to show percentage of American 12-17 that are suicidal, with each chart representing a certain demographic

Bullying is most often found in children and adolescents. In Erick Erickson's stages of psychosocial development, stage five, "identity verses role confusion." Occurs during the teenage ages of 12 to 18.

Prevention of suicide from bullying for children and adolescents can be alleviated from the support of parents. Being engaged in the child's life. Such as, daily activities, school, or work. Being aware of the child's friends. Changes in the child's life. Such as, lowered grades, physical bruises, or scars, eating and sleeping habits. Sharing personal social experiences, may lead the child to be open in their social experiences. These can help a child suffering from bullying.

In 2010, the suicides of teenagers in the United States who were bullied because they were gay or perceived to be led to the establishment of the It Gets Better project by Dan Savage. The online event, Spirit Day, was created in which participants were asked to wear purple as a symbol of respect for the deceased victims of bullying, particularly cyberbullying, and to signify opposition to the bullying of the LGBT community.

The Centers for Disease Control (CDC) states that almost 45,000 deaths occur from suicide each year. There are about 100 non-fatal suicide attempts to every 1 suicide. A little over 14% of students in high school consider suicide and approximately 7% of them attempt suicide. Students that are bullied are around 2 to 9 times more likely to consider suicide than non-victims. A study in Britain found that at least half of suicides among young people are related to bullying. 10 to 14 year old teen girls are most likely to commit suicide based on this study. According to ABC News, nearly 30% of students are either victims of bullies or bullies themselves and 160,000 kids stay home from school every day because they are scared of being bullied.

=== Cyberbullying ===
Cyberbullying is a form of aggression by using the internet and/or electronic communication, such as mobile phones, e-mail, and text message, to cause humiliation, terrorization, embarrassment, and/or psychological distress to a peer. In comparison to verbal bullying, a research study showed that adolescents who reported cyberbullying were 11.5 times more likely to have suicidal ideation, while those who have reported verbal bullying were only 8.4 times more likely. In another study, 75% of adolescents who experienced cyberbullying presented with higher suicidal ideation than those who have experienced verbal bullying. Furthermore, cyberbullying is becoming more prevalent and reoccurring than normal bullying in today's society with the increase in ownership of technology throughout the world. Cyberbullying in ways is worse than regular bullying since in a sense it does not have to stop since social media can follow you wherever you go and the bully in question can be harder to contain, which results in more consistent and harsher bullying between two parties. Lastly as the constant cyberbullying continues it can cause the victim to experience an array of emotions like anger, sadness, and loneliness which can lead to their state of mind completely changing that typically include anxiety and depressive habits. As this state of minds get worse it can even cause the victim to commit suicide.

Amanda Michelle Todd was a victim of cyberbullying and committed suicide. On October 19, 2012, at the age of 15, from British Columbia, Canada. She posted a video on YouTube, sharing her story of being stalked, used, being bullied at school and by online comments. Her story escalated when the online comments, cyberbullying, told her that she should have used another bleach to kill herself. This lead Todd to hang herself, not long after.

As of 2022, research has come to show that perpetrators of cyberbullying often report having a history of being bullied themselves, and their rates of suicidality are similar to those who are victims of cyberbullying.

=== Lesbian, Gay, Bisexual, Transgender (LGBTQ+) Youth ===
US lesbian, gay, and bisexual students attempt suicide 2–7 times more than heterosexuals, and up to one third of transgender people have made an attempt on their own life. Young adults of the LGBT community "must cope with developing sexual minority identity along with negative comments, jokes, and threats of violence". A research identified that 19 studies were linked to suicidal behavior in lesbian, gay, and bisexual (LGB) students to bullying at school. Lesbian, Gay, Bisexual, and Transgender students experience more bullying than heterosexual or cisgender students.

== See also ==
- List of suicides that have been attributed to bullying
