= Andromachus =

Andromachus (Ancient Greek: Ἀνδρόμαχος) is the name of a number of people from classical antiquity:

- Andromachus of Cyprus, 4th century BCE commander of the Cyprian fleet at the Siege of Tyre by Alexander the Great
- Andromachus (ruler of Tauromenium), 4th century BCE ruler of ancient Tauromenium, Sicily
- Andromachus (cavalry general), commander of the Eleans in 364 BCE who committed suicide after his army was defeated by the Arcadians
- Andromachus (son of Achaeus), 3rd century BCE Anatolian nobleman, son of Achaeus, and grandson of Seleucus I Nicator
- Andromachus of Aspendus, one of the commanders of the forces of Ptolemy IV Philopator at the Battle of Raphia in 217 BCE
- Andromachus (physician), two Greek physicians, father and son, who lived in the time of Roman emperor Nero in the 1st century CE
- Andromachus (grammarian), quoted in the Scholia on Homer and possibly the author of the 12th-century Etymologicum Magnum
- Andromachus Philologus, the 3rd-century CE husband of Moero and father of Homerus
