= List of suicides (BC) =

The following notable people died by suicide before the year 1 AD. This includes suicides effected under duress and excludes deaths by accident or misadventure. People who may or may not have died by their own hand, whose intent to die is disputed, or who are alleged to have been killed, may be included.

== Confirmed ==
=== A ===
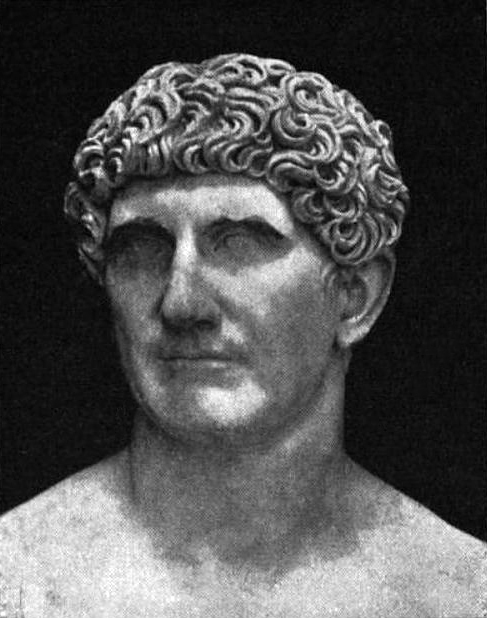
Mark Antony

- Adrastus (c. 550s BC), exiled son of Gordias, king of Phrygia
- Alcetas (320 BC), Hellenic general of Alexander the Great
- Alexander (220 BC), Seleucid satrap of Persis
- Amphicrates of Athens (86 BC), Greek sophist and rhetorician, starved himself
- Andromachus (364 BC), Eleian cavalry general
- Mark Antony (30 BC), Roman politician and general, stabbed with sword
- Archias of Cyprus (between 158 and 154 BC), Ptolemaic governor of Cyprus, hanging
- Titus Pomponius Atticus (32 BC), Roman banker, businessman, editor, author and friend of Cicero, starving himself

=== B ===
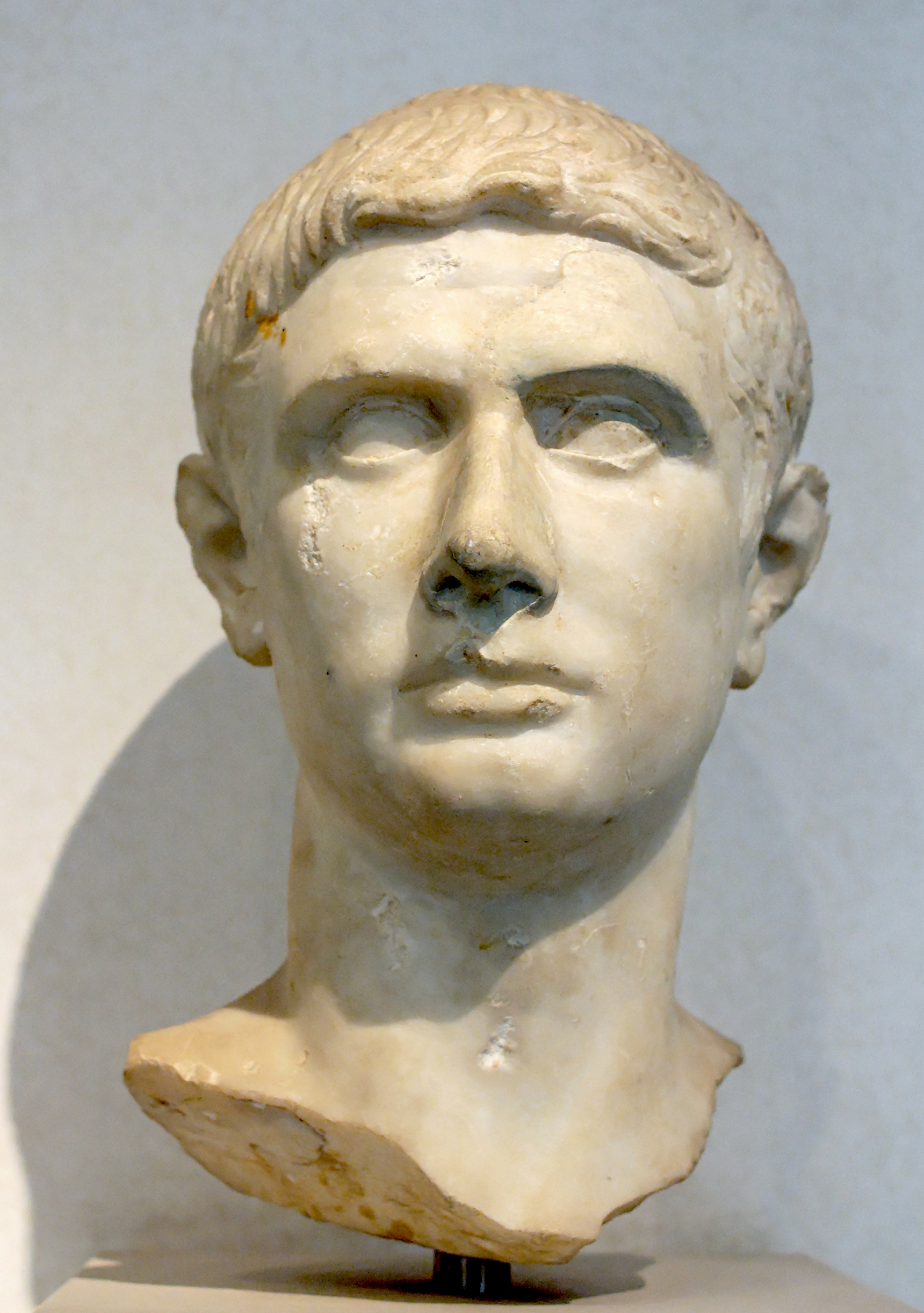
Marcus Junius Brutus

- Bai Qi (257 BC), Chinese general and commander of the Qin army, cut his throat with a sword
- Gaius Blossius (c. 129 BC), Roman philosopher and adviser to Tiberius Gracchus and Eumenes III
- Brennus (279 BC), Gallic tribal leader and general, stabbed himself
- Marcus Junius Brutus the Younger (42 BC), Roman politician and conspirator to assassinate Julius Caesar, ran into his sword

=== C ===
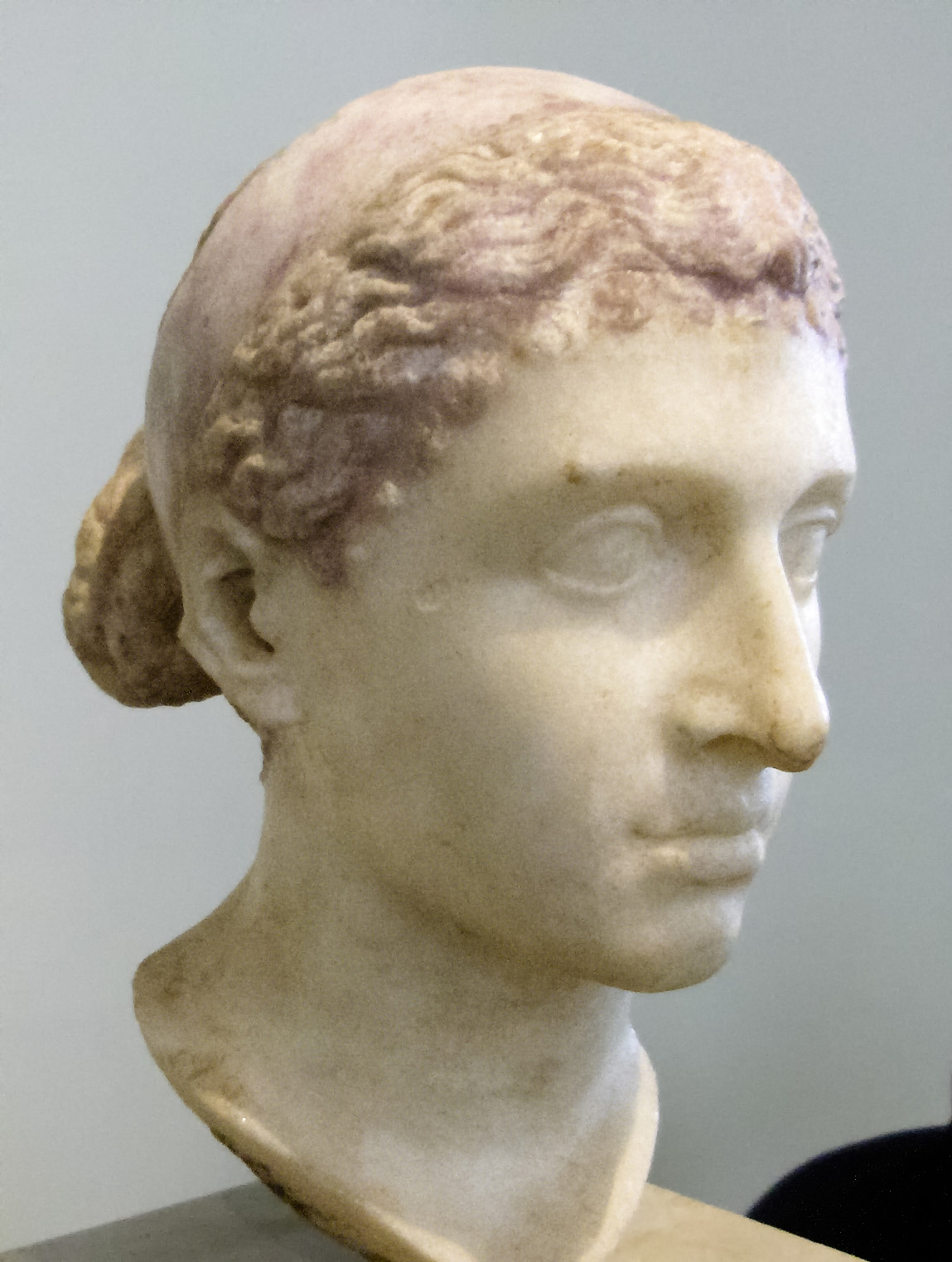
Cleopatra

- Calanus (323 BC), Indian gymnosophist and companion of Alexander the Great, self-immolation
- Novius Calavius (314 BC), Campanian nobleman, leader of an anti-Roman insurrection
- Ovius Calavius (314 BC), Campanian nobleman, leader of an anti-Roman insurrection
- Gaius Cassius Longinus (42 BC), Roman politician, general and conspirator to assassinate Julius Caesar, fell on his sword
- Cato the Younger (46 BC), Roman statesman and politician, stabbed with sword
- Censorinus (53 BC), Roman cavalryman and friend of Publius Licinius Crassus, ordered shieldbearer to stab him
- Charmion (30 BC), servant and advisor of Cleopatra
- Charondas (6th century BC), Sicilian-Greek lawgiver, stabbed himself with a dagger
- Cleomenes I (c. 489 BC), King of Sparta, slashed himself from shins to belly
- Cleomenes III (219 BC), King of Sparta
- Cleombrotus of Ambracia (after 399 BC), Greek philosopher, acquaintance of Socrates and Plato
- Cleopatra (30 BC), Queen of Egypt, inducing an asp to bite her
- Marcus Caecilius Cornutus (43 BC), Roman politician and general
- Publius Licinius Crassus (53 BC), Roman general, ordered shieldbearer to stab him

=== D ===
- Demosthenes (322 BC), Greek statesman, poison
- Diaeus (146 BC), Greek strategos of the Achaean League, poison
- Dioxippus (after 336 BC), ancient Greek pankratiast and Olympic champion, fell upon his sword
- Marcus Livius Drusus Claudianus (42 BC), Roman senator

=== E ===
- Empedocles (c. 430 BC), Greek philosopher, leapt into Mount Etna
- Eratosthenes (194 BC), Greek polymath and chief librarian at the Library of Alexandria, voluntary starvation
- Eurydice II of Macedon (317 BC), Queen of Macedon, hanging

=== F ===
- Gaius Fuficius Fango (40 BC), Roman general and politician
- Quintus Fulvius Flaccus (172 BC), Roman consul, hanging.
- Fusu (210 BC), Chinese prince and heir apparent of the Qin dynasty.

=== G ===
- Gaius Gracchus (121 BC), Roman politician, reformer and tribune, ordered a slave to kill him

=== H ===
- Hamilcar I of Carthage (480 BC), King of Carthage, self-immolation
- Hampsicora (215 BC), Sardo-Punic political leader, landowner and anti-Roman rebel leader
- Hannibal (ca 182 BC), Carthaginian commander during the Second Punic War, poison
- Himilco (396 BC), Carthaginian general, starving himself

=== I ===
- Iras (30 BC), servant and advisor of Cleopatra
- Silius Italicus (c. 103 AD), Roman consul, orator, author and poet, starvation

=== J ===
- Juba I of Numidia (46 BC), King of Numidia, double-suicide by sword with Marcus Petreius
- Judacilius (90 BC), Picentes general and leader, swallowed poison and ordered to be set on fire

=== L ===
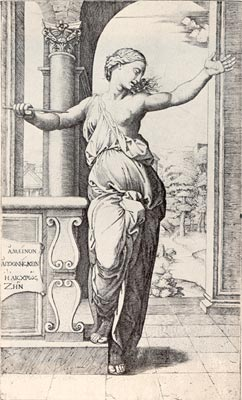
Lucretia's suicide by Marcantonio Raimondi (1534)

- Lucretia (c. 510 BC), Roman noblewoman, stabbed herself

=== M ===
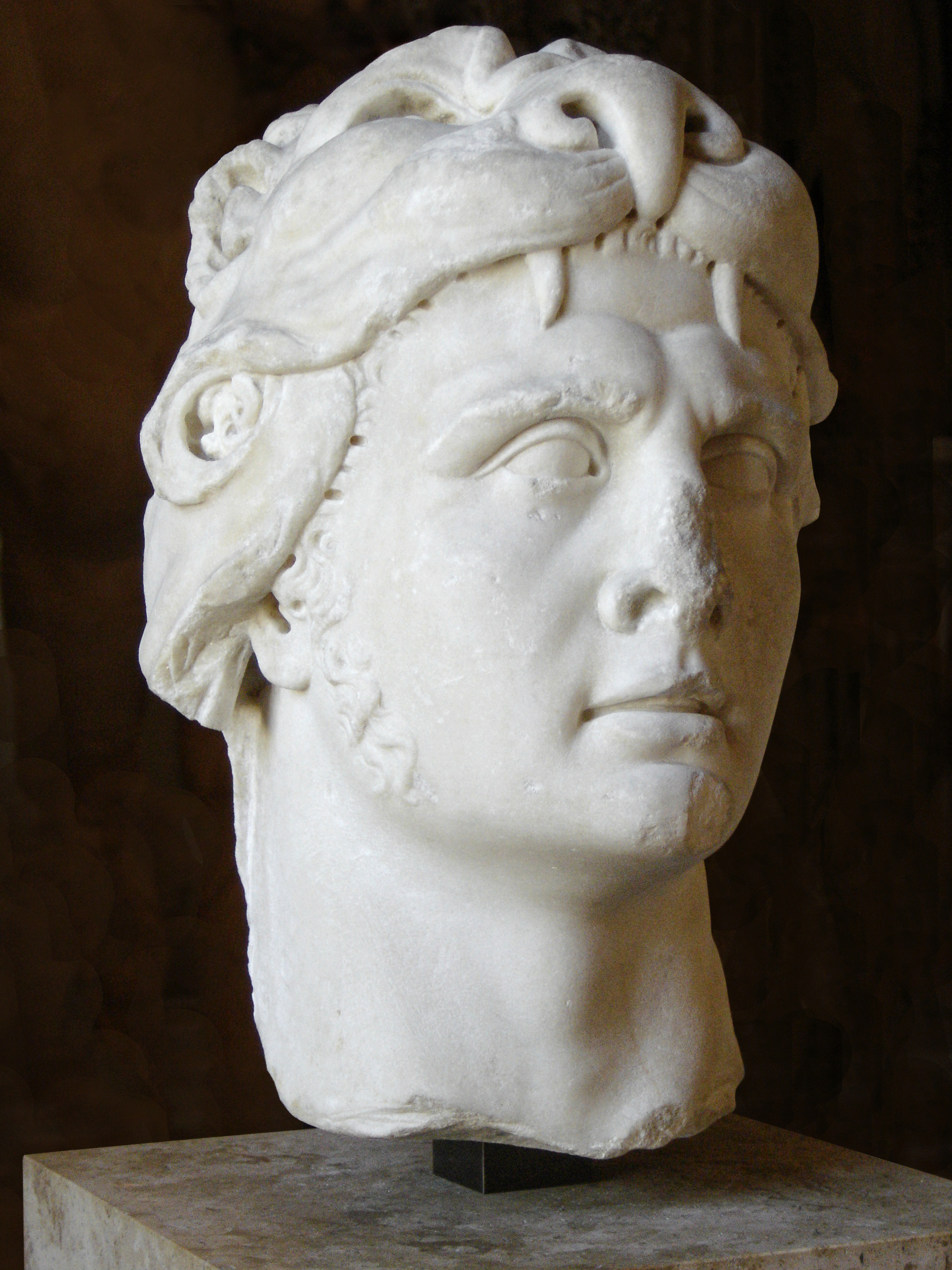
Mithridates VI of Pontus

- Mago (344 BC), Carthaginian admiral and general
- Megabocchus (53 BC), Roman cavalryman and friend of Publius Licinius Crassus
- Meng Tian (210 BC), Chinese general, administrator and inventor
- Lucius Cornelius Merula (87 BC), Roman politician, consul and high priest, cut his veins
- Mithridates VI Eupator (63 BC), King of Pontus, ordered an officer to stab him
- Molon (220 BC), Seleucid satrap of Media

=== O ===
- Othryades (546 BC), Spartan hoplite, sole survivor of the Battle of the 300 Champions

=== P ===
- Pantites (c. 470s BC), Spartan warrior and one of the 300 Spartans sent to the Battle of Thermopylae, hanging
- Marcus Petreius (46 BC), Roman politician and general, double-suicide by sword with Juba I of Numidia
- Phasael (40 BC), prince from the Herodian dynasty of Judea and governor of Jerusalem, hit his head against a great stone
- Phila (287 BC), Macedonian noblewoman, daughter and adviser of Antipater, poison
- Philistus (356 BC), Greek historian and naval commander
- Porcia (42 BC), Roman noblewoman, wife of Marcus Junius Brutus, swallowing burning coal or carbon monoxide poisoning
- Ptolemy (309 BC), Macedonian general, hemlock poisoning
- Ptolemy of Cyprus (58 BC), King of Cyprus and member of the Ptolemaic dynasty, poison

=== Q ===
- Qu Yuan (278 BC), Chinese poet and minister, drowning

=== S ===
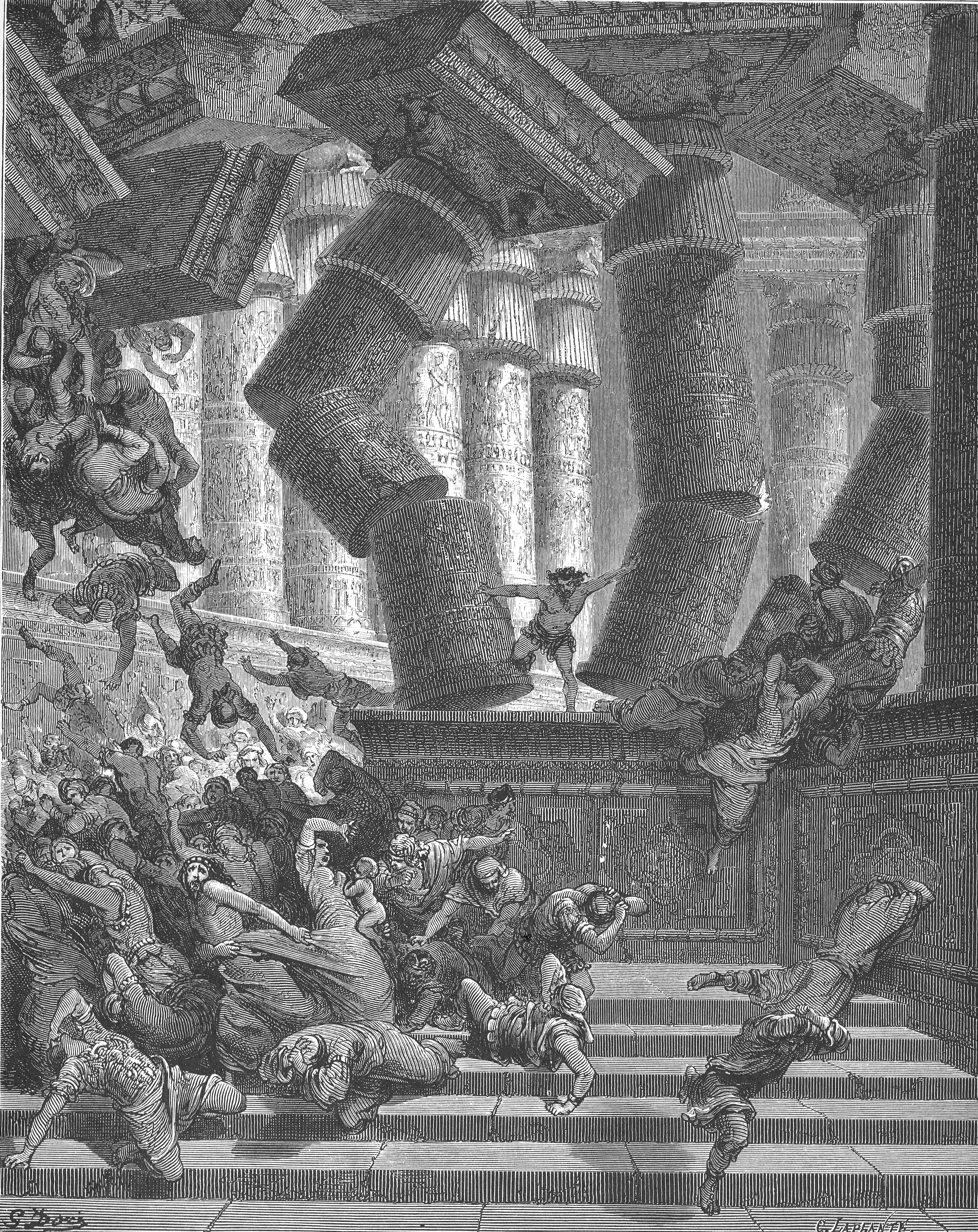
Samson's destruction of the temple in Judges 16:30

- Samson, according to Judges 16:30 in the Hebrew Bible, Samson killed himself and 3000 Philistines by collapsing the temple in Gaza City. Described by some sources as the first suicide attack.
- King Saul (1012 BC), Jewish king, pierced himself with his sword, to avoid being captured or killed by the Philistines, which some Rabbis claim does not count as suicide.
- Sappho (c. 570 BC), an ancient Greek poet from Lesbos, jumped off the cliff at Leucas over unrequited love for Phaon
- Metellus Scipio (46 BC), Roman consul and military commander, stabbed himself
- Servilia (30 BC), Roman noblewoman and wife of Marcus Aemilius Lepidus Minor, swallowed burning coal
- Shamash-shum-ukin (648 BC), King of Babylon, self-immolation
- Sophonisba (after 203 BC), Carthaginian noblewoman, swallowing poison

=== V ===
- Titus Vettius (104 BC), Roman equestrian and leader of a slave revolt

=== W ===
- Wu Zixu (484 BC), Chinese general and politician of the Wu, stabbed himself with a sword

=== X ===
- Xiang Yu (202 BC), Chinese rebel leader and king of Western Chu, slit his own throat

=== Z ===
- Zhang Han (205 BC), Chinese general
- Zhou of Shang (1046 BC), Chinese king of the Shang dynasty, set fire to himself and his palace

== Possible or disputed ==
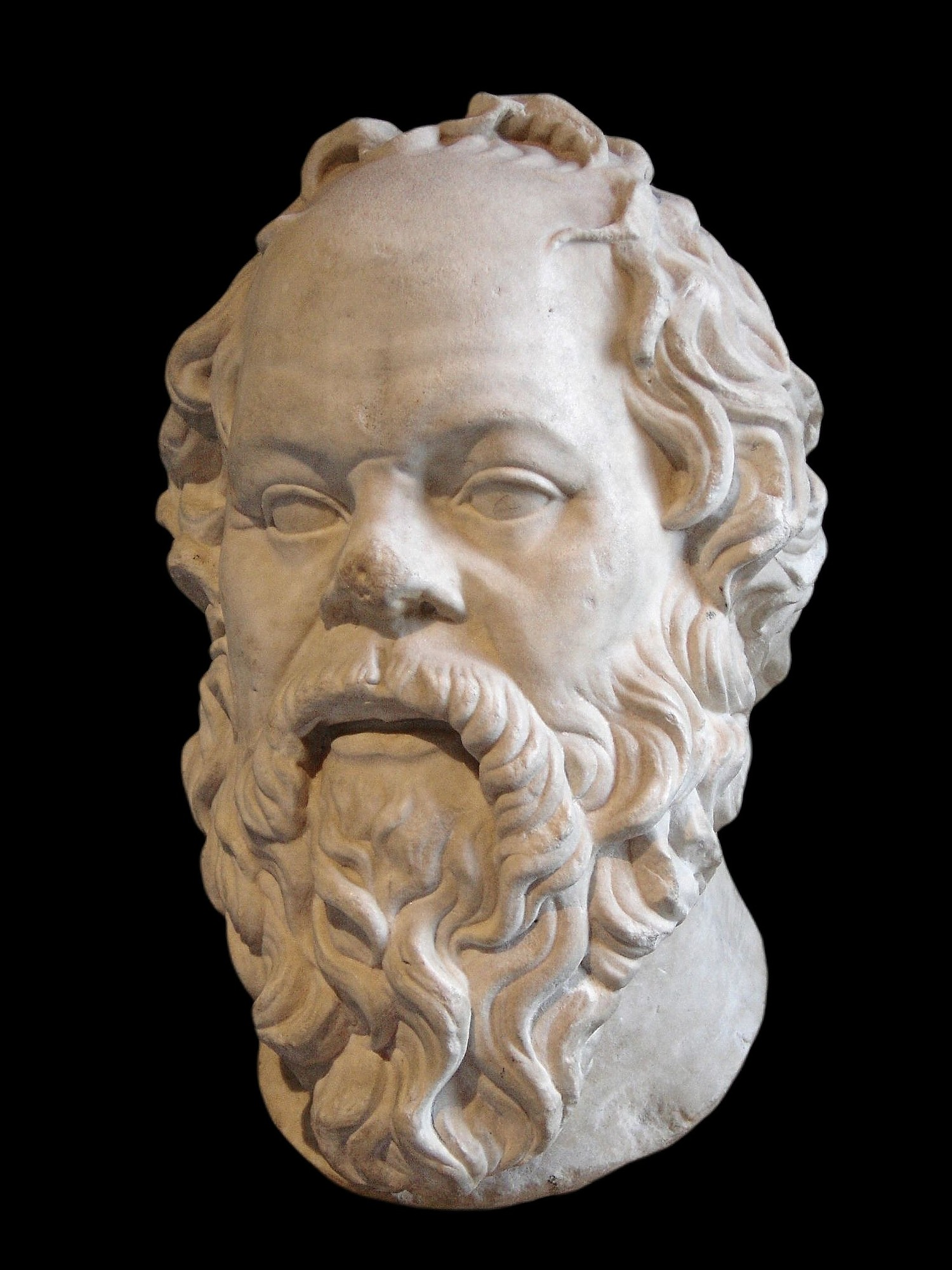
Socrates

- Hannibal (183–181 BC), Carthaginian military commander and tactician, possibly poison
- Lucretius (c. 55 BC), Roman poet and Epicurean philosopher. The only source of his suicide is Jerome, who is considered by scholars as unreliable and hostile towards Lucretius
- Orgetorix (60 BC), Gallic member of the ruling class of the Helvetii and conspirator. It is uncertain if he died by suicide or was executed.
- Socrates (399 BC), Classical Greek Athenian philosopher, credited as one of the founders of Western philosophy, poison (likely hemlock) Because Socrates was forced to poison himself to death as his sentence following his conviction for impiety and corrupting the minds of the youth of Athens, the question of whether this constitutes a genuine suicide is a subject of debate.

== See also ==
- List of suicides
- List of suicides (1–999 AD)
- List of suicides (1000–1899)
- List of suicides (1900–1999)
- List of suicides (2000–present)
