= List of suicides (1000–1899) =

The following notable people have died by suicide. This includes suicides effected under duress and excludes deaths by accident or misadventure. People who may or may not have died by their own hand, whose intent to die is disputed, or who are alleged to have been killed, may be listed.

== Confirmed ==
=== A ===
- Manuel Acuña (1873), Mexican poet, ingestion of potassium cyanide
- George Washington Adams (1829), American politician, lawyer, and eldest son of John Quincy Adams, drowning in Long Island Sound
- Marian Hooper Adams (1885), American socialite and photographer, potassium cyanide
- Francis William Lauderdale Adams (1893), English writer and poet, shot in head
- Aizong of Jin (1234), Chinese emperor of the Jin dynasty
- Leandro Alem (1896), Argentine politician, founder of the Radical Civic Union, gunshot to the head
- Henry Alexander (1894), American painter, swallowing oxalic acid
- Adna Anderson (1889), General, US Military Railroads during the American Civil War, railroad civil engineer/manager, gunshot
- Ottilie Assing (1884), German writer, journalist, feminist and abolitionist, swallowing potassium cyanide

=== B ===
- José Manuel Balmaceda (1891), President of Chile, gunshot
- Herculine Barbin (1868), French intersex memoirist, gas.
- Georges Ernest Boulanger (1891), French general and politician, gunshot
- May Brookyn (1894), British stage actress, overdose of carbolic acid
- Eustace Budgell (1737), English writer and politician, drowning in the Thames

=== C ===
- Justina Casagli (1841), Swedish opera singer, jumped out a window
- Camilo Castelo Branco (1890), Portuguese novelist, gunshot to the head
- Thomas Chatterton (1770), English poet and forger, arsenic poisoning
- Chen Wenlong (1277), Chinese politician, bureaucrat and general, starvation
- Chimalpopoca (1428), Emperor of Tenochtitlan, hanging
- Chongzhen (1644), Chinese emperor of the Ming dynasty
- Henri Christophe (1820), Haitian revolutionary and King of Haiti, gunshot to the heart
- Jeremiah Clarke (1707), English baroque composer and organist, gunshot

=== D ===
- Andrea Dandolo (1298), Venetian admiral, beating his head repeatedly against his flagship's mast
- Peter Delmé (1770), English politician, gunshot
- Ding Ruchang (1895), Chinese admiral, opium overdose
- Francis Douglas, Viscount Drumlanrig (1894), British nobleman and Liberal politician, gunshot

=== F ===
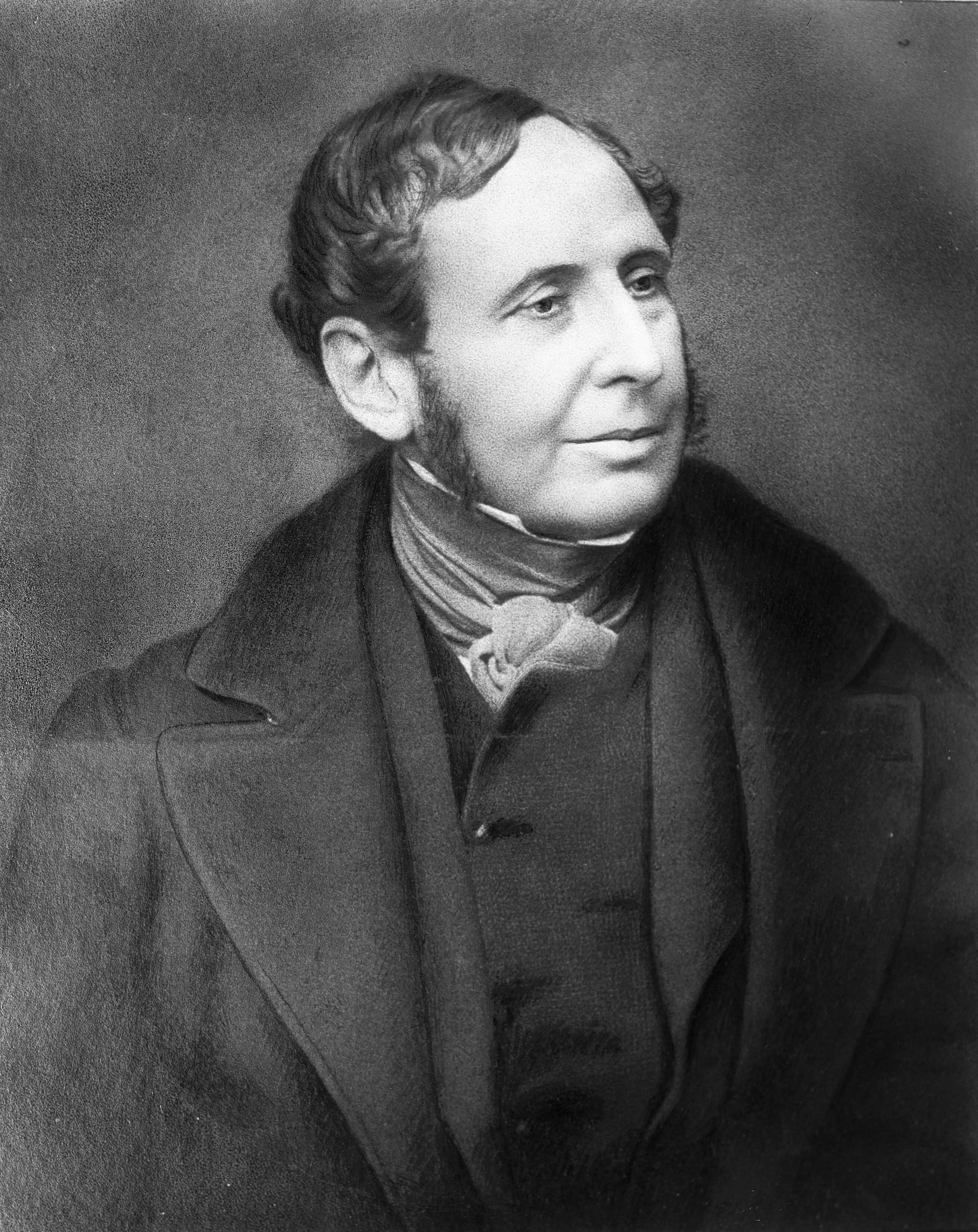
Robert FitzRoy

- Enevold De Falsen (1808), Justice of the Supreme Court of Norway, drowning
- Robert FitzRoy (1865), English meteorologist, surveyor, hydrographer, Governor of New Zealand and captain of HMS Beagle during Charles Darwin's second voyage of HMS Beagle, slit throat.
- Charles Ford (1884), American outlaw, gunshot.
- Bernhard Förster (1889), German colonist, teacher, writer and antisemitic activist, husband of Elisabeth Förster-Nietzsche, poison.
- Beşir Fuad (1887), Ottoman intellectual, cutting his wrists.

=== G ===
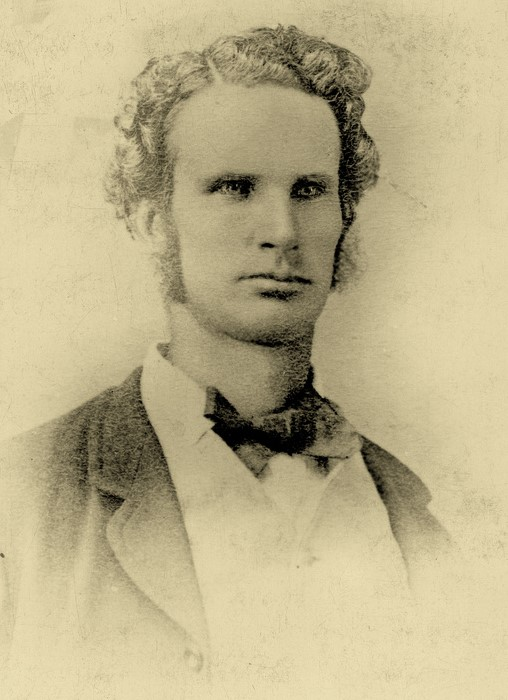
Adam Lindsay Gordon

- Adam Lindsay Gordon (1870), Australian poet, gunshot
- Theodor Grotthuss (1822), German chemist

=== H ===
- James Harden-Hickey (1898), Franco-American author, newspaper editor, duellist, adventurer and self-proclaimed Prince of Trinidad, overdose of morphine
- Brita Horn (1791), Swedish countess and courtier, drowning

=== I ===
- Imai Kanehira (1184), Japanese general, jump from his horse onto a sword he placed in his mouth
- Isokelekel (17th century), semi-mythical conqueror of Pohnpei Island in the Carolines and father of the cultural system of modern Pohnpei, bled to death after severing penis

=== J ===
- Rahmah ibn Jabir al-Jalhami (1826), Arab tribal leader, pirate captain and admiral, blew himself up with his ship and crew
- Karl Wilhelm Jerusalem (1772), German lawyer and philosopher, whose suicide was the major inspiration for Johann Wolfgang von Goethe's The Sorrows of Young Werther, gunshot

=== K ===
- Heinrich von Kleist (1811), German author, poet and journalist, gunshot
- Kuyili (1780), Indian freedom fighter, self-immolation

=== L ===
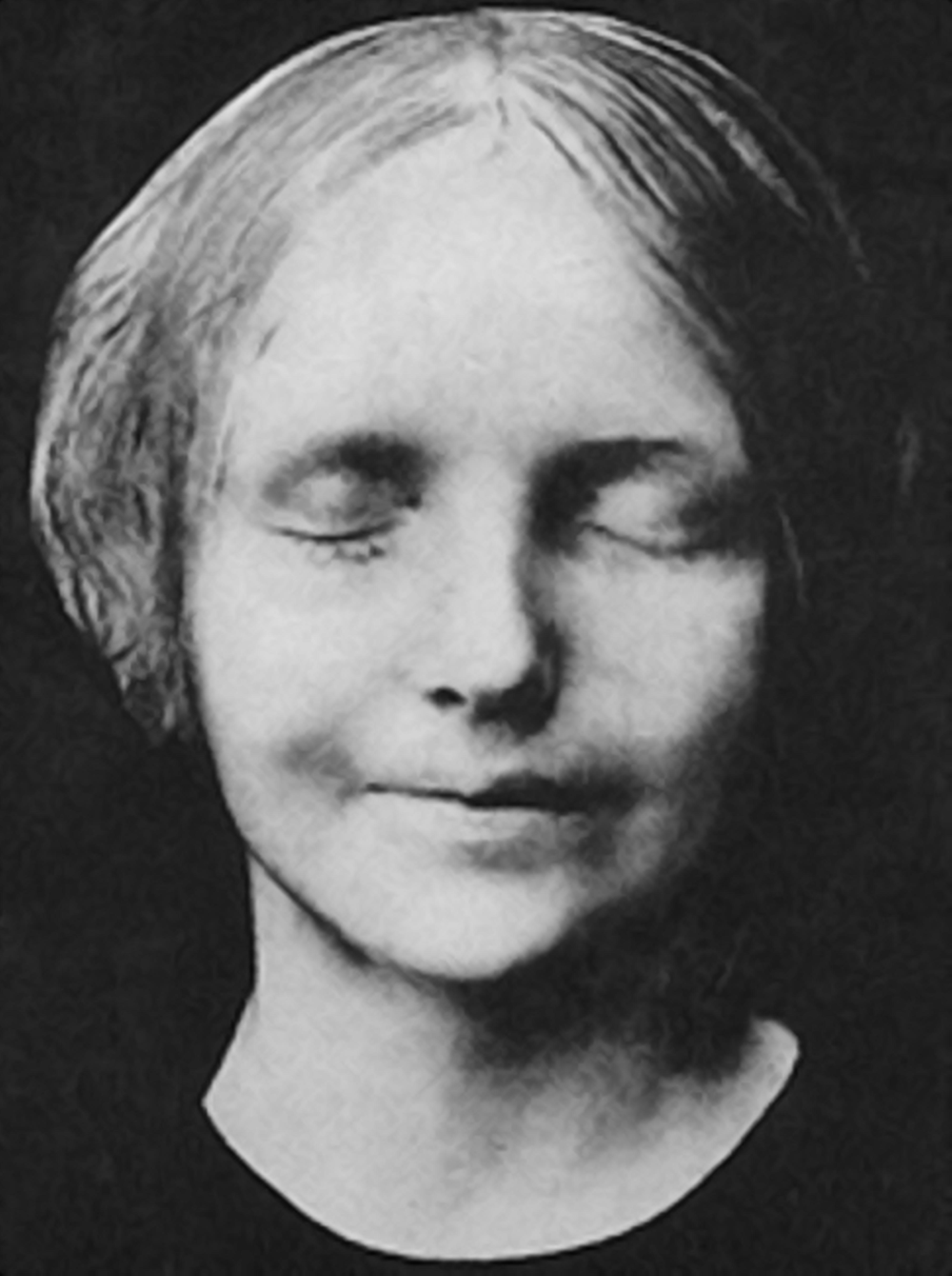
L'Inconnue de la Seine

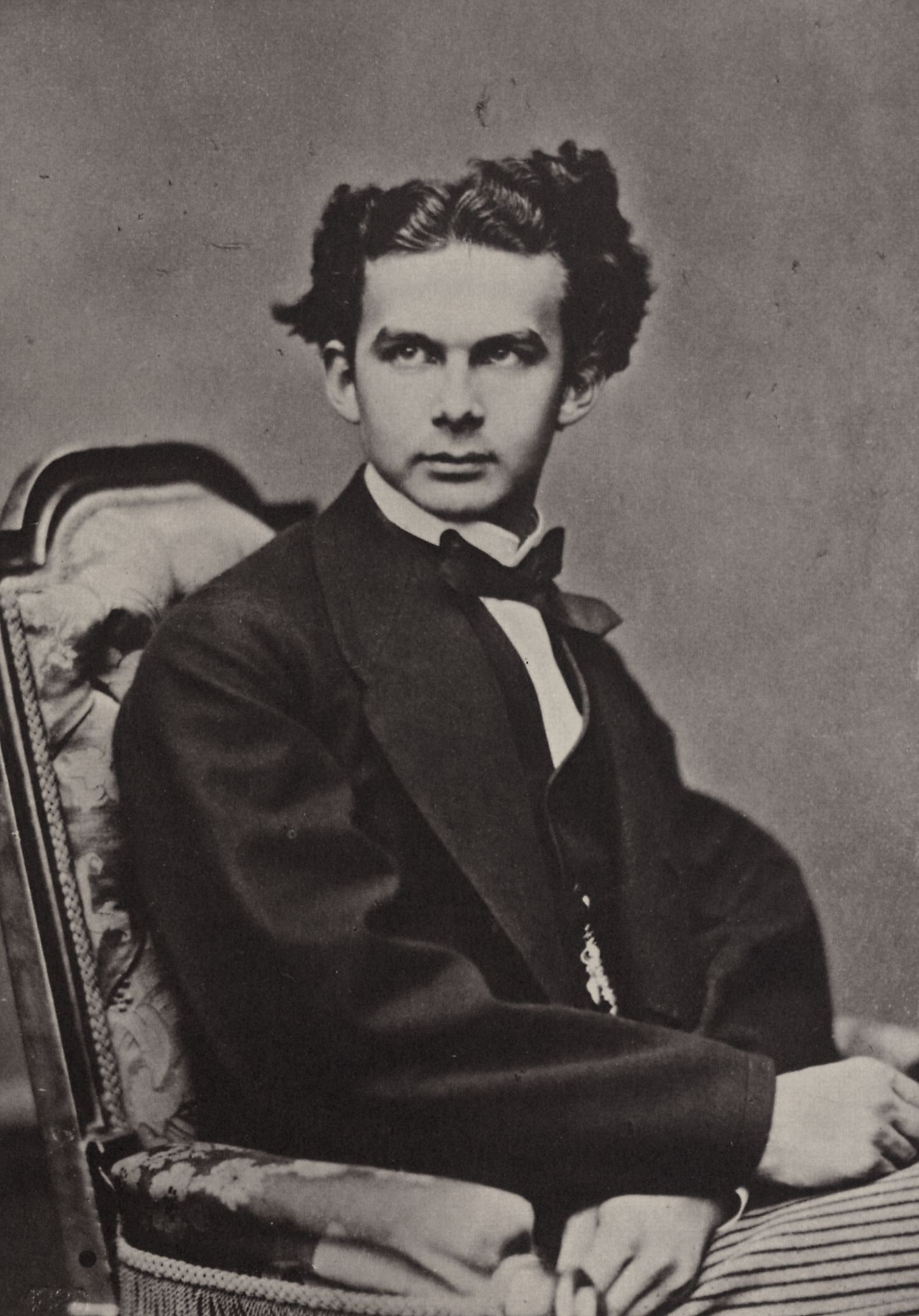
Ludwig II of Bavaria

- L'Inconnue de la Seine (late 1880s), unidentified French woman pulled out of the Seine, known for the influence of her death mask on literature and art
- Jim Lane (1866), American partisan, abolitionist, senator and Union general, gunshot to the head
- William Larnach (1898), New Zealand politician
- Mariano José de Larra (1837), Spanish writer, gunshot
- Amy Levy (1889), British writer inhaling charcoal gas
- Liu Rushi (1664), Chinese Gējì, poet, artist and Ming loyalist, hanging
- Willie Llewelyn (1893), Welsh cricketer, gunshot
- Lu Xiufu (1279), Chinese statesman, bureaucrat and general, murder-suicide by drowning Zhao Song and himself
- Ludwig II of Bavaria (1886), King of Bavaria, drowning

=== M ===
- Philipp Mainländer (1876), German poet and philosopher, hanging
- Eleanor Marx (1898), socialist activist and younger daughter of Karl Marx, poison
- Minamoto no Yorimasa (1180), Japanese poet, general and politician, ritual seppuku disembowelment
- Mingsioi (1866), Chinese general, explosion
- Chief Mkwawa (1898), Hehe tribal leader, gunshot to the head
- Antonin Moine (1849), French sculptor, gunshot

=== N ===
- Karl Nobiling (1878), German academic, who made an assassination attempt on the German Emperor Wilhelm I, gunshot to the head

=== O ===
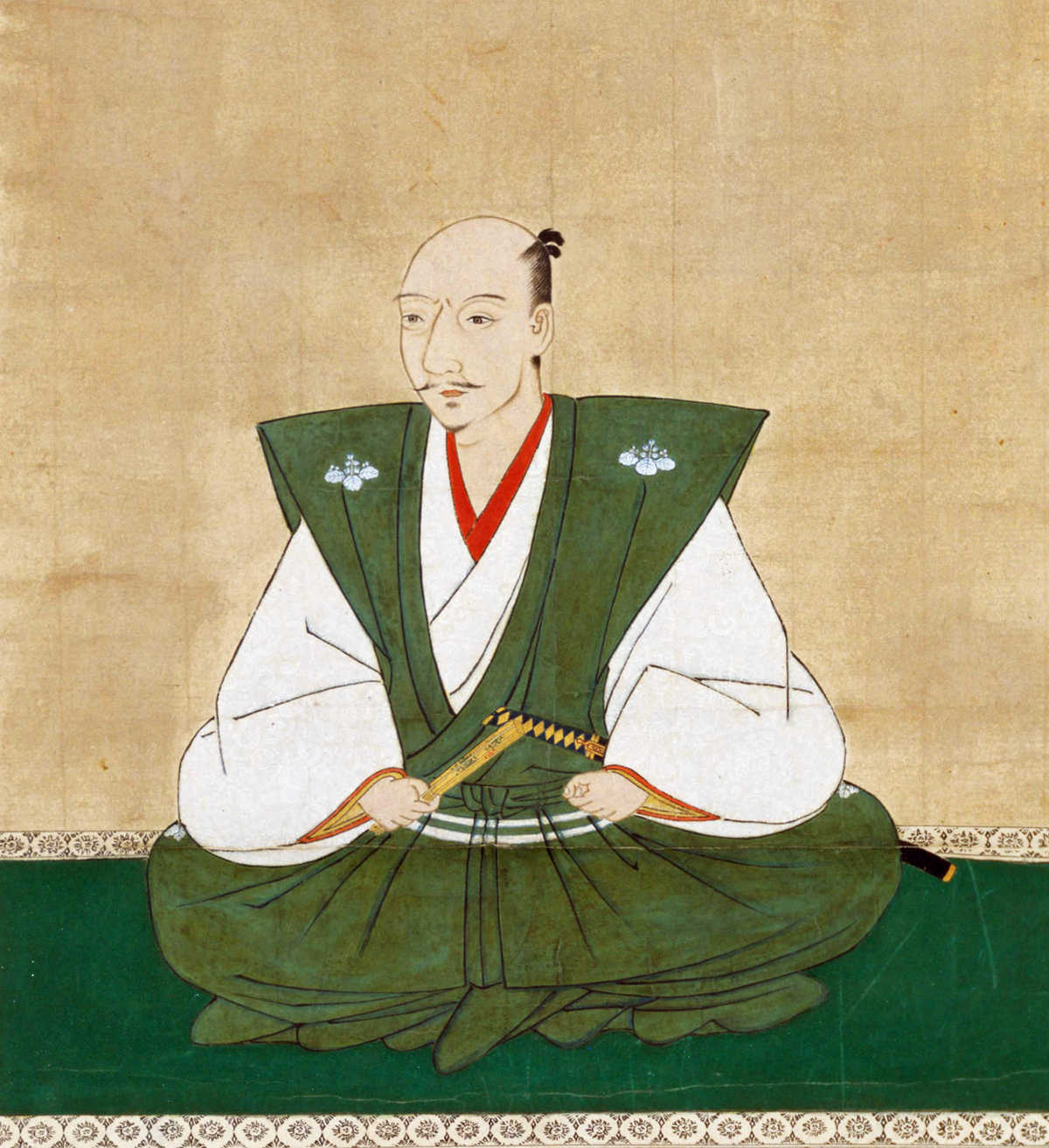
Oda Nobunaga

- Oda Nobunaga (1582), Japanese daimyō and general, ritual seppuku disembowelment
- Ōuchi Yoshitaka (1551), Japanese daimyō and general, ritual seppuku disembowelment

=== P ===
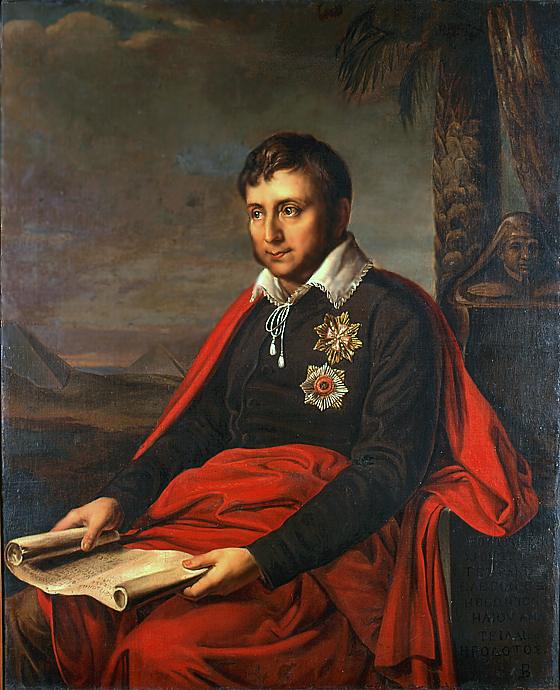
Jan Potocki

- Oscar G. Peters (1894), American businessman
- Jan Potocki (1815), Polish nobleman, gunshot
- Lucien-Anatole Prévost-Paradol (1870), French journalist, writer and Ambassador to the United States, gunshot

=== R ===
- Thomas C. Reynolds (1887), Confederate governor of Missouri, jump from the third floor into the freight elevator shaft of the Custom House in St. Louis
- Rikyū (1591), Japanese tea master and confidant of Toyotomi Hideyoshi, ritual seppuku disembowelment
- Rudolf, Crown Prince of Austria (1889), son of Emperor Franz Joseph I, gunshot during the Mayerling incident
- Edmund Ruffin (1865), American author, agriculturalist, agronomist and secessionist, gunshot to the head
- Thomas Jefferson Rusk (1857), American politician and military leader, gunshot

=== S ===
- Saigō Takamori (1877), Japanese samurai, nobleman and general, seppuku.
- Satanta (1878), Kiowa war chief, jump out a window
- Shah Begum (1604), first wife of Emperor Jahangir, opium overdose
- Someshvara I (1068), King of Western Chalukya, drowning in the Tungabhadra River
- Adalbert Stifter (1868), Austrian writer, cut neck with a razor
- Pringle Stokes (1828), British naval officer and captain of HMS Beagle during her first voyage, gunshot
- Sue Harukata (1555), daimyo of Ouchi clan, disembowelment

=== T ===
- Taira no Tokiko (1185), Japanese Buddhist nun, wife of the chief of the Taira, grandmother of Emperor Antoku, drowning
- Taira no Tomomori (1185), Japanese general, admiral and heir apparent of the Taira, drowning
- Jacque Alexander Tardy (1827), Scottish-French pirate, slit his own throat
- Octave Tassaert (1874), French painter, charcoal-burning
- Tewodros II (1868), Emperor of Ethiopia, gunshot
- Tezozomoctli (1430), Emperor of Cuautitlán, poison
- Samuel J. F. Thayer (1893), American architect, gunshot
- William Thornton (1840), British lieutenant-general
- Tolui (1232), Mongol prince, general and regent, sacrificed himself in a shamanistic ritual

=== V ===
- Pierre-Charles Villeneuve (1806), French admiral, stabbing

=== W ===
- Horace Wells (1848), American dentist and pioneer of anaesthesiology, slitting his left femoral artery with a razor
- Tom Wills (1880), Australian cricketer and pioneer of Australian rules football, stabbed himself in the heart with a pair of scissors

=== Y ===
- Yakushiji Motoichi (1504), Japanese samurai and deputy governor, ritual seppuku disembowelment

=== Z ===
- Zhang Shicheng (1367), Chinese warlord, leading figure during the Red Turban Rebellion and self-proclaimed king of Great Zhou, hanging
- Zhang Shijie (1279), Chinese admiral, general, bureaucrat and politician, drowning

== Possible or disputed ==
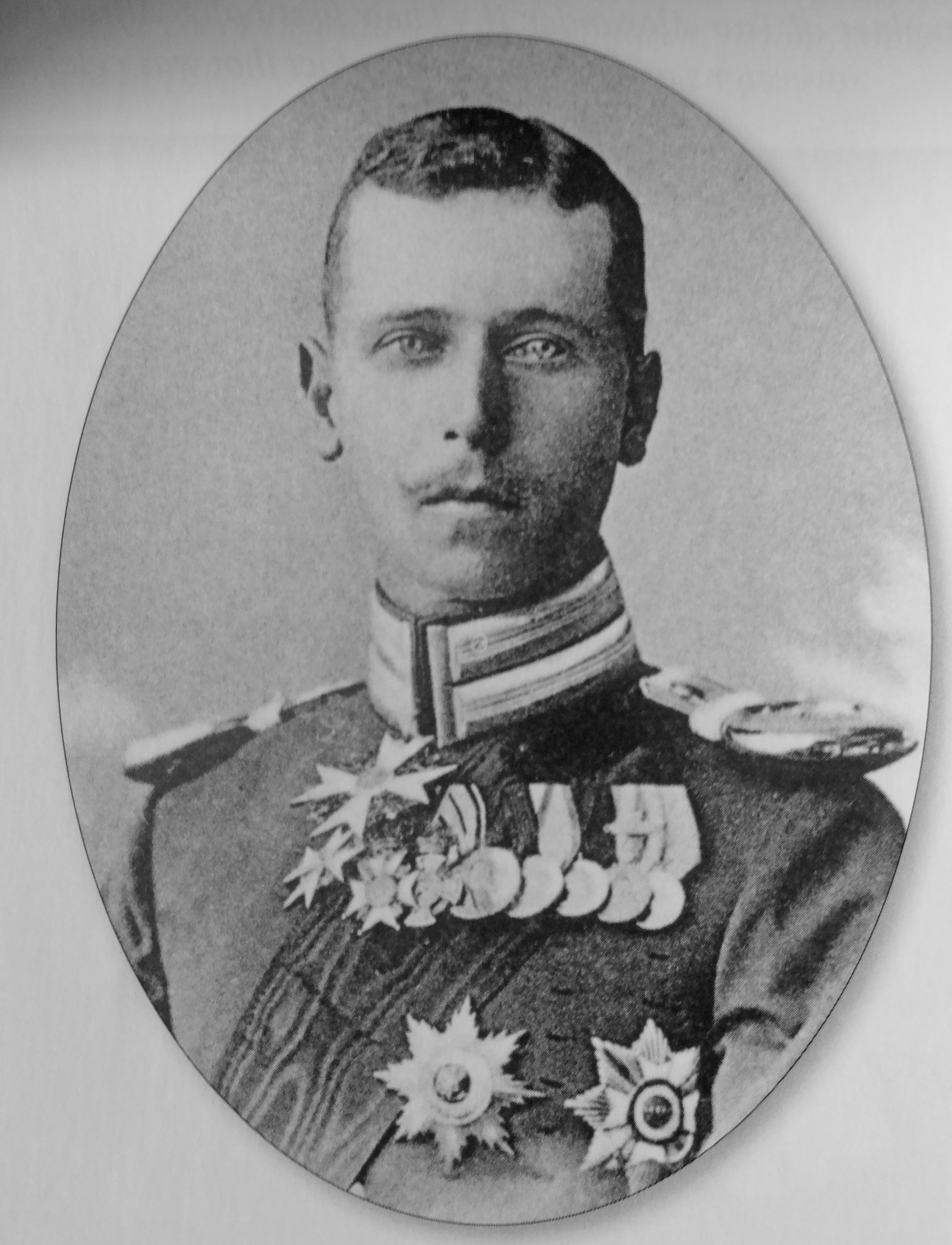
Alfred, Hereditary Prince of Saxe-Coburg and Gotha

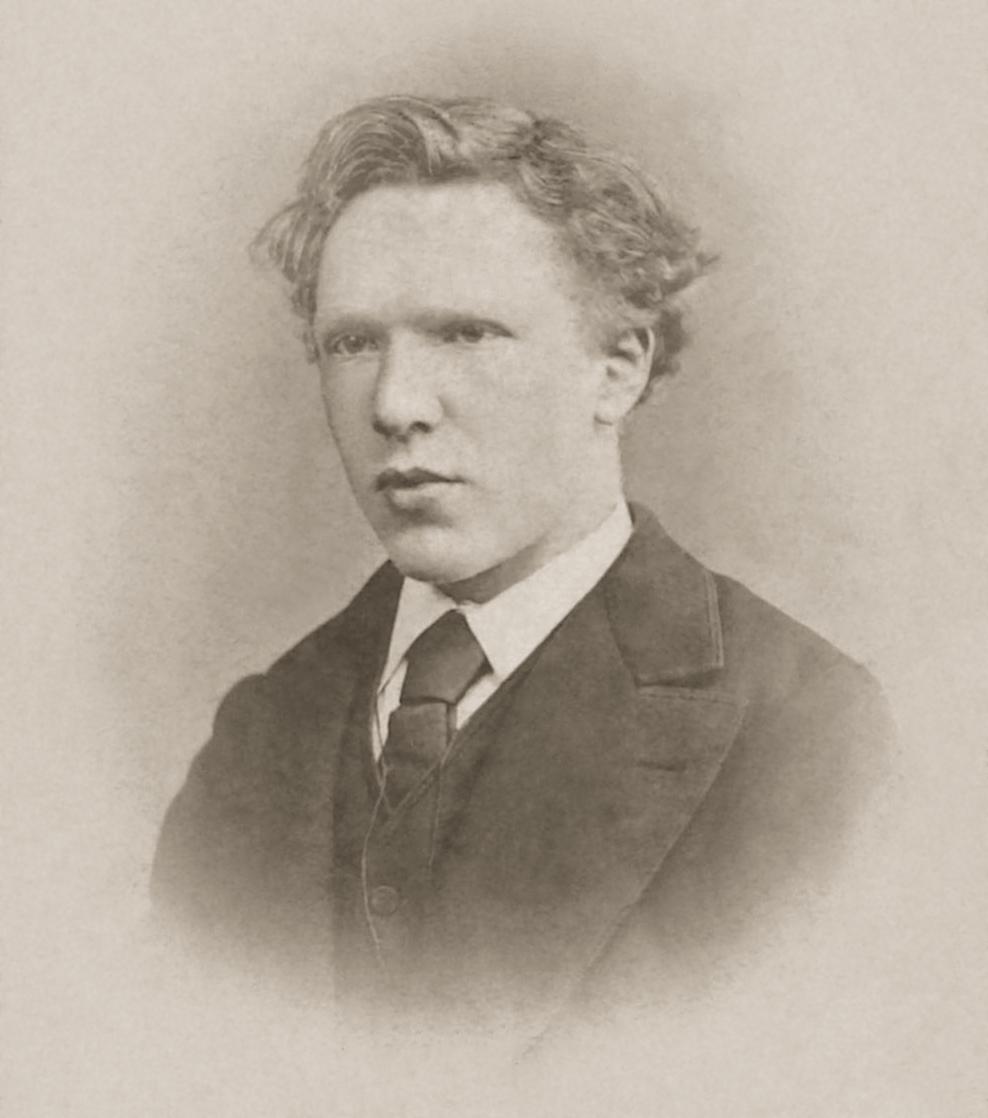
Vincent van Gogh

- Simon Affleck (1725), Swedish tax collector, gunshot. While Affleck died in 1725, it is uncertain whether he shot himself.
- Prince Alfred of Edinburgh (1899), member of the British royal family. The exact circumstances of Alfred's death are unknown, and varying accounts have been published. His sister Marie's memoirs simply say his health "broke down", and other writers have said that he had "consumption". The Times published an account stating he had died of a tumor, while The Complete Peerage gives the generally accepted account that he "shot himself".
- John Fitch (1798), American inventor, opium overdose
- Jules Lequier (1862), French philosopher, likely swam voluntarily out into the ocean
- Meriwether Lewis (1809), US explorer and partner of William Clark, gunshot. There is some debate as to whether his death was a suicide.
- John William Polidori (1821), English writer and physician, ingestion of hydrogen cyanide. The coroner gave a verdict of death by natural causes despite strong evidence of suicide.
- John Hanning Speke (1864), British explorer, gunshot. An inquest concluded that his death was accidental, a conclusion supported by Speke's biographer Alexander Maitland, as the location of the fatal wound just below Speke's armpit made suicide unlikely. However, the idea of suicide has appealed to some critics of Speke.
- Vincent van Gogh (1890), Dutch Post-Impressionist painter, gunshot to the chest. Naifeh and Smith 2011 biography of van Gogh argued that he was a possible victim of accidental manslaughter or foul play by René Secrétan, who led a gang of teenage hooligans who enjoyed getting drunk and bullying the tortured artist.

== See also ==
- List of suicides
- List of suicides (BC)
- List of suicides (1–999 AD)
- List of suicides (1900–1999)
- List of suicides (2000–present)
- List of deaths from drug overdose and intoxication
