= Pantites =

Spartan warrior (died 470s BC)

- Native name: Παντίτης
- Died: c. 475 BC
- Allegiance: Sparta
- Service years: 480 BC
- Conflicts: Second Persian invasion of Greece Battle of Thermopylae

Pantites (Ancient Greek: Παντίτης; died c. 470s BC) was a Spartan warrior, one of the Three Hundred sent to the Battle of Thermopylae. King Leonidas I ordered Pantites on an embassy to Thessaly, possibly to recruit allies for the coming battle. However, Pantites failed to return to Thermopylae in time for the battle, arriving after all of his fellow soldiers had been killed. When he returned to Sparta, he was shunned as a "trembler" and made an outcast. Unable to live with his disgrace, he hanged himself.

== See also ==
- Eurytus of Sparta
- Aristodemus of Sparta
