= List of suicides =

The following lists include people who have died by suicide. This includes suicides effected under duress and excludes deaths by accident or misadventure. People who may or may not have died by their own hand, whose intent to die is disputed, or who are alleged to have been killed, are included in some of these lists.

== Lists by time period ==
- List of suicides (BC)
- List of suicides (1–999 AD)
- List of suicides (1000–1899)
- List of suicides (1900–1999)
- List of suicides (2000–present)

== Other lists ==
- List of deaths from legal euthanasia and assisted suicide
- List of suicides attributed to bullying
- List of livestreamed suicides
- List of political self-immolations
- List of deaths from drug overdose and intoxication
- Lists of people by cause of death
- Category:Suicides by method
