= List of suicides (1–999 AD) =

The following notable people have died by suicide. This includes suicides effected under duress and excludes deaths by accident or misadventure. People who may or may not have died by their own hand, whose intent to die is disputed, or who are alleged to have been killed, may be listed.

== Confirmed ==
=== A ===
- Vibulenus Agrippa (36 AD), Roman equestrian, poison
- Andragathius (388 AD), Roman general and Magister equitum who assassinated emperor Gratian, drowned in the sea
- Publius Anteius Rufus (67 AD), Roman politician, drank poison and cut his veins
- Marcus Gavius Apicius (before 40 AD), Roman socialite, gourmet and man of great wealth, poison
- Arbogast (394 AD), Roman general
- Arria (42 AD), Roman wife of Caecina Paetus an alleged conspirator against Emperor Claudius, stabbed herself

=== B ===
- Junius Blaesus (31 AD), Roman consul, general and governor of Africa, fell on a sword
- Bonosus (280 AD), Roman usurper, hanging
- Boudica (61 AD), Queen of the Iceni, poison

=== C ===
- Cai Lun (121 AD), Chinese eunuch court official, imperial adviser, inventor of paper and the modern papermaking process, poison
- Lucius Arruntius Camillus Scribonianus (42 AD), Roman politician, consul and rebel against Emperor Claudius

=== D ===
- Decebalus (106 AD), King of Dacia
- Decentius (353 AD), Roman usurper
- Demonax (c. 170 AD), Greek Cypriot Cynic philosopher, starved himself to death
- Julia Domna (217 AD), Roman empress, second wife of Emperor Septimius Severus

=== E ===
- Epicharis (65 AD), Roman leading member of the Pisonian conspiracy, strangled herself with a band of cloth
- Ermanaric (376 AD), king of the Greuthungi
- Euphrates the Stoic (118 AD), Roman Stoic philosopher, hemlock poisoning

=== G ===
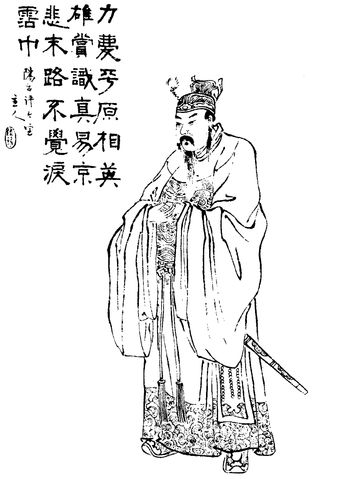
Gongsun Zan

- Gildo (398 AD), Roman Berber general and rebel leader, hanging
- Gongsun Zan (199 AD), Chinese general and warlord, setting himself and his family on fire
- Gordian I (238 AD), Roman emperor, hanging

=== I ===
- Silius Italicus (c. 103 AD), Roman consul, orator, author and poet, starvation

=== J ===
- Ji Yan (224 AD), Chinese official of the state of Eastern Wu, bureaucrat and reformer
- Empress Jingyin (82 AD), Chinese imperial consort for Emperor Zhang of Han also known as Consort Song

=== L ===
- Titus Labienus (8 AD), Roman lawyer, orator and historian
- Lu Zhaolin (684 or 686 AD), Chinese poet, drowning in the Ying River
- Lucan (65 AD), Roman poet, cut veins

=== M ===
- Naevius Sutorius Macro (38 AD), Roman prefect of the Praetorian Guard
- Magnentius (353 AD), Roman usurper
- Titus Clodius Eprius Marcellus (79 AD), Roman consul and senator, slit his throat with a razor
- Maximian (310 AD), Roman emperor

=== N ===
- Nero (68 AD), Roman emperor, ordered his secretary to kill him
- Marcus Cocceius Nerva (33 AD), Roman jurist, official and confidant of Tiberius, starvation

=== O ===
- Otho (69 AD), Roman Emperor, stabbed himself

=== P ===
- Caecina Paetus (42 AD), Roman alleged conspirator against Emperor Claudius, stabbed himself
- Peregrinus Proteus (165 AD), Greek early Christian convert and later Cynic philosopher from Mysia, immolated himself on a funeral pyre during the Olympic Games
- Petronius (66 AD), Roman senator, consul, courtier and novelist, opening his veins
- Gaius Calpurnius Piso (65 AD), Roman senator, orator, advocate and leading member of the Pisonian conspiracy, slit his wrists
- Gnaeus Calpurnius Piso (20 AD), Roman statesman and consul, cut his throat
- Polemon of Laodicea (144 AD), Roman sophist, rhetorician and strategos, locked himself in his family tomb
- Gnaeus Pompeius Longinus (105 AD), Roman senator and general, swallowing poison
- Poenius Postumus (61 AD), Roman praefectus castrorum of the Legion II Augusta, fell upon his sword

=== Q ===
- Quintillus (270 AD), Roman emperor, opening his veins

=== R ===
- Quintus Corellius Rufus (before 113 AD), Roman senator, consul, confidant and teacher of Pliny the Younger, refusing food and treatment for his illnesses

=== S ===
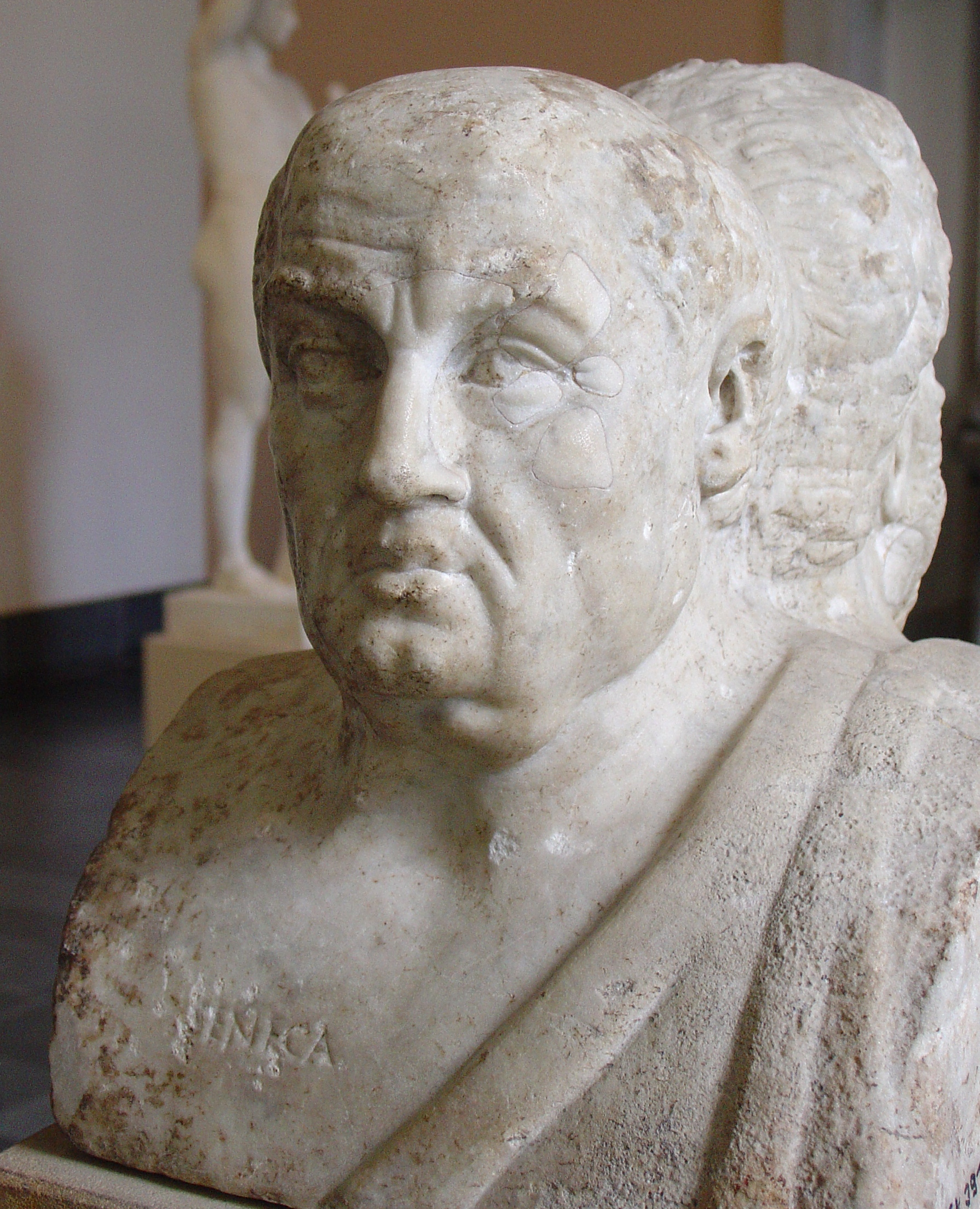
Seneca the Younger

- Marcus Ostorius Scapula (65 AD), Roman senator, consul and military tribune, severed his veins and stabbed himself with help from a slave
- Mamercus Aemilius Scaurus (34 AD), Roman rhetorician, poet, senator and consul
- Seneca the Younger (65 AD), Roman philosopher, cut his veins
- Marcus Sedatius Severianus (161 or 162 AD), Roman senator, consul and general, starved himself
- Mamercus Aemilius Scaurus (34 AD), Roman senator, followed by his wife Sextia
- Barea Soranus (66 AD), Roman consul, senator and governor of Asia
- Sporus (69 AD), Roman boy whom the emperor Nero had castrated and married, stabbed his throat with a dagger

=== T ===
- Ofonius Tigellinus (69 AD), Roman prefect of the Praetorian Guard, cut his throat with a razor

=== V ===
- Publius Quinctilius Varus (9 AD), Roman general, fell upon his sword
- Marcus Julius Vestinus Atticus (65 AD), Roman senator and consul, opening his veins
- Lucius Antistius Vetus (65 AD), Roman senator, consul and governor of Germania Superior
- Lucius Annius Vinicianus (42 AD), Roman senator, plotter of the assassination of Caligula, rebel against Claudius

=== Z ===
- Ibn al-Zayyat (962 AD), Arab Abbasid governor of Tarsus, jumping from a high tower

== Possible or disputed ==
- Clodius Albinus (197 AD), Roman emperor, killed himself after a defeat in battle (possibly executed by Septimius Severus)
- Judas Iscariot (AD 30 or 33), Apostle turned betrayer of Jesus, hanged himself according to the Gospel of Matthew; the Book of Acts can be interpreted to suggest he died in an accidental fall, or that it is an addition to what the Gospel of Matthew said while the apocryphical Gospel of Judas suggests he was stoned to death by the other Apostles

== See also ==
- List of suicides
- List of suicides (BC)
- List of suicides (1000–1899)
- List of suicides (1900–1999)
- List of suicides (2000–present)
