= Lavinia Fisher =

American criminal

- Born: c. 1793; Charleston, South Carolina, U.S.
- Died: February 18, 1820 (aged 26–27); Old City Jail, Charleston, South Carolina, U.S.
- Cause of death: Execution by hanging
- Spouse: John Fisher
- Conviction: Highway robbery
- Penalty: Death

Details
- Country: United States
- State: South Carolina

Lavinia Fisher (c. 1793 – February 18, 1820) was an American criminal who, according to urban legends, was the first female serial killer in the United States of America. She was married to John Fisher, and both were convicted of highway robbery—a capital offense at the time—not murder.

Historians have begun to question the veracity of the traditional legend and some assert that Lavinia Fisher never killed anyone. She was, however, an active member of a large gang of highwaymen who operated out of two houses, the Five Mile House and the Six Mile House, in the backcountry near Charleston, South Carolina. It is not clear whether the Six Mile House was a hotel, but it served as a hideout for a number of outlaws.

== Residence ==
Fisher and her husband resided in Charleston, South Carolina, for most of their lives. Together, they owned an inn, the Six Mile Wayfarer House, which they managed in the early 19th century. The hotel was located six miles north of Charleston, hence the name. During the couple's time there, reports were made to the local sheriff about guests disappearing. Due to lack of evidence, and the popularity of the couple with many locals, these complaints came to nothing.

== Crimes ==
Lavinia Fisher would invite lone travelers into the Six Mile Wayfarer House to dinner and ask them questions about their occupations, trying to determine if they had money. She would send them up to their rooms with a cup of poisoned tea. Once the men drank their tea and went to bed, her husband went to the room to beat them almost to the point of death.

Another version of the legend was that the tea would only put the men to sleep for a few hours. Then, when they were almost asleep, Lavinia would pull a lever and the bed would collapse and drop the victim into a pit.

Much of what actually occurred in the alleged murders at the hands of John and Lavinia Fisher has become wildly exaggerated through time, so factual details are hard to find. However, contemporary news accounts in the Charleston Post and Courier claimed that a vigilante gang went to the Fishers' neighborhood in February 1819 to stop the purported 'gang activities' that were occurring there. Satisfied that they had accomplished their task, the group returned to Charleston, but left a young man by the name of David Ross to stand watch in the area.

Early the next day, Ross was attacked by two men and dragged before the gang that had terrorized the region. Among them was Lavinia Fisher, to whom he looked for help. However, rather than help him, she choked him and then smashed his head through a window. Ross managed to escape and immediately alerted authorities.

Immediately following this incident, another traveler named John Peeples asked if there were any vacancies; Lavinia replied that there was unfortunately no room, but he was welcome to come inside and rest and have some tea. John happened to hate tea, and not wanting to seem rude, he dumped it when she wasn't looking. She interrogated him for hours and eventually said she discovered that in fact, they did have a room. He then went to bed. He had felt suspicious about the interrogation and was worried about being robbed, so he decided to sleep in the wooden chair by the door. In the middle of the night, he awoke to the loud sound of the bed collapsing and discovered the Fishers' plan. He jumped out the window and rode to Charleston to alert the authorities.

Based on these two accounts, the assailants were finally identified by name, something that law enforcement had previously lacked. Police were immediately dispatched to the location and during the ensuing investigation Lavinia and John were located, along with two other gang members. John Fisher surrendered the group in an effort to protect his wife and shield her from possible gunfire. Later, during interrogation, he again attempted to protect Lavinia by giving the identities of all involved in the gang.

== Trial and execution ==
Nearly a full year elapsed between the time of their arrest and their execution. At their arraignment, the Fishers pleaded not guilty but were ordered to be held in jail until their trial, which would take place in May, while their co-conspirators were released on bail. At their trial, the jury rejected their pleas of innocence and found them guilty of highway robbery, a capital offense. However, the judge allowed an appeal and they were given a reprieve until the January session of the court.

During this time, the Fishers occupied themselves with plans to escape, as they were housed together at the Charleston, South Carolina jail (the "Old City Jail") in a 6x8 cell and not heavily guarded. On September 13, they put their plans into action and began their escape. Things did not go as planned, as the rope they had made from prison linens broke, leaving Lavinia trapped in the cell and John set free. He was unwilling to continue the escape plan and was recaptured. The two were then kept under much tighter security.

The Constitutional court rejected their appeals and on February 4, 1820, both were sentenced to be hanged. Awaiting execution, John accepted the counsel of the Reverend Richard Furman, a local minister, but Lavinia became even more vitriolic.

On the gallows in front of the Old City Jail before John Fisher's execution, Rev. Furman read aloud a letter John had composed, which stated that since he had become a Christian he could not be executed with a lie held to his account. Therefore, he insisted on his innocence and asked mercy on those who had done him wrong in the judicial process. After the minister read the letter, Fisher then began to plead his case before the gathered crowd of some 2,000. He then seemingly contradicted himself by asking for their forgiveness.

== The Supposed Haunting ==
Lavinia Fisher, controversially requesting to wear her wedding dress, left this world with a bone chilling statement during her execution at the Old Charleston Jail or "Old City Jail" as many refer to it as. She exclaimed, “If you have a message you want to send to hell, give it to me—I'll carry it,” setting the tone for the legend of the years later popularized haunting. As restoration efforts were put in place in 2000, strange occurrences began including reports of unusual apparition sightings, bizarre sounds as well as overpowering odors, footprints in the dust when the building was deemed abandoned, and even some insist their experiences turned physical. When Charleston opened the growing publicized jail for tours, more specifically ghosts tours, Fisher gained recognition as the most popular ghost to roam there. Tourists have made claims that they caught glimpses of a woman in a red and white wedding dress.

== Burial ==
Lavinia was buried in a potter's field near the Old City Jail. Claims of her burial at 150 Meeting Street (The Circular Congregational Church) or at 4 Archdale Street (The Unitarian Church) appear to have been fictions promoted by tour guides.

== See also ==
- List of serial killers in the United States
- Patty Cannon – American serial killer (c. 1759/1760–1829)
