= Aristodemus (died 479 BC) =

Spartan soldier

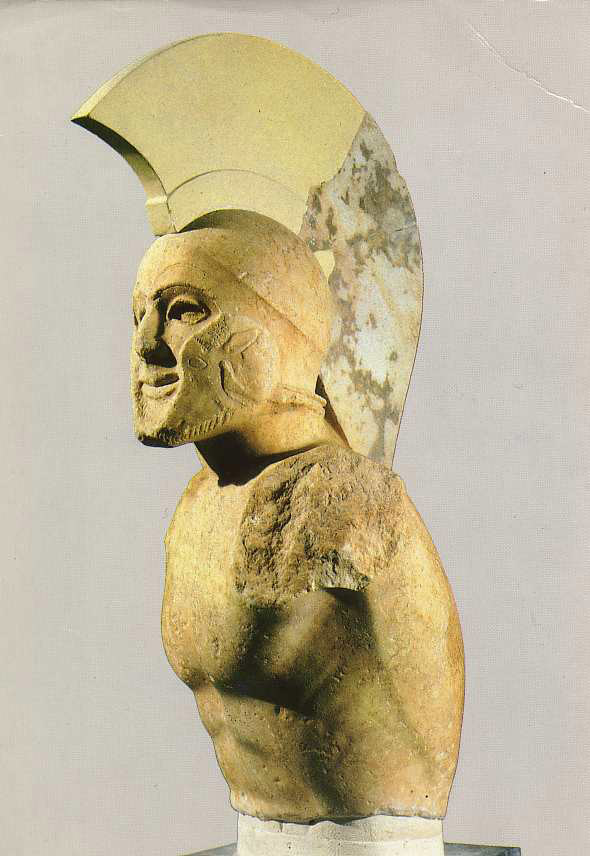
A Spartan soldier (hoplite)

Aristodemus (Greek: Ἀριστόδημος, died 479 BC) was a Spartan soldier who was one of the 300 Spartans sent to the Battle of Thermopylae.

== Thermopylae ==
Aristodemus was the only Spartan survivor, as he was not present at the last stand. Aristodemus and another soldier, Eurytus, were stricken with a disease of the eye, causing King Leonidas to order them to return home before the battle, but Eurytus turned back, though blind, and met his end charging into the fray.

The Greek historian Herodotus believed that had both Aristodemus and Eurytus returned alive, or had Aristodemus alone been ill and excused from combat, the Spartans would have ascribed no blame to Aristodemus. However, because Eurytus did turn back and died in combat, Aristodemus was regarded as a coward and subjected to humiliation and disgrace at the hands of his compatriots; in the words of Herodotus, "no man would give him a light for his fire or speak to him; he was called Aristodemus the Coward."

The other survivor of the Three Hundred was a man named Pantites, who had been sent by Leonidas on an embassy to Thessaly. He failed to return to Thermopylae in time for the battle, and on finding himself in disgrace in Sparta, hanged himself.

== Plataea ==
At the Battle of Plataea, Aristodemus fought with such fury that the Spartans regarded him as having redeemed himself. Although they removed the black mark against his name, they did not award him any special honours for his valour because he had fought with suicidal recklessness; the Spartans regarded true warriors as more valorous, who fought while still wishing to live. Aristodemus charged, berserker-like, out of the phalanx and fought, in the opinion of Herodotus, with the most bravery of all the Spartans before falling in battle.

== In popular culture ==
Aristodemos is the main figure in Caroline Snedeker's popular historical novel The Coward of Thermopylae (1911), retitled in 1912 as The Spartan.

Aristodemos appears as a recurring background character in Steven Pressfield's 1998 novel Gates of Fire. Four years before the battle of Thermopylae, he is part of an ultimately unsuccessful four-man envoy sent to Rhodes to dissuade the Rhodian navy from serving Xerxes. While at Rhodes the envoy encounters a group of Egyptian marines, led by a captain named Ptammitechus (whom they simply call 'Tommie'), and is given a tour of their warships. Aristodemos is later mentioned as being one of the three hundred selected to accompany Leonidas to hold up the Persian army at the Hot Gates. He is also part of a three-man envoy sent to Athens a short time before the battle to finalize details of the allied Greek forces' defenses. At the Hot Gates before the battle is begun, a Persian herald is sent to convince the Greek allies to submit; the herald turns out to be Tommie, who calls out by name for each man of the envoy he had met at Rhodes (all four of whom are among the three hundred), before requesting to speak with Leonidas directly. Despite their refusal to surrender, Tommie presents a golden goblet as a gift to the Greeks, handing it to Aristodemos who in turn passes it to Leonidas. Before the fighting on the third day, Aristodemos is mentioned along with Eurytus to have been evacuated to the village of Alpenoi after eye-inflammation rendered them both sightless. Finally, Aristodemos's shameful treatment upon his return to Sparta is recalled, as well as his redemption by the heroic way he fought at Plataea.

A character slightly based on Aristodemus named Dilios appears in and partly narrates Frank Miller's 1998 graphic novel 300, which retells the events of the Battle of Thermopylae. In the 2006 movie adaptation of the same name, Dilios was portrayed by David Wenham. Unlike Aristodemus, Dilios is not ordered home because of infection, although he does lose an eye in combat. It was so that he can use his oratorial skills to tell the story of his comrades in order to inspire the rest of Sparta, and then all of Greece. As such, he faces no scorn from his comrades on his return, and is later seen leading the Spartan army into battle at Plataea.

The character also appears in the sequel 300: Rise of an Empire, where he follows Queen Gorgo into battle and fights alongside her and Themistocles. The three of them survive the events of the film.
