= Amphicrates of Athens =

Amphicrates of Athens (Greek: Ἀμφικράτης) was a sophist and rhetorician (of the Asiatic school).

== Biographical information ==
Amphicrates was forced to leave Athens (for his own safety from the hatred of later critics, additional sources show him instead only visiting his destination ) in 86 B.C, living henceforward in Seleucia on the Tigris. When responding to a plea for the creation of a rhetoric school in Seleucia he replied that he could not for

a dish cannot hold a dolphin

His exile from Greece culminated in death from starvation, caused supposedly by his own abstinence.

== See also ==
- ...bigger fish to fry
