= Andromachus of Cyprus =

- Rank: Admiral
- Conflicts: Siege of Tyre

Andromachus of Cyprus (Ancient Greek: Ἀνδρόμαχος) was an allied admiral of Alexander the Great during the Siege of Tyre in 332 BC. He may have been the same Andromachus who was shortly afterward appointed the governor of Coele-Syria, and was burnt to death by the Samaritans.
