= Eurytus of Sparta =

Spartan soldier (died 480 BC)

Eurytus or Eurýtos (Ancient Greek: Εύρυτος) was the name of a Spartan warrior, one of the Three Hundred sent to face the Persians at the Battle of Thermopylae in 480 BC. Eurytus and a companion, Aristodemus were stricken with an eye disease and ordered by Leonidas to return home prior to the final day of the battle. While lying ill in a nearby village, the two were informed of the Persian encirclement of the pass, and could not reach an agreement on a course of action. Eurytus donned his armor and turned back, ordering his helot attendant to lead him back to the battle. He entered the battle blind and was slain. Aristodemus returned to Sparta, where he was treated as a disgrace until he redeemed himself when he died fighting at the Battle of Plataea the following year.
