= Andromachus (grammarian) =

Grammarian of ancient Greece

Andromachus (Ancient Greek: Ἀνδρόμαχος) was a grammarian of ancient Greece. He was quoted in the scholia on Homer. There has been disagreement among scholars about whether he was the author of the Etymologicum Magnum.
