= Jacque Alexander Tardy =

- Born: 1767; France
- Died: June 15, 1827 (aged 59–60) off coast of Norfolk, VA

Jacque Alexander Tardy (c. 1767 – June 15, 1827) better known as "Tardy the Pirate", (a.k.a. John Tardy or John Late) was an unsuccessful and atypical pirate who usually poisoned his victims. Most known for his last act of piracy of the brig Crawford, he wore a blue velvet frock coat, carried a cane and was small of stature with fine features and a dark complexion. At the time of his death he had grey hair and wore dentures.

== Early life ==
Alexander Tardy was the eldest son born in France in about 1767 to a wealthy family which fled to Saint-Domingue escaping the French Revolution. He and his family lived on a plantation there until the Haitian Revolution again displaced them. He and his father (or uncle) fled this time to Philadelphia, PA. In Philadelphia, PA by 1797, Tardy had opened a tin shop which he advertised in the local paper, at 51 North 3rd Street. He later moved to Charleston, SC where he advertised as a tinsmith at 131 Queen Street by 1806. On June 16, 1809, there was a fire in his tin shop, which burnt to the ground along with two adjacent homes on Bay Street. On June 24, 1809, Tardy received $800 of fire insurance funds from the London Phoenix Fire Company, for his house and the kitchen. By November 11, 1809, he had set up shop as a tinsmith in Augusta, GA on Broad Street.

In 1812 Tardy's family pressured Captain John Smith of the USS Congress (1799) into taking him on as a captain's steward. Tardy was brought back to shore at Norfolk, VA, after being publicly flogged aboard ship, for stealing the captain's property and selling it to other officers. Tardy was officially dismissed March 8, 1814, at Portsmouth, NH, having fully served the term of his enlistment from the U.S. Navy. He was suspected of poisoning Captain John Smith while on board the USS Congress. Captain Smith died August 6, 1815, in Philadelphia, PA, at the age of 35 from a "declining liver".

In 1814 Tardy impersonated a Frenchman, who had also escaped from San Domingue, and attempted to retrieve the Frenchman's property from a ship's hold. He employed lawyer William Hunter, who discovered Tardy was an impostor and accused Tardy, who then left town in haste. That same year, he moved to Boston where he apprenticed under a dentist, who dismissed him after finding Tardy to be more interested in the application of the various medications, than dentistry. In Boston Tardy was caught stealing Captain George Washington Balch's pocketbook from the Eastern Stage House, managed by Benjamin Hale, at 45 Ann St. (now North St.). He was sentenced to 5 days in solitary confinement, followed by 3 years hard labor in the Charlestown State Prison in Charlestown, Boston, Massachusetts.

== Maria ==
On December 3 after Tardy was released from prison, he boarded the brig Maria, a ship bound for Charleston, SC. He poisoned Captain Latham and 7 others aboard the Maria, secretly putting arsenic in the hash served for breakfast on the morning of the 7th. Tardy, claiming to be a doctor, advised the use of castor oil and abstaining from water to everyone, John Benjamin from North Carolina, was thought to have drunk water and died within 24 hours as a result. Tardy accused the ship's cook John Gibson of the poisoning. John Gibson was tried for and convicted of the crime in Charleston, SC. He was hanged March 4, 1817, still protesting his innocence.

== Regulator ==
On June 17, 1817, Tardy boarded the Regulator in Boston, MA bound for Philadelphia, PA. He poisoned the sugar used for morning coffee with arsenic, again administering a "sweet oil" as a remedy. One victim, Godfrey Daniel Lehman, a 35-year-old German citizen (from the French military service) on his way to visit his brother in Philadelphia died. Tardy blamed the cook of the Regulator for poisoning. Captain Presbury Norton's knowledge of the cook and his testimony cleared the cook of suspicion. Tardy claimed that Mr. Lehman had left his possessions to him. The Captain refused to hand over Mr. Lehman's things to Tardy. Tardy spent the night at The Mansion House Hotel on Third Street, then moved to a house at Vine and Water Streets, where he began planning another piracy. Someone he confided to betrayed him, Tardy was arrested and tried for poisoning the crew of a vessel. Due to lack of testimony, Tardy was only convicted of conspiracy to poison the crew of a vessel. He was sentenced to 7 years of hard labor in Walnut Street Prison. He was released July 17, 1824. He booked passage to Savannah aboard the brig Frances, but was put ashore with his luggage when he was recognized.

== Cora ==
By October of that year, he was in Charleston, SC advertising himself as a dentist. On November 18, 1825, at 9:00 pm Tardy attempted to steal a pilot boat named Cora from the dock in Charleston, with the aid of two of the boat's crew members. The owners of the boat, William, Copes and Delany, ambushed him during the attempt. Tardy fired two pistols at them in an attempt to escape. March 3, 1825, he was convicted of conspiracy to steal a pilot boat and sentenced to 2 years in the Old Charleston Jail.

== Crawford ==
Following Tardy's release from jail he travelled to Cuba, where on January 24, 1827, Tardy received a signed petition to practice dentistry. There Tardy teamed up with Jose Murando (a.k.a. Courro), Jose Hilario Casares (a.k.a. Pepe), and Felix Barbieto, intending to steal a ship and flee to Africa or Europe with its cargo. Tardy met Captain Henry Brightman of Troy, Massachusetts in port. Tardy introduced himself as a doctor to Captain Brightman who then consulted about his asthma. Tardy sent 3 vials of "asthma medication" to Captain Brightman, before the ship set sail. Tardy's plan was to poison most of those aboard once they were at sea, while keeping those alive that might aid with navigation and translation. Tardy and his co-conspirators boarded the brig Crawford at the port of Mantanzas, Cuba, as two separate parties, Felix with a large trunk he claimed contained $17,000 in gold.

The Crawford sailed May 28 with mate Edmund Dobson, Norman Robinson, a North Kingstown RI carpenter named Eldred Holloway, an Irish carpenter, Ferdinand Ginoulhiac, Nathaniel P. Deane, cook Stephen Gibbs, Joseph Doliver, Asa Bicknell, and Oliver Potter. On May 31, Captain Brightman was ill and confined to his berth (probably due to his "asthma medicine"), the rest of the passengers and crew were ill shortly after eating a breakfast prepared by Tardy.

The violence began at 1:40 am on June 1. Pepe was in the companion-way, Couro in the forecastle and Felix in midship. Victims Captain Brightman, Mr. Robinson, the American and Irish carpenters were sleeping in the cabin, Ginoulhiac, Dobson, Deane, and Doliver were on deck; and Bicknell, Potter and Gibbs were in the forecastle. Tardy approached Doliver, who was at the helm, asking him about his course. As Doliver bent over to check his course more precisely, Tardy cut him twice quickly across his throat. Doliver, still alive, escaped to the main rigging. Tardy clapped his hands giving the signal to his accomplices who began screaming intended to rouse everyone. The American carpenter was the first to exit the cabin, and was immediately stabbed by Pepe, and following a struggle, Pepe used an axe to split the American's chest. Captain Brightman was next to rush on deck and was felled by Felix with an axe. The Irish carpenter was also axed on his way out of the cabin. Mr. Robinson saw the Irishman meet his fate and decided to jump from the cabin window into the ocean. Meanwhile, Cuorro in the forecastle had stabbed Potter, Gibbs, and Bicknell in succession. Deane was missed in the darkness and escaped overboard into the sea without injury. Dobson who had awoken to the screeching, ran to the forecastle, where he saw Pepe with a knife in his hand prepared to strike. Attempting to avoid the blow, he was stabbed in the left shoulder. As Dobson approached the main rigging, he saw Potter, who was supporting himself with the railing, hands over his stomach. Potter asked Dobson if there was anything with which they could defend themselves. Dobson grabbed a handspike, which Potter took, and they ascended the main shrouds where Doliver had taken refuge. When they reached the cross-trees, Potter, intestines protruding through his wounded abdomen, fainted. He was prevented from falling, by Dobson and Doliver. At this time, they heard something thrown into the water and assumed that bodies had been thrown overboard. They also heard the voices of Robinson and Deane in the water unsuccessfully asking for something to keep them afloat.

Tardy called to Dobson "Mr. Dobson, where are you?" Dobson replied, "In the maintop." Tardy replied "Are you wounded?" Dobson replied "Yes." Tardy asked Dobson to descend, Dobson refused. When Tardy assured Dobson he would be spared, if he would come down, Dobson descended and was immediately surrounded by the Spaniards. Tardy asked the whereabouts of the trunk brought on board by Felix. Dobson said he had put the trunk in the stateroom, but didn't know what had become of it. Tardy explained that the Captain had refused the Spaniards access to the trunk, causing them to suspect it had been put ashore in Matanzas. Therefore, they decided to take the law into their own hands, and killed the Captain taking control of the ship. They determined that rather than continue to the United States they should instead sail for Europe and if Dobson would assist them he would be well paid for his services when the ship's cargo was sold. Dobson agreed and obtained permission to lay down. Tardy then asked him where Dolliver and Potter were. Dobson replied that they were in the Maintop. The two men were then asked to descend, repeatedly assured by Tardy that no harm would befall them. Doliver came down and was immediately stabbed by Courro and pushed overboard by Pepe. In the water, Doliver told Potter to stay where he was or he would certainly be killed. His last words were addressed to the Spaniards, saying that they were "barbarous and bloodthirsty wretches, equally destitute of courage and humanity". Shortly afterwards, Potter fell from the rigging landing heavily in the water with no struggle, causing Dobson to assume he was either dead or had fainted.

As dawn arrived, Pepe and Courro came on deck with two muskets, intent on shooting Gibbs who had fled to the fore topmast. They called an injured Asa Bicknell up from below, who was bandaged and writhing in pain, Bicknell threw himself overboard and was shot at while falling by Courro. Pepe then also shot at Bicknell, causing him to shriek. Pepe then descended into the cabin with a rope and returned to deck dragging behind him the dead Irish carpenter, who was then thrown overboard. Gibbs was called for again and with repeated assurances of safety, the cook descended to the deck and was ordered to make breakfast. The deck and the rigging were then washed and sails painted to conceal the blood. Tardy dressed Dobson's wounds from his medicine chest, and assured him of his safety.

They decided to go to Norfolk to resupply, on arrival they were spoken to by three separate pilot boat captains. Tardy told them he was a Spanish vessel from Matanzas, bound for Hamburg, he refused to take a pilot, saying he knew the bay. Tardy told Dobson he could still take his life and asked if he could trust Dobson to be silent. Dobson assured him that he could. Another pilot boat hailed them, Tardy refused them, but misunderstanding him the boat came alongside anyway. Dobson convinced Tardy that if he continued to refuse pilot it would be suspicious so Tardy consented. At 6:00 the evening of June 12, they anchored a hundred yards from shore at Old Point Comfort. Dobson asked Tardy to lower a boat and hand him an oar so that he could bring it alongside for Tardy. Tardy and Ginoulhiac lowered the boat, taking advantage of the moment Dobson then sculled quickly toward shore. Tardy seeing Dobson departing called after him "Mr. Dobson, are you going to betray me?" Dobson answered, "No". On reaching shore he related the occurrences aboard the Crawford to the officers at Fort Monroe, who then took possession of the vessel.

Edmund Dobson of Somerset, MA, Ferdinand Ginoulhiac, and Stephen Gibbs were the only survivors. Felix, Cuorro, and Pepe were tried by Justice John Marshall in Richmond, VA and hanged for piracy.

DEATH

Tardy was discovered in the Captains quarters where he had slit his own throat. He was buried at low tide mark face down at Old Point Comfort in front of Fort Monroe. (From Find a Grave)

== Phrenology ==
On August 1, 1827, Dr. Brereton of the Washington Phrenological Society requested Tardy's skull for study. His body was exhumed and the skull prepared by J. Everett, a surgeon in the US Army stationed at Fort Monroe. The skull was transported to Washington, D.C., by Commodore John Rogers. Dr. Brereton made three casts of Tardy's skull. The casts were sent to Dr. George Douglas Cameron of the Liverpool Phrenological Society, Dr. Johann Spurzheim of the London Society of Phrenology, and Dr.George Combe founder of the Edinburgh Phrenological Society. The cast sent to Dr. George Combe is now in the collections of The Anatomical Museum of the School of Biomedical Sciences at the University of Edinburgh. At the request of the University of Edinburgh the cast of Tardy's skull was laser scanned, then 3d printed and from that, a facial reconstruction was done by Amy Thornton of Dundee University. The model of Tardy is set to go on display at the Anatomical Museum in Edinburgh.

== Play and book ==
The Eulogy of Captain Henry Brightman play

Alexander Tardy: The Poisoner, Or Pirate Chief of St. Domingo by M. M. Huet published by T.B. Peterson - 107pp.
