= Andromachus (cavalry general) =

- Rank: Generał

Andromachus (Ancient Greek: Ἀνδρόμαχος), a cavalry general, was commander of the Eleans in 364 BCE. During the Arcadians' campaign against Elis, while the Arcadians were encamped between Cyllene and the capital, Andromachus launched an attack against them. His army was defeated and he committed suicide as a consequence.
