= Joanna Pfaff-Czarnecka =

Swiss professor

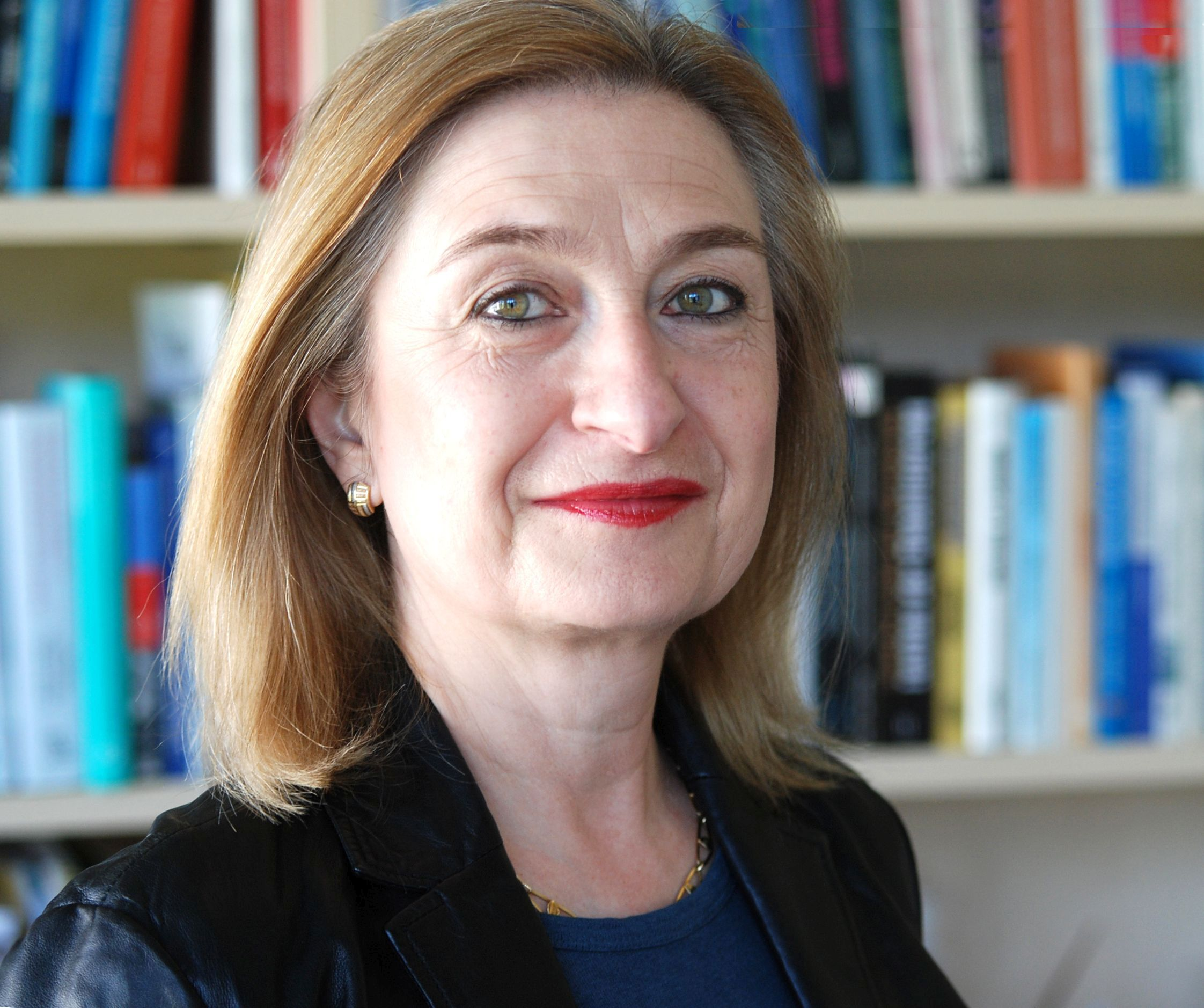
- Born: 20 July 1956 (age 70); Warsaw, Poland
- Education: University of Zurich
- Scientific career
- Fields: Sociology
- Workplaces: Bielefeld University
- Thesis: Power and ritual purity
- Doctoral advisor: Prof. Lorenz G. Loeffler

Joanna Pfaff-Czarnecka (born 20 July 1956) is a university professor (emerita) in the Faculty of Sociology at Bielefeld University, Germany. She is a former Pro-Vice-Rector at Bielefeld University and former Dean of the Faculty of Sociology at the university.

== Early life and education ==
Pfaff-Czarnecka was born in Warsaw, Poland. She moved with her family to Switzerland in 1972. Between 1975 and 1983 Pfaff-Czarnecka studied social anthropology, law, communication studies, European anthropology and art history at the University of Zurich, Switzerland, and also completed a doctoral degree there.

== Career ==
Pfaff-Czarnecka has engaged in several academic administration and offices: she was President of the Swiss Society of Social Anthropology (1996–1999); Pro-Vice-Rector of Bielefeld University (2007–2009); member of the Commission 38 of the CNRS (France; 2004–2007); Dean of the Faculty of Sociology at Bielefeld University (2018–19); Co-director of the Center for Interdisciplinary Research (Bielefeld University; 2011–2019) and senate member of the German Research Foundation (DFG).

== Research ==
Pfaff-Czarnecka conducted field research in the Himalayan region (especially in Nepal) as well as in the middle European immigration societies. Among her research topics are the Hindu caste system, democratization processes at the sub and the supra-national level, ethnic relations and the theory of belonging.

She conducts research on the social life of universities, focusing on heterogeneities and inequalities in study processes, as well as on knowledge production and circulation in the Asian region.

=== Main publications ===
- ‘The Sense of Academic Merit. Dalit Students at South Asian Universities. International Sociology, Vol. 41, issue 1 Sociology 026, Vol. 41(1) 135–157, 2026-01. doi:10.1177/02685809251400641. 2026
- ’Entering the Academic World: Educated Dalits’ Quandaries in Contemporary Nepal’, in D. Gellner and K. Adhikari. Nepal’s Dalits in Transition. Kathmandu: Vajra University Press. ISBN 9789937624367, 2024
- The Price of Belonging. Perspectives from Asia. edited together with Éva Rozalia Hölzle. London / Boston: Brill. 2023.
- Universities as Transformative Social Spaces. Mobilities and Mobilizations from South Asian Perspectives. edited together with Andrea Kölbel and Susan Thieme. Oxford: Oxford University Press. 2022
- Nepal and the Wealth of Knowledge. Inequality, Aspiration, Competition and Belonging. The Mahesh Chandra Regmi Lecture. Kathmandu, Nepal: Social Science Baha. 2019.
- Zugehörigkeit in der mobilen Welt: Politiken der Verortung. Das Politische als Kommunikation, Band 3. Göttingen: Wallstein, 2012.
- Ethnic Futures. State and Identity in Four Asian Countries, written together with D. Rajasingham, A. Nandy and T. Gomez. New Delhi: Sage, 1999. (several editions)
- Macht und rituelle Reinheit. Hinduistisches Kastenwesen und ethnische Beziehungen im Entwicklungsprozess Nepals. Grüsch: Rüegger, 1989.

=== Edited volumes (selection) ===
- Das soziale Leben der Universität. Bielefeld: Transcript Verlag, 2017.
- Spaces of Violence in South Asian Democracies: Citizenship, Nationalist Exclusion and the (il)legitimate Use of Force, together with E. Gerharz. Asian Journal of Social Science (Brill) 2017, 45(6): 613–638.
- Facing Globalization in the Himalayas. Belonging and the Politics of the Self, together with G. Toffin. New Delhi: Sage, 2013.
- The Politics of Belonging in the Himalayas: Local Attachments and Boundary Dynamics, together with G. Toffin. New Delhi: Sage, 2011.
- Nationalism and Ethnicity in Nepal, together with D. Gellner und J. Whelpton. Kathmandu: Vajra Publishers, 2008. (several editions)
- Die Ethnisierung des Politischen. Identitätspolitiken in Lateinamerika, Asien und den USA, together with C. Büschges. Frankfurt/New York: Campus, 2007.
- Rituale heute: Theorien, Kontroversen, Entwürfe, together with C. Caduff. Berlin: Reimer, 1999. (two editions)

=== Recent publications ===
- Pfaff-Czarnecka, Joanna (2020): Shaping Asia through Student Mobilities. American Behavioral Scientist: p. 1-15.
- Pfaff-Czarnecka, Joanna, Brosius, Christiane (2019): Shaping Asia: Connectivities, Comparisons, Collaborations. isa.e-Forum, ISA (Editorial Arrangement of isa.e-Forum)
- Pfaff-Czarnecka, Joanna (2019): Nepal and the Wealth of Knowledge. Inequality, Aspiration, Competition and Belonging. (The Mahesh Chandra Regmi Lecture 2019) Kathmandu/Nepal: Social Science Baha.
- Pfaff-Czarnecka, Joanna (2019): Burdened Futures: Educated Dalits' Quandaries in Contemporary Nepal. Contributions to Nepalese Studies 46 (Special Issue: Nepal's Dalits in transition): 195–227.
- Pfaff-Czarnecka, Joanna (2018): Education sentimentale in migrant students' university trajectories. Family, and other significant relations. In: Rötterger-Rössler, Birgitt, Slaby, Jan: Affect in relation. Families, places, technologies. London/New York: Routledge, p. 50-71.
