= School climate =

Quality and character of school life

School climate refers to the quality and character of school life. It has been described as "the heart and soul of the school ... that essence of a school that leads a child, a teacher, and an administrator to love the school and to look forward to being there each school day." A positive school climate helps people feel socially, emotionally and physically safe in schools. It includes students', parents' and school personnel's norms, beliefs, relationships, teaching and learning practices, as well as organizational and structural features of the school. According to the National School Climate Council, a sustainable, positive school climate promotes students' academic and social emotional development.

Many factors can affect the quality and character of school life. There is no consensus on the definition or dimensions of school climate. However, the factors that shape school climate are often grouped into four main dimensions. These dimensions are: safety, teaching and learning (academic climate), relationships (community climate), and the environment. Each dimension is discussed in detail below.

Positive school climate is related to many positive student outcomes. For example, positive school climate is associated to higher academic performance, better mental health, and less bullying. Improving school climate can be used as a preventative approach to reduce disruptive behavior and improve attendance, achievement, and student and parent satisfaction with school. Many assessment tools and interventions have therefore been developed to help school in the climate improve process.

== Dimensions ==
=== Safety ===
All humans need to feel safe socially, mentally, and physically. Feeling safe in school influences students' learning and their general development. However, many students do not feel safe in schools. Most students are not necessarily exposed to physical violence, but many students are exposed to social, emotional, and intellectual violence. A positive school climates therefore means feeling physically and emotionally safe and having clear and consistent rules to maintain order and discipline.

- Physical Safety is the degree to which violence, aggression, and physical bullying are present. It also refers to the strategies used to eliminate violence (e.g., security guards and metal detectors).
- Identity Safety pertains to humans being an asset in the classroom rather than a barrier. This refers to how a school can promote positive relationships and opportunities to learn where students feel they are welcomed, supported and valued as a member of the learning community.
- Emotional Safety includes available school-based mental-health services (e.g. counseling services, caring and supportive staff), an absence of verbal bullying, and positive attitudes about individual differences. It is also affected by the students' and staff's attitudes about bullying and their response to it. There is experimental evidence that the adults in the organizational institution tend to regard bullying or social violence as less severe, even when the students have reported them as severe problems.
- Order and discipline refers to how often students break the school's rules, and how misbehavior is handled. Schools with a positive climate have low rates of delinquency and clearly communicated rules that students consider to be implemented fairly and consistently.

=== Academic climate ===
Academic climate refers to the teaching and learning practices promoted in the school. It is composed of three factors: leadership, teaching and learning, and professional development.

- Leadership refers to the role of the principal and administration. It is influenced by how well they communicate their vision for the school and how supportive and accessible they are.
- Teaching and learning refers to the actual methods and instructional practices used by teachers in their classrooms. It entails everything from the curriculum selected, evaluation methods, to how teachers communicate their expectations and give feedback to students. These practices influence student motivation and engagement in the classroom, which in turn affect academic performance.
- Professional development refers to teacher's access to training programs they find relevant and helpful, and that are in line with the needs of the school. In schools with a positive climate, teachers have ongoing access to training where they can learn new strategies to improve the way they teach.

=== Community ===
The quality of relationships between members of a school (teachers, students, and administrators) has an influence on students' behavior and achievement. The relationship between a student and their teacher affects their engagement in the classroom, self-esteem, and grades. The community aspect of school climate refers to the quality of relationships within a school. It also includes the school's connectedness, respect for diversity, and partnerships with other members of the community.

- Relationships refers the quality and consistency of relationships among students, staff members, and between teachers and students. School climate is affected by how much students and teachers support, trust, respect, and care for each other. The relationships between the adults in a school (e.g. teachers and principals) also has an important influence on school climate.
- Connectedness refers to students' feelings of attachment and belonging towards the school. Feeling accepted and included by the other members of the school will contribute to a positive school climate.
- Respect for diversity refers to treating members of any ethnicity, gender, sexual orientation, or religious affiliation equally. It also means cultivating awareness and appreciation for other cultures in classrooms.
- Community partnership refers to the involvement of parents and other community members in school life. It involves good communication between parents and school staff, high attendance of school events, the development of mentoring programs, and other initiatives that build relationships between students and the larger community.

=== Institutional environment ===
The physical layout, size, and material resources of a school also affect school climate. For instance, environmental variables such as classroom layout and activity schedules can influence how safe students feel and how well they perform in school. Environmental variables include the adequacy of the school setting, the maintenance and infrastructure of the building, and the accessibility and allocation of educational resources.

- Environmental adequacy refers to the physical characteristics of the school, such as cleanliness, lighting and temperature, and sound control, which all affect teaching and learning.
- Structural organization is the physical layout of the school itself (size, classroom size, number of unsupervised areas). It also includes organizational aspects, such as start and end times, and whether students are grouped based on ability. These characteristics can influence both feelings of safety and academic performance.
- Availability of resources refers to how much access students and teachers have to equipment, materials, and supplies that improve teaching (e.g., technology, tools, or books).

== Theoretical frameworks ==
There are several theories of school climate described in the research literature. They are ordered based on the scientific research that has supported them.

=== Bio-ecological theory ===
Urie Bronfenbrenner's (1979) bio-ecological framework suggests that human development occurs through the complex, reciprocal interactions that an individual has with others and the surrounding environment. This theory outlines four systems of operations including a microsystem, mesosystem, exosystem and macrosystem, where the self is microsystem and school is part of the mesosystem. It proposes that individuals have ultimate control over their own environments, altering and modifying to their needs, however, this is only possible through self-directed actions that combine biological and environmental attributes. One cannot engage in reconstructing their environment without both of these attributes working together. More depth of this concept can be referenced in the bioecological model. In the context of school climate, individual behaviors are shaped by the school environment, in which each child is embedded. For example, the structure and condition of the school, the use of specific school practices (e.g., disciplinary), and the interpersonal relationships between students and teachers, all play a role in influencing student development.

=== Risk and resilience perspective ===
The focus of this model is on identifying protective factors in a child's environment (e.g., supportive relationships) that promote healthy adjustment and reduce negative outcomes, despite the presence of risk. A risk factor refers to anything that increases a child's likelihood of experiencing a negative outcome in the future. For example, growing up in poverty is considered a risk factor. Children are considered resilient if they can rely on positive conditions or attributes (e.g., supportive relationships with teachers, academically challenging instruction) to buffer the negative effects of adversity. Psychological resilience has been studied since the 1970s and continues to grow in research.

=== Social cognitive theory ===
Environmental factors affect how students view themselves as active learners within the classroom. School climate plays a role in student development through the quality of interactions with others. For example, setting appropriate academic expectations, promoting supportive teacher-student relationships, and creating a safe and secure environment where students' feel comfortable taking academic risks, all play a role in student development. Research has shown that people have the natural tendency to affiliate with others. Therefore, students living in a cooperative, helpful class are more likely to feel identity safe as they develop a sense of belonging and contribute to their class community. When students cooperate, it is evident that their learning is increased, and they develop a positive attachment to school. This capacity to work together has been a hallmark of humanity and the basis for building a civil society.

=== Stage-environment fit theory ===
According to this theory, behavior, emotions, and thoughts are influenced by personal characteristics and the surrounding environment. In the context of school climate, the fit between students' psychological needs and the school environment plays a role in students' motivation for academic success. Because of the social nature of learning, the social identities of the teacher and each of the students is important and influences every interaction in the classroom. Students are affected behaviorally and emotionally by every encounter they have in the classroom. Humans have the tendency to conform to others. For example, if the teacher of a classroom has a confident and intelligent persona then the students are more likely to portray these same characteristics in the classroom. Adults from non-Western cultures often identify children's attention to and ability to copy adults actions as a social learning strategy and a sign of intelligence. When this external motivation to conform to others and the internal motivation to succeed tie together, this theory of being influenced by an environment come into play.

=== Social control theory ===
According to this theory, delinquency occurs when an individual's feelings of attachment towards others, commitment to current or future activities, involvement (i.e., time spent) in various activities, and commitment to the beliefs/moral value system of society are weakened. The quality of a schools' climate is important for promoting students' commitment and involvement in academic activities. A strong bond with the school community strengthens students' attachment to the school and encourages compliance to school norms. The interplay of these factors reduces the likelihood of deviant behavior.

== Impact ==
=== Mental health and social-emotional well-being ===
Studies have shown that school climate can directly affect students' mental health and social-emotional well-being. The quality of life within a school setting can promote the healthy social and emotional development of students. Many aspects linked to a positive school climate such as the ones described above (e.g. school belonging, respect for student opinions, and supportive relationships) are factors directly related in student psychological functioning. For instance, in a study that examined adolescents' perceptions of several dimensions of school climate, researchers emotional support from teachers and the promotion of autonomy and discussion were linked to fewer depressive symptoms in adolescents. When students perceive their classroom rules, school discipline, and overall school safety as fair, they are less likely to experience feelings of loneliness, anxiety, and depression (Grapham et al., 2006; Ozer & Weinstein, 2004). A positive school climate can also help students coping with social-emotional issues to develop resiliency.

Research findings have also shown that a negative school climate can have detrimental effects on students' psychological and social-emotional well-being, leading to mental health problems. For example, a higher incidence of conflict in schools is linked to a higher rate of childhood mental health disorders. A negative school climate can also make existing social-emotional difficulties worse, and these effects can be long-term. For example, the severity of a student's mental health problems can increase over time if classroom conditions do not improve. In a study of middle school adolescents' perceptions of school climate and its effect on psychological health, researchers found that dimensions of school climate (safety, relationships, connectedness, sense of belonging, etc.) and psychological and emotional health declined over three years. Additionally, declines in school climate were linked to declines in students' psychological adjustment. Posselt and Lipson found, in 2016, that those who perceived their classroom environments as highly competitive had a 37% higher chance of developing depression and a 69% higher chance of developing anxiety.

=== Academic achievement ===
A positive school climate is also important for student achievement. For example, in a study of elementary student achievement in reading and mathematics, positive teacher characteristics such as setting high but achievable goals, believing in students, and commitment to students' academic success was associated with higher standardized test scores. Research has shown that when teachers perceive themselves as efficacious, the school has effective principal leadership, and relationships between students and peers are positive, student standardized test scores, GPA, and grades are higher. These relationships have been found among students in kindergarten to grade 12.

There is also a relationship between school resource allocation and student achievement. Several research studies highlight the link between student achievement and resources such as teacher education and experience, class size, teacher to student ration, school facilities, classroom materials, and financial expenditures.

Structural features of the school, such as the temperature and age of the building, can affect student performance and school attendance. In a study of students' exposure to adverse school building conditions and absenteeism, researchers found that student absenteeism was associated with visible mold and poor ventilation, among other factors. If students are absent from school, academic achievement can be affected.

=== Behavioral outcomes ===
School climate has also been linked to behavioral problems within the school, such as bullying, delinquency, and aggressive behavior. A high-quality academic environment within the school can reduce behavioral problems. For example, both lower student and teacher reports of behavioral problems have been documented in schools where teachers provide feedback on students' homework, assist in student goal-achievement, and encourage students' commitment to academic success.

When students perceive that their school has a strong sense of solidarity and belonging, they are more likely to intervene or report when a peer engages in risk activities. Research studies have also shown that reductions in student behavioral problems, aggression, and victimization are associated with positive relationships among school staff and peers.

=== On teachers ===
The dimensions of school climate also affect teachers significantly. Teacher retention, or getting teachers to stay in the same school for many years, is an important issue in many schools. However, many factors linked to school climate have been found to affect teacher turnover rates. For instance, poor support from administration, student discipline problems, and not feeling they can contribute to decision making in the school are all conditions that are linked to poor teacher retention. The relationships between teachers and their colleagues and the school administration, also play an important role in teacher's commitment to their profession. In addition, school climate factors can influence teachers' mental health. For instance, poor relationships with students and colleagues and low parental and community involvement are related to emotional exhaustion (burnout) in teachers. A negative school climate is also associated to teachers having more feelings of low personal accomplishment, more cynicism, and depersonalization.

== Improvement ==
The best way to improve school climate is different from school to school. The promotion of a positive school climate is a general process that varies based on an individual school's strengths and weaknesses across different dimensions. Nonetheless, some general guidelines, or key practices, have been found to be effective to facilitate the process. School climate improvement can be defined as an intentional, strategic, collaborative, transparent, and coordinated effort to make school learning environments stronger. Research suggests that engaging all members of the community is crucial for successful school improvement efforts. According to the National School Climate Center, an effective school climate improvement process is one that engages all stakeholders in six key practices:

1. A collaborative, democratic decision-making process that involves all stakeholders. Stakeholders include not only school personnel and students, but also families and community members. These stakeholders have different roles and perspectives (e.g., teacher, bus driver, administration, maintenance staff, etc.)
2. Action planning, intervention, and program implementation are driven by both quantitative (e.g., survey) and qualitative (e.g., interviews, focus groups) data, with the goal of continuously improving school climate. Frequent data collection should occur to evaluate and further develop the school improvement process.
3. The unique needs of the students and school community are used to inform school improvement goals.
4. Offering school personnel opportunities to learn as teams or to build learning communities so they help each other obtain, improve, and retain the skills and knowledge needed to do their jobs competently.
5. Scientific research must be used to inform curriculum, instruction, student supports, and interventions. These school practices must also be based on sound cognitive, social-emotional, and ecological theories of youth development. Healthy student development and learning environments are promoted through the implementation of strength- and risk-based practices and programs.
6. Through the school improvement process, policies and procedures pertaining to the school learning environment, as well as operational infrastructure to facilitate the collection of data, effective planning, implementation, evaluation, and sustainability, are strengthened.

=== Measures ===
In schools, obtaining an accurate picture of a climate is an essential component for improving the learning environment. Information about school climate can be collected in many ways; however, surveys are the most common method used by researchers (92%). Conducting interviews and focus groups are other ways to collect information on school climate, with an estimated 8% of research studies making use of these methods. Another, less common, method is the use of observational reports and ratings of school climate. An example of this method of measurement is visiting elementary schools to rate school design patterns of outside space and the condition of bathroom facilities.

As part of the school climate improvement process, these measures can be used to highlight a school's areas of strength and areas in need of improvement. It can also be used to assess changes in school climate over time. School climate can be assessed indirectly through measures such as student attendance, suspensions, teacher turnover, or student mobility. It can also be assessed more directly by gathering information from members of the school.

When gathering information about school climate, it is recommended to gather information from multiple perspectives (e.g., teachers, administrators, students, etc.). For instance, a study comparing parents', teachers', and students' perceptions of school climate found that students reported worse ratings of safety and connectedness than the adults. In addition, some student characteristics also affect their perception of school climate. Therefore, having behavior problems, being held back a grade, coming from a single-parent family, or having a different ethnic background can all influence a student's perception of school climate. This emphasizes the importance of gathering information from different informants when assessing school climate.

==== Diversity ====
Students' race and ethnicity can have an influence on their perception of the school's climate. For instance, a study collected information from African American and white middle school students found differences in their perception of racial climate in their school. African American, female, and lower income students have a more negative perception of the racial climate than white, middle class, and male students. Another study also conducted with middle school students found that students from a Hispanic/Latino background felt that relationships with teachers played a bigger role in their perception of community climate than relationships with students. In contrast, student relationships was a higher priority for Asian and white students.

Sexual orientation can also have an important effect on students' experiences in school. For instance, a survey of American middle and high school students conducted in 2013 found that more than half the students who identified as gay, bisexual, lesbian, or transgender felt unsafe at school because of their sexual orientation, and more than a third felt unsafe because of their gender expression. The survey suggests that LGBT students' ethnicity also affects their perception of school safety. For example, it was found that LGBT students who had an Asian background reported lower rates of peer victimization directed at their sexual orientation or gender expression. These findings highlight the importance of considering the perspective of students from different cultural and ethnic backgrounds when trying to improve school climate for all.

== See also ==
- Bullying in teaching
- School belonging
- Teacher burnout
- Mental health in education
