= Mental health in education =

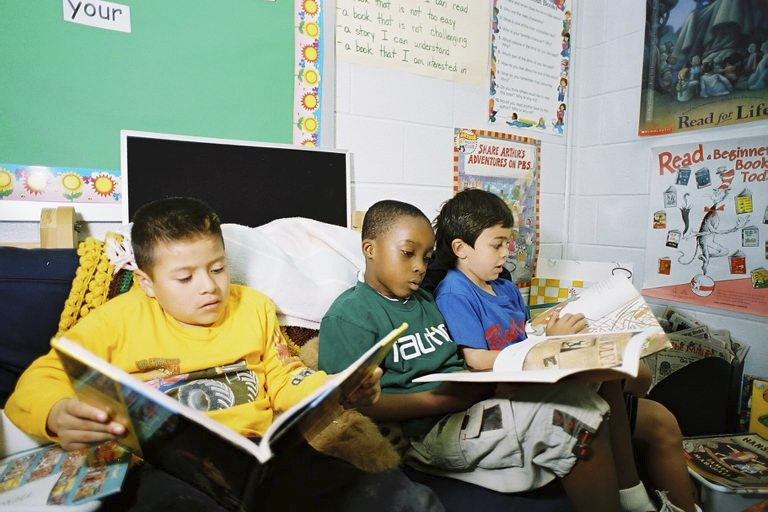
Primary school children in classroom

Mental health in education encompasses the impact of mental health on educational outcomes, as well as the psychological effects of educational methods on students and teachers. Although mental health—including emotional, psychological, and social aspects—is often viewed as an adult issue, almost half of adolescents in the United States are affected by mental disorders, and about 20% of these are categorized as "severe." Mental health issues can be a major problem for students in terms of academic and social success in school.

Education systems around the world treat this topic differently, both directly through official policies and indirectly through cultural views on mental health and well-being. Some systems try to effectively identify mental health disorders and treat them using therapy, medication, or other tools of alleviation. Schools may try to promote mental health awareness and resources, or help struggling students with interventions, support groups, and therapies. Such policies can reduce the stigma behind asking for help, leading to more students reaching out for help. Teaching mental health literacy can also give students knowledge and skills around mental health. These resources can help reduce the negative impact on mental health. Schools can create mandatory classes based on mental health that can help them see signs of mental health disorders.

== Prevalence of mental health issues in adolescents ==
According to the National Institute of Mental Health, approximately 46% of American adolescents aged 13–18 will suffer from some form of mental disorder. About 21% will suffer from a disorder that is categorized as "severe," meaning that the disorder impairs their daily functioning, but almost two-thirds of these adolescents will not receive formal mental health support. According to the World Health Organization, physical, emotional, and social problems such as poverty, abuse, or violence cause students to be vulnerable to mental health illnesses. An estimated one in seven (14.3%) of 10- to 19-year-olds experience mental health conditions that remain unrecognized and untreated. The most common types of disorders among adolescents as reported by the NIMH is anxiety disorders (including generalized anxiety disorder, phobias, post-traumatic stress disorder, obsessive-compulsive disorder, and others), with a lifetime prevalence of about 25% in youth aged 13–18 and 6% of those cases being categorized as severe. Next are mood disorders (major depressive disorder, dysthymic disorder, and/or bipolar disorder), with a lifetime prevalence of 14% and 4.7% for severe cases in adolescents. A similarly common disorder is attention deficit hyperactivity disorder (ADHD), which is categorized as a childhood disorder but oftentimes carries through into adolescence and adulthood. The prevalence for ADHD in American adolescents is 9%, and 1.8% for severe cases. It is important to understand that ADHD is a serious issue in not only children but adults. When children have ADHD a number of mental illnesses can come from that which can affect their education and hold them back from succeeding.

According to Mental Health America, more than 10% of young people exhibit symptoms of depression strong enough to severely undermine their ability to function at school, at home, or whilst managing relationships.

A 2021 study conducted by NIMH managed to link 31.4% of suicide deaths to a mental health disorder, the most common ones being attention-deficit/hyperactivity disorder (ADHD) or depression. Suicide was the second leading cause of death among persons aged 10–29 years in the United States during 2011–2019. More teenagers and young adults die from suicide than cancer, heart disease, AIDS, birth defects, stroke, pneumonia, influenza, and chronic lung disease combined. There are an average of over 3,470 attempts by students in grades 9–12.

According to APA, the percentage of students seeking college mental health counselling has been rising in recent years. With anxiety as the most common factor, depression as the second, stress as the third, family issues as the fourth, and academic performance and relationship problems as the fifth and sixth.

== Common disorders effects on academics and school life ==
Mental disorders can affect classroom learning, such as poor attendance, difficulties with academic performance, poor social integration, trouble adjusting to school, problems with behavior regulation, and attention and concentration issues, all of which is critical to the overall success of the student. Not only do mental health disorders affect the individual's life, but also the competitive job market. Students who are unable to perform in school will be less likely to be able to perform in the workforce. High school students who screen positive for psychosocial dysfunction report three times as many absent and tardy days as students who do not identify dysfunction. This leads to extremely high dropout rates and lower overall academic achievement. In the United States, only 40 percent of students with emotional, behavioral, and mental health disorders graduate from high school, compared to the national average of 76 percent. An analysis of 40,350 undergraduates from 70 institutions by Posselt and Lipson found that they had a 37% higher chance of developing depression and a 69% higher chance of developing anxiety if they perceived their classroom environments as highly competitive. The mental health crisis in the United States has also been linked to the rise in course rigor in American highschools due to how competitive college admissions have been in the past 30 years

=== Anxiety ===
Students with anxiety disorders are statistically less likely to attend college than those without it. In addition, those with social phobias are twice as likely to fail a grade or not finish high school as compared to students without the condition. Anxiety disorders are typically more difficult to recognize than disruptive behavior disorders, such as ADHD, because the symptoms are internalized. Anxiety may manifest as recurring fears and worries about routine parts of everyday life, avoiding activities, school, or social interactions. Anxiety can also interfere with the ability to focus and learn.

There is a specific character that people with anxiety often exhibit. People with anxiety experience frequent worries and fears about everyday situations. Anxiety can also be identified as a sudden feeling of intense fear or terror that can reach a peak within minutes. These anxiety symptoms usually develop during childhood or teen years and may continue into adulthood. Some examples of symptoms include: feeling nervous, restless or tense, having a sense of impending danger, panic, or doom, having an increased heart rate, breathing rapidly, sweating, trembling, feeling weak or tired, trouble concentrating or thinking about anything other than the present worry, having trouble sleeping, experiencing gastrointestinal problems, having difficulty controlling worry, or having the urge to avoid things that trigger anxiety.

There are multiple types of anxieties that each present with unique symptoms. The most common type of anxiety is Generalized Anxiety Disorder, which presents with persistent and excessive worry that interferes with daily activities, feeling on edge/fatigued, worries about everyday things, and can cause physical symptoms, such as restlessness. Panic disorders, characterized by recurrent panic attacks which consist of palpitations, sweating, trembling, shortness of breath, chest pain, dizziness, and a fear of dying, can cause physical and psychological distress. People with phobias experience excessive and persistent fear of objects or situations that are generally not harmful. Fear is excessive, which patients are aware of. Examples of phobias can include public speaking, spiders, or flying. Social anxiety disorder is a condition where people have significant anxiety about being embarrassed, so they will avoid situations that could cause embarrassment. An example of a situation that would be avoided would be eating or drinking in public. Finally, separation anxiety disorder is characterized by excessive fear or anxiety about separation which can cause functioning problems. People may be worried about leaving others and may have attachment issues.

Treatments for anxiety can include medications, such as antidepressants, anti-anxiety medications, sedatives (such as benzodiazepines), and beta blockers. These medications function to relieve short-term anxiety, but are not meant to be used as long-term solutions. Cognitive behavioral therapy is the most efficient form of treatment and is used as a short-term treatment. This therapy focuses on teaching specific skills for coping in order to improve symptoms. This can include exposure therapy, which increases exposure to potential triggers and is used to treat phobias.

=== Depression ===
Depression can cause students to have problems in class, from completing their work, to even attending class at all. In 2020, approximately 13% of youth aged 12 to 17 years old have had one major depressive episode (MDE) in the past year, with an overwhelming 70% left untreated. According to the National Center for Mental Health Checkups at Columbia University, "High depression scores have been associated with low academic achievement, high scholastic anxiety, increased school suspensions, and decreased ability or desire to complete homework, concentrate, and attend classes." Depression symptoms can make it challenging for students to keep up with course loads, or even find the energy to make it through the full school day.

Depression can be defined as a multi-problematic medical illness that negatively affects how one feels, thinks, and acts. The symptoms of depression can cause disturbances with interpersonal, social, and occupational functioning. This can later lead onto having varieties of emotional and physical problems. This can also decrease the ability to function mentally and physically. Some examples of depression symptoms are feeling sad, loss of interest, changes in appetite, trouble sleeping, loss of energy, increase in purposeless physical activity, feeling worthless, difficulty in thinking, concentrating, or making decisions, and thoughts of death or suicide. These symptoms must last two weeks and also represent a change in functioning in order for a diagnosis of depression.

Treatments for depression can include normothymic drugs, antidepressant drugs (which have significant side effects), solving unresolved conflicts, relaxation, light therapy, sleep deprivation therapy, electroconvulsive therapy, as well as cognitive behavioral therapy. Depression treatments need to be aimed at long-term treatment because depression can reoccur if not completely treated. Medications are better short-term treatments, while cognitive behavioral therapy is typically used as a more long-term treatment.

Adolescents and middle-aged single adults at risk for low self-esteem (Depression) can be predicted based on their level of education, fear of missing out, valuation of the modern materialistic value conception, life satisfaction, depression, and habitual social media distraction.

=== Attention deficit hyperactivity disorder ===
Attention disorders are the principal predictors of diminished academic achievement. Students with ADHD tend to have trouble mastering behaviors and practices demanded of them by the public education system in the United States, such as the ability to quietly sit still or to apply themselves to one focused task for extended durations. ADHD can mean that students have problems concentrating, filtering out distracting external stimuli, and seeing large tasks through to completion. These students can also struggle with time management and organization. Symptoms of ADHD can include inattention, hyperactivity, impulsivity, and other internalizing symptoms, such as depression.

ADHD stands for attention-deficit/hyperactivity disorder. This is considered as one of the most common mental disorders for children, however it affects many adults as well. Some examples of symptoms are not paying attention to details and making careless mistakes, having problems of staying focused on activities, not being able to be seen as listening, having problems in organizing, avoiding tasks, and forgetting daily tasks. These symptoms can cause a disturbance in the education of the affected student as well as other students in the class.

Treatments for ADHD can include behavioral therapy, medications (both stimulants and nonstimulants), education about ADHD, and training for parents on how to care for their affected children.

== Other common struggles for adolescents ==
=== Alcoholism ===
More than 90 percent of all alcoholic drinks consumed by young people are consumed through binge drinking, which can lead to Alcoholism. Alcoholism can affect ones' mental health by being dependent on it, putting drinking before their own classwork. People who consume alcohol before the age of fourteen are more likely to drink more often without thinking about the consequences later on. Students who drink alcohol can also experience consequences such as higher risk of suicide, memory problems, and misuse of other drugs. A 2017 survey found that 30% of high school students have drunk alcohol and 14% of high schoolers have binge drank.

=== Bullying ===
Bullying in schools can cause adverse effects on students. Academic outcomes for bullied youth are typically below normal. Bullying is associated with a lower grade point average (GPA), lower achievement test scores, and lower teacher-rated academic engagement. Students who become victims of bullying can experience difficulties with social-emotional functioning and they have more difficulty making friends. This also causes poor relationships with peers and classmates which can cause them to feel lonely. Feeling like an outcast, feeling lonely, and being shut out of friend groups can cause students to feel isolated, which can cause anxiety and depression. These conditions come with their own unique implications as far as school goes.

=== Suicide ===
According to the California Dept. of Public Health there were 2,210 suicides in 2019 in the US age range of 15-19 and a total of 6,500 suicides from ages 5–25. Some research estimates that among 15-24 year-olds, there are approximately 100-200 suicide attempts for every suicide. Adolescent suicidality may be a product of network positions characterized by either relative isolation or structural imbalance and a growing body of research links social isolation to suicide. Most suicides reported in Ohio from 1963 to 1965 revealed that they tended to be social outcasts (played no sports, had no hobbies, and were not part of any clubs). They also suggested that half of these students were failing or near-failing at the time of their deaths. These periods of failure and frustration lower the individual's self-concept to a point where they have little sense of self-worth. In fact, students who perceive their academic performance as "failing" are three times more likely to attempt suicide than those who perceive their performance to be acceptable. However, academic failure in school is not the only cause of suicide in schools. Bullying, social isolation, and issues at home are all reasons why students commit suicide.

=== Relationships ===
Relationships help in shaping the mental-health of teen during their developing stages. Healthy relationships can provide teens with support, confidence and a sense of belonging, which therefore helps with the reduction of stress and improves their self-esteem. According to the article Relationships and mental health by Dziemianko, and Klaudi relationships that encourage such behaviors can help as comfort source and encourage healthier habits. Unhealthy relationships on the other hand such as those that involve pressure, where there's a lot of conflicts, or jealousy, or poor communication can all lead to depression, anxiety, sadness and feelings of loneliness.

=== Reaching Out For Help ===
The American Psychological Association reports that from 2008 to 2018, a survey showed that 5.8% of American people were not receiving the care they needed for their mental health. According to the survey's results, 12.7% of young people between the ages of 18 and 25 said that their mental health issues weren't addressed. The majority of respondents to the survey stated that cost considerations were one of the primary reasons why their needs weren't met. Students in education often find themselves in difficult situations that require assistance. Data suggests a concerning trend of rising rates of suicidal ideation and self-harm behaviors among college students, pointing to the urgent need for effective prevention and intervention strategies. Solving the mental health crisis in America should not solely fall back onto the schools, but they are definitely a huge part of the solution; according to experts, by bringing treatment to these children, school officials are key in addressing existing problems and preventing further diagnoses in these children. Some ways that we are able to bring mental health solutions to the children include an on-duty counselor or a psychiatrist, both of which would be able to evaluate students and help them with receiving the proper medications. For those who require assistance, it is essential to acknowledge mental health services. According to the poll, 26% of respondents believed they could manage their mental needs without receiving treatment. Many students shy away from the main problem because they think their problems aren't serious enough to warrant assistance. By consuming their thoughts and emotions, students discover that they are increasing their stress and anxiety. In order to encourage students to seek treatment when necessary, educational materials should mention the mental health services that are accessible.

== COVID-19 and mental health ==
=== Early COVID-19 predictions ===
Outbreaks of disease forecast a rise in mental health policies. Increased levels of unemployment and emotional distress during the global COVID-19 pandemic led to and evidenced such as rise in 2020. There were cases of increased isolation and depression rates of the elderly, xenophobia against people of Asian descent, and resulting mental health effects of large-scale quarantine and business closures. Not only is an achievement gap projected for students that undergo the COVID-19 pandemic, but significant repercussions are expected for the mental health and well-being of students in low-income families, since more than half of students utilize reduced-priced or free mental health resources provided by schools. JAMA Pediatrics expects that the global health crisis will worsen pre-existing mental health disorders in students and the number of childhood mental health disorders will increase with the higher prevalence of social isolation and familial income decline due to economic recession.

The Kaiser Family Foundation reported that 56% of Americans have endured at least one negative mental health effect due to stress related to the outbreak. This can surface as increased alcohol and drug use, frequent headaches, trouble sleeping and eating, or short tempers. Additionally, in May 2020, Well Being Trust reported that the pandemic could lead to 75,000 additional "deaths of despair" from overusing drugs and alcohol or suicide from unemployment, social isolation, and general anxiety regarding the virus. Thus, although as of 2020 there are no federal requirements in place, a rise in mental health awareness and approval of policies is expected post-COVID-19.

=== Current COVID-19 effects ===
"The COVID-19 pandemic led to a worldwide lockdown and school closures, which have placed a substantial mental health burden on children and college students. Through a systematic search of the literature on PubMed and Collabovid of studies published January 2020–July 2021, findings of five studies on children and 16 studies on college students found that both groups reported feeling more anxious, depressed, fatigued, and distressed than prior to the pandemic. As a result of COVID-19, children, adolescent, and college students are experiencing long duration of quarantine, physical isolation from their friends, teachers, and extended family members, and are forced to adapt to a virtual way of learning. A two-year study during the pandemic on Greek University students revealed severe prevalence of stress, anxiety, and depression especially during the second year of the pandemic. Due to this unexpected and forced transition, children and college students may not have adequate academic resources, social contact and support, or a learning-home environment, which may lead to a heightened sense of loneliness, distress, anger, and boredom—causing an increase in negative psychological outcomes. Mental health issues may also arise from the disease itself, such as grief from loss of lives, opportunities, and employment."

== Policies in public schools ==
=== United States ===
Concerning U.S. state policies as of 2020, three states have approved mandatory mental health curriculums. In July 2018, New York and Virginia passed legislation that made mental health instruction mandatory in public education. New York has made it mandatory for students from Kindergarten to 12th grade to undergo mental health instruction. After experiencing traumatizing suicidal behavior with his own son, Virginia Senator Creigh Deeds thought it necessary to teach warning signs to 9th and 10th graders so they can look out for the safety of their peers and themselves. The board of education is in charge of deliberating details of the curriculum but the senator is hopeful that teachers will also receive training on warning signs. Even though investment in mental health has never been higher, the state legislature has yet to approve extra funding to implement the curriculum. In July 2019, Florida's board of education made 5 hours of mental health education mandatory for grades 6 through 12, making it the third state to approve such instruction.

Nationally, there has been some effort to increase education on mental health in the public school system. In 2020, the U.S. Department of Education awarded School-Based Mental Health Services grants to 6 state education agencies (SEAs) to increase the number of qualified (i.e., licensed, certified, well-trained, or credentialed) mental health service providers that provide school-based mental health services to students in local educational agencies (LEAs) with demonstrated need. There has been a growing popularity with school-based mental health services in United States public school systems, in which schools have their students covered for mental health care. People, on both the local and federal level, across the states are taking steps to redesign a system that is more favorable for students. This includes focusing on providing mental health services to them.

This concept has the potential to allow students to have access to services that can help them understand and work through any stressors they may face within their schooling, as well as a better chance of intervention for those students who need it.

In a study conducted in 2018 it was found that around 20% of college students in the United States had made attempts at suicide. A report by Healthy Minds in 2021 revealed that 5% of students had reported having planned to commit suicide in the preceding year. There are different kinds of students everywhere. Some might need more support than others, and some might learn at a faster pace than others. It is important to create an inclusive environment for all.

=== Canada ===
In Canada, the Mental Health Strategy highlights the importance of mental health promotion, stigma reduction, and early recognition of mental health problems in schools to be a priority (Mental Health Commission, 2012).

Ontario conducts a survey every year to keep track of how effective policies are for public schools. Administered by People for Education, the 2022-23 annual report provided insight into the lack of mental health support for students and how inaccessible specialists are for not only students, but educators as well. These surveys are useful data in making decisions on how money can be spent on public schools and what policies should or should not be enforced.

Implementing comprehensive school health and post-secondary mental health initiatives that promote mental health and prevention for those at risk was recommended by the Mental Health Commission of Canada.

=== Bhutan ===
In Bhutan, efforts toward developing education began in 1961 thanks to Ugyen Wangchuck and the introduction of the First Development Plan, which provided free primary education. By 1998, 400 schools were established. Students' tuition, books, supplies, equipment, and food were all free for boarding schools in the 1980s, and some schools also provided their students with clothing. The assistance of the United Nations Food and Agriculture Organizations' World Food Programme allowed free midday meals in some primary schools. This governmental assistance is important to note in the country's Gross National Happiness (GNH), which is at the forefront of developmental policies and is the responsibility of the government. Article 9 of the Constitution of Bhutan states that "the state shall strive to promote those conditions that will enable the pursuit of Gross National Happiness."

==== Gross national happiness ====
GNH in Bhutan is based on four principles: sustainable and equitable economic development, conservation of the environment, preservation and promotion of culture, and good governance. Their constitution prescribes that the state will provide free access to public health services through a three-tiered health system which provides preventative, promotive, and curative services. Because of this policy, Bhutan was able to eliminate iodine deficiency disorder in 2003, leprosy in 1997, and achieved childhood immunization for all children in 1991. It became the first country to ban tobacco in 2004, and cases of malaria decreased from 12,591 cases in 1999 to 972 cases in 2009. The elimination of these diseases and the strong push for GNH allows for all people (including adolescents who are provided with many necessary items and free education) to live happier lives than they otherwise may have had.

=== United Kingdom ===
The Department for Education in United Kingdom is working on developing an organizational approach to support mental health and character education. An October 2017 joint report from the Departments for Education and Health outlines this approach with regard to staff training, raising awareness of mental health challenges that children face, and involvement of parents and families in students' mental health. The first wave of the government-led Children and Young People's Mental Health Implementation programme was launched in 2018. 58 mental health support teams were set up in schools and further education colleges to improve mental health in those aged 5 – 18 years. An evaluation on this initial roll-out found general satisfaction with the programme among schools, colleges and the young people who accessed support.

=== Singapore ===
REACH is a program in Singapore that looks to provide interventions for students struggling with mental illness. A quote from the REACH website reads, "The majority of children and adolescents do not suffer from mental illness. However, when a student has been identified, the school counselor, with consultation from the school's case management team, will look into managing the care of the student. When necessary, guidance specialists and educational psychologists from the Ministry of Education will render additional support.

=== Mexico ===
Traditionally, mental health was not considered a part of public health in Mexico because of other health priorities, lack of knowledge about the true magnitude of mental health problems, and a complex approach involving the intervention of other sectors in addition to the public health sector. Among the key documents anticipating the policy change was a report presented by the Mexican Health Foundation in 1995, which opened a very constructive debate. It introduced basic tenets for health improvement, elements for an analysis of the health situation related to the burden of disease approach, and a strategic proposal with concurrent recommendations for reforming the system. Mexico has an extensive legal frame of reference dealing with health and mental health. The objectives are to promote a healthy psychosocial development of different population groups, and reduce the effects of behavioral and psychiatric disorders. This should be achieved through graded and complementary interventions, according to the level of care, and with the coordinated participation of the public, social, and private sectors in municipal, state, and national settings. The strategic lines consider training and qualification of human resources, growth, rehabilitation, and regionalization of mental health service networks, formulation of guidelines and evaluation. All age groups as well as specific sub-populations (indigenous groups, women, street children, populations in disaster areas), and other state and regional priorities are considered.

=== Japan ===
In Japan and China, the approach to mental health is focused on the collective of students, much like the national aims of these Asian countries. Much like in the US, there is much research done in the realm of student mental health, but not many national policies in place to prevent and aid mental health problems students face. Japanese students face considerable academic pressure as imposed by society and school systems. In 2006, Japanese police gathered notes left from students who had committed suicide that year and noted overarching school pressures as the primary source of their problems. Additionally, the dynamic of collective thinking—the centripetal force of Japan's society, wherein individual identity is sacrificed for the functioning benefit of a greater collective—results in the stigmatization of uniqueness. As child psychiatrist Dr. Ken Takaoka explained to CNN, schools prioritize this collectivism, and "children who do not get along in a group will suffer."

=== China ===
Chinese society widely agrees that attending prestigious schools can lead to high-paying careers and long-term happiness for children. Yet, in the pursuit of these objectives, a significant number of Chinese families are currently grappling with the challenge of educational anxiety. The data from the Program of International Student Assessment (PISA, 2018) reveal that Chinese students achieve high global rankings in academics, leading in reading, mathematics, and science. However, their life satisfaction scores, an important measure of mental health, are notably low. This situation indicates a trend where the increasing academic competition not only elevates the financial and time investments in education but also contributes to a rise in extracurricular tutoring and a significant academic workload for students. Several systematic reviews examining the occurrence of depressive symptoms among students in China found that, on average, 17.2% of primary school students and 28.4% of Chinese university students exhibited signs of depression.

In China, the focus on mental well-being of children and adolescents is highlighted in three interconnected policy frameworks: firstly, their mental health is recognized in broader national policies; secondly, it is a key focus within maternal and child health initiatives; and thirdly, specific policies are devoted exclusively to the mental health of this young population.

Studies indicate that mental health promotion programs rank among the most effective efforts within health-promoting school initiatives. Efforts have been made to address academic stress, with recent initiatives aiming to reduce the burden on students and promote a healthier educational environment. In July 2021, the "Double Reduction Policy" was introduced, mandating schools to decrease excessive homework and off-campus training, potentially alleviating academic pressure and enhancing students' psychological well-being.

With China's nine-year compulsory education program, primary schools play a key role in promoting and improving child mental health, serving as ideal venues for delivering related services. According to the 'Work Plan for Mental Health in China (2011–2020)', 85% coverage of mental health education was chosen as a target in urban primary schools and 70% in rural areas by 2015. Additionally, it argued for assessing the prevalence of mental disorders and for increasing awareness of child and adolescent mental health from 30%–40% in 2005 to 80% by 2015. The plan also emphasized the importance of providing accessible information on mental disorder prevention and screening through primary care physicians. As per the revised 'Mental Health Law of the People's Republic of China' that was enacted in May 2013, numerous provisions have been introduced concerning the mental well-being of children and adolescents. Psychologists and counsellors are mandated to be available in schools at all levels to address mental disorders and psychological issues. Furthermore, preschool educational institutions must conduct relevant forms of mental health education. In cases of traumatic events or other stressors, schools are obligated to gather specialists and provide psychological counseling and mental health support to children in need. On December 30, 2016, 22 ministries and commissions, including the National Health and Family Planning Commission and various others, collectively released the 'Guiding Opinions on Strengthening Mental Health Services' ('Opinions'). It stressed the importance of improving the mental health service system in education, advocating for the establishment of counseling centers and the presence of mental health workers across all types of educational institutions, from colleges and universities to preschools.

=== South Korea ===
South Korea has traditionally placed much value on education. As a nation that has a degree of enthusiasm like no other for education has created an environment where children are pressured to study more than ever. When mental health issues affect students there are very few resources available to help students cope. The nation's general view of mental health problems, such as anxiety, depression or thoughts of suicide, is that they are believed to be a sign of personal weakness that could bring shame upon a family if a member would be discovered to have such an illness. This is true if the problem arises in a social, educational or family setting. Rather than perceiving mental health issues as a medical condition and concern requiring treatment especially in students, a majority of Korea's population has perceived them as a cultural stigma. A study found when surveying over 600 Korean citizens from the age of 20-60+ years in 2008, most of the older people, many of whom are parents, shared similar and negative views on mental health issues such as depression. The older adults generally were also found to have a negative view of mental health services, including those offered through the educational system, as they are deeply influenced by the cultural stigma around the topic. This negative view of mental health services in education has provided implications for students who are struggling emotionally, as many do not know what, if any, help might be available in the facilities of education. However, this does not mean no mental health services exist in the world or in the educational setting. The World Health Organization (WHO) in 2006 collected data regarding Korea's mental health system. The goal of collecting this information was to attempt to improve the mental health system and to provide a baseline for monitoring the change. Despite Korea having a low budget for mental health services compared to other developed countries, it has taken steps to create long term mental health plans to advance its national health system such as raising more awareness for mental health, creating communities for students, and removing the cultural stigma around mental health.

== Alleviation and fostering adjustment ==
=== Prevention ===
The pressures of school, extracurricular activities, work and relationships with friends and family can be a lot for an individual to manage and at times can be overwhelming. In order to prevent these overwhelming feelings from turning into a mental health problem, taking measures to prevent these emotions from escalating is essential. School-based programs that help students with emotional-regulation, stress management, conflict resolution, and active coping and cognitive restructuring are a few suggested ways that give students resources that can promote their mental health (Mental Health Commission, 2012).

Research shows that students who receive social-emotional and mental health will have a higher chance of more academic achievements. Since most children spend a large portion of the day at school, about 6 hours, schools are the ideal place for students to receive the services they need. When mental health is not addressed, this can cause issues with causing distractions to fellow students and teachers. A 2020 survey found that 43% of academic researchers were harassed or bullied at work. Many respondents claimed that their work environment hindered research.

According to a 2019 article regarding school social workers, the field of social workers in schools is continuing to grow. In 1996, there were only about 9,000 social workers in schools. This had increased to be between 20,000 and 22,000 social workers. According to the United States Department of Labor, Bureau of Labor Statistics, it is estimated the field will continue to grow from 2016 to 2026 due to the increase of mental health services that are being demanded in schools.

=== Belonging ===
Belonging in the school environment may be the most important and relevant factors affecting students' performance in an academic setting. School-related stress and an increase in academic expectations may increase school-related stress and in turn negatively affect their academic performance. The absence of social acceptance has been shown to lead lowered interest and engagement because students have difficulty sustaining engagement in environments where they do not feel valued and welcome. The feeling of belonging creates a buffer between students and depressive symptoms and lessens the feelings of anxiety in school. Other components of not belonging can also affect students' feeling of belonging, which include not being represented racially, ethnically minority, or lack of first-generation representation in schools.

An issue that is faced in our society today is bullying which can happen at school or even in class. Bullying can cause issues for students such as chemical dependency, physical harm, and a decrease in performance academically. According to the NASP, a large percentage, about 70%-80%, of people have experienced bullying in their school years in which the student could have been the bully, victim, or even the bystander. In order for staff at schools to understand how to notice this as an issue and what to do to resolve it, NASP advocates for guiding principals in how to resolve these issues as well as providing information on available programs.

A 2020 survey by the UK non-profit Ditch The Label found that of those people who had been bullied that year 36% reported depression, 33% had suicidal thoughts, and 27% self-harmed.

== See also ==
- College health
- Effects of stress on memory
- Learning disability
- Mental health day
- Mental health during the COVID-19 pandemic
- Mental health first aid
- Mental health in the workplace
- Mental health of Asian Americans
- Mental Health
- School bullying
- School climate
- Self-help groups for mental health
- Social determinants of mental health
- Teacher burnout
- World Mental Health Day
- Youth mental health crisis
