= Teacher burnout =

Occupational burnout in education

Teacher burnout refers to a situation where an educator experiences occupational burnout, i.e. they are unable to effectively complete their professional responsibilities and tasks as a result of chronic job stress.

According to a survey done in the United Kingdom in 2012, the rate of self-reported stress, depression, and anxiety within teachers was more than double the average rates in any other profession. Some stressors that can cause teacher burnout include school climate and changes in the teaching profession. School administrators can provide relief to educators who may be experiencing mental health struggles. Evidence, however, has been mounting that teacher burnout is actually a depressive condition.

== Causes ==
=== School climate ===
School climate is typically instilled into school systems by those in leadership roles, such as principals and superintendents. Discipline and communication between administrators and their staff heavily impact school climate. Consequently, school climate can influence teachers' engagement and dedication to their work. For example, a warm and welcoming atmosphere encourages teachers to become more involved in their job and remain at their school in the future. However, a negative atmosphere where educators are confronted with constant stressors could lead to teacher burnout and eventually leaving the job.

=== Changes within the profession ===
In 1991, Barry A. Farber in his research on teachers proposed that there are three types of burnout:

- "wearout" and "brown-out", where someone gives up having had too much stress and/or too little reward
- "classic/frenetic burnout", where someone works harder and harder, trying to resolve the stressful situation and/or seek suitable reward for their work
- "underchallenged burnout", where someone has low stress, but the work is unrewarding. "Underchallenged burnout" later came to be known as boreout.

Farber found evidence that the most idealistic teachers who enter the profession are the most likely to suffer burnout.

"Reformation fatigue" can occur when a field of work undergoes change at a rate faster than the worker can keep up with. In the past twenty years, teachers have been confronted with both gradual and abrupt change. For example, while technology has had positive impacts on education, teachers have had to adjust to the way they deliver lessons, communicate with students, post grades, receive assignments, etc. Adjusting to these changes can cause chronic stress in educators who are unfamiliar with the equipment or digital platforms that are now essentially required to do their job.

Furthermore, the COVID-19 pandemic has necessitated abrupt changes in the field of education. Lessons that were intended for in-person classes needed to be modified for online settings and oftentimes shorter periods of time. During this process, teachers also worried about their own and their loved ones' health, had no separation of home and work life, and experienced limited social relief. In a survey about work-related anxiety in the United Kingdom, the percentage of teachers reporting high levels of stress increased from 3 percent in June 2019 to 17 percent in September 2019 for teachers who worked in private schools, and from 6 percent in June 2019 to 19 percent in September 2019 for teachers who worked in state schools. These statistics show the fluctuation of self-reported stress levels for educators during the summer months and into the beginning of the school year.

=== Emotional and Personal Factors ===
- Emotional labor—the hidden work of managing one’s own feelings to support students—often goes unrecognized and under‑resourced, leading to chronic emotional exhaustion.
- Insufficient socioemotional skills and coping strategies can exacerbate stress; teachers with less-developed emotional intelligence report higher burnout levels.
- Personal life stressors—family obligations, health issues, or financial pressures—compound work demands and accelerate burnout.
- Early symptom recognition and self‑awareness can help stem burnout before it deepens; see comprehensive self‑care guide.

=== Systemic and Structural Pressures ===
- Underfunding and large class sizes strain teachers’ capacity to meet student needs, increasing stress and reducing job satisfaction.
- Curriculum mandates, high‑stakes testing, and frequent policy shifts limit professional autonomy and contribute to “reformation fatigue.”
- Lack of job autonomy and leadership support—when teachers have little say in decisions affecting their classroom, burnout rates climb significantly.

== Consequences ==
Teacher burnout begins to affect not only the teacher, but their students as well. Teachers cannot support their students academic, social, and emotional needs completely if they are feeling the effects of burnout. It is not the teacher's responsibility to solely teach, but also to provide motivation and support student wellbeing. This can become a challenge for teachers when their own wellbeing isn't being supported. Due to lack of encouragement, students may feel less of an intrinsic motivation to complete their work, study, and learn. Teachers are even more likely to have negative views of their students due to burnout. In addition, burnout can affect teachers’ mental health and personal lives and in some circumstances, lead to resignation or dismissal. Relationships with family and friends may become strained as a result of burnout.

== Relief ==
Open discussions about mental health issues can be crucial for employees. School districts can foster a positive school climate by giving their teachers the space to openly talk about their struggles and give/receive advice for staying afloat during difficult times. Administrators can cultivate a mentally healthy culture in their schools by creating systems of support, such as periodic meetings where district leaders provide check-ins and teachers can gain social relief from their peers, or storytelling workshops where people can share their experiences. Moreover, district officials can make their faculty aware of signs of mental health struggles so that they could recognize when they or a colleague may need support.

== See also ==
- Bullying in teaching
- Occupational burnout
- Mental health in education
- School climate
- School violence
- Sexual harassment in education
