= Kelly-Ann Allen =

Australian psychologist

- Born: Kelly-Ann Prasad; Adelaide, Australia
- Known for: Belonging, Religion, School Psychology, Positive Psychology

Academic background
- Education: University of Melbourne

Academic work
- Discipline: Psychology, educational and developmental psychology, wellbeing

Kelly-Ann Allen (née Prasad; born in Adelaide) is an Australian educational psychologist and academic. She is a Fellow of the Australian Psychological Society, an Associate Professor in the Faculty of Education at Monash University, Clayton campus, Melbourne, Australia, and an educational and developmental psychologist. Allen gained her PhD in 2014 from the University of Melbourne on the subject of School Belonging which continues to be her main academic focus. Allen is a qualified school psychologist as well as an established academic. Allen has made significant contributions to the field of belonging and school psychology and has published over 170 outputs in these fields. She has gained national and international recognition for the quality of her work and recently was named as one of Australia's top academic researchers.

== Books ==
=== Authored or co-authored ===
- Allen, Kelly-Ann (2021). The Psychology of Belonging. Routledge. ISBN 978-0-367-34752-9.
- Allen, Kelly-Ann; Jimerson, Shane R.; Quintana, Daniel S.; McKinley, Lara (2023). An Academic's Guide to Social Media: Learn, Engage and Belong. Routledge. ISBN 978-1-003-19836-9.
- Allen, Kelly-Ann (2023). The Lonely Little Cactus: A Story About Friendship, Coping and Belonging. Illustrated by Madeleine Griffith. Routledge. ISBN 978-1-032-07368-2.
- Allen, Kelly-Ann; Fleer, Marilyn; McKinley, Lara (2023). Conceptual PlayWorlds for Wellbeing: A Resource Book for the Lonely Little Cactus. Routledge. ISBN 978-1-032-07365-1.
- Allen, Kelly-Ann; Hyde, Chelsea; Berger, Emily; Coyne, Joe; Gindidis, Simone; Wilkinson, Camelia; Morris, Zoe A.; Wurf, Gerald (2023). How to be an Educational and Developmental Psychologist: From University Applications to Entering the Workforce. Routledge. ISBN 978-1-032-36249-6.
- Fleer, Marilyn; Allen, Kelly-Ann; Clerc-Georgy, Anne; Disney, Leigh; Li, Liang; McKliney, Lara; Quinones, Gloria; Rai, Prabhat; Scull, Janet; Suryani, Anne (2024). Why play works: Conceptual playworlds inspiring learning, imagination and creativity in education. Monash University.
- Allen, Kelly-Ann; Fleer, Marilyn; McKinley, Lara (2025). Conceptual PlayWorlds for Belonging A Practical Resource for 'Mia Belongs Here' and 'School is Where We All Belong. Routledge. ISBN 978-1-032-46579-1.
- Wagner, Michael; Allen, Kelly-Ann (2025). Mia Belongs Here: A Story About Family, Home and a Sense of Belonging. Illustrated by Kathryn Kallady. Routledge. ISBN 978-1-003-38238-6.
- Allen, Kelly-Ann; Wagner, Michael (2025). School is Where We All Belong: A Story About Building a Sense of Belonging Outside of Home. Illustrated by Kathryn Kallady. Routledge. ISBN 978-1-032-46577-7.

=== Edited ===
- Allen, Kelly-Ann; Reupert, Andrea; Oades, Lindsay G., eds. (2021). Building Better Schools with Evidence-based Policy: Adaptable Policy for Teachers and School Leaders. Routledge. ISBN 978-1-000-36309-8.
- Allen, Kelly-Ann; Furlong, Michael J.; Vella-Brodrick, Dianne; Suldo, Shannon M., eds. (2022). Handbook of Positive Psychology in Schools: Supporting Process and Practice (3rd ed.). Routledge. ISBN 978-0-367-42082-6.
- Boyle, Christopher; Allen, Kelly-Ann, eds. (2023). Research for Inclusive Quality Education: Leveraging Belonging, Inclusion, and Equity. Springer Nature Singapore. ISBN 978-981-16-5907-2.
