= Belongingness =

Human emotional need

Belongingness is the human emotional need to be an accepted member of a group. Whether it is family, friends, co-workers, a religion, or something else, some people tend to have an inherent desire to belong and be an important part of something greater than themselves. This implies a relationship that is greater than simple acquaintance or familiarity.

Belonging is a strong feeling that exists in human nature. To belong or not to belong is a subjective experience that can be influenced by a number of factors within people and their surrounding environment. A person's sense of belonging can greatly impact their physical, psychological or spiritual well-being.

Roy Baumeister and Mark Leary argue that belongingness is as fundamental for human motivation as it is universal, for the need to belong is found across all cultures and different types of people, and severe consequences may arise if such need remains unfulfilled.

Active listening can help create the feeling of belonging; this is because it enables the ability to respond to another person in an understanding and meaningful way. When the person feels truly heard, especially in a way that promotes unconditional positive regard, they are able to feel a significantly higher sense of belonging and acceptance.

== Psychological needs ==
Abraham Maslow suggested that the need to belong was a major source of human motivation. He thought that it was one of five human needs in his hierarchy of needs, along with physiological needs, safety, self-esteem, and self-actualization. These needs are arranged on a hierarchy and must be satisfied in order. After physiological and safety needs are met an individual can then work on meeting the need to belong and be loved. According to Maslow, if the first two needs are not met, then an individual cannot completely love someone else.

Other theories have also focused on the need to belong as a fundamental psychological motivation. According to Roy Baumeister and Mark Leary, all human beings need a certain minimum quantity of regular, satisfying social interactions. Inability to meet this need results in loneliness, mental distress, and a strong desire to form new relationships. Several psychologists have proposed that there are individual differences in people's motivation to belong. People with a strong motivation to belong are less satisfied with their relationships and tend to be relatively lonely. As consumers, they tend to seek the opinions of others about products and services and also attempt to influence others' opinions.

According to Baumeister and Leary, much of what human beings do is done in the service of belongingness. They argue that many of the human needs that have been documented, such as the needs for power, intimacy, approval, achievement and affiliation, are all driven by the need to belong. Human culture is compelled and conditioned by pressure to belong. The need to belong and form attachments is universal among humans. This counters the Freudian argument that sexuality and aggression are the major driving psychological forces. Those who believe that the need to belong is the major psychological drive also believe that humans are naturally driven toward establishing and sustaining relationships and belongingness. For example, interactions with strangers are potential first steps towards developing non-hostile and more long-term connections which can satisfy one’s attachment needs. Certain people who are socially deprived can exhibit physical, behavioral, and psychological problems, such as stress or instability.

=== Attachments ===
In all cultures, attachments form universally. Social bonds are easily formed, without the need for favorable settings. The need to belong is a goal-directed activity that people try to satisfy with a certain minimum number of social contacts. The quality of interactions is more important than the quantity of interactions. People who form social attachments beyond that minimal amount experience less satisfaction from extra relationships, as well as more stress from terminating those extra relationships. People also effectively replace lost relationship partners by substituting them with new relationships or social environments. For example, individuals with strong family ties could compensate for loneliness at work.

Relationships missing regular contact but characterized by strong feelings of commitment and intimacy also fail to satisfy the need. Just knowing that a bond exists may be emotionally comforting, yet it would not provide a feeling of full belongingness if there is a lack of interaction between the persons. The belongingness hypothesis proposes two main features. First, people need constant, positive, personal interactions with other people. Second, people need to know that the bond is stable, there is mutual concern, and that this attachment will continue. So, the need to belong is not just a need for intimate attachments or a need for connections, but that the perception of the bond is as important as the bond itself. Individuals need to know that other people care about their well-being and love them.

Baumeister and Leary argue that much of the research on group bonds can be interpreted through the lens of belongingness. They argue that plenty of evidence suggests that social bonds are formed easily. In the classic Robber's Cave study, stranger boys were randomly grouped into two different groups and almost immediately, group identification and strong loyalty developed to their specific group. Initially, the two groups were asked to compete with one another, and hostility between the groups ensued. However, when the two groups were combined to form one big group and were given the opportunity to bond by working together to accomplish superordinate goals, behaviors and emotions accommodated quickly to that new group. In an attempt to understand causes of in-group favoritism, researchers formed a group so minimal and insignificant that one would expect that no favoritism would be found, yet in-group favoritism appeared immediately.

Researchers agree that banding together against a threat (the out-group) and sharing rewards are primary reasons groups form and bond so easily. Mere proximity is another powerful factor in relationship formation. Just like babies form attachments with their caregivers, people develop attachments just because they live near one another. This suggests that proximity sometimes overcomes the tendencies to bond with others who are similar to us. Positive social bonds form just as easily under fearful circumstances, such as military veterans who have undergone heavy battle together. This can be explained by either misattribution (interpreting feelings of anxious arousal as feelings of attraction for another person) or reinforcement theory (the presence of another person reduces distress and elicits positive responses). Baumeister and Leary argue that the reinforcement theory explanation provides evidence for the importance of belonging needs because these learned associations create a tendency to seek out the company of others in times of threat. The formation of social attachments with former rivals is a great indicator of the need to belong. Belonging motivations are so strong that they are able to overcome competitive feelings towards opponents.

People form such close attachments with one another that they are hesitant in breaking social bonds. Universally, people distress and protest ending social relationships across all cultures and age spans. Even temporary groups, such as training groups, struggle with the idea that the group may eventually dissolve. The group may have fulfilled their purpose, but the participants want to cling on to the relationships and social bonds that have been formed with one another. The group members make promises individually and collectively to stay in touch, plan for future reunions, and take other steps to ensure the continuity of the attachment. For example, two people may not speak for an entire year, but continue exchanging holiday cards. People do not want to risk damaging a relationship or breaking an attachment, because it is distressing.

People are so hesitant in breaking social bonds that in many cases, they are hesitant to dissolve bad relationships that could be potentially destructive. For example, many women are unwilling to leave their abusive spouses or boyfriends with excuses ranging from liking the abuse to economic self-interests that are more important to them than physical harm. This unwillingness to leave an abusive partner, whether mentally or physically, is another indicator of the power of the need to belong and how reluctant individuals are to break these bonds. Breaking off an attachment causes pain that is deeply rooted in the need to belong.

People experience a range of both positive and negative emotions; the strongest emotions linked to attachment and belongingness. Empirical evidence suggests that when individuals are accepted, welcomed, or included it leads those individuals to feel positive emotions such as happiness, elation, calm, and satisfaction. However, when individuals are rejected or excluded, they feel strong negative emotions such as anxiety, jealousy, depression, and grief. In fact, the psychological pain caused by social rejection is so intense that it involves the same brain regions involved in the experience of physical pain. Both positive and negative reactions in emotion are connected to status of relationship. The existence of a social attachment changes the way one emotionally responds to the actions of a relationship partner and the emotions have the potential to intensify.

Lack of constant, positive relationships has been linked to a large range of consequences. People who lack belongingness are more prone to behavioral problems such as criminality and suicide and suffer from increasing mental and physical illness. Based on this evidence, multiple and diverse problems are caused by the lack of belongingness and attachments. It therefore seems appropriate to regard belongingness and attachments as a need rather than simply a want.

Relationships that are centrally important in the way people think are interpersonal relationships. The belongingness hypothesis suggests that people devote much of their cognitive thought process to interpersonal relationships and attachments. For example, researchers found that people store information in terms of their social bonds, such as storing more information about a marriage partner as opposed to a work acquaintance. People also sort out-group members on the basis of characteristics, traits, and duties, whereas they sort in-group members on person categories. Cognitive processing organizes information by the person they have a connection with as opposed to strangers. Researchers had a group of people take turns reading out loud and they found that they had the greatest recall for the words they personally spoke, as well as for words spoken by dating partners or close friends. There is a cognitive merging of the self with specific people that is followed by the need to belong. Flattering words that are said to a spouse can enhance the self just as positively. People always believe that nothing bad can happen to themselves, and extend that thought to their family and friends.

There is an emotional implication to belongingness in which positive affect is linked to increases in belongingness while negative affect is linked to decreases in belongingness. Positive emotions are associated with forming social attachments, such as the experience of falling in love, as long as the love is mutual. Unrequited love (love without belongingness) usually leads to disappointment whereas belongingness in love leads to joy. Occasions such as childbirth, new employment, and fraternity/sorority pledging are all associated with the formation of new social attachments surrounded by positive emotions. Forming bonds is cause for joy, especially when the bond is given a permanent status, such as a wedding. Weddings signify permanent commitment and complete the social bond by committing to the spouse's need to belong. Positive experiences shared emotions increases attraction with others. Close personal attachments, a rich network of friends and high levels of intimacy motivation are all correlated to happiness in life.

The breaking of social bonds and threats to those bonds are primary sources of negative affect. People feel anxious, depressed, guilty or lonely when they lose important relationships. Social exclusion is the most common cause of anxiety. Anxiety is a natural consequence of being separated from others. Examples include children suffering from separation anxiety from being separated from their mothers. Adults act similarly when their loved ones leave for a period of time. Memories of past rejection and imagining social rejection all elicit negative emotions. Losses of attachments lead directly to anxiety. If people are excluded from social groups, people get anxious, yet the anxiety is removed when they experience social inclusion. Failing to feel accepted can lead to social and general depression. Depression and anxiety are significantly correlated. Social exclusion is also a major cause of jealousy, which is a common reaction when one's relationships are threatened. Jealousy is cross-culturally universal and in all cultures, sexual jealousy is common. It was said earlier that belongingness needs can only truly be met with social contact, but social contact by itself does not shield people against loneliness. Loneliness matters more when there is a lack of intimacy as opposed to lack of contact. Another negative affect is guilt, which is caused to make the other person want to maintain the relationship more, such as paying more attention to that person.

Divorce and death are two negative events that spoil the need to belong. Divorce causes distress, anger, loneliness, and depression in almost everyone. The death of oneself and other people are the most traumatic and stressful events that people can experience. Death can cause severe depression, which is not a reaction to the loss of the loved one, but because there is a loss of the attachment with that other person. For example, a death of a spouse in which there was marriage problems can still elicit in extreme sadness at the loss of that attachment. Death is linked to anxiety and fear of loneliness. The idea of being separated from friends and family, and not the fact that they would no longer exist on this earth, is what brings about this anxiety.

== Evolutionary perspectives ==
One reason for the need to belong is based on the theory of evolution. In the past belonging to a group was essential to survival: people hunted and cooked in groups. Belonging to a group allowed tribe members to share the workload and protect each other. Not only were they trying to ensure their own survival, but all members of their tribe were invested in each other's outcomes because each member played an important role in the group. More recently in Western society, this is not necessarily the case. Most people no longer belong to tribes, but they still protect those in their groups and still have a desire to belong in groups.

The need to belong is rooted in evolutionary history. Human beings are social animals. Humans have matured over a long period of time in dyadic and group contexts. Humans evolved in small groups that depended on close social connections to fulfill survival and reproductive needs. Unlike other species, humans receive most of what they need from their social group rather than directly from his or her natural environment, suggesting that the human strategy for survival depends on belonging. This explains why a large body of evidence suggests that people are happier and healthier when they experience social belonging. In contrast, lacking belonging and being excluded is perceived as painful and has a variety of negative effects including, shame, anger and depression. Because belongingness is a central component of human functioning, social exclusion has been found to influence many behavioral, cognitive, and emotional outcomes. Given the negative consequences of social exclusion and social rejection, people developed traits that function to prevent rejection and encourage acceptance.

== Self-presentation ==
To be accepted within a group, individuals may convey or conceal certain parts of their personalities. This is known as self-presentation. Self-presentation, or impression management, attempts to control images of the self in front of audiences. It is a conscious and unconscious goal-directed action done to influence audiences to perceive the actor as someone who belongs. Certain aspects of one's personality may not be seen as desirable or essential to the group, so people try to convey what they interpret as valuable to the group.

Self-presentation is frequently used in social media. It has been shown that those who use a strategic self-presentation style in social media versus a more authentic self-presentation style when considering their weaker friendships tend to be happier and feel like they have successfully fulfilled their relationship maintenance goals. Additionally, it has been found that self-presentation in social media highly predicts an individual's sense of belongingness and social support.

== Group membership ==
Individuals join groups with which they have commonalities, whether it is sense of humor, style in clothing, socioeconomic status, or career goals. In general, individuals seek out those who are most similar to them. People like to feel that they can relate to someone and those who are similar to them give them that feeling. People also like those that they think they can understand and who they think can understand them.

=== Social connections ===
The desire to form and maintain social bonds is among the most powerful human motives. If an individual's sense of social connectedness is threatened, their ability to self-regulate suffers. Social relationships are important for human functioning and well-being therefore, research on how social relationships affect people's personal interests and motivated behavior has been a focus of numerous studies. Walton, Cohen, and Spencer for example, believed that a mere sense of social connectedness (even with people who were unfamiliar) can cause one to internalize the goals and motivations of others. By doing so, this shapes people's motivated behavior suggesting achievement motivation and one's self-identity are highly sensitive to minor cues of social connection. Mere belonging is defined as an entryway to a social relationship, represented by a small cue of social connection to an individual or group. Social belonging is a sense of relatedness connected to a positive, lasting, and significant interpersonal relationship. While mere belonging is a minimal or even chance social connection, social belonging factors are characterized as social feedback, validation, and shared experiences. Sharing common goals and interests with others strengthens positive social bonds and may enhance feelings of self-worth.

In another study, Walton and Cohen examined stigmatization and its link to belonging uncertainty. Their belonging uncertainty idea suggests that in academic and professional settings, members of socially stigmatized groups are more uncertain of the quality of their social bonds. Therefore, they feel more sensitive to issues of social belonging. They believe in domains of achievement, belonging uncertainty can have large effects on the motivation of those challenging with a threatened social identity.

=== Conformity ===
Group membership can involve conformity. Conformity is the act of changing one's actions, attitudes, and behaviors to match the norms of others. Norms are unsaid rules that are shared by a group. The tendency to conform results from direct and indirect social pressures occurring in whole societies and in small groups. There are two types of conformity motivations known as informational social influence and normative social influence. Information social influence is the desire to obtain and form accurate information about reality. Information social influence occurs in certain situations, such as in a crisis. This information can be sought out by other people in the group or experts. If someone is in a situation where they do not know the right way to behave, they look at the cues of others to correct their own behavior. These people conform because group interpretations are generally more accurate than individual interpretations. Normative social influence is the desire to obtain social approval from others. Normative social influence occurs when one conforms to be accepted by members of a group, since the need to belong is in our human desire. When people do not conform, they are less liked by the group and may even be considered deviant. Normative influence usually leads to public compliance, which is fulfilling a request or doing something that one may not necessarily believe in, but that the group believes in.

According to Baumeister and Leary, group conformity can be seen as a way to improve one's chances of being accepted by a social group; thus is serves belongingness needs. People often conform to gain the approval of others, build rewarding relationships, and enhance their own self-esteem. Individuals are more likely to conform to groups who describe out-group members with stereotype traits, even though don't publicly express their agreement. People desire to gain approval so they conform to others. The beliefs held by others and how we react to those beliefs is often reliant on our view of the amount of agreement for those beliefs. Researchers are interested in exploring informational and normative motivational influences to conform on majorities and minorities. Objective consensus theory suggests that majority influence of a group is informational, while conversion theory views it as normative. Normative influences may be the underlying motivations behind certain types of conformity; however, researchers believe that after time, informational influences such as confidence in the accuracy of one's intergroup norms is positively correlated with distinguished level of compromise.

Outside the conscious mind, a type of conformity is behavioral mimicry, otherwise known as the chameleon effect. Behavioral mimicry is when individuals mimic behaviors such as facial expressions, postures, and mannerisms between other individuals. Researchers found that individuals subconsciously conformed to the mannerisms of their partners and friends and liked these partners more who mirrored them. This is important in regard to rapport building and forming new social relationships-we mirror the behaviors we are supposed to, to get to where we want to belong in the group. People are motivated to conform to gain social approval and enhance and protect their own self-esteems. However, people who wish to combat conformity and fight that need to belong with the majority group can do so by focusing on their own self-worth or by straying from the attitudes and norms of others. This can establish a sense of uniqueness within an individual. Yet, most individuals keep positive assessments of themselves and still conform to valued groups.

=== Self-regulation ===
When our belongingness needs are not met, Wilkowski and colleagues (2009) suggest that self-regulation is used to fulfill one's need to belong. Self-regulation is defined as the process of regulating oneself, or changing one's behavior, to manage short-term desires according to the self-regulation theory. Self-regulation can occur in many different ways. One of these ways uses other individual's gaze(s) as a reference to understand how attention should be divided. This effect is especially seen within individuals that have low levels of self-esteem. Interpersonal acceptance is not met in individuals with low self-esteem, which prompts them to self-regulate by looking to others for guidance with regards to where to focus attention. Belongingness contributes to this level of self-esteem. Baumeister, Dewall, Ciarocco, and Twenge (2005) found that when people are socially excluded from a group, self-regulation is less likely to be than those who have a heightened sense of belonging. For example, participants were told that the other people in the study did not want to work with them and as a consequence they would have to complete a task on their own. Later, those participants were offered a plate of cookies. The participants that were told that nobody in the group wanted to work with them took more cookies than those who were not told this information, which provides evidence that a lack of belongingness inhibits people's ability to self-regulate. Self-regulation includes impulse control and allows one to manage short-term impulses and have a heightened sense of belongingness within an ingroup. An ingroup is a social group in which a person psychologically defines themselves as being a member of that specific group. By being a part of this group, one has a better ability to self-regulate.

=== Peer networks ===
As the span of relationships expands from childhood into adolescence, a sense of peer group membership is likely to develop. Adolescent girls have been found to value group membership more and are more identified with their peer groups than boys. Adolescent girls tend to have a higher number of friends than boys. They expect and desire more nurturing behavior from their friends. Girls experience more self-disclosure, more empathy, and less overt hostility compared to boys. A study found that girls use ruminative coping, which involves perseverating on the negative feelings and the unpleasant situations associated with problems. Boys on the other hand, tend to be less intimate and have more activity based friendships. Boys do not benefit as much as girls from feelings of belonging that are a product of enduring and close friendships. They are less vulnerable to the emotional distress that is likely to accompany high levels of co-rumination and disclosure.

Various peer groups approve of varying activities and when individuals engage in approved activities, the peer group positively reinforces this behavior. For example, allowing the individual to become part of the group or by paying more attention to the individual is a positive reinforcement. This is a source of motivation for the individual to repeat the activity or engage in other approved activities. Adolescents have also been observed to choose friendships with individuals who engage in similar activities to those that they are involved in. This provides the individual with more opportunities to engage in the activity therefore the peer group may influence how often the individual engages in the activity. To feel a sense of belonging and fit in, adolescents often conform to activities of a particular group by participating in the same activities as members of the peer group.

Newman and colleagues found three different aspects of adolescents' perceptions of group membership: peer group affiliation, the importance of peer group membership and a sense of peer group belonging to behavior problems in adolescence. To capture an adolescent's self-perception of group affiliation one may ask an adolescent to identify themselves as a member of a group or discuss whether they belong in a group. An affective aspect of group belongingness includes feelings of being proud of one's group and being a valued group member. The affective nature of a sense of group belonging has been found to be the most internally consistent. It is important to find out how important it is for an adolescent to be a member of a group because not all adolescents are equally concerned about being part of a group. Those who strongly desire to be in a peer group and do not experience a sense of group belonging are expected to have the greatest social distress and are likely to report the most behavior problems.

=== Schooling ===
A sense of belonging to a social peer group can enhance students' academic achievement. Group membership in early adolescence is associated with greater interest in and more enjoyment of school, while those who are not part of such social groups tend to be less engaged with school. Among middle school and high school students, multiple studies have found a link between a more positive sense of belonging and better academic motivation, lower rates of school dropout, better social-emotional functioning, and higher grade point average. At a college level, a better sense of belonging has been linked to perceived professor caring and greater involvement in campus organizations. In a study exploring associations between a sense of school belonging and academic and psychological adjustment, Pittman and Richmond found that college students who reported a greater sense of belonging at a college level, were doing better academically and felt more competent scholastically but also had a higher self-worth and lower levels of externalizing problems. However, students who were having problems with their relationships with friends, were found to experience more internalizing behaviors and feel less connected to the college.

Schools are important developmental contexts for children and adolescents, and influence their socio-emotional and academic development. One approach used to study naturally occurring peer groups is the social cognitive mapping (SCM). The SCM strategy asks students in a peer system, for example in a classroom, to identify which class members they have observed “hanging out” together. Therefore, determining patterns of observed social affiliations. Interactions and associations within peer networks theorize experience validation, acceptance, and affirmation of early adolescents in schools. The sense of connection within a classroom has been defined as having a sense of classroom belonging. Meaning, students feel they are being valued accepted, included and encouraged by others in the classroom setting. They perceive themselves to be an important part of the setting and activity of the class.

Goodenow and Grady (1993) define school belonging as "the extent to which students feel personally accepted, respected, included, and supported by others in the school social environment" (p 80). School belonging is considered to be a complex multidimensional construct. In much of the research to date, school connectedness has also been used to describe 'school belonging'. Whilst some scholars believe the terms can be used interchangeably, others construe school belonging as something different.

School belonging has been operationalized by the Psychological Sense of School Membership (PSSM) scale. A sense of school belonging has been associated with greater overall well being and happiness, as well as outcomes related to academic achievement.

There are a number of similar concepts centered around school belonging, including school bonding, student engagement, school attachment, school community, school climate, orientation to school, and school connectedness. The inconsistent use of terminology has meant that research into school belonging has been somewhat disjointed and weakened.

School belonging is a student's attachment to their school. Student engagement was explored by Finn in the two-dimensional model, conceptualizing engagement as having two components – participation and identification. Participation refers to behavior, whilst identification relates to affect or a sense of belonging. While school attachment involves a student's connection to school, school community incorporates belonging, meaning that in order to be a part of any community (including a school community), a person first needs to have feelings of belonging

Blum and Libbey characterize school connectedness as a student's perception that teachers, along with other adults in the school community, show a concern for the pupils' learning, pay attention to who the student is as an individual, and also have high academic expectations. Furthermore, school connectedness involves a student having a sense of safety at school as well as positive student-teacher relationships.

Despite the slight differences in meaning, these terms commonly include three aspects: they refer to school-based relationships and experiences, they involve the relationship between students and teachers, and they include a student's general feelings about school as a whole.

A large number of variables have been found to be significantly associated with school belonging. This has made it difficult to present a theoretical model of school belonging. Allen and colleagues (2018) conducted a comprehensive meta-analysis and uncovered 10 themes that influence school belonging during adolescence in educational settings:

- Academic motivation
- Emotional stability
- Personal characteristics
- Parent support
- Teacher support
- Peer support
- Gender, race and ethnicity
- Extracurricular activities
- Environmental/school safety

The meta-analysis found that teacher support and positive personal characteristics are the strongest predictors of school belonging.

Whilst theories pertaining to general ‘belongingness' can also be applied to school belonging, theories of belonging generally imply that belonging comes about because an individual is motivated to meet the fundamental need to belong and to achieve meaningful social relations. However, school belonging is slightly different. School belonging is affected by the school's organisational culture as well as a student's relationships with others and personal characteristics. Schools can help students to develop a sense of belonging because they are in a position to develop social networks and influence policy in practice that is conducive to enhancing student belonging.

The fact that school belonging, by its very nature, is affected by the wider environment, it is consistent with Bronfenbrenner's ecological framework for human development, and the subsequent bio-ecological framework. These frameworks put forward the theory that children's development takes place within the systems in society, and that these systems interact. Every child is at the center of multiple levels of influence. It has been argued that a social-ecological lens is the most adequate lens with which to view the construct of school belonging, given the large number of variables at play, and also the unique nature of school belonging for both the individual and the school.

At school, students are a part of a greater whole influenced by both formal and informal groupings, and overarching systems that are common and typically represented within all schools. Thus, school belonging can be conceptualized as a multi-layered, socio-ecological phenomena, consisting of several interacting layers. This is depicted in the Socio-ecological Model of School Belonging depicted by Allen, Vella-Brodrick, and Waters (2016) in the Figure below.

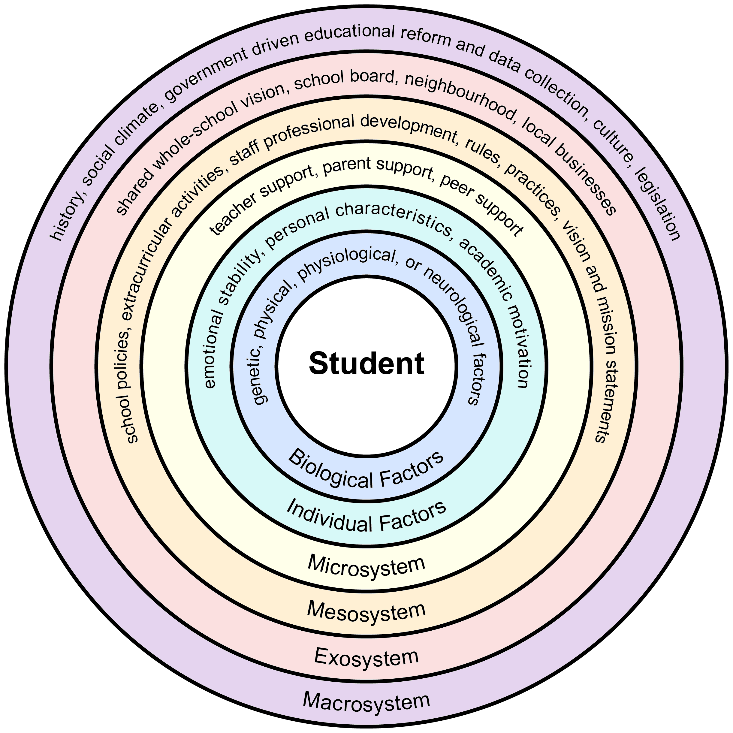
The socio-ecological framework of school belonging by Allen, Vella-Brodrick and Waters (2016)

The innermost layer of the construct is the individual level. This describes the unique student characteristics that contribute to the sense of belonging, including personality and mental health. The micro-system refers to network an individual has that are informal, such as family, friends, teachers, and peers with whom the student interacts with. The mesosystem refers to organisational factors, including school resources, processes, policies, rules and practices. The exosystem refers to the broader school community. Finally, the macro-system involves the legislation, history and social climate of a society. This socio-ecological framework has been developed from empirical studies, and provides schools with a thorough direction in which to foster school belonging.

Given that school belonging is largely about perception, social belonging interventions such as those suggested by Walton and Brady have therefore been found to be useful. They argue that these interventions provide students with an adaptive lens with which to make sense of adversities in school. For minority students, challenges at school can give rise to feelings of non-belonging.

One such social intervention described by Walton and Brady sees stories used, whereby difficulties at school are portrayed as a normal part of education. Rather than attributing challenges as a sign that one doesn't belong, the stories acknowledge group-based difficulties, but show how these experiences are not necessarily a barrier to ultimately belonging and succeeding.

One group that may have the feelings of non-belonging that challenges can lead to, is those of a racial minority. The students who are from minority groups may attribute challenges – both academic and otherwise – to their racial identity. Social support is essential for improving belonging, most especially for students from minority backgrounds for whom acceptance by peers, teachers and parents is an important behavior of pro-social behavior and a positive attitude towards school.

=== Workplace ===
The need to belong is especially evident in the workplace. Employees want to fit in at work as much as students want to fit in at school. They seek the approval and acceptance of leaders, bosses, and other employees. Charismatic leaders are especially known to show off organizational citizenship behaviors such as helping and compliance if they feel a sense of belongingness with their work group. Researchers found that charisma and belongingness increased cooperative behavior among employees. Charismatic leaders influence followers by bringing awareness to the collective unit and strengthening the feeling of belonging, and that enhances employees' compliance. Organizational citizenship behaviors are employee activities that benefit the collective group without the individual gaining any direct benefit. Helping is a huge component of organizational citizenship behaviors because helping involves voluntarily assisting others with problems that are work-related and preventing other issues from arising. Task performance is enhanced and supported when the acts of helping in a work environment are established and evident. Charismatic leaders set a striking example for the way to organization should behave by reinforcing certain rules and values for the organization. These self-confident leaders inspire their followers to exceed expectations for the collective group instead of their own self-interest. This in turn gives employees an identity with which to belong. Studies indicate that belongingness is a crucial factor in understanding DEI efficacy in the workplace.

A sense of belongingness increases a person's willingness to assist others in the group by the group rules. Belongingness and group membership encourages social groups with motivation to comply, cooperate, and help. Cohesive work groups show more consideration, report positive relationships within the group and elicits more organizational citizenship behaviors. Also, an already cohesive and collective group makes people more inclined to comply with the rules of the workplace. Some people help each other in return for a future expected favor; however, most workings help because it is the “right” thing to do or because they like their leaders so much and wish to express this likeness. People are more receptive to a leader who provides a clear sense of direction and inspiration with the promise of a better future. Workers who feel more isolated in the workplace feel the need to belong even more than those who are not isolated because they are missing that collective feeling of unity. A workplace functions better as a collective whole.

== Acceptance/rejection ==
The need to belong is among the most fundamental of all personality processes. Given the negative consequences of social rejection, people developed traits that function to encourage acceptance and to prevent rejection. But if the need to belong evolved to provide people with a means of meeting their basic needs for survival and reproduction based on evolutionary experiences, thwarting the need to belong should affect a variety of outcomes. Because it strikes at the core of human functioning, people respond very strongly to social exclusion.

Both interpersonal rejection and acceptance are psychologically powerful events. Feeling disliked, excluded, unappreciated, or devalued can stir up negative emotions in an individual. Some of these negative emotions include a lower self-esteem, aggressive actions and antisocial behavior. However, believing you are liked, included, appreciated, or valued elicits feelings of higher self-esteem and confidence boosts. A different number of events can lead individuals to feel accepted versus rejected. We can simply see the power of interpersonal acceptance and rejection when accepted vs. ostracized by a group, adored vs. abandoned by a romantic partner, or elected vs. defeated in an election.

However, in all examples, people's feelings begin from perceived relational evaluation. Perceived relational evaluation is the degree to which you perceive others value having a relationship with you. You feel more accepted if another person or group regards your relationship with them as real and as important to them as it is to you. If they consider the relationship unimportant, you feel rejected and respond negatively.

In a series of experiments, Buckley, Winkel, and Leary found that the effects of rejection are more potent than the effects of acceptance because negative feelings can cause more feelings of hurt and pain, which in turn can lead to aggression and negative behaviors. They also found people's reactions to extreme and moderate rejection were similar, suggesting that once one has been rejected by an individual or group, the severity of the rejection is less important

=== Procedural justice ===
Procedural justice, in terms of belongingness, according to van Prooijen and colleagues (2004), is the process by which people judge their level of belongingness in terms of their ability to contribute to a group. Members of a highly inclusive group show a higher level of procedural justice, meaning that individuals that experience high levels of inclusion respond in a more extreme manner to decisions allocated by members of their ingroup than those that are handed down from members of an outgroup. In other words, a person is more likely to believe and support fairness decisions made by members of an ingroup in which they feel like they are a part of, compared to an ingroup in which they do not feel as strongly connected. De Cremer and Blader (2006) found that when people feel a heightened sense of belongingness, they process information about procedural justice in a more careful and systematic way. This means that when people feel like they belong, they are more likely to examine procedural justice issues in a more thorough manner than if they do not feel like they belong.

=== Fairness ===
Fairness principles are applied when belongingness needs are met. Van Prooijen and colleagues (2004) found that fairness maintains an individual's sense of inclusion in social groups. Fairness can be used as an inclusion maintenance tool. Relationships are highly valued within groups, so members of those groups seek out fairness cues so they can understand these relationships. De Cremer and colleagues (2013) suggest that individuals with a high need to belong care more about procedural fairness information and therefore pay closer attention to incoming information. Furthermore, Cornelis, Van Hiel, De Cremer and Mayer (2013) propose that leaders of a group are likely to be more fair when they are aware that the followers of the group have a high need to belong versus a low need to belong. This means that a leader who is aware that people in their group are motivated to adhere to group values is more fair. Leaders are also more fair in congruence with the amount of empathy they feel for followers. Empathetic leaders are more likely to pay attention to differences among followers, and to consider a follower's belongingness needs when making decisions. In addition, Cornelis, Van Hiel, & De Cremer (2012) discovered that leaders are more fair in granting their followers voice when the leader is aware that the follower has a high need to belong. This occurs because of the attraction a leader feels to the follower and to the group. Leaders that are attracted to their followers and to the group are motivated by the follower's need to belong to allow them a greater voice in the group.

== Culture ==
In all cultures, the need to belong is prevalent. Although there are individual differences in the intensity and strength of how people express and satisfy the need, it is really difficult for culture to eradicate the need to belong. Collectivist countries are also more likely to conform and comply with the majority group than members in individualistic societies. Conformity is so important in collectivist societies that nonconformity can represent deviance in Circum-Mediterranean cultures, yet represent uniqueness in Sinosphere culture. Even early civilizations considered both exile and death as equal punishments. Individuals in other countries strive to belong so much that being exiled or shunned from their society is the biggest dishonor.

Motivation to belong varies throughout different cultures, and can affect student achievement in distinct ways. In studies comparing fifteen year old students from 31 countries, the differences between Eastern and Western cultures were apparent. The study is in the perspective of dividing these countries into two groups. The study argues that Asian (eastern) cultures are collectivist, while Western cultures are more individualistic. In Western cultures, peer influence is more predominant while in Eastern cultures, they are more heavily influenced by their families. In a classroom setting, children from Eastern cultures are more competitive, giving them less of a drive to belong among their peers. These children have a great sense of motivation to excel and to do better than those around them which makes their needs for belongingness in a school setting less favorable. While in Western cultures, being so highly impacted by their peers, it gives them less of a drive to be competitive towards them.

Studies have shown that Eastern and Western cultures continue to have one of the largest achievement gaps between them, with Eastern cultures outscoring the Western. It can be hypothesized that the competitive, individualistic drive found in the classroom in Eastern cultures leads to more success. Furthermore, belongingness in Western cultures may have the potential to inhibit classroom success. However, not all cultures respond to belongingness in the same way due to the many variations between cultures.

Furthermore, stigmas can create a global uncertainty about the quality of an individual's social bonds in academic and professional areas. Walton and Cohen conducted two experiments that tested how belonging uncertainty undermines the achievement and motivation of people whose racial group is negatively characterized in academic settings. The first experiment had students believe that they might have a few friends in a field of study. White students were unaffected by this however, black students who were stigmatized academically displayed a drop in potential and sense of belonging. This response of minority students happens because they are aware that they are underrepresented and stigmatized therefore they perceive their worlds differently. Their second experiment was set up as an intervention that was designed to de-racialize the meaning of hardship in college by focusing hardships and doubts as a commonality among 1st year students rather than due to race. What their findings suggest is that majority students may benefit from an assumed sense of social belonging.

== Behavior and social problems ==
Belongingness, also referred to as connectedness, has been established as a strong risk/predictive factor for depressive symptoms. There is growing evidence that the interpersonal factor of belongingness is strongly associated with depressive symptoms. The impression of low relational value is consciously experienced as reduced self-esteem. Reduced self-esteem is a fundamental element of depressive symptoms. According to these views, belongingness perceptions have a direct effect upon depressive symptoms due to innate neurological mechanisms. A number of studies have confirmed a strong link between belongingness and depressive symptoms using the Sense of Belonging Instrument-Psychological measurement. This measurement scale contains 14 items that invoke the social world—for example, “I don't feel there is any place I really fit in this world.” The SOBI-P is intended to measure a general sense of belonging.

Group membership has been found to have both negative and positive associations with behavior problems. Gender differences have been consistently observed in terms of internalizing and externalizing behavior problems. Girls reported more internalizing behaviors such as depression, and boys reported more externalizing problems. However, by providing a sense of security and peer acceptance, group membership may reduce the tendency to develop internalizing problems such as depression or anxiety. A lack of group membership is associated with behavior problems and puts adolescents at a greater risk for both externalizing and internalizing problems However, the need to belong may sometimes result in individuals conforming to delinquent peer groups and engaging in morally dubious activities, such as lying or cheating.

=== Depression ===
Humans have a profound need to connect with others and gain acceptance into social groups. When relationships deteriorate or when social bonds are broken, people have been found to suffer from depressive symptoms. Having a greater sense of belonging has been linked to lower levels of loneliness and depression. Although feeling disconnected from others and experiencing a lack of belonging may negatively affect any individual, those who are depressed may be more vulnerable to negative experiences of belonging. Due to the importance of social experiences to people's well-being, and to the etiology and maintenance of depression, it is vital to examine how well-being is enhanced or eroded by positive and negative social interactions in such clinical populations.

When people experience positive social interactions, they should feel a sense of belonging. However, depressed people's social information-processing biases make them less likely to recognize cues of acceptance and belonging in social interactions. For example, in a laboratory study using information-processing tasks assessing attention and memory for sad, physically threatening, socially threatening, and positive stimuli, clinically depressed people were found to show preferential attention to sad faces, emotion words, and adjectives. Depressed people displayed biases for stimuli concerned with sadness and loss.

People who are depressed often fail to satisfy their need for belonging in relationships and therefore, report fewer intimate relationships. Those who are depressed appear to induce negative affect in other individuals, which consequently elicits rejection and the loss of socially rewarding opportunities. Depressed people are less likely to feel a sense of belonging and are more likely to pay attention to negative social interactions. Research has found that depressive symptoms may sensitize people to everyday experiences of both social rejection and social acceptance.

=== Suicide ===
Numerous studies have indicated that low belonging, acquired ability to self-injure, and burdensomeness are associated with suicidal behaviors. A recent theoretical development: interpersonal theory of suicidal behavior, offers an explanation for the association between parental displacement and suicidal behavior. Thomas Joiner, who recently proposed an interpersonal theory of suicide, suggests that two elements must be present for suicidal behavior to occur. The first element is the desire for suicide and the second is the acquired capability for suicide. In turn, the desire for suicide, is broken into two components: thwarted belongingness and perceived burdensomeness. Together these two components create a motivational force for suicidal behavior. Specifically speaking of adolescent suicidal behavior, the theory proposes that suicidal behavior is a result of individuals having a desire for death and the acquired ability to self-inflict injuries. Increased acquired ability refers to a lack of pain response during self-injury, which has been found to be linked to the number of suicide attempts in a lifetime.

Displacement from parents includes events such as abandonment of the adolescent, divorce, or death of a parent. Parental relationships are a representation of belonging for adolescents because parents may be particularly important for providing the stable and caring relationships that are a fundamental component of belonging. Relationships between parents and adolescents that are positive have been found to be a protective factor that reduces the risk of suicidal behavior in adolescents. Connectedness with parents such as closeness between parent and child and the perceived caring of parents, has been associated with lower levels of past suicide attempts and ideation. Another protective factor found against adolescent suicide attempts was higher levels of parental involvement.

According to Baumeister and Leary, belongingness theory proposes that the desire for death is caused by failed interpersonal processes. Similar to Joiner, one is a thwarted sense of belonging due to an unmet need to belong and the other process being a sense that one is a burden on others. They argue that all individuals have a fundamental need to belong. This need to belong is only met if an individual has frequent, positive interactions with others and feels cared about by significant others. The concept of low belonging suggested by interpersonal theory of suicidal behavior is most relevant to parental displacement and adolescent suicidal behavior because it is likely that parental displacement would affect perceived belonging of adolescents. It was found that adolescents who averaged at about the age of 16, who experienced both low levels of belonging and displacement had the highest risk for suicide. Parental displacement would disrupt the parent-adolescent relationship and consequently would diminish both the frequency and quality of interactions between the two, reducing the adolescent's sense of belonging.

A study conducted on suicide notes, examined the frequency of themes of thwarted belongingness and perceived burdensomeness in samples of suicide notes. The study of suicide notes has been a useful method for examining the motivations of suicides. This research is limited due to the small proportion of completed suicides that actually leave notes. This specific study explored the extent to which the content in the suicide notes reflected thwarted belongingness and perceived burdensomeness. They also examined the extent to which these two themes were found in the same note. This study found that suicide notes did not significantly support the hypothesis that perceived burdensomeness and thwarted belongingness, combined with acquired capability to cause suicidal behavior. There was no strong support for the relevance of perceived burdensomeness and thwarted belongingness as motivations for suicide. They did, however, find that the suicide notes of women more frequently contained the theme of perceived burdensomeness and suicide notes of younger people more frequently contained thwarted belongingness.

== See also ==
- In-group and out-group
- Positional good
- School Belonging
- Self-determination theory § Relatedness
- Sense of community
- Social cohesion
- Social integration
- Status symbol
