= Anti-bully Act 2026 =

Anti-bullying law in Malaysia

Parliament of Malaysia
- Long title: An Act to provide for a specific mechanism to address complaint of bully, to prevent and manage bullying cases in the educational institution and other institution, to provide for the establishment of the Tribunal for Anti-bully, to raise awareness of bully and prevention of bully and to provide for related matters.
- Citation: Act 876
- Territorial extent: Malaysia
- Passed by: Dewan Rakyat
- Passed: 3 December 2025
- Passed by: Dewan Negara
- Passed: 16 December 2025
- Royal assent: 13 January 2026
- Commenced: 1 March 2026 — Part I and II, Sections 25 to 29, 31 [P.U. (B) 75/2026] 16 June 2026 — Remainder of the Act [P.U. (B) 209/2026]

Legislative history

Initiating chamber: Dewan Rakyat
- Bill title: Anti-Bully Bill 2025
- Bill citation: D.R.41/2025
- Introduced by: Azalina binti Othman Said - Minister in the Prime Minister's Department (Law and Institutional Reform)
- First reading: 1 December 2025
- Second reading: 3 December 2025
- Third reading: 3 December 2025

Revising chamber: Dewan Negara
- Bill title: Anti-Bully Bill 2025
- Bill citation: D.R.41/2025
- Member(s) in charge: Azalina binti Othman Said - Minister in the Prime Minister's Department (Law and Institutional Reform)
- First reading: 8 December 2025
- Second reading: 16 December 2025
- Third reading: 16 December 2025

Keywords
- Bullying, Harassment, Children, Education, Schools, Tribunal
- Status: In force

Anti-bully Act 2026 (Malay: Akta Antibuli 2026) is a Malaysian law that establish the mechanisms of addressing, handling and preventing bullying cases of children below 18 years old, or students of any age in a school or educational institution in Malaysia.

This Act of Parliament requires government bodies that operate educational institutions to provide clear procedures, guidelines and training on the prevention and management of bullying cases. All public and private educational institutions were also required to establish a dedicated committee to oversee the prevention and management of bullying cases in their respective school or institution.

A Tribunal for Anti-bully was also established under the Act to hear civil complaints over bullying cases, which can order the respondent to issue an apology, to attend rehabilitation session, or instruct their parents to undergo parenting support classes, or award up to RM250,000 of compensation to victims of bullying. This tribunal however does not hear bullying cases that amount to criminal offence, as it is under the jurisdiction of ordinary court.

== Background ==
The passing of this Act was partly attributed to a number of high-profile bullying cases that have occurred several years prior, such as the death of Zara Qairina in 2025.

The bill for the Act was first tabled to the Dewan Rakyat on 1 December 2025 for its first reading, and was passed by the said lower house on 3 December.

During the debate on the bill in the lower house, law minister Azalina Othman Said said that this law is mainly preventitive in nature. She also reveals that the government may broaden the scope of this Act in the future to cover bullying cases for adults aged 18 years or above.

The bill was then passed by the Dewan Negara on 16 December and received royal assent on 13 January 2026. On 23 January 2026, the Act was gazetted, with Part I and II, sections 25 till 29, and section 31 came into force on 1 March the same year.

On 24 April, Azalina revealed that the Tribunal for Anti-bully established under the Act will be based at the Asian International Arbitration Centre (AIAC) building, while its operations will be divided into six different zones, namely northern, southern, east coast, central, Sabah and Sarawak. An online complaint system will also be setup. Additionally, the Prime Minister's Department's Legal Affairs Division (BHEUU) has received over 100 applications for positions in the tribunal.

On 19 May, Azalina said that the tribunal will be officially operational on 16 June, which will operate both physically and virtually. She also revealed that the president and deputy president of the tribunal have also begun their duties a day prior.

On 16 June, the whole Act officially came into effect, with the newly launched tribunal being led by its first president Nurul Husna Awang and deputy president Gan Chee Keong, who are Sessions Court judge and ex-senior federal counsel respectively. The tribunal is also comprised with 56 other members from various fields. The tribunal proceedings can also be held either physically or online, or outside of its AIAC headquarters at schools or legal aid department offices.

== Legal provisions ==
=== Definitions ===
==== Bully ====
Under section 3 of this Act, "bully" is defined as any willful act directed at a victim by any means, either done repeatedly or in a single severe incident, which caused physical, psychological, or social harm to the victim. This includes:

- physical harm to the victim or his belongings
- abusive, threatening, or demeaning language that causes harm to victim's psychological wellbeing
- social isolation, reputational damage, or creation of hostile environment for the victim
- humiliation or discrimination on the basis of sex, race, religion or disability
- cyberbullying

==== Victim ====
According to section 2 of this Act, only the following categories of person can be considered as "victim" in a bullying case, which are:

- any child under the age of 18 years, or
- students of any age in an educational institution, or
- any child placed in a place of safety, place of refuge or correctional institution (including Henry Gurney School) under the Child Act 2001

However law minister Azalina has indicated the government may enlarge the scope of this Act in the future to cover adults aged 18 years or above as well, and the current form of this legislation will serve as a testing ground of its effectiveness in combating bullying.

==== Educational institution ====
According to section 2 and First Schedule of the Act, "educational institution" that are subjected to this Act are:

1. Government educational institutions
2. Government-aided educational institutions
3. Private educational institutions
4. Maktab Rendah Sains MARA (MRSM)
5. Royal Military College (RMC)

=== Duties of Ministers and government bodies ===
Section 6 of the Act legally requires the Minister of Education to issue guidelines for the prevention of bullying and procedures for handling bullying cases in a school or educational institution. It also requires the minister to initiate research, prepare training materials, and establish monitoring system on the prevention and management of bullying cases. The minister is also required to make such other guidelines or directions as may be necessary for the better implementation of this Act.

Section 11, 16 and 22 mirrored the provisions of section 6, which placed the same aforementioned legal duties and responsibilities on the Majlis Amanah Rakyat (MARA), the Minister of Defence, and the Minister of Women, Family and Community Development who operates MRSM, Royal Military College, and institutions under the Child Act 2001, respectively.

=== Duties of educational institutions ===
Section 7(1) mandated that every schools or educational institutions governed by the Education Act 1996 shall establish a dedicated committee for the prevention and management of bullying cases, and implement any policies, guidelines or procedures for such cases. It also requires the school to establish an accessible child-sensitive channel for the reporting of bullying cases, in which confidentiality of the students shall be maintained. Counselling services and psychosocial support must also be provided by the school. The management of the school is also required to provide relevant trainings, and achieve certain standard of compliance on the prevention and management of bullying cases.

The schools or educational institutions may also be audited by the Education Ministry from time to time for the monitoring and evaluation of their compliance on anti-bullying guidelines or policies. Any findings from such audit will be submitted to the Human Rights Commission of Malaysia (SUHAKAM) for evaluation.

Per section 12, 17 and 23, these duties and requirements also apply the same to MRSM, the Royal Military College, and institutions under the Child Act 2001, which is controlled by MARA, the Ministry of Defence and the Ministry of Women, Family and Community Development, respectively.

=== Duties of anti-bully committees ===
According to section 8, 13, 18, and 24, the anti-bully committee in a school or educational institution shall be responsible in advising and assisting the management and prevention of bullying cases. The anti-bully committees were also tasked with the duties of receiving, handling and mediating any complaint of bullying. Additionally, the committee may also refer a bullying case to the Tribunal for Anti-Bully, after obtaining informed consent from the complainant.

=== Tribunal for Anti-Bully ===
Section 25 of the Act established the Tribunal for Anti-Bully, which consists of a president, a deputy president, and at least 10 other members. Among the minimum 10 members, at least five will came from public servants in the judicial and legal service, or from lawyers who have more than 7 years of legal experience and are experienced in child-related matters. The remaining five members of the tribunal will came from persons who have knowledge or practical experience in "matters relating to child, child psychology and development, or child restorative justice".

The tribunal has the jurisdiction to hear and determine a complaint of bullying, which may come from a complainant after the anti-bully committees failed to act on his case, or the complaint was referred by the committees to the tribunal after obtaining the informed consent of the complainant. The tribunal is also able to hear cases that happened outside an educational institution, if it involve a child student. A bullying case involving a child victim but not relating to any educational institution may also came under the jurisdiction of the tribunal. All hearings of the tribunal will be closed to the public.

The tribunal has the power to order a respondent to issue an apology, either in public or in private; to remove any online or electronic contents related to the bullying; to attend any rehabilitation programme; to join any counselling session; to join any parenting support session (for the parents or guardian); or to pay up to RM250,000 of compensation to the bully victim.

If the respondent failed to pay the compensation within 30 days, he may be punishable with a fine that is twice the amount of the original compensation, or with imprisonment of up to 2 years, or with both. If the case does not involve a compensation, then failure to comply with the tribunal's order may result in up to RM10,000 fine, or up to 2 years imprisonment, or to both. Reoffender will be subjected further RM1,000 fine per day.

=== Functions of Human Rights Commission ===
Under section 48, the Human Rights Commission of Malaysia (SUHAKAM) was given the duties of making recommendations to the government on legislative and administrative measures or policies to be taken to prevent bullying. SUHAKAM is also tasked to raise awareness on bullying, provide education on bullying prevention, and conduct any related workshop, programme, or saminar. It was also entrusted to disseminate and distribute the results of research done on bullying prevention.

On top of that, SUHAKAM was also required to provide an annual report to the Parliament on its activities on prevention and management of bullying cases in schools or educational institutions.

== Effects ==
As of 22 September 2026, there have been 55 bullying complaints referred to the Tribunal for Anti-Bully, of which 5 cases have concluded. Among the 5 cases, bullies have been ordered to apologise to their victims, to undergo counselling programme, and in one case, to pay RM2,000 in damage. When revealing these figures, law minister Azalina Othman stated that the tribunal's approach does not rest solely on punishment, but also put emphasis on rehabilitation.

== Reactions ==
=== Malaysian Bar ===
The passing of the Act was welcomed by the Malaysian Bar, calling it "a major step in protecting children and strengthening justice". It also welcomed the government's potential plan to expand the Act to cover individuals aged 18 or above. After the Act fully came into force on 16 June 2026, the Malaysian Bar's Child Rights Committee praised the new legislation as the "best mechanism" to address bullying cases, as it also binds the families of bullying perpetrators when an award is issued by the tribunal, thereby establishing joint accountability in bullying cases.

=== SUHAKAM ===
On 18 June 2026, the Children's Commissioners of SUHAKAM in a statement expressed their support on the newly established anti-bully tribunal, and welcomed the creation of an accessible and child-sensitive complaint mechanism under the tribunal, which they claimed reflects the government's commitment in combating bullying.

=== Civil groups and parents ===
Parent Action Group for Education Malaysia (PAGE) also welcomed the coming into force of the Act, stating that the Act "places children’s well-being at the centre and recognises that bullying has serious emotional, psychological and educational consequences".

Antibuli.my co-founder Shamir Rajadurai said that the tribunal should act swiftly and not making the bullying victims wait long for a judgement, and it should also be transparent and independent of outiside influence. Meanwhile, National Union of the Teaching Profession (NUTP) secretary-general Fouzi Singon hoped that the tribunal will served as a preventive factor, as he reasons that bullying perpetrators will now aware that their actions can result in more severe punishments.

Lau Sie Lok, president of Simpang Tiga Area Community Association and of Padawan Foochow Association from Kuching also praised the Act for its emphasis on preventive measures and collective parental accountability, calling it a progressive move that addresses the root causes of bullying rather relying solely on punishment. He also hoped that this new legislation will deter future bullying cases.

Several parents in Johor when interviewed by New Straits Times and Berita Harian back in January 2026 also expressed approval for the passing of the Act.

=== Politicians ===
Sarawak United People’s Party (SUPP) Kuching Youth chief Nicholas Wung Duk Ying hailed the Act and the mechanism established under it as the government's commitment in tackling the issue of bullying in the country, describing the tribunal as an additional avenue for victims to seek redress while preventing bullying incidents from being left unresolved. However Wung cautioned that the tribunal's adjudication process must be based on facts, evidence and due process. He also stressed that collective efforts from parents, educators, community leaders and government agencies are required in order to effectively implement the Act.

== See also ==
- Bullying
- School bullying
- Cyberbullying
- Anti-bullying legislation
