= Dewey Cornell =

American forensic and clinical psychologist

- Born: Dewey Gene Cornell
- Education: Transylvania University; University of Michigan
- Scientific career
- Fields: Forensic psychology
- Workplaces: University of Virginia
- Thesis: Families of Gifted Children (1981)

Dewey G. Cornell is an American forensic clinical psychologist known for his research on youth violence and school safety. He is Professor of Education in the School of Education and Human Development (formerly the Curry School of Education) at the University of Virginia, where he also holds the Virgil Ward Chair in Education. He is the director of the University of Virginia's Virginia Youth Violence Project, as well as a faculty associate at the university's Institute of Law, Psychiatry, and Public Policy. He is the principal author of the Virginia Student Threat Assessment Guidelines (now Comprehensive School Threat Assessment Guidelines), which is widely used for threat assessment in schools in the United States and Canada.

== Career ==
Cornell graduated summa cum laude from Transylvania University in Lexington, Kentucky with majors and departmental honors in both Psychology and Philosophy in 1977. He studied clinical psychology at the University of Michigan, earning his MA in 1979 and Ph.D. in 1981. He completed two years as a Postdoctoral Scholar in Psychology in the Department of Psychiatry at the University of Michigan.

From 1983 to 1986 he completed forensic examiner training and worked as a forensic clinical psychologist at the Center for Forensic Psychiatry, a maximum security state forensic institution. In 1986, he joined the faculty of the University of Virginia as an assistant professor of education for the Programs in Clinical and School Psychology in the Curry School of Education. He was promoted to Associate Professor with tenure in 1991 and Full Professor in 1999.

== Legislative testimony on violence prevention ==
Cornell testified on the prevention of youth violence at Congressional briefings or hearings in 1994, following the Columbine High School shooting in 1999 (three times), 2001, 2007 (three times), and 2013. Following the 2007 shooting at Virginia Tech, he testified at a Congressional hearing in which he recommended the use of behavioral threat assessment teams in higher education. In 2008, Virginia became the first state to require threat assessment teams in its public colleges and universities. He developed recommended practices for Virginia’s institutions of higher education and led the initial statewide training program. He served on the Virginia Governor’s Task Force on School and Campus Safety in 2013, which led to legislation making Virginia the first state to require K-12 schools to use threat assessment teams. He testified at separate congressional briefings on school violence on March 20 and March 23, 2018, following the high school shooting in Parkland, FL.

== Court testimony on violent crime ==
Cornell has testified as an expert witness for numerous court cases involving violent crimes in Florida, Kentucky, Maryland, Michigan, Virginia, West Virginia, and Wisconsin. Notably, he was the court-appointed capital mitigation expert for the DC sniper case, Virginia v. Lee Boyd Malvo, in 2003. Cornell testified that 17-year-old Lee should not be given the death penalty because of his immaturity and his attachment to his pseudo-father John Muhammad, who subjected him to military-style training to assist him in shootings as part of a radical religious mission. Cornell was also the court-appointed defense expert in school shooting cases in Kentucky (Kentucky v. Michael Carneal) and Wisconsin (Wisconsin v. Leonard McDowell). These cases informed Cornell’s development of the Comprehensive School Threat assessment Guidelines.”

== Consultation on violence prevention ==
Cornell served on the expert panel of the FBI National Center for the Analysis of Violent Crime (NCAVC) and contributed to their 2000 report recommending the use of behavioral threat assessment in K-12 schools. He served on various advisory boards and panels, including the NCAVC Research Advisory Board, the Alberti Center for Bullying Abuse Prevention, Lady Gaga’s Born This Way Foundation, the APA Panel on Gun Violence, the AERA Task Force on Bullying Prevention, the Sandy Hook Promise Foundation, and committees focused on school security, discipline reform, and mental health initiatives. Cornell contributed to an interdisciplinary statement on the prevention of gun violence with an 8-point plan.

== Research funding ==
Cornell’s research has been funded by three agencies of the U.S. Department of Justice: the National Institute of Justice, Office of Juvenile Justice and Delinquency Prevention, and Bureau of Justice Assistance. He has been funded by the U.S. Department of Education, the Open Society Foundations, the Jessie Ball duPont Fund, the Harry Frank Guggenheim Foundation, the Virginia Department of Criminal Justice Services, Department of Health, and others.

== Research ==
Cornell has authored more than 300 publications in psychology and education, including peer-reviewed articles in scientific journals, book chapters, and technical reports. His books include Juvenile Homicide (with Elissa Benedek), School Violence: Fears Versus Facts, and Comprehensive School Threat Assessment Guidelines, 2nd Edition.

=== School bullying ===
Since 1998, Cornell's research has shown that bullying increases dropout rates and lowers test scores. He critiques anonymous surveys for measuring bullying and advocates for peer nominations, developing a method to help counselors identify victims. His recent work also addresses the harmful impact of teacher bullying on students.

=== School threat assessment ===
Cornell's research highlights CSTAG's success in reducing suspensions, expulsions, and law enforcement actions without racial disparities. In 2024, Cornell co-authored the School Threat Assessment Toolkit to guide schools in implementing BTAM.

=== Authoritative school climate ===
Cornell advocates for authoritative school climate theory, where schools are both structured and supportive. Here, discipline is fair, expectations are high, and students feel respected and supported. Funded by the U.S. Department of Justice, Cornell’s team developed the Authoritative School Climate Survey, used statewide in Virginia and beyond. Research shows that schools with this climate are safer, have less bullying, and improve student engagement and retention.

=== Giftedness ===
Early in his career, Cornell studied family dynamics in gifted children, finding that labeling a child as gifted often led to adjustment problems. Supportive family relationships, rather than activities or values, were key to healthy self-esteem. His work showed that gifted students generally had few adjustment problems, though early college entrants faced higher depression rates. He also co-authored Recommended Practices in Gifted Education, the first evidence-based guide for gifted programs.

== Honors ==
Cornell held the Curry Memorial Chair in Education from 2002 to 2005, the Linda Bunker Chair in Education from 2005 to 2020, and the Virgil Ward Chair in Education since 2020.

Cornell (with co-authors) received the Distinguished Research Award from the Counseling and Development Division of the American Educational Research Association in 2011, 2013, 2016, and 2021.

Cornell received the Promise Champion award from the Sandy Hook Promise Foundation in 2015 for his development of the Comprehensive School Threat Assessment Guidelines as a school violence prevention program.
