= Xiula =

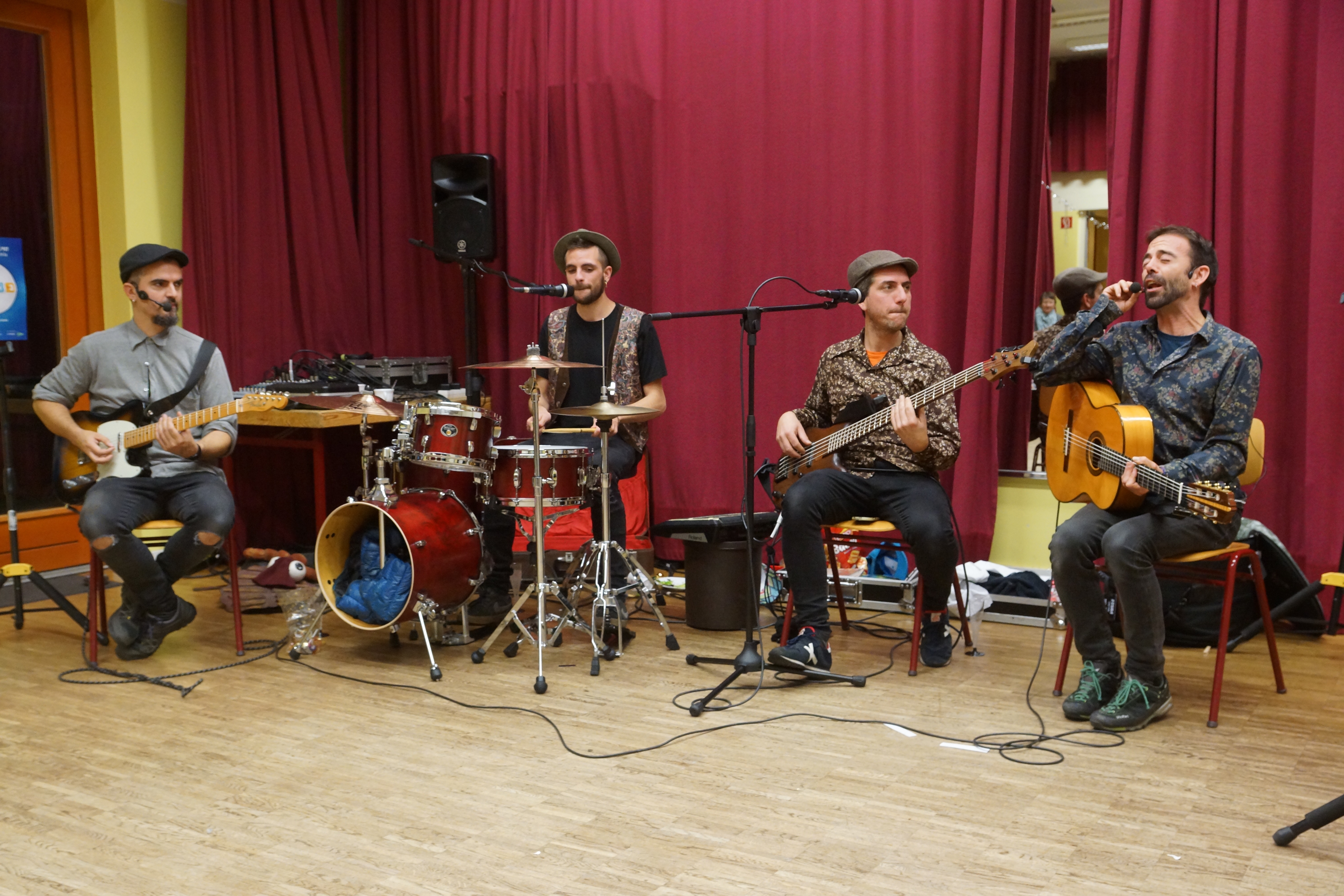
- Xiula in Hamburg (2017)

Background information
- Origin: Barcelona, Catalonia
- Genres: Children’s music • educational • hip-hop • reggae • rumba catalana • dubstep • pop-rock
- Years active: 2011–present
- Members: Jan Garrido (musician & social educator) • Rikki Arjuna (guitar & vocals) • Adrià Heredia (bass & vocals) • Marc Soto (guitar & vocals)
- Website: https://xiula.cat/

Xiula is a musical children's entertainment group from Barcelona composed of two musicians and two social educators, sing songs in Catalan drawing on current rhythms such as hip-hop, reggae, rumba catalana, dubstep or pop-rock. They are known for creating music for children and young audiences that combines adult-style sounds with socially-aware lyrics aimed at kids.

Their song "Verdura i peix" ("Vegetables and Fish") from their first album Donem-li una volta al món ("Let's Turn the World Around") became their best-known track. It is a rap track that by 2017 had over 150,000 views on YouTube. The same year they were one of the four nominees for the Premi ARC for “Best family-oriented artist or musical group tour”.

In 2018 they returned with their third album Dintríssim ("Dintríssim"), supported by the single of the same name, which undertook an expedition into the human body as its concept. Their album Descontrol mparental ("Parental Discontrol"), published November 2020, explores what happens to adults when children arrive.

In recent years they have created songs accompanied by video-clips tackling subjects such as school bullying, evictions, or child sexual abuse.

== Discography ==
- Donem-li una volta al món ("Let's Turn the World Around") (2014)
- 5.472 M (2016)
- Dintríssim ("Dintríssim") (2018)
- Cuarto lagarto ("Fourth Lizard") (2020)
- Descontrol mparental ("Parental Discontrol") (2020)
- Hits (2022)
- Babynova (2023)
- Xiulalaland (2025)

== Notable songs / Hits ==
- "Verdura i peix" ("Vegetables and Fish")
- "Sucre" ("Sugar")
- "Mirada estràbica" ("Cross-eyed Look")
- "T’estimo bastant" ("I Love You Quite a Bit")
- "xiula i els confinats – em quedo a casa" ("xiula and the confined – I Stay at Home") – dedicated to the COVID-19 lockdown
- "Himne dels perdedors" ("Losers’ Anthem")
- "L’escola que volem" ("The School We Want")
- "El meu cos és meu" ("My Body is Mine")
- "Polls" ("Lice")
- "Mocs" ("Boogers")
- "Pots pixar assegut" ("You Can Pee Sitting Down") – featuring Manu Guix
- "Dol i fa sol" ("Grief and Sun") – featuring Joan Garriga and Ju; created to accompany grief processes and captured in a documentary.
- "Roots"
- "Resta portant-ne" ("Carrying Remainders")
