= School violence in the Philippines =

School violence in the Philippines is addressed through national and local laws, department orders, and school policies. The Department of Education provides various policies implemented in schools offering Basic Education while the Commission on Higher Education regulates the Higher Education Institutions in the Philippines.

== Statistics ==
In 2018, a study conducted by the Programme for International Student Assessment (PISA) shows that 65% of students in the Philippines experienced bullying a few times a month and 20% responded of being bullied at least once a week..

In 2022, a PISA study revealed that 43% girls and 53% boys reported to have experienced bullying in various forms and one in three students experienced bullying once a week or more.

In a hearing conducted by the Senate of the Philippines in 2023, the data presented on school bullying does not disaggregate data for Learners with Disabilities (LWDs). The lack of data was commented by the Autism Society Philippines. There is a need to improve data collection in bullying incidents to respond to the needs of LWDs.

== Prevention ==
UNESCO declared the first Thursday of November as the International Day against Violence and Bullying at School, including Cyberbullying.

=== Mental Health ===
On March 2, 2004, Republic Act No. 9258 or the Guidance and Counseling Act of 2004 was approved.

On March 16, 2009, Republic Act No. 10029 or the Philippine Psychology Act of 2009 was approved.

On June 20, 2018, Republic Act No. 11036 or the Mental Health Act was approved.

On December 6, 2024, Republic Act No. 12080 or the Basic Education Mental Health and Well-Being Promotions Act was approved. In June 30, 2026, the Civil Service Commission (CSC) issued a qualification standard (QS) for Schools Division Counselor, School Counselor, and School Counselor Association.

In July 6, 2026, the Psychological Association of the Philippines recommended strengthening the comprehensive mental health systems in the country as a long-term approach to prevent school violence.

=== Police Visibility ===
==== Philippine National Police ====
For School Year 2025-2026, the Philippine National Police reported to have deployed over 37,000 police officers to monitor public and private schools and plans to put police assistance desks within the school vicinity.

==== Barangay Police ====
In 2026, the Department of the Interior and Local Government through Memorandum Circular No. 2026-037 directed all Local Government Units (LGUs) to establish Safer School Zones (SSZs) and deploy Barangay Police Officers or Barangay Tanod.

== Policies ==
=== Anti Bomb Joke Law ===
On October 8, 1980, Presidential Decree No. 1727, or the "Anti-Bomb Joke Law", was signed. According to the law, the penalty shall be imprisonment of not more than five (5) years or a fine of not more than forty thousand pesos, or both.

DepEd Order No. 006, s. 2026, or the Guidelines on Ensuring a Safe Motivating Learning Environment (ESMLE), provides penalties on bomb jokes. According to DepEd, bomb jokes are classified as a third level offence and students will not be allowed to enroll in the following school year.

=== Anti-Bullying ===
On September 12, 2013, Republic Act No. 10627 or the Anti-Bullying Act of 2013 was approved. The law classifies bullying into four types: Physical, Emotional, Verbal, and Cyber-bullying

In June 2026, a Revised Implementing Rules and Regulations of Republic Act No. 10627 was signed. The new IRR is aligned with Republic Act No. 12080 or the Basic Education Mental Health and Well-Being Promotion Act which was approved on December 6, 2024. According to the Revised IRR, every school is required to have an Anti-Bullying Policy.

=== Anti-Child Abuse Law ===
On June 17, 1992, Republic Act No. 7610 or the Special Protection of Child Against Abuse, Exploitation and Discrimination Act was approved.

=== Anti-Hazing Act ===
==== Anti Hazing Law ====
The Anti-Hazing Act of 1995, officially designated as Republic Act No. 8049, is a Philippine law that regulates the acts of hazing and other initiation rites in fraternities and sororities in the country. It prohibits and penalizes physical harm and violence in such practices.

==== Anti Hazing Act of 2018 ====
The Anti-Hazing Act of 2018, officially designated as Republic Act No. 11053, is a Philippine law that prohibits hazing and regulates other forms of initiation rites in fraternities, sororities, and other organizations. It amended Republic Act No. 8049, the country's earlier anti-hazing law, by expressly prohibiting all forms of hazing, expanding the persons and organizations covered, and increasing criminal and administrative penalties.

The law applies to school-based and community-based organizations, as well as the Armed Forces of the Philippines, the Philippine National Police, and similar uniformed-service learning institutions. Although hazing is prohibited, initiation rites that do not constitute hazing remain lawful when the notice, registration, monitoring, and other requirements of the Act are followed.

=== Safe Spaces Act ===
The Safe Spaces Act, colloquially known as the Bawal Bastos Law and officially designated as Republic Act No. 11313, is a Philippine law that penalize gender-based sexual harassment.

=== Zone of Peace ===
In 2017, during the Siege of Marawi, the Department of Education required all schools in Mindanao to put up “This school is a peace zone.”

On January 10, 2019, Republic Act No. 11188 or the Special Protection of Children in Situations of Armed Conflict Act was approved of which in Section 6 declares children as Zones of Peace.

== See also ==
- School violence in the United Kingdom
- School violence in the United States
