= Anti-bullying legislation =

Laws intended to combat bullying

Anti-bullying legislation is legislation enacted to help reduce and eliminate bullying. This legislation may be national or sub-national and is commonly aimed at ending bullying in schools or workplaces. According to one study, state-level anti-bullying legislation in the United States was associated with reductions in bullying, depression and suicidal ideation. The large impacts were observed for female teenagers and LGBT teenagers. For female teenagers, the suicide rate declined by 13-16%.

== Asia ==
=== Malaysia ===
In 2025, an amendment to the Penal Code of Malaysia, which was previously passed by the Malaysian Parliament back in December 2024, officially came into on 11 July 2025. The amendment criminalised the acts of causing harassment, distress, fear or alarm towards a person through the use of any threatening, abusive or insulting words or physical acts, which carries up to 1 year of imprisonment or fine. The act of doxxing is also criminalised under the amendment, which is punishable with up to 3 years imprisonment or fine. If a victim so provoked by such abusive language or threats committed suicide or attempted to commit suicide, the offender can be punished with up to 10 years imprisonment.

In 2026, the Anti-bully Act 2026, which was passed by the Malaysian Parliament back in December 2025, fully came into force on 16 June 2026. The Act, which among others, introduced a Tribunal for Anti-bully, which can conduct hearings on complaints of bullying in schools or educational institution. The tribunal can award compensation of up to RM250,000 to the bullying victim, order the bullying perpetrator to apologize, to attend counselling session, or instruct the perpetrator's parents to attend parenting classes.

=== Philippines ===
The Republic Act 10627, also known as Anti-Bullying Act of 2013, was signed into law by former President Benigno Aquino III on September 6, 2013. The law requires all elementary and secondary schools in the country to adopt an anti-bullying policy. According to a study conducted in 2008 by the Britain-based Plan International, 50 percent of school children in the Philippines experienced bullying either by their teachers or their peers.

=== South Korea ===
In 2004, the Act on the Prevention of and Countermeasures Against Violence in Schools was enacted in South Korea. In the lead up to its legislation, The Blue Tree Foundation (BTF; Formerly Foundation for Preventing Youth Violence; FPYV), Korea's NGO specializing in school violence prevention, spearheaded a civic movement involving 470,000 citizens.

== North America ==
=== Canada ===
This law was enacted in 2012. The provincial government of Quebec initiated legislation to help support the anti-bullying laws with Quebec law having come into effect in 2012. Federal politicians and decision makers also debated the groundwork for a national anti-bullying strategy that the same year.

=== United States ===
==== History ====
All fifty states in the United States have passed school anti-bullying legislation, the first being Georgia in 1999. Montana became the most recent and last state to adopt anti-bullying legislation in April 2015. A watchdog organization called Bully Police USA advocates for and reports on anti-bullying legislation.

North Dakota's legislature passed the bill and Governor Jack Dalrymple signed a bill into law April 22, 2011, which defines bullying encoded in the state law and outlines prevention policies for North Dakota public schools. North Dakota has been praised for their new law and other states have followed suit. Prior to its passage, North Dakota has passed anti-bullying legislation.

Georgia's anti-bullying legislation was strengthened in 2010 with the passage of Senate Bill 250, which included a provision to allow for those accused of bullying another student to be reassigned to another school in order to separate the offender from the victim of bullying.

The Safe and Drug Free Schools and Communities Act is part of the No Child Left Behind Act of 2001. It provides federal support to promote school safety but does not specifically address bullying and harassment in schools. There are no federal laws dealing directly with school bullying; however, bullying may trigger responsibilities under one or more of the federal anti-discrimination laws enforced by the United States Department of Education’s Office for Civil Rights.

In September 2011, the State of New Jersey started enforcing the toughest bullying law in the country. Each school has to report every case of bullying to the state and the state will grade each school based on bullying standards, policies, and incidents. Each school must have an effective plan to deal with bullying. All school administrators and teachers are required to deal with any incidents of bullying reported to them or witnessed by them. Teachers must report any bullying incidents they witness to the administrators. Bullies risk suspensions to expulsions if convicted of any type of bullying; from minor teasing to severe cases.

Nobel Peace Prize nominee and world-renowned anti-bullying expert Christina Catalano has stated that "[bullied individuals] can suffer from various issues such as the lack of confidence, problems in academics, social anxiety and the fear of public speaking." In addition, prominent legal scholar Jonathan Burley has stated "bullying is an extremely serious injustice towards our children" and has been a consistent advocate of anti-bullying legislation.

Others have been more critical of this legislation for being punitive and criminalizing the issue.

Although no federal assistance currently exists for anti-bullying efforts, Thursday's Child offers a 24-hour helpline for children, teens, and young adults in the U.S., who are bullying victims at 1 (800) USA KIDS or (818) 831-1234 from a mobile device. Currently, it is the only such helpline in North America.

==== Controversy ====
The National School Safety and Security Services questions the motive behind some anti-bullying legislation. According to the National School Safety and Security Services, the line between "feel-good legislation" and "meaningful legislation" is not clear at the moment and The National School Safety and Security Services suggests "unfunded state mandates, and an overemphasis on any one component of school safety will likely have minimal impact on school safety and could potentially interfere the comprehensive approach to school safety recommended by most school safety professionals."

According to National Safety and Securities Services, "Anti-bullying legislation, typically an unfunded mandate requiring schools to have anti-bullying policies, but providing no financial resources to improve school climate and security offer more political hype than substance for helping school administrators address the problem."

Gail Garinger, Child Advocate for the Commonwealth of Massachusetts, advises legislators not to push new legislation each time the media highlights a new bullying incident, saying, "Maybe a new law is needed in your state to deal with a situation, but don’t rush to do it. Sit down. Really talk about what happened." She adds, "I think school officials have gotten really frightened because of what’s been occurring, and it’s much easier to take a zero-tolerance approach and just label everything quickly as bullying and pass it on to someone else to deal with rather than try to work out a creative solution within the school that’s best for everyone involved."

==== LGBTQ bullying ====
Some states of the United States have implemented laws to address school bullying. Law that prohibits discrimination against students based on sexual orientation and gender identity School regulation or ethical code for teachers that address discrimination and/or bullying of students based on sexual orientation and gender identity Law that prohibits discrimination against students based on sexual orientation only School regulation or ethical code for teachers that address discrimination and/or bullying of students based on sexual orientation only Law that prohibits bullying of students based on sexual orientation and gender identity Law that forbids local school districts from having anti-bullying policies that enumerate protected classes of students Law that prohibits bullying in school but lists no categories of protection No statewide law that specifically prohibits bullying in schools

Anti-bullying legislation received national attention after the suicide of Rutgers University student Tyler Clementi. In the wake of the incident, New Jersey strengthened its anti-bullying legislation by passing a bill called "The Anti-Bullying Bill of Rights". Garden State Equality Chairman Steve Goldstein called New Jersey's bill the "toughest" anti-bullying law in the country. The bill states administrators who do not investigate reports of bullying can be disciplined.

Various organizations provide resources and support to gay, lesbian, bisexual, transgender, and questioning youth. These organizations include The Trevor Project, The Tyler Clementi Foundation, It Gets Better Project, and The Matthew Shepard Foundation.

==== Cyberbullying ====
According to the Cyberbullying Research Center, approximately 20 percent of children in the ages of 11-18 have been victims of cyberbullying. Cyberbullying is defined by Sameer Hinduja and Justin Patchin as "willful and repeated harm inflicted through the use of computers, cell phones, and other electronic devices." Cyberbullying can occur 24 hours a day, seven days a week.

In August 2008, the California State Legislature passed a law directly related with cyber-bullying. The legislation gives school administrators the authority to discipline students for bullying others offline or online.

Many states already have existing criminal and civil remedies to deal with cyberbullying, and extreme cases would fall under criminal harassment or stalking laws or targets of such extreme bullying could pursue civil action for intentional infliction of emotional distress or defamation. In the summer of 2011, Public Act 11-232 made significant changes to the state of Connecticut statute which defines bullying as the following: (A) The repeated use by one or more students of written, oral or electronic communication, such as cyberbullying, directed at or referring to another student attending school in the same school district, or (B) a physical act or gesture by one or more students repeatedly directed at another student attending school in the same school district, that (i) causes physical or emotional harm to himself or herself, or of damage to his or her property, (ii) places such student in reasonable fear of harm to himself or herself, or of damage to his or her property, (iii) creates a hostile environment at school for such student, (iv) infringes on the rights of such student at school, or (v) substantially disrupts the education process or the orderly operation of a school

Beyond this, bullying includes but is not limited to "a written, oral or electronic communication or physical act or gesture-based on any actual or perceived differentiating characteristic, such as race, color, religion ancestry, national origin, gender, sexual orientation, gender identity or expression, socioeconomic status, academic status, physical appearance, or mental, physical, developmental or sensory disability, or by association with an individual or group who has or is perceived to have one or more of such characteristics." (Connecticut Department of Education)

Effective December 1, 2012, North Carolina has made it a crime for students to bully teachers. Students can face jail time and/or a $1,000 fine for cyberbullying any school employees. Prohibited conduct includes posting a photo of a teacher on the internet, making a fake website, and signing a teacher up for junk mail.

== South America ==
=== Chile ===
On September 7, 2011, Chile's Congress approved "The Law about School Violence," which amended the General Law on Education to establish clear definitions, procedures, and penalties for school violence and bullying.

The Law defines bullying as any repeated aggression or harassment that occurs inside or outside the educational institution, by one student or a group towards another, causing mistreatment, humiliation, or fear. Bullying may be perpetrated in person or through any means, including cyber-bullying. Educational institutions are required to create a Committee of Good School Coexistence (Comité de Buena Convivencia Escolar) that will be in charge of managing and taking measures needed to secure a non-violent school life.

== Europe ==
=== United Kingdom ===
Section 89 of the Education and Inspections Act 2006 includes a requirement for headteachers at state schools to determine behavior policy with the goal of preventing all forms of bullying among pupils".

== Oceania ==
=== Australia ===
In 2011, Victoria passed a law called Brodie's Law that makes serious bullying an offense.

== See also ==
- School bullying
- International day against violence and bullying at school including cyberbullying
