= New Jersey Anti-Bullying Bill of Rights Act =

Legislation in New Jersey, United States

The New Jersey Anti-Bullying Bill of Rights Act, also known as P.L. 2010, Chapter 122, is a policy created in 2011 by New Jersey legislature to combat bullying in public schools throughout the state. This act is an extension of the state's original anti-bullying law, N.J.S.A 18A:37-13, which was first enacted in 2002.

Both the New Jersey state Assembly and the state Senate passed the law unanimously in November 2010 and Governor Christie signed the bill on January 5, 2011. The law began to take effect at the beginning of the 2011 school year. Along with both Democratic and Republican legislators, organizations such as Garden State Equality, the Anti-Defamation League of New Jersey, and the New Jersey Coalition for Bullying Awareness and Prevention worked on creating this policy. The Anti-Bullying Bill of Rights provides a strong and thorough definition of bullying. The new bill's definition not only describes bullying as a harmful action towards another student, but as any act that infringes on a student's rights at school. In addition to defining bullying more clearly, the new bill will require that every public school, including higher education institutions, report all cases of bullying or teasing to the state. Verbal reports must be given to principals on the day of an observed incident and a written report must be provided within two days. Families must be notified, as well as the superintendent of schools, and an investigation must take place within ten days of the incident. Schools must also have a plan that outlines how they will address bullying and all teachers and administrators must be trained to identify and respond to bullying.

In addition to ensuring that schools are prepared to recognize and report bullying, the Anti-Bullying Bill of Rights also takes steps to ensure that schools are creating a positive environment for students. The law requires that every school have an anti-bullying specialist and a school safety team. These individuals must work to provide a safe and welcoming environment for all students. In addition, the first week in October has been designated as the "Week of Respect". During this week, schools are asked to teach about intimidation and harassment in order to make students more aware of the causes and effects of bullying.

== Historical Context ==
In 2002, New Jersey created an anti-bullying law that was one of the first of its kind. By the year 2003, New Jersey, along with 14 other states, had passed anti-bullying laws. A majority of states created these laws in response to a number of high school shootings that occurred throughout the 1990s, the most widely known being the Columbine High School massacre. There was much speculation and research after these shootings as to what caused them to occur. Research has found bullying to be one cause of such tragedies and schools saw the need to enact anti-bullying policies. Research has found that when students attack their classmates, it is most often closely tied to the fact that they were mistreated and bullied by their peers. The New Jersey anti-bullying law of 2002 was one of the most comprehensive policies that not only defined bullying but also guided educators in handling incidents in their classrooms. In addition to New Jersey, Connecticut and Georgia also enacted stringent anti-bullying laws in the early 2000s. While most of these laws enacted in the beginning of the 21st century provided little direction for schools to deal with bullying, the New Jersey law mandated the reporting of incidents of harassment or bullying.

Although New Jersey's anti-bullying law was extremely comprehensive in the year 2002, a number of events proved that it was not as strong as it needed to be to protect students. The first event that began to expose the law's weaknesses was a court case in the year 2007 against the Toms River Regional Schools Board of Education. A student in a Toms River school was being bullied because of his "perceived sexual orientation" and the harassment became so severe that he was forced to transfer to a different school. The case was brought to the New Jersey Supreme Court who ruled, "that a school district can be sued for damages, under the Law Against Discrimination (LAD), for not responding reasonably to bias-based student-on-student bullying and harassment that creates a hostile educational environment." This ruling brought the issue of bullying to the State's attention and lead to the creation of the New Jersey Commission on Bullying in Schools. In 2009, the Commission issued a report, "There Isn't a Moment to Lose", which outlined necessary legal and policy reforms to improve New Jersey's response to bullying. According to the Education Law Center, this report "heavily influenced" the creation of the Anti-Bullying Bill of Rights. In addition to the legal and political findings between 2007 and 2009, which exposed the need for a change in policy, there was also a new wave of bullying occurring on the Internet that was not being addressed in the 2002 law. Cyber-bullying, which is defined as the use of the Internet and technology to deliberately harm others, has become an issue in the 21st century. A majority of teens use the Internet on a regular basis, in chat rooms, on websites, or instant messaging. The Internet provides both an anonymous and infinite audience for cyber bullies to access, which changes the nature of bullying and schools' necessary responses to such incidents. Cyber bullying has led to a number of incidents of teenage suicide, the most publicly known being the suicide of a Rutgers University student, Tyler Clementi. This event reignited the public's attention towards bullying and the policies that need to be implemented to protect students. New Jersey legislators reacted by unanimously supporting the New Jersey Anti-Bullying Bill of Rights Act.

== Changes in Policy ==
The updated New Jersey anti-bullying policy was given an A++ by the Bully Police, a watchdog organization that reports on and grades states' anti-bullying legislation. While the 2002 bill only protected specific groups of students against bullying for specific reasons, such as discrimination, the 2010 bill protects all students, regardless of the purpose for bullying. In addition, the Anti-Bullying Bill of Rights includes cyber bullying and bullying that takes place both on and off school grounds. Although the original bill required that harassment incidents be reported, the current bill improves on this idea by including specific deadlines for bullying reports. The 2010 law also changes the way the public can access information about bullying at schools. All schools are graded on their safety and this grade must be posted on the school website. Schools are also taking more preemptive actions to prevent bullying through increased teacher training on suicide prevention and in-school safety teams. The 2010 Anti-Bullying Bill of Rights has fundamentally changed the landscape for anti-bullying policy by strengthening its definition of bullying since 2002. In 2002, bullying was anything that caused harm to a student. The law now defines bullying as any action that creates a hostile school environment or infringes on a student's rights at school. The new bill is now seen as one of the toughest anti-bullying laws in the United States.
