= Elissa P. Benedek =

American psychiatrist

- Born: Elissa Panush; September 28, 1936 (age 89); Detroit, Michigan
- Education: M.D., University of Michigan, 1960
- Occupation: Adjunct clinical professor of psychiatry
- Medical career
- Institutions: University of Michigan
- Sub-specialties: Child and adolescent psychiatry, forensic psychiatry

Elissa Panush Benedek (born September 28, 1936) is an American psychiatrist specializing in child and adolescent psychiatry and forensic psychiatry. She is an adjunct clinical professor of psychiatry at the University of Michigan Medical Center. She served as director of research and training at the Center for Forensic Psychiatry in Ann Arbor for 25 years and was president of the American Psychiatric Association from 1990 to 1991. She is regarded as an expert on child abuse and trauma, and has testified in high-profile court cases. She also focuses on ethics, psychiatric aspects of disasters and terrorism, and domestic violence. In addition to her own books, book chapters, and articles, she has collaborated with her husband, attorney Richard S. Benedek, on studies of divorce, child custody, and child abuse.

== Early life and education ==
Elissa Panush was born in Detroit, Michigan on September 28, 1936 to Louis and Tillie Panush. Her father was a school principal and science teacher, and her mother taught in elementary school. She had three sisters. She graduated from Central High School in Detroit in 1954 and won a scholarship to the University of Michigan.

She earned her undergraduate degree at the University of Michigan and went on to attend the medical school on the same campus. She chose to specialize in psychiatry since it was one of the few specialties open to women physicians in that era, and would also allow the flexibility of maintaining a medical practice while raising a family. She trained in general psychiatry at the medical school's neuropsychiatric institute and in child psychiatry at the Children's Psychiatric Hospital on campus. She earned her M.D. in 1960, and completed her residency in 1962 and a fellowship in child and adolescent psychiatry in 1964.

== Career ==
After finishing her residency, she began working as a psychiatrist at the York Wood Center, a residential treatment facility for youth in Ypsilanti. She next moved to the Center for Forensic Psychiatry to become associate director of child psychiatry and the center's first director of training and research. During her tenure, she helped formulate a forensic fellowship program which later became a joint venture with the University of Michigan. In 1975 she performed a preliminary evaluation of as-yet uncharged serial killer Coral Watts at the center.

By 1991 she was a full professor in clinical psychiatry at the University of Michigan and Wayne State University School of Medicine. She is also a faculty member of the University of Michigan Comprehensive Depression Center. She maintains a private practice in Ann Arbor for child, adolescent, adult, and forensic psychiatry.

She is regarded as an expert on child abuse and trauma, and also focuses on ethics, the psychiatric aspects of disasters and terrorism, and domestic violence. She has testified in numerous high-profile court cases. In 1975 she testified for the defense in the murder trial of Ruth Childers, advancing the psychological theory of battered woman syndrome, first developed by Lenore E. Walker. In the 1980s she testified in the Wee Care Nursery School abuse trial, and was the primary psychiatric witness for Dr. Eric Foretich in his February 1987 civil court proceeding related to the Morgan v. Foretich child custody case. She was accused of child abuse by Foretich's ex-wife Elizabeth Morgan, who surreptitiously filmed Benedek during her examination of her daughter, and was accused of perjury by Morgan's mother, who filed a complaint with the APA over Benedek's testimony that Morgan had probably been abused by her own father. She testified for the U.S. government in a 1998 lawsuit against Playboy Television about signal bleed of adult material on cable television.

Benedek mentors medical students, psychiatry residents, and forensic psychiatry fellows at the University of Michigan, allowing the latter to "shadow" her during her courtroom appearances.

== Affiliations and memberships ==
Benedek was president of the American Psychiatric Association (APA) from 1990 to 1991. She was only the second woman to be named to this post since the association was founded in 1844. Previously, she served as vice president (1983–1985), secretary (1985– ), and trustee of the APA.

In 2001 she was appointed as a director of the American Council on Science and Health.

== Awards and honors ==
In 2016 Benedek received the Alexandra Symonds Award from the APA and the Association of Women Psychiatrists in recognition of her "significant contributions to promoting women's health and the advancement of women".

== Personal life ==
She met her husband, Richard Sandor Benedek, at the University of Michigan, where he was studying law. He received his J.D. in 1958 and they married between Elissa's sophomore and junior years. They have four children. Richard maintains a law practice in Ann Arbor. The couple has collaborated on studies of divorce, child custody, and child abuse.

== Selected bibliography ==
=== Books ===
- Principles and Practice of Child and Adolescent Forensic Mental Health. American Psychiatric Pub. 2009. ISBN 978-1-58562-901-5. (with Peter Ash and Charles L. Scott)
- Principles and Practice of Child and Adolescent Forensic Psychiatry. American Psychiatric Pub. 2002. ISBN 978-0-88048-956-0. (with Diane H. Schetky)
- Benedek, Elissa P. (1999). New Directions for Mental Health Services, Emerging Issues in Forensic Psychiatry. ISBN 978-0-7879-9901-8.
- How to Help Your Child Overcome Your Divorce. American Psychiatric Pub. 1995. ISBN 978-0-88048-565-4. (with Catherine F. Brown) Revised ed. 2001
- Clinical Handbook of Child Psychiatry and the Law. Williams & Wilkins. 1992. ISBN 978-0-683-07589-2. (with Diane H. Schetky)
- Juvenile Homicide. American Psychiatric Press. 1989. ISBN 978-0-88048-145-8. (with Dewey G. Cornell)
- The Secret Worry. Human Sciences Press. 1984. ISBN 978-0-89885-133-5.
- Emerging Issues in Child Psychiatry and the Law. Brunner/Mazel. 1985. ISBN 978-0-87630-393-1. (with Diane H. Schetky)
- What Would You Do? A child's book about divorce. Saturday Evening Post Co. 1976. ISBN 978-0-88048-300-1. (with Barbara S. Cain)

=== Book chapters ===
- Benedek, Elissa P. (2013), "Female Offenders", in Spurlock, Jeanne; Robinowitz, Carolyn B. (eds.), Women's Progress: Promises and Problems, Springer Science+Business Media, p. 159, ISBN 978-1-4899-0855-1
- Benedek, Elissa; Vaughn, Richard (2012), "Voluntary Childlessness", in Kirkpatrick, Martha (ed.), Women's Sexual Experience: Explorations of the Dark Continent, Springer Science+Business Media, p. 205, ISBN 978-1-4684-4025-6
- Benedek, Elissa P.; Kambam, Praveen (2008), "The Psychiatrist's Role After a School Shooting: The Emergency Room and Beyond", in Miller, Thomas W. (ed.), School Violence and Primary Prevention, Springer Science+Business Media, p. 323, ISBN 978-0-387-77119-9
- Benedek, Elissa P. (1985), "Children and Psychic Trauma: A brief review of contemporary thinking", in Eth, S.; Pynoos, R. S. (eds.), Post-traumatic Stress Disorder in Children, American Psychiatric Press

=== Articles ===
- Benedek, Elissa P. (1988). "Premenstrual Syndrome: A view from the bench". The Journal of Clinical Psychiatry. 49 (12): 498–502. PMID 3058681.
- Benedek, Elissa P. (September 1982). "The Role of the Child Psychiatrist in Court Cases Involving Child Victims of Sexual Assault". Journal of the American Academy of Child Psychiatry. 21 (5): 519–520. doi:10.1016/S0002-7138(09)60805-0. PMID 7130565.
- Benedek, Richard S.; Benedek, Elissa P. (October 1979). "Children of Divorce: Can we meet their needs?". Journal of Social Issues. 35 (4): 155–169. doi:10.1111/j.1540-4560.1979.tb00819.x.
- Benedek, Richard S.; Benedek, Elissa P. (1979). "The Child's Preference in Michigan Custody Disputes". American Journal of Family Therapy. 7 (4): 37–43. doi:10.1080/01926187908250335.
- Benedek, Elissa P.; Benedek, Richard S. (1979). "Joint Custody: Solution or illusion?". The American Journal of Psychiatry. 136 (12): 1540–4. doi:10.1176/ajp.136.12.1540. PMID 507203.
- Benedek, Richard S.; Benedek, Elissa P. (Spring 1977). "Postdivorce Visitation: A child's right". Journal of the American Academy of Child Psychiatry. 16 (2): 256–271. doi:10.1016/S0002-7138(09)60041-8. PMID 874219.
- Benedek, Richard S.; Del Campo, Robert L.; Benedek, Elissa P. (October 1977). "Michigan's Friends of the Court: Creative programs for children of divorce". The Family Coordinator. 26 (4): 447–450. doi:10.2307/581769. JSTOR 581769.
- Benedek, Elissa P.; Benedek, Richard S. (October 1972). "New Child Custody Laws: Making them do what they say". American Journal of Orthopsychiatry. 42 (5): 825–834. doi:10.1111/j.1939-0025.1972.tb00769.x. PMID 4653319.

== Sources ==
- International Who's who in Community Service. Vol. 1. Edison Press. 1973.
- Barton, Walter E. (1987). The History and Influence of the American Psychiatric Association. American Psychiatric Pub. ISBN 978-0-88048-231-8.
- Crowley, Patricia (1991). Not My Child. Avon Books London. ISBN 978-0-380-71276-2.
- Heins, Marjorie (2007). Not in Front of the Children: 'Indecency,' censorship, and the innocence of youth (2nd ed.). Rutgers University Press. ISBN 978-0-8135-4388-8.
- Mitchell, Corey (2006). Evil Eyes. Pinnacle Books. ISBN 978-0-7860-3780-3.
- Springer, David W.; Roberts, Albert R., eds. (2007). Handbook of Forensic Mental Health with Victims and Offenders: Assessment, Treatment, and Research. Springer Publishing Company. ISBN 978-0-8261-0113-6.
