= School violence in the United States =

According to the U.S. National Center for Education Statistics, school violence is a serious problem. In 2007, the latest year for which comprehensive data were available, a nationwide survey, conducted biennially by the Centers for Disease Control and Prevention (CDC) and involving representative samples of U.S. high school students, found that 5.9% of students carried a weapon (e.g. gun, knife, etc.) on school property during the 30 days antedating the survey. The rate was three times higher among men than among women. In the twelve months preceding the survey, 7.8% of high school students reported having been threatened or injured with a weapon on school property at least once, with the prevalence rate among male students twice that as among female students. In the twelve months preceding the survey, 12.4% of students had been in a physical fight on school property at least once. The rate among males was twice the rate found among females. In the thirty days preceding the survey, 5.5% of students reported that because they did not feel safe, they did not go to school on at least one day. The rates for males and females were approximately equal.

U.S. data on violent crime indicated that in the 2003–2004 school year, 7% (10% in urban schools) of teachers were subject to threats of injury by students, with 2–3% of teachers in non-urban and 5% of teachers in urban schools being physically attacked. Other members of school staffs are also at risk for violent attacks, with school bus drivers being particularly vulnerable.

During 2007–2008, teachers’ reports of being threatened or physically attacked by students varied according to the instructional level of their school. Secondary school teachers reported being threatened with injury by a student at slightly greater percentage, at 8%, than elementary school teachers, at 7%, and this pattern held for teachers in suburban schools as well as for teachers in rural schools.

== Controversies ==
=== Lax school authorities ===
In 2005, on a school bus in Montgomery County, Maryland, an 11-year-old girl was attacked by a group of several older boys, who the girl said grabbed her breasts and feigned sex acts. Also in 2005, on a school bus in Colonial Heights, Virginia, south of Richmond, three boys and two girls aged 8 to 13 held an 11-year-old girl down in the back of the bus and sexually assaulted her. In the Maryland case, the child's mother called the police, not the school, although a school administrator did notify the girl's mother (the students were not charged with sexual assault because the police mishandled the paperwork). In the Virginia case, the girl told her mother and was taken to a police station, prompting coordinated investigations by the police and the school. The bus driver testified that she saw the incident happening, but never stopped the bus. The girl was dropped off at her normal bus stop.

In 2008, the Baltimore School District failed to intervene in an act of violence committed against a teacher. A student had taken a video of a peer beating her art teacher. School officials ignored the problem until the video was posted on MySpace. Some cases of school violence have not been brought to the attention of the authorities because school administrators did not want their schools labeled unsafe under the No Child Left Behind (NCLB) Act. With or without NCLB, in the US, there has been a history of underreporting violent incidents occurring in schools.

=== The media ===
School shootings are unusual forms of school violence, and account for less than 1% of violent crimes in public schools, with an average of 16.5 deaths per year from 2001–2008. There exists an uneven number of male versus female perpetrators of school shootings, where males outnumber females. Some commentators claim that media coverage encourages school violence. On the other hand, the press would likely have been faulted if it did not cover serious threats to public safety such as the Virginia Tech massacre, Columbine massacre, Sandy Hook Elementary School shooting, Uvalde school shooting and Parkland high school shooting.

According to a CNN analysis of data from the Gun Violence Archive, Education Week, and Everytown for Gun Safety, at least 52 shootings had occurred on school and college grounds in the United States by October 15, 2026.

== Policies ==
There are many policies that surround school violence. A variety of these policies focus on student behavior and mitigating risks by addressing social aspects to help further the student’s social and emotional learning. Policies have also been floated around that address gun safety to lessen the risk associated with guns and schools. The outcomes of these different policies have had a variety of success. Each policy has lessened school violence in certain ways.

=== What Can Policies Address? ===
Policies can address certain behaviors that students may show that lead to traits commonly found in school shooters. Common traits could be a sign that something violent could occur, but these commonalities should not be used to determine punishment or profiling of students. A specific feature of perpetrators of school shootings is feeling rejected and insignificant compared to others. Addressing these feelings can be helpful to curb school violence, in particular shootings. Addressing school violence through the lens of student experiences has the potential to curb acts of violence that may occur. Society can give attention to mental health and bullying through intervention and prevention programs. These programs emphasize building communities around students and creating support systems that reduce bullying too. Another aspect the programs can address is the prevention of youth’s access to firearms. Handguns are the main weapon being used in kindergarten through 12th grade shootings, preventing access to firearms would allow for incidents to happen less.

Imminent threats to schools predominantly have signs that can be seen and addressed with policies before an incident. School and community members paying attention to threats on social media, threats towards the school, or threats certain students can be vital information that may disclose intentions of violence. Educating students on speaking out on information that may be helpful to staff and the community is also something that can be addressed in policies regarding school violence. Creating a safe and community-based environment in schools can be addressed while outweighing some of the other options taken to mitigate school violence, like lockdown drills, metal detectors, and school resource officers. The other options described may cause undue anxiety among students and complacency in the event of a real lockdown or violent school event. Being mindful of reward compared to cost of safety measure is something to be aware about for school educators and administrators.

Violence is also affected by a life environment that is turbulent, and this violence can seep into schooling. Addressing turbulent conditions, described as homelessness, frequent school changes, frequent address changes, and family structure changes, is something that could be done to prevent school violence. When exposed to turbulence, there is a higher chance for violence and exposure to violence, which may affect mental health and healthy behaviors. Students may be isolated when in turbulent transition periods. This may be a sign of poor mental health and association with violence.

=== Specific Policies Addressing School Violence ===
There are a variety of policies that can address school violence, such as Social Emotional Learning, Positive Behavior Intervention and Supports, Positive Action Programs, and Gun Safety Laws.

A common theme throughout these programs is addressing social and emotional needs. This is done through reciting clear expectations of the student’s behavioral and self-regulatory skills. Through the implementation of social and emotional learning in the programs, there has been reduction in negative behaviors shown by those in the program. Adding social emotional learning in the programs to address school violence also has been shown to increase positive behaviors, positive emotions, and personal responsibility. Because of these increases, students can become positive influences on their peers. School wide positive behavior interventions and supports create environments that reduce behavioral discipline. The reduction also occurs most effectively when the program is instituted for a long period of time. Suspensions were reduced when positive behavior supports in schools were used to address violences in schools. The people implementing the programs are teachers and staff members. Shared time with the students inside of the school environment allows for positive trends in classroom behavior and instruction for the fellow students. The clear behavior expectations implemented in the programs allowed for a consensus on behavioral expectations on the school campus. This successfully reduced school violence.

Shootings make up a relatively small amount of school violence in the United States, but its visibility makes it a large talking point for policy. Implementing a restrictive gun control policy results in fewer shootings in the following years. However, inversely, a larger access to guns, meaning a less restrictive gun control policy for the general population or educators, does not visibly increase school safety. A more restrictive gun control policy may be more successful at reducing gun violence during times of higher potential harm, like school days where class is in session. It is harder to interpret data that stricter gun control laws lower school violence in states that already have lower frequency of gun violence. Gun control policies are not all as effective as others stricter policies like criminal liability for negligent storage or bans on guns in certain areas. Implementing state policies that impact gun control may be a way of lowering the frequency of school violence.

=== Public reactions to School Violence and Policies ===
Parental concern over children’s safety in schools is on an increasing trend. Concern for student safety generally peaks after a casualty event, however, there has been an increase in safety concerns as violent offenses occur more frequently. It is not just one subgroup of parents being concerned for children’s safety, it is a variety and mix of all the subgroups. This means that parents, both male and female, across all grade levels, in all regions, across all incomes, and across all political parties have an increased sense of danger toward their children when they are at school. Children are also becoming more aware and concerned for their own safety at schools. An average of 12% of parents indicated that their children were feeling concerned over their safety at school, however the last poll indicated that 15% were feeling concerned, a noticeable raise in the 12% average. The Gallup Poll concluding these facts was conducted from the first through twentieth of August 2025, before a violent event in Minnesota, which could voice lesser concerns than the population is currently feeling.

School personnel are also concerned over their safety, with 21% of teachers stating that they were worried about being harmed during the 2024/25 school year. This concern extends from the teachers themselves with around 50% of educators being concerned that students may be attacked at school. This amount is an increase from previous polling. The largest concern for violence and worry stems from bullying and cyberbullying. Mental health is also a large concern for educators worry about their students, with 28% of principals reporting a staff or student suicide in previous years. Principals stated that security being present has created a positive impact on the school environment, while teachers are more skeptical of the effect of the physical security measures on school climate. Student trends also show that they may be inclined to feeling safer and more comfortable at schools where school resource officers are present.

== See also ==
- School violence in the Philippines
- School violence in the United Kingdom
- School corporal punishment in the United States
- Educational inequality in the United States
