= School violence =

Circumstance of violence

School violence includes violence between school students as well as attacks by students on school staff and attacks by school staff on students. It encompasses physical violence, including student-on-student fighting, corporal punishment; psychological violence such as verbal abuse, and sexual violence, including rape and sexual harassment. It includes many forms of bullying (including cyberbullying) and carrying weapons to school. The one or more perpetrators typically have more physical, social, and/or psychological power than the victim. It is a widely accepted serious societal problem in recent decades in many countries, especially where weapons such as guns or knives are involved.

== Forms of school violence and different types of bullying ==
School violence occurs in all countries and affects a significant number of children and adolescents. It is mostly perpetrated by peers but, in some cases, is perpetrated by teachers and other school staff. School violence includes physical, psychological and sexual violence.

=== Bullying ===
Bullying, in its broadest sense, can be defined as a form of aggressive behavior characterized by unwelcome and negative actions. It entails a recurring pattern of incidents over time, as opposed to isolated conflicts, and typically manifests in situations where there exists an imbalance of power or strength among the individuals involved. It is important to distinguish bullying from occasional conflicts or disagreements that may arise among peers.

Various forms of bullying exist, including physical, psychological, sexual, and cyber-bullying.

- Physical bullying encompasses a series of aggressive acts, such as physical assault, injury, kicking, pushing, shoving, confinement, theft of personal belongings, destruction of possessions, or coerced participation in undesirable activities. Physical bullying differs from other types of physical violence, such as fights or attacks.
- Psychological bullying entails verbal abuse, emotional abuse, as well as social exclusion. This form of bullying includes derogatory name-calling, malicious teasing, deliberate exclusion from activities, purposeful neglect or ignorance, and the spread of lies or rumors.
- Sexual bullying involves subjecting an individual to ridicule through sexual jokes, comments, or gestures, causing embarrassment or discomfort.
- Cyber-bullying refers to bullying that takes place through electronic means. This can involve receiving mean-spirited instant messages, posts, emails, or text messages, or the creation of websites intended to mock or ridicule a particular student. Additionally, cyber-bullying encompasses the unauthorized capture and online dissemination of unflattering or inappropriate images of a student, as well as hurtful or malicious behavior through mobile phones (such as texts, calls, or video clips) or online platforms (including email, instant messaging, social networking sites, and chatrooms).

=== Physical fights ===
According to the Global School-based Student Health Survey (GSSHS), a physical fight "occurs when two students of about the same strength or power choose to fight each other" and therefore is a form of physical violence between peers. The Health Behavior in School-aged Children (HBSC) does not refer specifically to school-related violence or to violence between peers, as it can occur between a student and "a total stranger, a parent of other adult family member, a brother or sister, a boyfriend or girlfriend or date, a friend or someone known by the student".

=== Sexual violence ===
According to Demographic and Health Survey (DHS), sexual violence is forced sexual intercourse or any other sexual acts against one's will. Violence Against Children Survey (VACS) defines it as completed non-consensual sex acts (such as rape), attempted non-consensual sex acts, abusive sexual contact (such as unwanted touching), and non-contact sexual abuse (such as threatened sexual violence, exhibitionism, and verbal sexual harassment).

=== Physical violence perpetrated by teachers ===
This is defined as the intentional use of physical force with the potential to cause death, disability, injury or harm, regardless of whether it is used as a form of punishment.

=== Corporal punishment perpetrated by teachers ===
In school, corporal punishment is defined as any punishment in which physical force is used against a student and intended to cause some degree of pain or discomfort. This often involves hitting children with a hand or implement, but it can also involve kicking, shaking, throwing or scratching children. Since the Ingraham v. Wright ruling in 1977 a growing opposition to School corporal punishment in the United States has led most states to ban it. In April of 2023 both Colorado and Idaho banned corporal punishment in schools so now there are only seventeen states still allowing it in schools and two of them, North Carolina and Kentucky, have bans in all counties, even though it's still allowed statewide, or in Private Schools.

== Risk factors ==
=== Internalizing and externalizing behaviors ===
A distinction is made between internalizing and externalizing behavior. Internalizing behaviors reflect withdrawal, inhibition, anxiety, and/or depression. Internalizing behavior has been found in some cases of youth violence although in some youth, depression is associated with substance abuse. Because they rarely act out, students with internalizing problems are often overlooked by school personnel. Externalizing behaviors refer to delinquent activities, aggression, and hyperactivity. Unlike internalizing behaviors, externalizing behaviors include, or are directly linked to, violent episodes. Violent behaviors such as punching and kicking are often learned from observing others. Just as externalizing behaviors are observed outside of school, such behaviors also observed in schools.

=== Other individual factors ===
A number of other individual factors are associated with higher levels of aggressiveness. Compared to children whose antisocial conduct begins in adolescence, early starters have a worse prognosis in terms of future aggression and other antisocial activities. Lower IQ seems to be related to higher levels of aggression. Other findings indicate that motor, attention, and reading problems predict later persistent antisocial conduct in boys.

=== Home environment ===
The influence of the home environment on school violence has been a subject of study from the Constitutional Rights Foundation. According to this foundation, various factors within the home contribute to the acceptance of criminal and violent behavior among children. Long-term exposure to gun violence, parental alcoholism, domestic violence, physical abuse, and child sexual abuse all play a role in shaping children's perception of acceptability regarding such activities. Research indicates a correlation between harsh parental discipline and increased levels of aggression in youth. Additionally, exposure to violence on television and, to a lesser extent, violent video games has been linked to heightened aggressiveness in children. These aggressive tendencies can carry over into school environments.

One line of research, led by Straus, suggests that parental corporal punishment heightens the risk of aggressive behavior in children and adolescents. However, these findings have been challenged by Larzelere and Baumrind. Nonetheless, a comprehensive meta-analysis of numerous studies on corporal punishment suggests that it leads to unfavorable outcomes for children and young people. The most methodologically sound studies demonstrate a "positive, moderately sized association between parental corporal punishment and children's aggression". Gershoff found that the trajectory of mean effect sizes (the size of the effect of corporal punishment on children's problem behavior) was curvilinear with the largest mean effect size in middle school (M = 0.55; on average the mean of corporal punishment group was more than half a standard deviation higher than the mean of the non-punishment group) and slightly smaller effect sizes in elementary school (M = 0.43) and high school (M = 0.45).

Another influential model in understanding the development of aggressive behavior is Gerald Patterson's social interactional model. This model highlights the dynamic between the mother's use of coercive behaviors and the child's counter-application of such behaviors. Coercive behaviors can include actions that are typically punishing, such as whining, yelling, and hitting. Abusive home environments can hinder the development of social cognitive skills necessary for understanding others' intentions. Short-term longitudinal evidence supports the idea that a lack of social cognitive skills mediates the relationship between harsh parental discipline and aggressive behavior in kindergarten. Follow-up studies indicate that the mediating effects persist until third and fourth grade.

Hirschi's control theory, proposed in 1969, suggests that children with weak emotional bonds to their parents and school are more likely to engage in delinquent and violent behavior both within and outside of the school setting. Hirschi's cross-sectional data from northern California largely support this view. Findings from case-control and longitudinal studies also align with this perspective.

=== Neighbourhood environment ===
Neighbourhoods and communities provide the context for school violence. Communities with high rates of crime and drug use teach youth the violent behaviors that are carried into schools. Children in violent neighborhoods tend to perceive that their communities are risky, and that these feelings of vulnerability carry over to the school environment. Dilapidated housing in the neighbourhood of the school has been found to be associated with school violence. Teacher assault was more likely to occur in schools located in high-crime neighbourhoods. Exposure to deviant peers is a risk factor for high levels of aggressivity. Research has shown that poverty and high population densities are associated with higher rates of school violence. Controlled longitudinal research indicates that children's exposure to community violence during the early elementary school years increases the risk of aggression later in elementary school, as reported by teachers and classmates. Other, well controlled longitudinal research that utilized propensity score matching indicates that exposure to gun violence in early adolescence is related to the initiation of serious physical violence in later adolescence. Neighbourhood gangs are thought to contribute to dangerous school environments. Gangs use the social environment of the school to recruit members and interact with opposing groups, with gang violence carrying over from neighbourhoods into some schools. Alternatively, many children who grow up in violent neighborhoods learn to deliberately find and make "street-oriented" friends as an instrumental tactic used to avoid being victimized. Without the threat of violence, children more commonly develop friendships based on homophily, or shared traits.

=== School environment ===
Recent research has linked the school environment to school violence. Teacher assaults are associated with a higher percentage of the male faculty, a higher proportion of male students, and a higher proportion of students receiving free or reduced cost lunch (an indicator of poverty). In general, a large male population, higher grade levels, a history of high levels of disciplinary problems in the school, high student to teacher ratios, and an urban location are related to violence in schools. In students, academic performance is inversely related to antisocial conduct. The research by Hirschi and others, cited above in the section on the home environment, is also consistent with the view that lack of attachment to school is associated with increased risk of antisocial conduct.

== Prevention and intervention ==
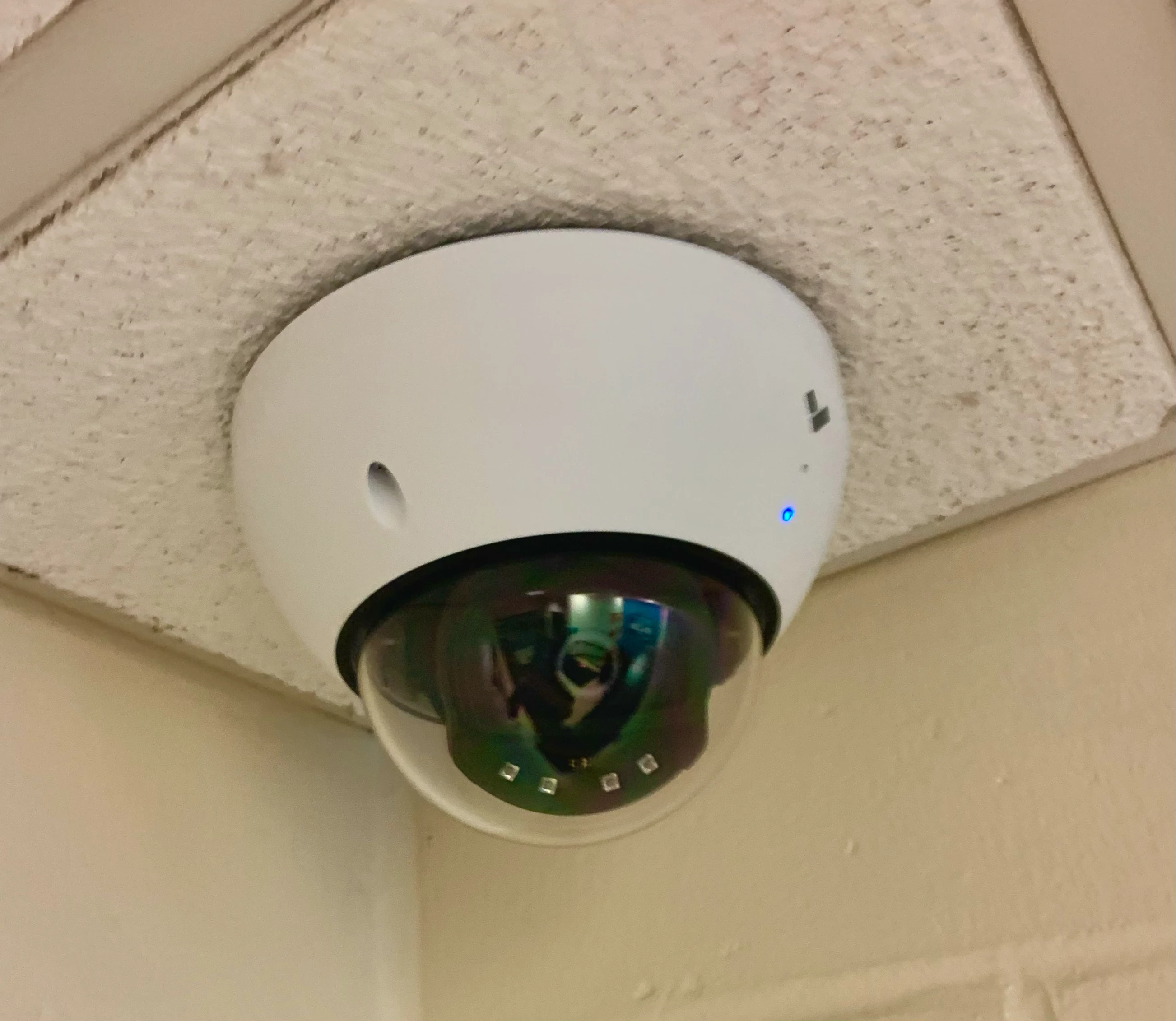
Security camera mounted from the drop ceiling

The goal of prevention and intervention strategies is to stop school violence from occurring. According to the CDC, there are at least four levels at which violence-prevention programs can act: at the level of society in general, the school community, the family, and the individual.

- Society-level prevention strategies aim to change social and cultural conditions in order to reduce violence regardless of where the violence occurs. Examples include reducing media violence, reshaping social norms, and restructuring educational systems. The strategies are rarely used and difficult to implement.
  - Now Is The Time is a US federal initiative developed in 2013 in response to the growing number of gun related school violence incidents. The initiative will provide funding and resources to schools in an effort to reduce gun violence in schools. Funding will be provided for implementation of school interventions and training teachers and staff, programs that will support the mental and physical health of students, conflict resolution programs to reduce further school violence, and restoration of school environment after a violent incident.
- School-wide strategies are designed to modify the school characteristics that are associated with violence. An avenue of psychological research is the reduction of violence and incivility, particularly the development of interventions at the level of the school. The CDC suggests schools promote classroom management techniques, cooperative learning, and close student supervision. At the elementary school level, the group behavioral intervention known as the Good Behavior Game helps reduce classroom disruption and promotes prosocial classroom interactions. There is some evidence that the Second Step curriculum, which is concerned with promoting impulse control and empathy among second and third graders, produces reductions in physically aggressive behavior. Other school-wide strategies are aimed at reducing or eliminating bullying and organizing the local police to better combat gang violence.
  - The implementation of school-wide early-warning systems, the school equivalent of a DEW Line-like surveillance operation designed to "prevent the worst cases of school violence," has been problematic. Recent developments in early threat assessment, however, show promise. Violence-prevention efforts can also be usefully directed at developing anti-bullying programs, helping teachers with classroom-management strategies, applying behavioral strategies such as the Good Behavior Game, implementing curricular innovations such as the Second Step syllabus, developing programs to strengthen families (see below), and implementing programs aimed at enhancing the social and academic skills of at-risk students (see below).
- Teachers are the professional group who works directly where school bullying takes place and who spends the most time with both bullies, victims and bystanders. Thus, whether and how teachers intervene in the case of bullying is of great importance. Research has shown that teachers prefer authority-based interventions towards bullies but seem to neglect to support the victims. Unfortunately, teacher training curricula tend not to include preventive and interventive skills regarding school violence. It has been shown that teachers who set limits and make it clear that previous behavior is in no way acceptable, and also involve the school administration, can reduce problematic behavior. Discussing the issue with the entire class can also lead to positive preventive effects.

Not only does physical violence in schools affect its victims, it also affects the witnesses. In elementary schools, young students tend to copy their peers actions in schools, which may lead to more physical harm towards other students.

- Some intervention programs are aimed at improving family relationships. There is some evidence that such intervention strategies have modest effects on the behavior of children in the short and long term. Patterson's home intervention program involving mothers has been shown to reduce aggressive conduct in children. An important question concerns the extent to which the influence of the program carries over into the child's conduct in school.
- Some prevention and intervention programs focus on individual-level strategies. These programs are aimed at students who exhibit aggression and violent behaviors or are at risk for engaging in such behaviors. Some programs include conflict resolution and team problem-solving. Other programs teach students social skills. The Conduct Problems Prevention Research Group, while developing and implementing a universal anti-aggression component for all elementary school children, also developed and implemented a separate social-skills and academic tutoring component that targets children who are the most at risk for engaging in aggressive behavior.
- Bullying prevention programs such as Olweus provides materials for educators that will train them on how to mediate a bullying situation as well as procedures to take if a child is suicidal.

== Challenges in measuring violence in schools ==
According to a UNESCO report on school violence and bullying, research on violence affecting children in schools is challenging for a variety of reasons.

=== Methodological issues ===
When assessing the extent of violence within educational settings and understanding the various types of violence experienced by students, several crucial considerations arise. These include determining the sources of data within the school community, specifying the data to be collected from each source, and selecting appropriate methodologies for data collection.

One significant question is whether researchers should directly inquire about violence in schools by engaging students in studies or surveys. These methods might involve self-reports from students regarding their personal experiences as victims or perpetrators of violence. Alternatively, researchers may ask students about instances of violence they have observed as bystanders. Moreover, the choice of administering these questions through self-administered questionnaires or researcher-administered surveys within schools must also be deliberated.

According to the UNESCO report, the decision regarding data collection location is another aspect to consider. Researchers may contemplate gathering data outside of schools, such as through household surveys. Alternatively, online surveys could be employed, taking advantage of students' internet accessibility. Another option is to rely on existing mechanisms for reporting violent incidents in educational institutions. These mechanisms could be internal to the schools themselves or external, encompassing governmental hotlines, internet-based reporting systems, and involvement from the police and justice sectors. When formulating questions for children, UNESCO argues that it is imperative to use terminology that is easily understandable, age-appropriate and culturally sensitive. This ensures that the queries are comprehensible and relevant to the target audience, taking into account their developmental stage and cultural context.

=== Legal and ethical issues ===
In many countries, strict regulations govern research involving children due to their status as minors who are unable to provide legal consent. Consequently, obtaining informed consent for a study necessitates the involvement of parents and legal guardians. However, broaching the subject of violence with children, particularly inquiring about their personal experiences, can potentially be distressing and traumatic. Moreover, investigating matters concerning sexual orientation and gender identity within the realm of education, specifically in relation to children, presents additional challenges. In certain contexts, discussing these topics is legally prohibited both within and outside educational institutions. Even in cases where it is legally permissible, addressing issues related to sexual orientation and gender identity/orientation in education with children and young people is regarded as highly sensitive. Considerations of ethical implications arise, as engaging children and young people in discussions regarding their sexual orientation and gender identity in a school setting may lead to embarrassment and expose them to potential stigma and discrimination.

To mitigate these concerns, UNESCO argues that questions regarding sexual orientation and gender identity should be handled with care and recommends that inquiries be conducted under confidentiality and anonymity, external to the school environment.

== See also ==
- Childnet
- Cyber-bullying
- Gun violence
- List of school-related attacks
- School discipline
- School resource officer
- School security
- School shooting
- School violence in Australia
- School violence in Belgium
- School violence in Bulgaria
- School violence in France
- School violence in Japan
- School violence in Poland
- School violence in South Africa
- School violence in the Philippines
- School violence in the United Kingdom
- School violence in the United States
- School violence prevention through education
- School-to-prison pipeline
- Suicide of Megan Meier
- School-related gender-based violence (SRGBV)
- Teacher burnout
- Violence
- Violent extremism
- International day against violence and bullying at school including cyberbullying

== Sources ==
- This article incorporates text from a free content work. Licensed under CC-BY-SA IGO 3.0 (license statement/permission). Text taken from School Violence and Bullying: Global Status Report, 9, 110-111, UNESCO, UNESCO. UNESCO.
- This article incorporates text from a free content work. Licensed under CC BY-SA 3.0 IGO. Text taken from Behind the numbers: ending school violence and bullying, 70, UNESCO, UNESCO. UNESCO.
