= Positive handling =

Term for physical restraint in special education

Positive handling is a term used in British primary and special-needs education for the use of force and physical restraint of students.

It has also been defined as "the application of force with the intention of overpowering the child".

Positive handling has been described as a "difficult behaviour management strategy" and as "risk-reduced physical interventions that form part of the holistic response". The term has been in use since at least 2000.

Under Section 93 of the Education and Inspections Act 2006, school staff are legally authorized to use reasonable physical force to prevent or stop a pupil from: causing injury to themselves or others; committing a criminal offence; damaging property; or "prejudicing the maintenance of good order and discipline at the school or among any pupils receiving education at the school, whether during a teaching session or otherwise." There is no legal definition of what qualifies as "reasonable" physical force. However, as corporal punishment in schools is illegal in the UK, it can not be used as a form of punishment, and the law states that it "does not authorise anything to be done in relation to a pupil which constitutes the giving of corporal punishment" as defined by the Education Act 1996.

Positive handling refers to a graduated approach towards the control of extreme behaviour by adopting the least intrusive intervention for the shortest period of time, beginning with verbal, non-physical de-escalation techniques first. Guidance on positive handling generally recommends physical intervention only as a last resort.

School staff require training, which is also a legal obligation of teaching institutions. They are also required to document and maintain a record of incidents.

Positive Handling is a statutory and mandatory training, in accordance to Section 2 and 3 of the Health and Safety at Work etc. Act 1974.

It represents a significant investment and undertaking for all staff. Increasingly, staff and managers have expressed the need to acknowledge existing understanding and experience due to raising violence in schools.

The both term itself and the use of physical restraint are the subject of some controversy. Ollie Frith, in an article for the Crisis Prevention Institute, stressed the importance of clear and precise language, saying "it makes no sense that something as extreme as physical or environmental restraint can be labelled 'positive'" and that "even if restraint is necessary, softening the terms or describing such interventions as 'positive' is not helpful and does not convey the seriousness of the situation". Frith as wrote that by "simply offering basic restraint training" schools risk "siloing the issue by giving teachers a route to an outcome in a moment of crisis without trying to identify the problems leading up to it."
