= School bullying =

Bullying in an educational setting

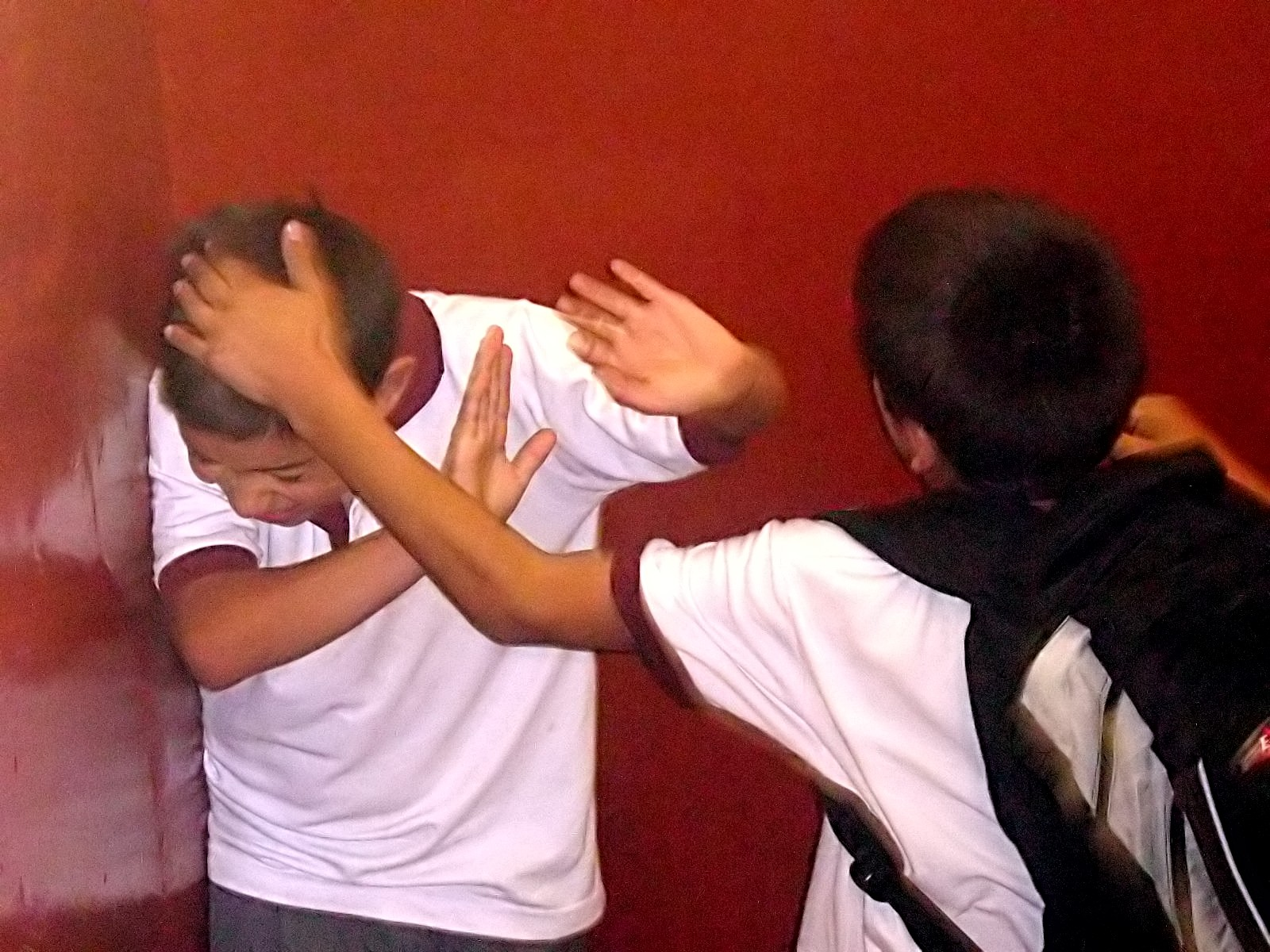
Bullying, one form of which is depicted in this photograph, is detrimental to students' well-being and neurological development.

School bullying, like bullying outside the school context, refers to one or more perpetrators who have greater physical strength or more social power than their selected victim and who repeatedly act aggressively toward them. Bullying can be verbal or physical. Bullying, with its ongoing character, is distinct from one-off types of peer conflict. Different types of school bullying include ongoing physical, emotional, and/or verbal aggression. Cyberbullying and sexual bullying are also types of bullying. Bullying exists in lower or in higher education. There are warning signs that suggest that a child is being bullied, a child is acting as a bully, or a child has witnessed bullying at school.

The cost of school violence is significant across many nations but there are educational leaders who have had success in reducing school bullying by implementing certain strategies. Some strategies used to reduce or prevent school bullying include educating the students about bullying, restricting of recording devices in the classroom, employing security technology, and hiring school safety officers. How schools respond to bullying, however, varies widely. Effects on the victims of school bullying include feelings of depression, anxiety, anger, stress, helplessness, and reduced school performance. Empirical research by Sameer Hinduja and Justin Patchin involving a national sample of US youth have found that some victims of school bullying have attempted to commit suicide, and have committed suicide.

This behavior is not a one-off episode; it must be repetitive and habitual to be considered bullying. Students who are LGBTQ, have parents of lower educational levels, are thought to be provocative, are perceived to be vulnerable, or are atypical or considered outsiders are at higher risk of being victimized by bullies. Baron (1977) defined such "aggressive behaviour as behaviour that is directed towards the goal of harming or injuring another living being who is motivated to avoid such treatment".

Historically, Thomas Hughes's 1857 novel Tom Brown's School Days details intensive school bullying, but the first major scholarly journal article to address school bullying appears to have been written in 1897. Research in school bullying has dramatically expanded over time, rising from 62 citations in the 90 years between 1900 and 1990, to 562 in the 4 years between 2000 and 2004. Since 2004, research on school bullying has mushroomed.

== Criteria ==
Bullying is a subcategory of aggressive behavior that is characterised by hostile intent (the harm caused is deliberate), imbalance of power (real or perceived power inequality between bully and victim), and repetition over a period of time. More ordinary types of student-student conflicts, which are sometimes part of everyday school life, are not associated with an imbalance of power. In contrast to more ordinary conflicts, school bullying can severely harm victimized students.

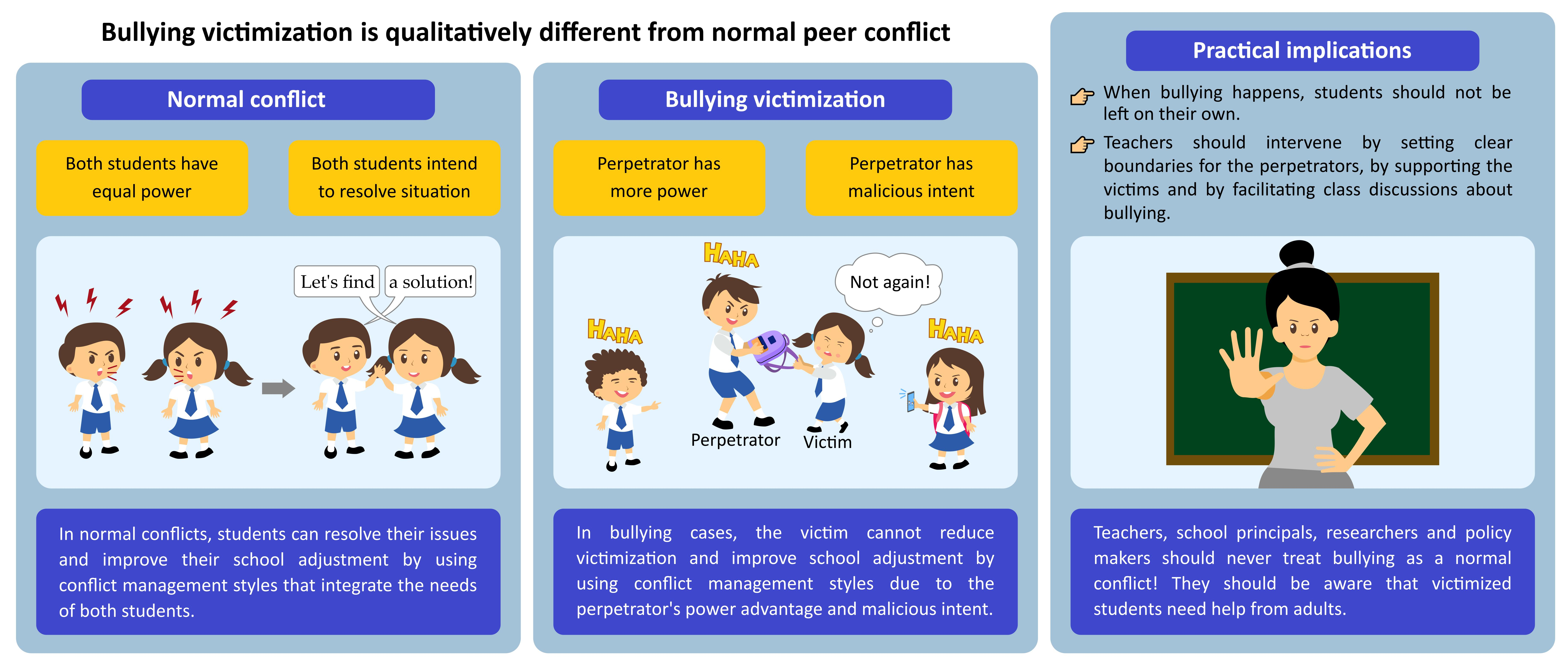
Difference between normal peer conflicts and bullying victimization and implications for teachers

== Power imbalance ==
By definition, bullying involves an imbalance of power. A bully has power over another student because of factors such as size, gender, age, standing among peers, and/or assistance by other students. Among boys, bullying tends to involve differences in strength; among girls bullying is more focused on differences in physical appearance, emotional life, and/or academic status.

Some bullies target peers with physical impairments, such as speech impediments (e.g., stuttering). Many stutterers experience some degree of bullying, harassment, or ridicule from peers and, sometimes, teachers.

== Warning signs ==
Signs that a child is being bullied may include:

- unexplainable injuries,
- symptoms of anxiety and post-traumatic stress,
- lost or destroyed clothing or other objects,
- changes in eating habits,
- declining grades,
- continual school absences,
- self-harm,
- suicidal ideations,
- becoming overly apologetic.

Signs that a child is bullying others may include:

- getting into physical or verbal fights,
- getting sent to the principal's office frequently
- having friends who bully others, and being problematic
- becoming increasingly aggressive in normal activities.

Signs that a child has witnessed bullying include:

- poor school behavior,
- emotional disturbance,
- depression,
- post-traumatic stress,
- drug and alcohol abuse, and
- suicidal ideation.

== Control of bullying ==
There are two main methods employed in controlling bullying: Prevention (acting before something happens) or reaction (acting when something is happening or has just happened).

Preventative solutions may include:

- Education: The education of students, parents, and teachers as to what constitutes bullying may help people understand the harmful nature of bullying. Teachers, school bus drivers, and other school professionals are taught how and when to intervene. Examples of activities used to teach students about bullying include: presentations, role-play, discussions about identifying and reporting bullying, teaching bystanders how and when to help, use of arts and crafts to build understanding of the effects of bullying, and classroom meetings to talk about peer relations. Furthermore, there are some actions such as dialogic conflict prevention and resolution that have been demonstrated to be effective in reducing violence rates and improving coexistence in different scholar contexts. It involves all community, including not only the aggressor and the victim but also spectators, as it has been proved that they have an important role in this violent situation.
- Restrictions on recording devices: It has been suggested that the use of mobile phones can lead to an increase in cyberbullying, which is why some schools have banned them throughout the school day.
- Security technologies: Schools may opt to install video cameras to monitor behaviour. However, skeptics argue that cameras may invade the students' privacy, especially if lax restrictions on the longevity of, and access to, the recordings leads to their misuse.
- Guards in the school: Schools may choose to employ internal security guards or watchmen to ensure the students' safety. Experts believe that the use of security guards inside the schools may assist in reducing incidents of bullying as the guards get to know the students and who may then be able to predict and prevent issues before they arise.

== Types of bullying ==
There are a number of ways in which school bullying takes place. These include verbal, physical, psychological, cyber, and sexual bullying. Direct bullying refers to an open physical or verbal attack on a victim. Indirect bullying is more subtle and harder to detect, but involves one or more forms of relational aggression, including social isolation via intentional exclusion, spreading rumors to defame the target's character or reputation, making faces or obscene gestures behind the target's back, and manipulating friendships or other relationships. Pack bullying is bullying undertaken by a group. There is evidence that pack bullying was more common in high schools than in lower grades and lasts longer than bullying undertaken by individuals.

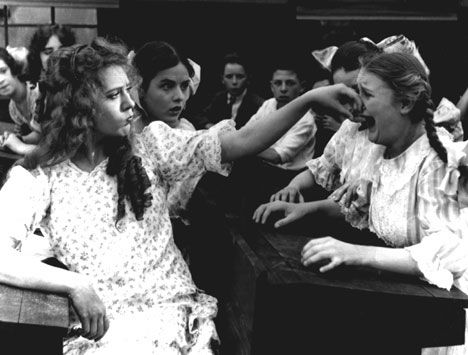
A female bully, portrayed in the 1917 silent film Rebecca of Sunnybrook Farm

=== Physical ===
Physical bullying is any unwanted physical contact between the bully and the victim. This is one of the most easily identifiable forms of bullying. Examples include: fighting, hazing, headlocks, inappropriate touching, kicking, pinching, poking, hair pulling, punching, pushing, slapping, spitting, stalking, or making unwanted and persistent eye contact with a victim, spilling liquids onto a victim, throwing small and lightweight objects at a victim, teasing, threatening, tickling, using weapons including improvised ones, theft and/or damaging of personal belongings.

=== Emotional ===
Emotional bullying is any form of bullying that causes damage to a victim's psyche and/or emotional well-being. Examples include: spreading malicious rumors about people, "ganging up" on others (this could also be considered physical bullying), ignoring people (e.g. the silent treatment or pretending the victim is non-existent), provoking others, belittling or saying hurtful things (which are also forms of verbal bullying).

=== Verbal ===
Verbal bullying are slanderous statements or accusations that cause the victim undue emotional distress. Examples include: foul language or (profanity) directed at the victim; using derogatory terms or deriding the person's name; commenting negatively on someone's looks, clothes, body, etc., (personal abuse); tormenting, harassing, mocking and belittling, threatening to cause harm, taunting, teasing, and making inappropriate sexual comments.

=== Cyberbullying ===
The common use of the internet and technology has resulted in bullying occurring online. According to the website Stop Cyberbullying, schools experience difficulties in controlling off-campus bullying due to the perception that their role does not apply to anything outside of the school. Schools are under pressure to not exceed their authority and to avoid violating students' right to free speech. Suggestions have been made that principals act to include cyberbullying in their code of ethics, allowing disciplining of bullying outside of school facilities and according to Professor Bernard James, "the timidity of educators in this context of emerging technology is working in the advantage of the bullies". Educators do appear to have support from the students. For example, three high school students from Melville, New York, organized a Bullying Awareness Walk, where several hundred people were in attendance.

Researcher Charisse Nixon found that students do not reach out for help with cyberbullying for four main reasons:

- They do not feel connected to the adults around them
- The students do not see cyberbullying as an issue that is worth bringing forward
- They do not feel the surrounding adults have the ability to properly deal with the cyberbullying
- The teenagers have increased feelings of shame and humiliation regarding the cyberbullying.

Research suggests that cyberbullying is sometimes an extension of bullying already taking place elsewhere. Students who are cyberbullied have, in many cases, also been bullied in other ways before (e.g., physically or verbally at school). There are few students who are bullied exclusively over the Internet. Some cyber victims are physically stronger than cyber bullies, which leads these bullies to prefer online confrontations to face-to-face contact.

Cyberbullying is defined as aggressive, intentional act of harm by a group or individual using electronic forms of contact, and it is done repeatedly and over time, against a victim who cannot easily defend themselves. Cyberbullying is a relatively complex and relevant phenomenon during the adolescent age period with serious negative consequences for both victims and aggressors. Research demonstrates that learning experiences of cyberbullying are significantly associated with maladaptive behaviors in school, a general increase in aggression, and maladaptive personality traits.

=== Sexual ===
Sexual bullying is "any bullying behaviour, whether physical or non-physical, that is based on a person's sexuality or gender." A BBC Panorama questionnaire aimed at English teens aged 11 to 19 found that, of the 273 respondents, 28 had been forced to do something sexual, 31 had seen it happen to someone else, and 40 had experienced unwanted touching. U.K. government figures show that in the 2007–2008 school year, there were 3,450 fixed-period exclusions and 120 expulsions from schools in England due to sexual misconduct. This included incidents such as groping and using sexually insulting language. From April 2008 to March 2009, ChildLine counselled a total of 156,729 children, 26,134 of whom spoke about bullying as a main concern and 300 of whom spoke specifically about sexual bullying. Sexting cases are also on the rise and have become a major source of bullying and the circulation of explicit photos of those involved, either around school or on the internet, put the originators in a position to be scorned and bullied. There have been reports of some cases in which the bullying has been so extensive that the victim has taken their life.

== Bullying in higher education ==
About 15 percent of college students claim to have been victims of bullying. The misconception that bullying does not occur in higher education began to receive attention after the suicide of college student Tyler Clementi. According to a recent study, around 21.5% of college students reported rarely being victims of cyberbullying while around 93.3% of students said they rarely cyberbullied others.

== Bullying at private schools ==
A 2020 report in the United Kingdom based on data from the Twins Early Development Study, a sample of twins born between 1994 and 1996 found that private school students were fifteen percent more likely to experience bullying during secondary school (ages eleven through sixteen).

Some of the British boarding schools have become known for bullying as described in a 2019 article in the Guardian as places where students were sent as young as six and the founders of the school thought emotional hardship made students tough when in fact it caused damage known as "boarding school syndrome". The writer meets with his bully in their thirties who apologizes and explains that the bully was also being sexually abused by teachers and senior boys and he took it out on younger students. The political leaders in Britain inevitably came from these schools before they went to Oxford or Cambridge and two Guardian writers attribute issues with British society to these early experiences.

The 2021 USA Today article "Bullying in Private Schools" states that it is hard to say whether private or public schools have worse bullying issues in the United States. A bullying expert Dewey Cornell states in the article, "In practice, bullying occurs everywhere, and it is a question of whether school authorities recognize the problem and make a concerted effort to respond to it or ignore it."

In the U.S. independent (private) schools, the administration has the parents as their main customer as opposed to the public schools that serve the larger society, as Paul Tough illustrates in the 2011 New York Times Magazine article "What if failure is the key to success?"

The private schools also have more autonomy on deciding how to handle bullying where public schools in most states are governed by state law that regulate responses including investigation and require efforts to stop the spread, according to a 2023 New York Times article, "After student's suicide, elite school says it fell 'tragically short.'"

The article describes the $76,000-year boarding school Lawrenceville in New Jersey where 17-year-old Jack Reid killed himself after a persistent false rumor was spread that he was a rapist and the school failed in their duty of care to him both to correct the rumor and to be available to him the night he killed himself. This is a rare admission of guilt following a settlement with Reid's family.

The Latin School of Chicago in 2022 had to create new anti-bullying plans after a 15-year-old committed suicide. The students family filed a lawsuit against the school stating that the school ignored the bullying harm done to their son.

This is the same private school that in 2020 along with many other schools nationwide had alumni accuse the school of racist bullying during their time at the school through an Instagram page Latin Survivors.

Another difference with private schools in the U.S. is that overall they do not have to follow the First Amendment or its hate speech provisions although some states have different laws.

== Girl-on-girl bullying ==
In 2002, "Odd Girl Out: The Hidden Aggression in Girls" by Rachel Simmons broke ground in addressing girl-on-girl bullying where girls fight with "body language and relationships instead of fists and knives".

The 2004 film Mean Girls was based on another seminal 2002 work by Rosalind Wiseman, "Queen Bees and Wannabe: Helping Your Daughter Survive Cliques, Gossip, Boyfriends, and the New Realities of Girl World." This book delves more into all-girls cliques in adolescence as a guide for parents. She and Simmons emphasize that the damage done by adolescent bullying can last into adulthood and have long-term consequences. Wiseman describes a school reality where often the adults don't get it.

Wiseman divides adolescent cliques into types including the Queen Bee (who wields power over the clique and school), the Sidekick (number two who backs up the Queen Bee), Floaters (don't belong to one group), Torn bystanders (often too scared to intervene) and Targets (victim of bullying).

In the 2009 piece "Examining the Invisibility of Girl-to-girl Bullying in Schools: A Call to Action," Susan SooHoo, professor of education at Chapman University, describes how often girl-to-girl bullying can be ignored by teachers. She describes "dehumanizing rituals and practices, passed on from mother to daughter" and how the "othering" bullying by females can continue into adulthood.

At independent and boarding all-girls schools, alumnae can also support girl-on-girl bullying. Miss Porter's school in Farmington, Connecticut was infamous when there was a "mean girls lawsuit" covered in Vanity Fair and one key aspect is that alumnae moms would encourage the bullying on campus by a sanctioned group of older girls.

== Characteristics of bullies ==
Results of one study showed that at age 11, both types of aggressiveness were linked to bullying and victimization, while at age 14, proactive aggressiveness was strongly tied to bullying others but not to being bullied. Gender differences were also observed, with power-related proactive aggression predicting bullying more strongly in boys, and affiliation-related proactive aggression doing so in girls. Bullies have also been reported to have average to higher levels of self confidence. Elevated levels of traits such as sadism also are a factor in a bully's personality.

Other factors associated with being a bully is lower school performance and higher self-esteem.

== Characteristics of victims ==
Victims of bullying tend to be physically smaller, more sensitive, unhappy, cautious, anxious, quiet, and withdrawn. They are sometimes characterized as passive or submissive and might use self-deprecating or self-defeating humor styles. Possessing these qualities makes these individuals vulnerable, as they are seen as being less likely to retaliate. Lack of confidence and mental fragility are also stated to characterize victims.

Another risk factor for becoming a victim is low self-esteem; however, low self-esteem can also be a consequence of having been bullied. Victims of cyberbullying, on the other hand, may not have lower scores than uninvolved students but might have higher body-related self-esteem than both victims of traditional bullying and bullies.

Bullying frequently targets those who, for various reasons, may believe they are defenseless, different, or weak. Being introverted and feeling alone, they just avoid social situations at all costs. Because of this vulnerability, victims of bullying are more likely to experience anxiety, fear, and low self-esteem. The worsening of mental health is another trait of bullied individuals. A variety of emotional problems, including sadness, anxiety, and even post-traumatic stress disorder, can result from persistent teasing and bullying. They are lonely and easily distracted especially in school. The stress and distraction brought on by bullying may also cause victims to do worse academically.

=== Neurodivergent victims ===
Autistic pupils and pupils with ADHD are at a higher risk of being bullied. The University of New South Wales published a study in 2022 that showed that autistic pupils were the most likely of neurodivergent pupils to be bullied. Neurodivergent children are more likely to be bullied than neurotypical children in general. A survey in Canada showed that 77% of autistic pupils reported being bullied. A study across Spain and Italy also showed that pupils with ADHD were more likely to be socially rejected by their peers than their neurotypical counterparts.

The UNSW study showed that autistic pupils were more likely to be bullied at high school than primary school, the reverse of the situation with non-autistic pupils. Autistic pupils without special health care needs are more likely to be bullied than those with special health care needs. Autistic pupils from poorer areas were more likely to be bullied than those from other areas, with the researchers concluding that schools should provide mental health support to pupils from these backgrounds.

== Locations and contexts ==
Bullying locations vary. Most bullying in elementary school happens on the playground. In middle school and high school, it occurs most often in hallways, which have little supervision. According to the U.S Department of Education's National Center for Education Statistics, more than 47% of victims report being bullied in hallways and stairways. Bus stops and bus rides to and from school can also be sites of bullying; children tend to view the driver as someone with no disciplinary authority.

== Roles ==
McNamee and Mercurio state that there is a "bullying triangle", consisting of the person doing the bullying, the victim, and the bystander. Conversely, the US Department of Health and Human Services divides the participants into 7 actors, consisting of the initial "triangle" plus those who assist, those who reinforce the actions of the bully, those who aren't involved but witness the bullying ("outsiders"), and those who come to the assistance of the victim after the fact ("defenders").

== Complex cultural dynamics ==
School bullying might not end with interaction between students; other dynamics may be visible within a school. Students may bully each other or others (teachers, staff, parents), but the students may also experience bullying from teachers or staff. These dynamics may also be in play between staff and teachers, parents and teachers, or any other combination thereof.

== Racism ==
School bullying through racism is common since the earlier 1950s. Bullying students or victims for race can often occur alone or in groups of bullies creating peer pressure. The bullies commonly will make the victim anxious, depressed, or nervous, often leading them to comment suicide (Bullycide). The most targeted victims of race-based bullying are Asians (56.9%), African Amercians (45.9%), Mexican (54%), Slavic (19.2%) Other races: (13%).

== Effects ==
As a result of bullying, victims may feel depressed, anxious, angry, stressed, helpless, out of control, and may experience a significant drop in school performance, or, in rare cases, commit suicide (bullycide). They tend to feel more lonely and have difficulties adjusting to school. Over the long term, they may feel insecure, lack trust, exhibit extreme sensitivity or hypervigilance, develop mental illnesses such as avoidant personality disorder or post-traumatic stress disorder (PTSD), or develop other health challenges.

Victims of bullying may also desire revenge, sometimes leading them to torment others in return or retaliate against their bullies with force. A notable example of the latter was in 2011, when an Australian teenager named Casey Heynes became a viral sensation after throwing to the ground a bully who was punching him, which prompted both widespread public support for Heynes and the concern of some experts.

Anxiety, depression, and psychosomatic symptoms are common among both bullies and their victims. Alcohol and substance abuse are at risk for developing later in life. People suffering from depression often feel better when they talk to others about their lives; victims of bullying, however, may be reluctant to talk to others about their feelings because they fear being bullied for doing so, which can, in turn, worsen their depression. According to Mental Health America, more than 10% of young people exhibit symptoms of depression strong enough to severely undermine their ability to function at school, at home, or whilst managing relationships.

In the short term, bystanders who witnesses bullying may experience anger, fear, guilt, and sadness. If they are witness to regular episodes of bullying, they may begin to exhibit the same symptoms as the victims themselves.

While most bullies, in the long term, grow up to be emotionally functional adults, many have an increased risk of developing antisocial personality disorder, which is linked to an increased risk of committing criminal acts (including domestic violence). Bullies have been shown to have higher levels of loneliness and lower levels of adjustment to school.

=== Educational quality and outcomes ===
The educational effects on victims of school violence and bullying are significant. Violence and bullying at the hands of students may make the victims afraid to go to school and interfere with their ability to concentrate in class or participate in school activities. It can also have similar effects on bystanders. Bullied students may miss classes, avoid school activities, skip school, or drop out of school altogether. Bullied students may also have lower grades, greater academic difficulties, and be less likely to anticipate going on to higher education. International analyses highlight the impact of bullying on learning outcomes, showing that bullying is related to lower achievement. Further, unsafe learning environments create a climate of fear and insecurity and a perception that teachers do not have control or do not care about the students, which reduces the quality of education for all.

=== Social and economic costs ===
The 2006 UN World Report on Violence Against Children shows that victims of corporal punishment, both at school and at home, may develop into adults who are passive and over-cautious or aggressive. Being bullied is also linked to a heightened risk of eating disorders and social and relationship difficulties. A 1958 study of children born in England, Scotland, and Wales looked at 7,771 children who had been bullied at ages 7 and 11 and found that by age 50, those who had been bullied as children were less likely to have obtained school qualifications and were less likely to live with a spouse or partner or to have adequate social support. These victims also scored lower in tests designed to measure cognitive IQ and were more likely to report that they had poor health.

The economic impact of violence against children and adolescents is substantial. Youth violence in Brazil alone is estimated to cost nearly US$19 billion every year, of which US$943 million can be linked to violence in schools, while the estimated cost to the economy in the USA is US$7.9 billion a year. Studies show that school-related gender-based violence alone can be associated with the loss of one primary grade of schooling, which translates to an annual cost of around US$17 billion to low- and middle-income countries. In Cameroon, Democratic Republic of Congo, and Nigeria it is estimated that US$974 million, US$301 million, and US$1,662 million respectively are lost due to failures in the equal education of girls and boys, with violence in school listed as one of the key factors contributing to the under-representation of girls in education. In Argentina, the cost of early dropping out is estimated to be 11.4% of GDP, and in Egypt, nearly 7% of potential earnings is lost as a result of the number of children dropping out of school. It is not clear how much of these preceding losses may be attributable to school bullying.

== Statistics ==
Percentage of boys and girls who experienced bullying in the past 12 months

According to the American Psychological Association, "40% to 80% of school-age children experience bullying at some point during their school careers." Various studies show that students from lower socioeconomic backgrounds and students with disabilities experience bullying more often than other students.

=== Victims ===
- Statistics show that in the U.S. school system 1 in 3 children are affected by bullying in their lifetime, and 30% report being involved in some manner.
- In a 1997 study of five Seattle high schools, students recorded their peers' hallway and classroom conversations. It was discovered that the average high school student hears about 25 anti-gay remarks a day.
- U.S. students who are homosexual, bisexual, or transgender are five times as likely to miss school because they feel unsafe after being bullied due to their sexual orientation or gender identity.
- According to the U.S. Centers for Disease Control and Prevention, the percentage of gay, lesbian, and bisexual students who did not go to school at least one day during the 30 days preceding the survey, due to safety concerns, ranged from 11% to 30% for gay and lesbian students and 12% to 25% for bisexual students.
- 61.1% of LGBTQIA+ middle- or high-school students were more likely than their non-LGBTQIA+ peers to feel unsafe or uncomfortable as a result of their sexual orientation.
- In the United States, a 2013 nationwide survey indicated that 20% of high school students were bullied on school property in the past year, 15% of the students were bullied electronically, and 8% of students ages 12–18 reported ongoing bullying on a weekly basis.
- According to the journal of Evolutionary Psychological Science, victims of bullying are more likely to be sexually inactive compared to bullies.
- In a Canadian study that surveyed 2,186 students across 33 middle and high schools, 49.5% reported being bullied online in the previous three months. 33.7% of the sample reported being the perpetrator of cyberbullying.
- At least 1 in 3 adolescent students in Canada has reported being bullied.
- 47% of Canadian parents report having a child who is a victim of bullying.
- The most common form of cyberbullying involved receiving threatening or aggressive emails or instant messages, reported by 73% of Canadian victims.
- A nationwide survey conducted by Trinity College Dublin, of bullying in first- and second-level schools in Ireland, estimates that some 31% of primary and 16% of secondary students have been bullied at some time.
- In a study of 32 Dutch elementary schools, 16.2% of the 2,766 participating children reported being bullied regularly (at least several times a month).

Statistics referencing the prevalence of bullying in schools may be inaccurate and tend to fluctuate. In a U.S. study of 5,621 students ages 12–18, 64% of the students had experienced bullying and did not report it.

=== Bullies ===
- In a 2005 survey, 3,708,284 students reported being a perpetrator of bullying in the U.S. school system.
- Studies have shown bullies report having more friends than children who are victims.
- Bullying behavior in perpetrators is shown to decrease with age.
- Developmental research suggests bullies are often morally disengaged and use egocentric reasoning strategies.
- Bullies often come from families that use physical forms of discipline. Adolescents who experience violence or aggression in the home, or are influenced by negative peer relationships, are more likely to bully. This suggests that positive social relationships reduce the likelihood of bullying.
- Bullies may show signs of mental health disorders. This trend is most evident in adolescents diagnosed with depression, anxiety, or ADHD.
- Poor theory of mind is associated with bullying.
- Up to 25% of students may encourage bullying, and more than 50% will not intervene in bullying situations.
- A study by Lisa Garby shows that 60% of bullies in middle school will have at least one criminal conviction by the age of 24.
- 10.6% of surveyed children said they sometimes bullied other children (moderate bullying), 8.8% said they had bullied others once a week or more (frequent bullying), and 13% said they had engaged in moderate or frequent bullying of others. 6.3% had experienced bullying and also been a bully.

== School shootings ==
Although research suggests that there might be a weak association between school bullying and school shootings, there is some evidence that having been a victim of school bullying is related to increased risk of a school shootings. The media have portrayed some individuals, such as Dylan Klebold, Charles Andrew Williams, Eric Hainstock, Seung-Hui Cho, Luke Woodham, Michael Carneal, Wellington Menezes Oliveira, Karl Pierson, Jose Reyes, Mitchell Johnson and Andrew Golden, Devon Erickson, Alec McKinney, Todd Camren Smith, and Dylan Jesse Butler as having experienced bullying and then becoming school shooters. However, research suggests that the vast majority of individuals who have been victims of bullying do not become school shooters.

== Emotional intelligence ==
Emotional intelligence is a set of abilities related to the understanding, use and management of emotion as it relates to one's self and others. Mayer et al., (2008) defines the dimensions of overall emotional intelligence as: "accurately perceiving emotion, using emotions to facilitate thought, understanding emotion, and managing emotion". The concept combines emotional and intellectual processes. Lower emotional intelligence appears to be related to involvement in bullying, as the bully and/or the victim of bullying. Emotional intelligence seems to play an important role in both bullying behavior and victimization in bullying; given that emotional intelligence is illustrated to be malleable, emotional intelligence education could greatly improve bullying prevention and intervention initiatives.

One theory is that children who exhibit bullying behaviors are not able to fully understand the impact that they have on their victims. Indeed, when differentiating between the different components of empathy, it is the cognitive component that bullies seem to have the most deficit in. In addition to the inability to relate to the emotions of others, research also suggests that those who engage in bullying behavior may also lack proper skills in dealing with their own emotions, another aspect of emotional intelligence often referred to as emotional facilitation or self-efficacy.

The poor use of emotions is found to be significant in predicting problem behavior among adolescents, such as aggression, which can be characteristic in bullying behavior. In this way, the ability to understand and manage one's own emotions may play an important role in preventing children from engaging in bullying behavior. For example, in a study among adolescent girls, it was found that better management of stress could prevent the perpetuation of aggression and violence.

=== Victimization ===
Emotional intelligence is found to be a significant predictor of variance in adolescent peer victimization in bullying and also has a negative correlation with adolescent bullying. Victim peer relations showed strong negative correlations with the emotional management and facilitation dimensions of emotional intelligence conceptualized as Emotional Management and Control and Emotions Direct Cognitions respectively, both of which made significant semi-partial contributions to the overall model of Emotional Intelligence. These results indicate that victims may have less ability to handle their emotions or to use them to make decisions in response. The inability to manage one's own emotions can lead to rejection, or further rejection, from peers which can help perpetuate victimization and further damage a victim's social skills; peer relationships and support are influential on emotional adjustment.

While some dimensions of emotional intelligence seem more predictive of one status or the other (that of the bully or the victim), there are dimensions of emotional intelligence, such as empathy and self-efficacy, that have significant negative relationships with both. Additionally, emotional intelligence as a whole is significant in predicting for victim status. Thus, victims may also be deficient in the dimensions of emotional intelligence that correlate to becoming a bully, a risk that could be expected to be exacerbated by the damage to one's psycho-social health due to being a victim. Students who experience bullying often have a harder time adapting healthy relationships when they get older. It has been found that there is a negative correlation between bullying and emotional intelligence. People with more emotional intelligence are able to moderate the effects of the bullying they suffer in the workplace and still work efficiently.

Increasing emotional intelligence may be an important step in trying to foster resilience among victims. When a person faces stress and adversity, especially of a repetitive nature, their ability to adapt is an important factor in whether they have a more positive or negative outcome. Resilient individuals are those who are considered to have positive developmental outcomes in light of their negative experiences, such as bullying. Sapouna & Wolke (2013) examined adolescents who illustrated resilience to bullying and found some interesting gendered differences, with higher behavioral resilience found among girls and higher emotional resilience found among boys. Despite these differences, they still implicated internal resources and negative emotionality in either encouraging or being negatively associated with resilience to bullying respectively and urged for the targeting of psychosocial skills as a form of intervention. Emotional Intelligence has been illustrated to promote resilience to stress and as mentioned previously the ability to manage stress and other negative emotions can be preventative of a victim going on to perpetuate aggression. One factor that is important in resilience is the regulation of one's own emotions. Schneider et al. (2013) found that emotional perception was significant in facilitating lower negative emotionality during stress and Emotional Understanding facilitated resilience and has a positive correlation with positive affect.

=== Theoretical contributions of emotional intelligence to the relationship ===
Given lower emotional intelligence, it is also possible that many bullies are more malevolently creative. When original, the acts of aggression and abuse found in both childhood and adult bullying are considered examples of malevolent creativity (MC). Findings suggest that individuals lower in emotional intelligence conceive more malevolently creative solutions, which theoretically leads to more malevolently creative behaviors. (Note: EI predicted MC even after controlling for emotional and social context. There was a negative correlation between EI and MC in both study 1 (r=-.11, p= .076) and study 2 (r= -.24, p=.022); EI also had marginal significance in predicting the number of malevolently creative ideas after controlling for both cognitive ability and instructions (β=-.25, p=0.055).) It is conjectured that people with lower emotional intelligence may not see the impropriety in malevolently creative ideas or disregard how others would perceive them, and thus they have less issue with disclosing such ideas. Given the hypothesis that more malevolently creative solutions should lead to more malevolently creative behaviors, this theory makes sense in light of the deficit in cognitive empathy found in bullying behavior.

There may also be a subtype of bully that is high in callous and unemotional traits (CU). CU traits include some of the discussed deficits in emotional intelligence such as lack of empathy, as well as other traits such as a lack of guilt, shallow capacity for emotion and poor behavioral modulation when faced with punishment. Given that children who bully often have conduct problems, and CU traits are often co-occurring with conduct problems, Viding et al., (2009) investigated the relationship between CU and bullying behavior. Given that previous research suggests children with conduct problems fall into subtypes of those with high CU traits and those without, it was possible that this creates a distinction among bullies. Higher CU was independently correlated to direct bullying, (Note: Direct forms of bullying are those that entail direct contact between the bully and victim, such as physical attack or verbal aggression. Indirect forms of bullying are those that involve other people and are more indirect, such as spreading rumors, or cyber-bullying.) which is associated with lack of empathy, while indirect bullying is not. When combined with conduct problems, CU increased the risk of direct and indirect bullying behaviors. Bullies high in CU traits will probably be resistant to many of the interventions successful with bullies who are not. Although a defining characteristic of CU is a lack of empathy, which overlaps with bullies deficits in empathy as highlighted above, the other characteristics of the concept would make bullies high in CU less malleable than those who simply have lower emotional intelligence.

== Institutional prevention ==
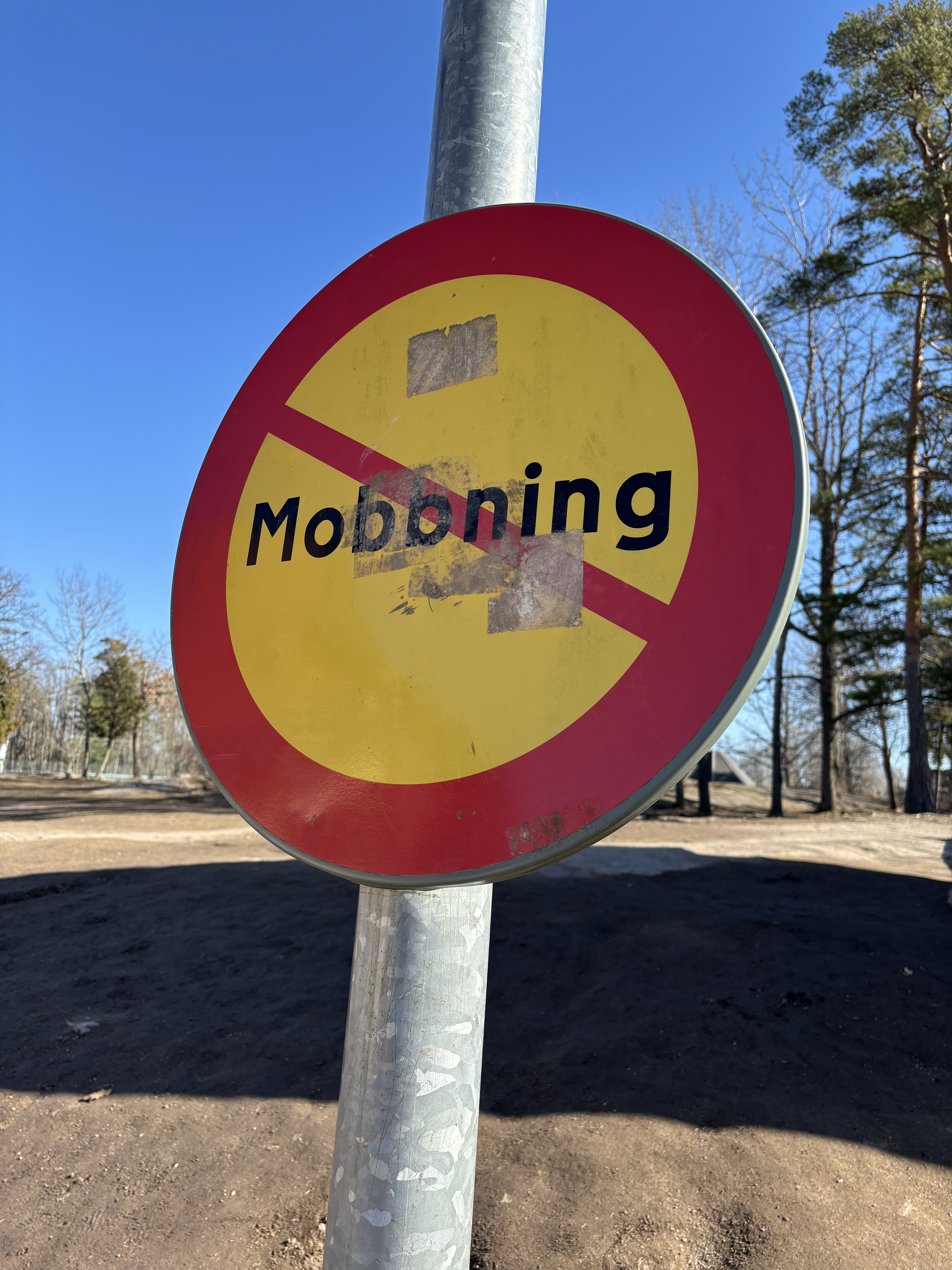
Bullying prohibition sign in a schoolyard in Sweden

Studies have shown that bullying programs set up in schools with the engagement of staff and faculty have been shown to reduce peer victimization and bullying. Incidents of bullying are noticeably reduced when the students themselves disapprove of bullying. Classroom activities where students reflect on bullying decrease the cases of bullying while increasing the communication between students and school staff.

The current literature shows that school-based anti-bullying programs are also effective in reducing bullying perpetration and bullying victimization by ~15%, based on moderate-quality evidence. However, as there is variation in the effectiveness of anti-bullying programs, further research is required to identify specific programmatic features that make programs effective. A 2019 study found that school-based anti-bullying programs may lower the incidence of bullying by as much as 25%.

Measures such as instituting zero tolerance for fighting or placing troubled students in the same group or classroom are actually ineffective in reducing bullying. Methods that are effective include increasing empathy for victims; adopting a program that includes teachers, students, and parents; and having students lead anti-bullying efforts. Success is most associated with beginning interventions at an early age, constantly evaluating programs for effectiveness, and having some students take online classes to avoid bullies at school. Another way to help victims is to provide peer support. Peer support can help a victim improve his or her school performance.

=== Effective national responses ===
Based on UNESCO case studies of six countries that have succeeded in reducing school violence and bullying (Eswatini, Italy, Jamaica, Lebanon, Republic of Korea and Uruguay) as well as two countries that have maintained low levels over time (the Netherlands and Sweden), there are a number of factors that contribute to effective national responses.

Factors that contribute to effective national responses include:

- Political leadership and high-level commitment, together with a robust legal and policy framework that addresses violence against children and school violence and bullying. Many successful countries also have an emphasis in national policies that promote a safe learning environment, a positive school and classroom climate, and a strong commitment to child rights and empowerment.
- Collaboration and partnerships. At the national level, this includes partnerships between the education sector and other sector ministries, civil society organizations, academic institutions, professional associations, and the media. At the school level, it includes partnerships involving all stakeholders in the school community, including head teachers, teachers, other staff, parents and students, local authorities, and professionals in other sectors. More specifically, the involvement of all students, including bystanders, and the use of peer approaches, have been a key factor in countries that have made the most progress.
- Evidence-based approaches, informed by accurate and comprehensive data and systematic evaluation of the effectiveness of existing programmes. Effective systems for routine reporting and monitoring of school violence and bullying and rigorous evaluation of the impact of programmes and interventions are critical. Bullying prevention programs that reach parents through trainings and material sent home, as well as role-playing scenarios that students can work through, have been found as relevant components to reduce the problem behavior according to research from David Finkelhor and colleagues from the University of New Hampshire's Crimes Against Children Center.
- Training and support for teachers and care and support for affected students. Training in successful countries has focused on developing skills to prevent and respond to school violence and bullying and to use positive approaches to classroom management.

The case studies also identified a number of factors that can limit the effectiveness and impact of national responses. These include lack of data on specific aspects of school violence and bullying and on the sub-groups of students who are most vulnerable, low coverage of interventions, lack of systematic monitoring of school violence and bullying, and of robust evaluation of the impact of programmes.

=== Anti-bullying legislation and court rulings ===
==== United Kingdom ====
Section 89 of the Education and Inspections Act 2006 provides for an anti-bullying policy for all state schools to be made available to parents.

==== United States ====
The victims of some school shootings have sued both the shooters' families and the schools. In 2015, Montana became the last state to enact an anti-bullying law. At that point, all 50 states had an anti-bullying law.

==== Canada ====
In 2016, a legal precedent was set by a mother and her son, after the son was bullied at his public school. The mother and son won a court case against the Ottawa-Carleton District School Board, making this the first case in North America where a school board has been found negligent in a bullying case for failing to meet the standard of care ("duty of care") that the school board owes to its students. A similar bullying case was won in Australia in 2013 (Oyston v. St. Patricks College).

==== Taiwan ====
The Ministry of Education has launched a series of projects. In 2006, they started the 'anti-bully plan'. In 2008, they launched the "prevent-bully video from public project"—which included encouraging informants and monitoring the school—in the hope that it could improve education quality.

==== South Africa ====
Bullying is still not recognized as a specific crime in South Africa. However, four laws protect children in South Africa:

- The South African Schools Act 84 of 1996 (SASA)
- The Children's Act 38 of 2005
- The Child Justice Act 75 of 2008
- The Protection from Harassment Act 17 of 2011

==== South Korea ====
In 2004, the Act on the Prevention of and Countermeasures Against Violence in Schools was enacted in South Korea. In the lead-up to its legislation, The Blue Tree Foundation (BTF; Formerly Foundation for Preventing Youth Violence; FPYV), Korea's NGO specializing in school violence prevention, spearheaded a civic movement involving 470,000 citizens.

==== Australia ====
In October 2025, the Australian government released an "anti bullying" report. The report recommended schools to issue reports on incidents within 48 hours following the event. The report also recommends schools to make more effort in observing the bullying as it occurs. The minister of education, Jason Clare, said parents were claiming it was taking the schools too long to act on bullying incidents and in response stated they need to act early and make sure teachers have the appropriate tools and training to respond and address the issue.

=== Philippines ===
The Anti-Bullying Act of 2013 (Republic Act No. 10627) requires elementary and secondary schools in the Philippines to adopt policies to prevent and address bullying. The law covers physical acts, verbal expressions, and cyberbullying, and requires schools to establish procedures for reporting and investigating incidents.

In August 2025, the Department of Education approved revised implementing rules and regulations for the law. The revised rules require standardized anti-bullying policies, school-wide prevention programs, early intervention, and procedures for handling complaints and appeals. They also clarify the responsibilities of school personnel, parents, and learners in preventing and responding to bullying.

A 2025 policy note by the Philippine Institute for Development Studies examined the relationship between bullying and students' schooling outcomes, including class absences and academic performance. It identified effective implementation of existing policies as an important challenge and recommended strengthening prevention and intervention programs and coordination between anti-bullying and mental health policies.

== Portrayal in media ==
American films such as Bully (2011), A Girl Like Her (2015), and Wonder (2017) tend to depict school bullying in terms of physical violence, verbal violence, and emotional trauma, as well as a lack of affection from the family, social apathy, and individual powerlessness. Asian media that portray school bullying include Better Days (2019) and The Glory (2022).

== See also ==
- Amanda Todd
- School climate
- School violence
- School violence prevention through education
- Sexual harassment in education
- School-related gender-based violence (SRGBV)
- Mental health in education
- International day against violence and bullying at school including cyberbullying
- Bullying in teaching

== Sources ==
This article incorporates text from a free content work. Licensed under CC-BY-SA IGO 3.0 (license statement/permission). Text taken from School Violence and Bullying: Global Status Report, 17, 29–31, UNESCO, UNESCO. UNESCO.

This article incorporates text from a free content work. Licensed under CC BY-SA 3.0 IGO. Text taken from Behind the numbers: ending school violence and bullying, 70, UNESCO, UNESCO. UNESCO.
