= International Day against Violence and Bullying at School, including Cyberbullying =

UNESCO holiday

The International Day Against Violence and Bullying at School, including Cyberbullying is a UN Educational, Scientific and Cultural Organization (UNESCO) holiday celebrated every year on the first Thursday of November.

This International Day was designated by the member states of UNESCO in 2019 and it was first held in November 2020.

According to UNICEF, one in three young people in 30 countries have been a victim of online bullying (2019 poll) and half of students aged 13 to 15 experience peer violence around school (2018 report).

In 67 countries, corporal punishment is still allowed in schools.

The UNESCO International day remind people that violence in schools violates the right of children and adolescents to education, health and well-being. The aim is to call on the international community, civil society (including parents, pupils and teachers), the tech industry, the education community and the education authorities to take part in the fight against violence and bullying at school.

== Celebration ==
=== 2022 ===
The 2022 edition emphasized the role of teachers in making schools safe places for everyone. An International seminar on the role of teachers in preventing and addressing school violence and bullying called "Not on my watch" was organized at UNESCO headquarters.

=== 2023 ===
The theme was "No place for fear: Ending school violence for better mental health and learning."

== See also ==
- School violence
- Bullying
- Cyberbullying
- Bullying in teaching
- Anti-bullying legislation
