= Socialization (disambiguation) =

Socialization (or socialisation) refers to the lifelong process of inheriting and disseminating norms, customs and ideologies of a society.

Socialization may also refer to:

- Socialization (economics), the process of establishing social ownership of the means of production and/or a system of production for use
- Socialization (Marxism), the process within capitalism of transforming a solitary economic activity into a collective endeavor
- Socialization of animals, process of training animals to be kept by humans in close relationships
- Political socialization, the study of the developmental processes by which children and adolescents acquire political cognition, attitudes, and behaviors
- Social relation, any relationship between two or more individuals
- Conversation, spontaneous communication between two or more people
- Socialized medicine, particularly the adoption of such a system

== See also ==
- Academic discourse socialization
- Anticipatory socialization
- Consumer socialization
- Primary socialisation
- Reciprocal socialization
- Socialism
