= Parent =

Caregiver of offspring in their own species

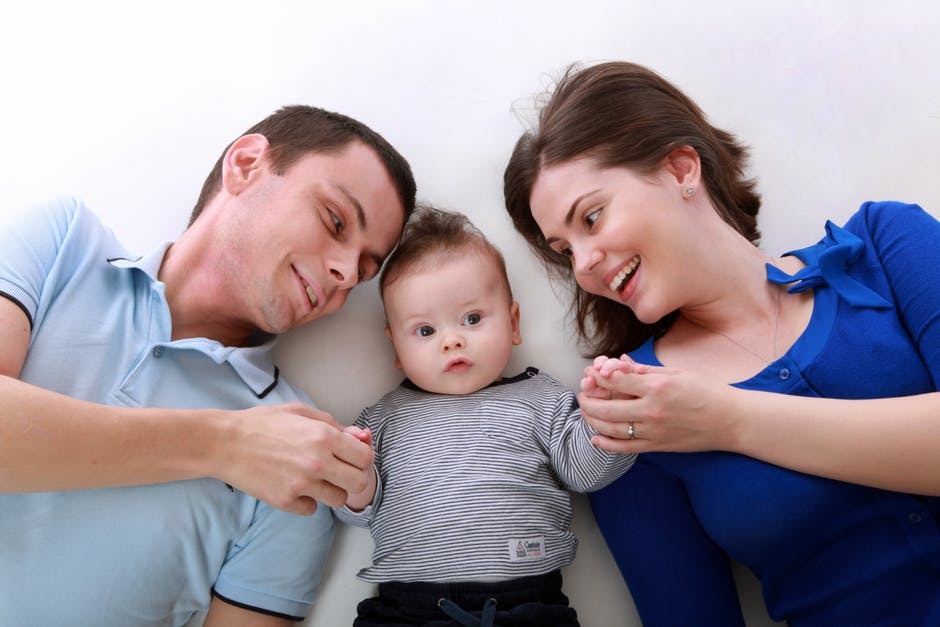
Parents and their child

A parent is either the progenitor of an offspring, or in humans, it can refer to a caregiver or legal guardian, generally called an adoptive parent or step-parent. Parents are first-degree relatives and share 50% of their genes. A female can also become a parent through surrogacy. Some parents may be adoptive parents, who nurture and raise an offspring, but are not related to the child. Orphans without adoptive parents can be raised by their grandparents or other family members.

A parent can also be elaborated as an ancestor removed one generation. With recent advances in medicine, it is possible to have more than two biological parents. Examples of third biological parents include instances involving surrogacy or a third person who has provided DNA samples during an assisted reproductive procedure that has altered the recipients' genetic material.

The most common types of parents are mothers, fathers, step-parents, and grandparents. A mother is "a woman in relation to a child or children to whom she has given birth." The extent to which it is socially acceptable for a parent to be involved in their offspring's life varies from culture to culture, however one that exhibits too little involvement is sometimes said to exhibit child neglect, while one that is too involved is sometimes said to be overprotective, cosseting, nosey, or intrusive.

== Types ==
=== Biological ===
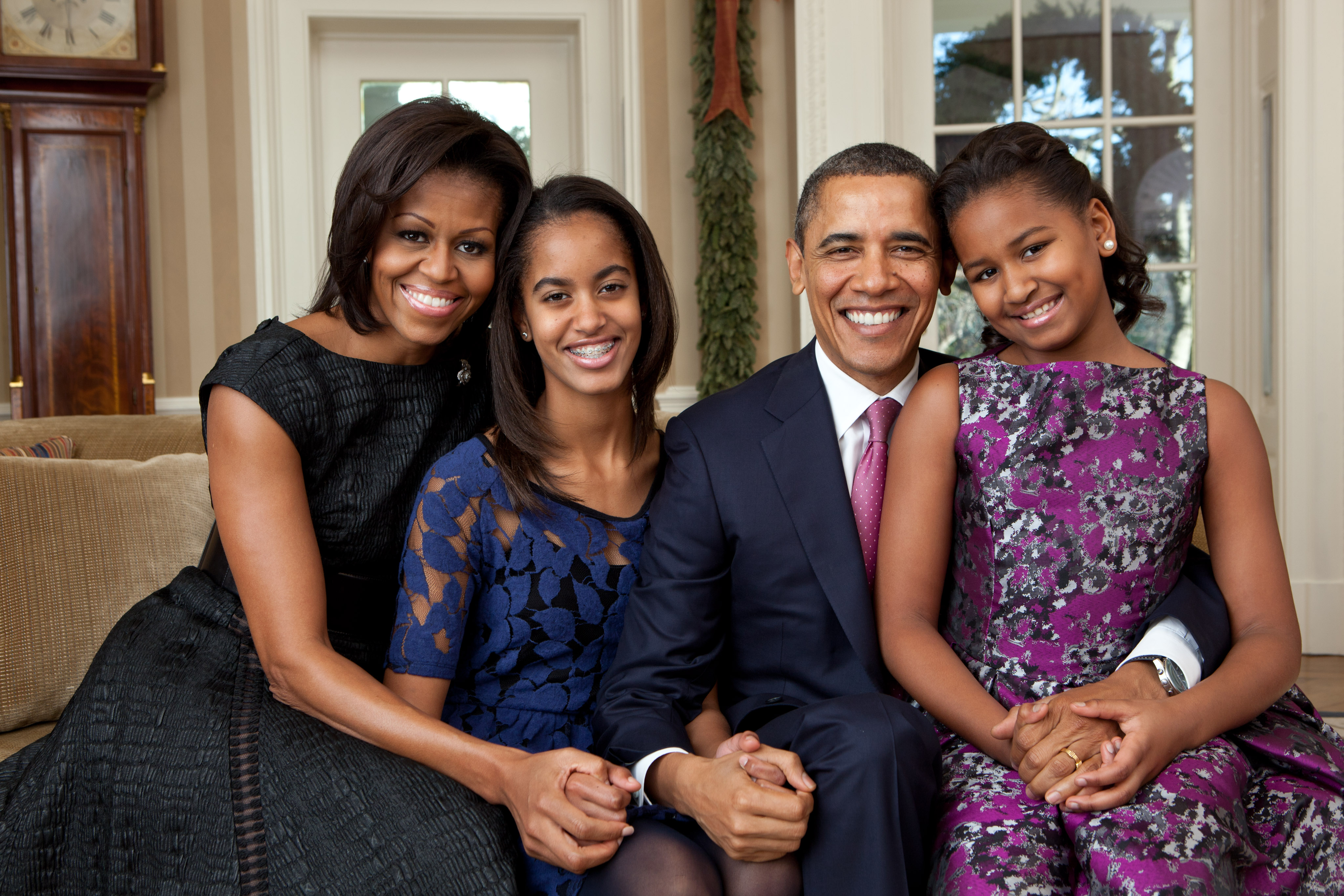
Obama family portrait, 2011

A person's biological parents are the persons from whom the individual inherits their genes. The term is generally used only when it is necessary to distinguish an individual's foster parents from their biological parents. For example, an individual whose father has remarried may refer to the father's new wife as their stepmother and continue to refer to their mother as their mother. However, someone who has had little or no contact with their biological mother may address their foster parent as their mother, and their biological mother as such, or perhaps by her first name.

=== Mother ===
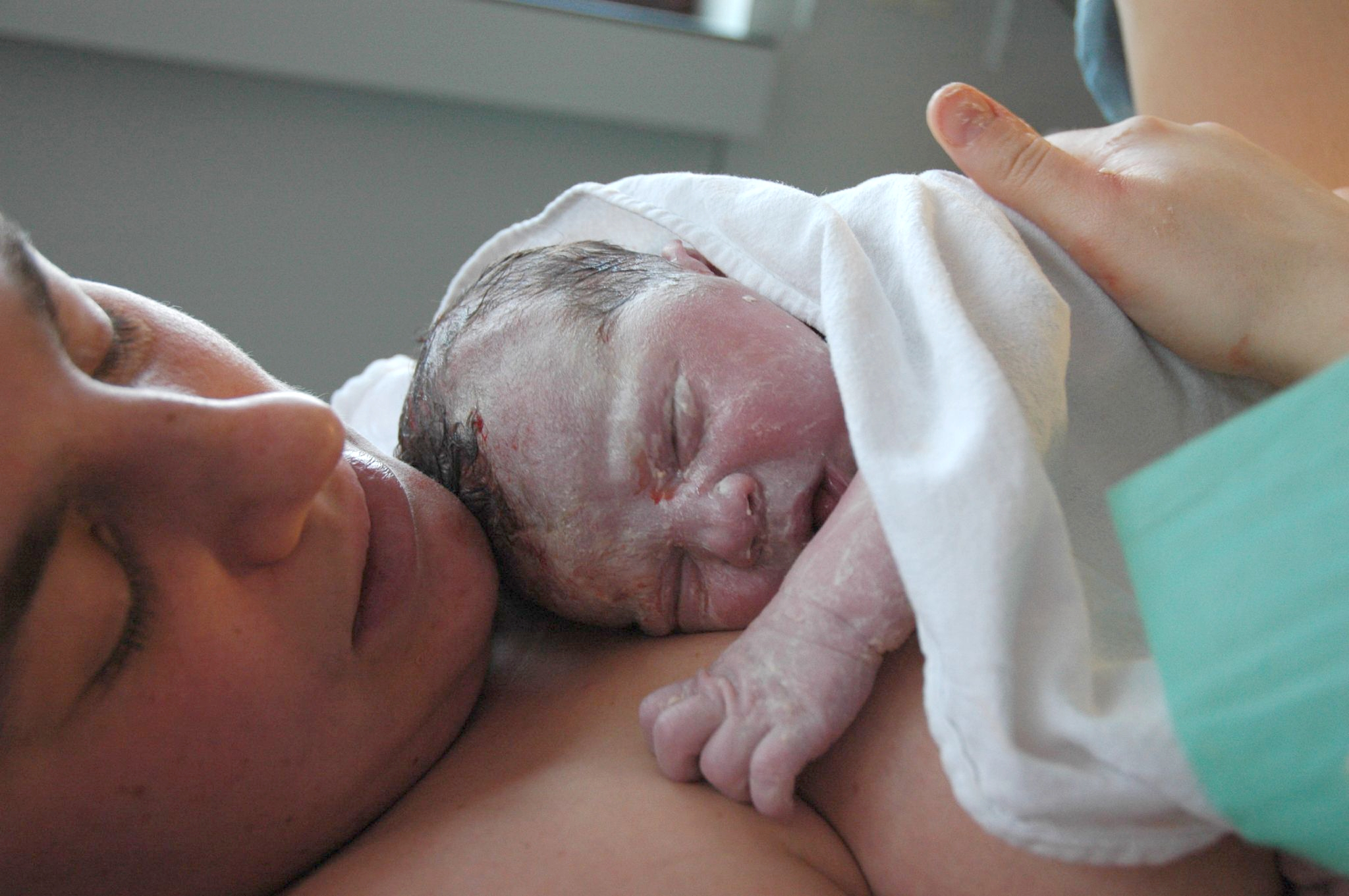
Newborn baby

A mother is a female who has a maternal connection with another individual, whether arising from conception, from giving birth to the individual, or from raising the individual in the role of a parent. More than one female may have such connections with an individual. Because of the complexity and variation in a mother's social, cultural, and religious definitions and roles, it is challenging to define a mother in a way that accords with a universally accepted definition. The utilisation of a surrogate mother may result in explication of there being two biological mothers.

=== Father ===
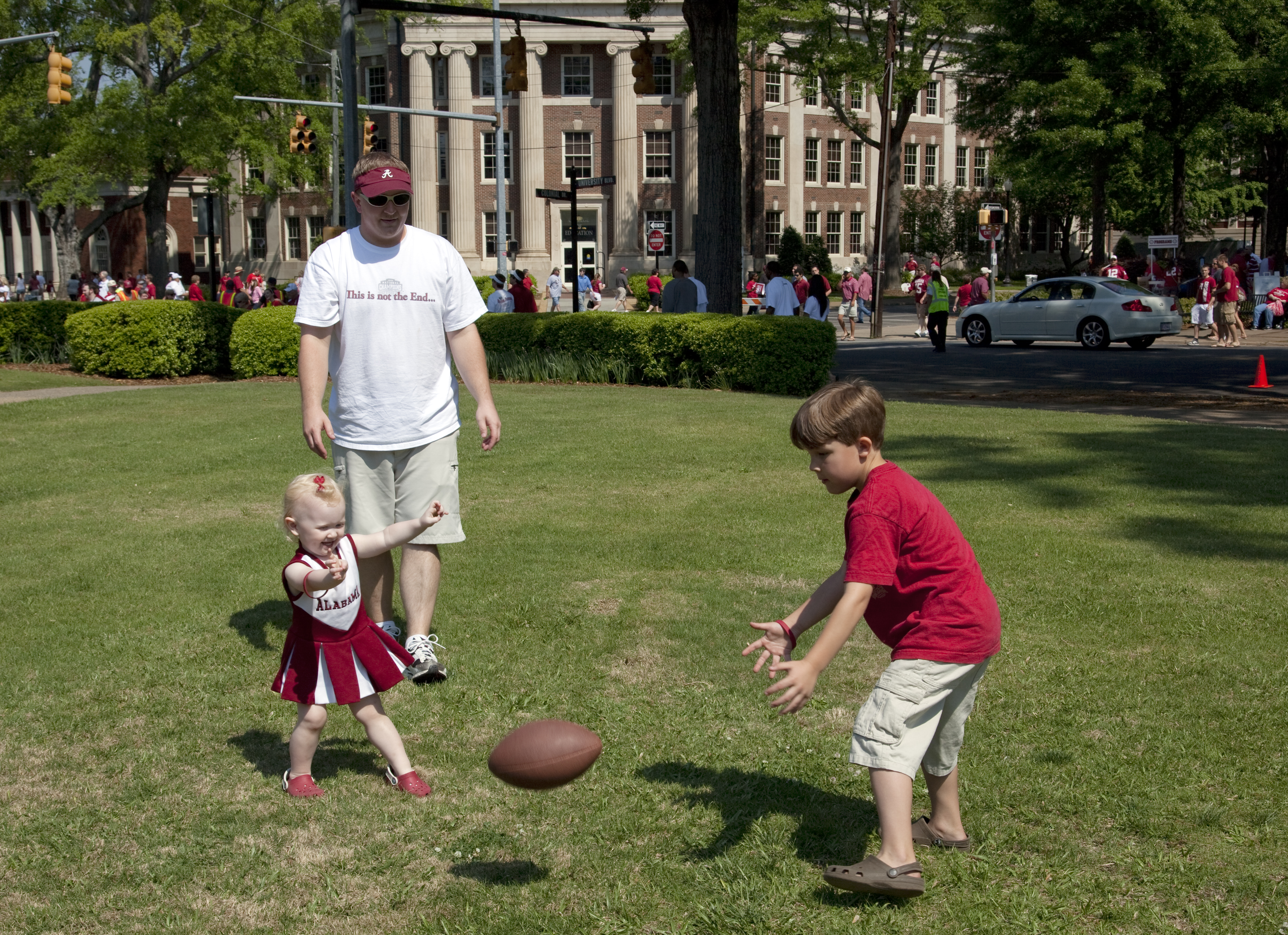
Timothy L. Pesto and Kaitlyn E. Pesto play football as their father watches, Tuscaloosa, Alabama.

A father is a male parent of any offspring. It may be the person who shares in the raising of a child or who has provided the biological material, the sperm, which results in the birth of the child.

=== Grandparent ===
Grandparents are the parents of a person's parent, whether a father or a mother. Every sexually reproducing creature that is not a genetic chimaera has a maximum of four genetic grandparents, eight genetic great-grandparents, sixteen genetic great-great-grandparents and so on. Rarely, such as in the case of sibling or half-sibling incest, these numbers are lower.

== Paternity issues ==
A paternity test is conducted to prove paternity, that is, whether a male is the biological father of another individual. This may be relevant in view of rights and duties of the father. Similarly, a pregnancy test can be performed. This is less common because, at least during childbirth and pregnancy, except in cases of embryo transfer or egg donation, it is obvious who the mother is. However, it is used in several events such as legal battles where a person's maternity is challenged, where the mother is uncertain because she has not seen her child for an extended period of time, or where deceased persons need to be identified.

Although not constituting completely reliable evidence, several congenital traits such as attached earlobes, a widow's peak, or the cleft chin, may serve as tentative indicators of (non-) parenthood as they are readily observable and inherited via autosomal-dominant genes.

A more reliable way to ascertain parenthood is through DNA analysis (also known as genetic fingerprinting). However, older methods have included ABO blood group typing, analysis of various other proteins and enzymes, or using human leukocyte antigens. The current techniques for paternity testing use polymerase chain reaction and restriction fragment length polymorphism. For the most part, however, genetic fingerprinting has largely supplanted other forms of testing.

== Rights and responsibilities ==
=== Guardianship ===
A legal guardian is a person who has the legal authority (and the corresponding duty) to care for the personal and property interests of another person, called a ward. Guardianship is typically used in three situations: guardianship of an incapacitated senior (due to old age or infirmity), guardianship of a minor, and guardianship of developmentally disabled adults.

Most countries and states have laws that provide that the parents of a minor child are the legal guardians of that child, and that the parents can designate who shall become the child's legal guardian in the event of death, subject to the approval of the court. Some jurisdictions allow a parent of a child to exercise the authority of a legal guardian without a formal court appointment. In such circumstances, the parent acting in that capacity is the natural guardian of the child.

=== Parenting ===
Parenting or child rearing is the process of promoting and supporting the physical, emotional, social, financial, and intellectual development of a child from infancy to adulthood. Parenting refers to the aspects of raising a child aside from the biological relationship.

== Gender and gender mix ==
A child has at least one biological father and at least one biological mother, but not every family is a traditional nuclear family. There are many variants, such as adoption, shared parenting, stepfamilies, and LGBT parenting, over which there has been controversy.

As of 2011, social science literature mostly rejects the notion that there is an optimal gender mix of parents or that children and adolescents with same-sex parents suffer any developmental disadvantages compared with those with two opposite-sex parents. The professionals and the major associations agreed in 2009 there is a well-established and accepted consensus in the field that there is no optimal gender combination of parents. The family studies literature indicated in 2011 that it is family processes (such as the quality of parenting and relationships within the family) that contribute to determining children's well-being and "outcomes", rather than family structures, per se, such as the number, gender, sexuality and co-habitation status of parents.

== Genetics ==
=== Parent–offspring conflict ===
An offspring who hates their father is called a misopater; one who hates their mother is a misomater; and a parent who hates their offspring is a misopedist. Parent–offspring conflict describes the evolutionary conflict arising from differences in optimal fitness of parents and their offspring. While parents tend to maximise the number of offspring, offspring can increase their fitness by obtaining a greater share of parental investment, often by competing with their siblings. The theory was proposed by Robert Trivers in 1974 and extends the more general selfish gene theory and has been used to explain many observed biological phenomena. For example, in some bird species. However, parents often lay two eggs and attempt to raise two or more young; the strongest fledgling takes a greater share of the food brought by parents and will often kill the weaker sibling, an act known as siblicide.

=== Empathy ===
David Haig has argued that human fetal genes would be selected to draw more resources from the mother than it would be optimal for the mother to give, a hypothesis that has received empirical support. The placenta, for example, secretes allocrine hormones that decrease the sensitivity of the mother to insulin and thus make a larger supply of blood sugar available to the fetus. The mother responds by increasing the level of insulin in her bloodstream, the placenta has insulin receptors that stimulate the production of insulin-degrading enzymes which counteract this effect.

== Happiness index ==
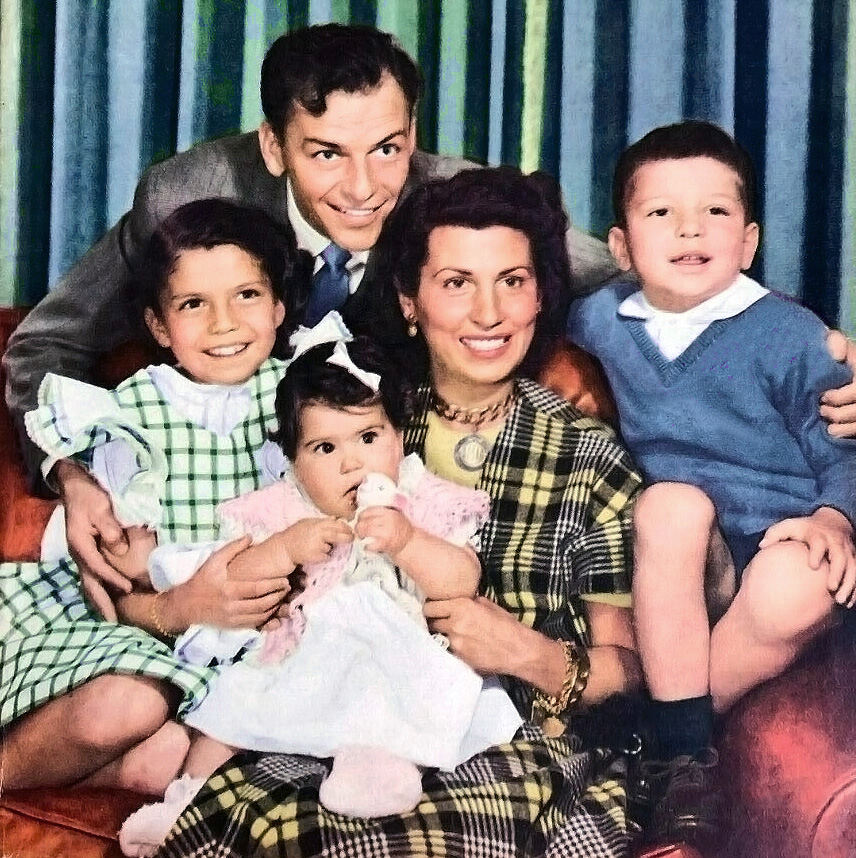
Sinatra family, 1949

In Europe, parents are generally happier than non-parents. Among women, happiness increases after the first child, but having higher-order children is not associated with further increases in well-being. Happiness seems to increase most in the year before and after the first childbirth.

== See also ==
- Adoption
- Bateman's principle
- Child abuse
- Cinderella effect
- Egg and sperm donation
- Foster care
- Infant
- Narcissistic parent
- Non-paternity event
- Parental abuse by children
- Parental age (disambiguation)
- Parental bullying of children
- Parental controls
- Parental investment
- Parental love
- Parental narcissistic abuse
- Parents bullying teachers
- Paternal bond
- Paternity (law)
- Reciprocal socialization
- Stepparent
- Surrogate mother
- Teachers bullying parents
- Honour thy father and thy mother
