= Brand ambassador =

Paid representative of an organization

A brand ambassador (sometimes also called a corporate ambassador) is a person paid by an organization or company to represent its brand in a positive light, helping to increase brand awareness and sales. The brand ambassador is meant to embody the corporate identity in appearance, demeanor, values and ethics. The key element of brand ambassadors is their ability to use promotional strategies that will strengthen the customer-product-service relationship, influence a large audience to buy and consume more.

Predominantly, a brand ambassador is known as a positive spokesperson, an opinion leader or a community influencer, appointed as an internal or external agent to boost product or service sales and create brand awareness. Today, "brand ambassador" as a term has expanded beyond celebrity branding to self-branding or personal brand management. Professional figures, such as good-will and non-profit ambassadors, promotional models, testimonials and brand advocates have formed as an extension of the same concept, taking into account the requirements of every company.

The term brand ambassador loosely refers to a marketing activity which covers all types of event staff, varying between trade show hosts, in-store promotional members and street teams. The job of a brand ambassador has typically been held by a celebrity or a public figure given free goods or paid for their endorsement, now a brand ambassador can be anyone who has knowledge or can identify certain needs of the brand. The brand ambassador's job is to drive results through communication tools either publicly, such as social media, or privately including emails, messaging and further one-to-one channels.

== History ==
=== Rise of brand managers ===
The concepts of brands and brand marketing have evolved over decades. Traditionally, consumers were familiar with only a few products that were available in the market. Beginning from the 1870s a number of companies began pushing 'branded products,' which familiarized consumers with more brands. From 1915 through the 1920s, manufacturer brands were established and developed further, which increased companies' reliance on brand advertising and marketing. However, the Great Depression led to a severe drawback in brand progress, as companies were left with few ways to increase revenue and get their business back on track. For the sake of their brand and survival in a hopeless market, companies such as Procter and Gamble, General Foods and Unilever developed the discipline of brand management. The "brand manager system" refers to the type of organizational structure in which brands or products are assigned to managers who are responsible for their performance.

=== Era of change ===
From the early- to mid-1950s to the mid-1960s, more firms moved toward adopting brand managers. The sudden boom in the economy, followed by a growing middle class population and birth rate, increased the demand for products within the market. This led to a steady competition among a number of manufacturers who found it hard to get their products noticed amidst the pre-existing brands. By the year 1967, 84% of large consumer packaged goods manufacturers had brand managers. Brand managers were also being referred to as "product managers" whose sole priority shifted from simply brand building to boosting up the company's sales and profit margin. "The product manager is man of the hour in marketing organizations.... Modern marketing needs the product manager," raved one 1960s article.

Over the course of several years, brand managers continued to exist as a medium that would help boost company revenue. In the 1990s, Marketing UK highlighted that brand managers are a part of an "outdated organizational system" while "the brand manager system has encouraged brand proliferation, which in turn has led to debilitating cannibalization and resource constraints."

=== Evolution of brand managers to brand ambassadors ===
From the 1990s to early 2000s, brand management itself evolved as brand asset management. Davis defined Brand Asset Management Strategy as "a balanced investment approach for building the meaning of the brand, communicating it internally and externally, and leveraging it to increase brand profitability, brand asset value, and brand returns over time."

=== College campus brand ambassadors ===
In the early 1990s marketing companies began to utilize campus ambassadors (also known as "brand representatives" and "brand ambassadors") college students who spread the word about the company that they represent. The goal of campus ambassadors is to help the company with marketing programs on campus to target the college demographic. This can be achieved by throwing events, hosting workshops, and utilizing social media to promote the brand or company. College campus brand ambassadors not only can market products or services through either events, workshops or social media. They can market through what others may say is more affective and better for the long run, which is marketing by word of mouth. Word-of-mouth marketing was the next-most-popular method of promotion – 75% of ambassadors said they used it, and 73% of them said it was a successful method of promotion. Just over 50% of the campus ambassadors we surveyed said that they hosted events for their company, but only 55% of them said that this was a successful.

== Contemporary terms ==
=== Celebrity branding ===
Using celebrities as brand ambassadors is not a new concept. Creswell highlights that, "film stars in the 1940s posed for cigarette companies, and Bob Hope pitched American Express in the late 1950s. Joe Namath slipped into Hanes pantyhose in the 1970s, and Bill Cosby jiggled for Jell-O for three decades. Sports icons like Michael Jordan and Tiger Woods elevated the practice, often scoring more in endorsement and licensing dollars than from their actual sports earnings."

Large corporations realized that the overall image of a brand ambassador within society is an integral element in attracting consumer attention. As a result, there was a substantial increase in the role of celebrities as brand ambassadors. It was assumed that integrating a celebrity to a brand would increase chances of it being sold, which made companies value the business ideal of a "brand ambassador". The case study of the famous watch brand Omega, illustrates that the brand faced a severe crash in sales in the 1970s due to the Japanese Quartz phenomenon. Michael believes that, "by the time Omega had seen the error of its ways, the damage to its reputation was done. From the 1970s to the end of the 1990s, it was no longer seen as a luxury watch company." It was then for the first time in 1995, that Cindy Crawford became the new face of Omega, introducing the age of the celebrity brand ambassador. The man behind this marketing ploy was believed to be Jean-Claude Biver, whose strategy changed the entire landscape for branding. During this time, many companies expanded their annual budgets to meet the financial liabilities that came with celebrity endorsements.

Celebrities are popular and followed by many people so it makes sense that marketers benefit from using them in order to get their message across. A celebrity can capture consumers' attention, link the brand with their own personal image, and associate their positive attributes with those of the product concerned. However, in some cases celebrity branding could go wrong and affect product revenue. For example, doping charges against Lance Armstrong cost him $30 million in endorsements and he stepped down as the chairman of Livestrong. Nike – who sponsored Armstrong and the U.S. cycling team – stated in a press release," due to the seemingly insurmountable evidence that Lance Armstrong participated in doping and misled Nike for more than a decade, it is with great sadness that we have terminated our contract with him."

=== Self-branding ===
According to Giriharidas, "the personal-branding field or self-brand traces its origins to the 1997 essay "The Brand Called You," by the management expert Tom Peters." Contemporary theories of branding suggest that brand ambassadors do not need to have a formal relationship with a company in order to promote its products/services. In particular the Web 2.0 allows all individuals to choose a brand and come up with their own strategies to represent it. Biro believes that "everyone owns their own personal brand. Companies and leadership must see the value of this concept for a successful social workplace recipe. If a brand ambassador chooses to represent the company and/or its brands, the individual should do so in a transparent way." Self-branding is an effective way to help new businesses save the hassle of hiring brand ambassadors, training them and then realizing they are not good enough for the company. In addition, it is an effective tool in order to target a niche audience and allows one to take sole control of their own brand representation. On the other hand, branding one's own product/service creates an instant connection with the audience and helps the brand stand out in comparison to other known brands that use popular celebrities or hire brand ambassadors. Reis propagates her branding mantra, "think about other people. Think about the impressions you are making on friends, neighbors, business associates. Think about your brand." Creating a personal branding strategy is an effective way to attract audience attention. She gives the example of Marissa Mayer, CEO Yahoo. According to Laura Ries, Marissa is successful because she has what most people don't – "she has a brand."

Self-branding or personal branding is a way in which an individual may promote or build their reputation. Wheeler also highlights how sending an email can contribute towards an individual's personal brand and how personal branding has become important over the past few years due to the increase of self-employed individuals. The importance of personal branding increasingly rises due to modern audiences often trusting people as opposed to corporations. This falls down to the fact that audience members tend to believe that corporate organizations only have the final sales of product in mind as opposed to the publics interest instead. Furthermore, a personal brand is also a clear indication of who someone is and what best features they can offer, showing employees or clients what they could expect. The promotion of a personal brand is also a key part of creating and building a successful network of contacts, which in itself can lead to more business and future clients.

== Professional figures ==
=== Goodwill ambassador ===
Goodwill Ambassador is a post-nominal title of authority bestowed by a head of state or the secretariat of an INGO; it is also a job description and position of an individual linked to the promotion of non-profit causes. The primary function of a goodwill ambassador is to help organizations advocate their mission. Predominantly, goodwill ambassadors are celebrity activists or known personalities, who use their fame and talents to secure funding, solicit donations, encourage volunteers to participate and raise awareness of the organization's cause. Celebrities or known personalities are picked according to the organizations' intended audience and if fully invested in the cause they are promoting can greatly influence the process of persuading others and attracting attention towards a world issue. Goodwill ambassadors make widely publicized visits to the world's most troubled regions, and make appeals on behalf of their people and the organization. Celebrity Ambassador's are instrumental in 'marketing' the value of the UN's missions due in large part to their familiarity and likability. The United Nations goodwill ambassadors include famous celebrities like Angelina Jolie for UNHCR, David Beckham and Shakira for UNICEF, Christina Aguilera for WFP and Nicole Kidman for UN Women.

=== Promotional model ===
A promotional model is a type of a spokesmodel, trade show model and convention model. These models carry out functions beyond representation of the company in a positive light. The main difference between a brand ambassador and a promotional model is in the way they represent the product/service. In many cases, unlike brand ambassadors, a promotional model may give the audience an experience that reflects the product or service being branded. Promotional models are required to be present at the venue as per the requirements of the marketing campaign, however brand ambassadors are most often referred to as the 'face of the brand'. Promotional models are most often found in trade shows exhibits (in some cases referred to as "booth babes"), conventions and in print, digital or selected advertisements for the brand. The use of so-called "booth babe" models at trade show exhibits and conventions has been criticized by some.

=== Testimonial ===
Testimonial is simply a way of conveying assurance, in this case assurance is provided by the testimonial of the company or product/service in question in a written or spoken manner. A testimonial does not advertise the product freely unlike the role of the brand ambassador. A brand ambassador performs the function of a testimonial but a testimonial is not a brand ambassador. By simply providing a testimonial for a product/service, one need not be an ambassador for the same. For example, a customer can be a testimonial, since a testimony could be formal or informal "word of mouth" advocating the positive facets of the product. On the other hand, a consumer could not always be brand ambassador, since the latter is more commercial and is often considered as a position bound by monetary and professional liabilities. To a certain degree, celebrity endorsements provide testimonials for the product/service they are marketing. However, with the advent of the digital age testimonials have reached an all-time high. A large number of websites feature a "go to" tab where one can put down reviews or testimonials for the product/service. This has led to an increase in fake reviews, where companies have chosen to pay people to get their positive feedback. According to a study conducted by the research firm Gartner, "one in seven reviews/testimonials posted online by the end of next year is likely to be false. Other estimates put the number as high as one in three." However, on the flip side, the power of a customer's story has been proven to increase web traffic and conversions. But in this case, you would have customers who are building genuine relationships and showing that they're so passionate about your brand that it actually is part of their identity. If you're open to the possibilities, it isn't difficult to find activities that the company is comfortable with and customers are excited to be a part of. Shofar's Furniture implemented a brand ambassador program and had phenomenal results that increased their site traffic 4000%. And this doesn't mean that the company doesn't have access or also utilize these channels; it's a partnership of voices to leverage influence and networks from customers too.

=== Brand advocate ===
Fuggetta highlights that a brand advocate is a marketing term for "highly satisfied customers and others who go out of their way to actively promote the products they love and care about, they are a different breed altogether. " Further, he states that they are 50% more influential than an average customer. Often a positive experience with a brand, successful customer-service relationship motivates a brand advocate to express their positive feelings towards a brand. Brand advocates are also sometimes referred to as brand evangelists, emphasising their enthusiasm and voluntary promotion of a brand. Traditionally, a brand advocate would sing praises of a brand and this would circulate through 'word of mouth' or other similar channels. However, in the digital age social media tools have allowed brand advocates to express themselves on forums such as Twitter, Facebook by 'tweeting' about a brand experience or 'liking' the brand itself. Rubin believes, "when customers seek you out via social media, they're looking for an opportunity to build an emotional connection. So give it to them."

== See also ==
- Celebrity branding
- Corporate propaganda
- Influencer marketing
- Market segment
- Shill
- Social media marketing
- Spokesperson
