= Bullying in teaching =

Type of bullying in an educational setting

School teachers can be instigators of bullying within a school environment, and the subject of bullying by others.

== Teachers bullying others ==
According to an article, a high percentage of teachers admit that they bully their students.

Students with learning disabilities may be especially at risk for teacher bullying.

== Others bullying teachers ==
Comprehensive research carried out in the UK found that teaching was one of the occupations at highest risk from bullying:

- 15.5% of teachers stating they were currently being bullied by students.
- 35.4% saying they had been bullied over the last five years.

In another survey, the Economic and Social Research Institute found bullying to be more prevalent in schools (13.8%) than other workplaces (7.9%).

A common manifestation of teacher bullying is staffroom bullying where teachers are bullied by other teachers or school managers.

== Complex dynamics ==
There are complex issues with reporting bullying by teachers, not only for children, but also parents. By means of their position of power over the child, power that enables them to impact the child's present and future, children and parents are reluctant to report. There are specific signs that parents should watch for as their child is unlikely to disclose that the teacher is in fact the bully.

Furthermore, a teacher who bullies may present as a Jekyll and Hyde figure: they are often celebrated and popular so their abuse can go on for long periods of time undetected. Research on teachers in classrooms is lacking and it is unclear how much these activities go undetected or rewarded by teachers in the classroom. For coaches teaching a sport, it can be seen that adults are often rewarded for bullying conduct that would never be tolerated or condoned if done by a child.

Parsons identifies teacher bullying as often being part of a wider bullying culture within a school, with a complex web of dynamics such as:

- Teachers may be bullied by: other teachers, students, office staff, principals, school governors or parents
- Teachers may bully: other teachers, students or parents
- Teachers that bully others, may be subject to bullying, in return, from those they target

== Manifestations ==
In investigating teacher bullying, it is important to differentiate a teacher or coach who is demanding versus one who is demeaning. So "yelling" for instance can be highly productive and motivating, but if it involves belittling and is laced with putdowns, personal attacks, and insults, it becomes abusive. Bullying by teachers can take many forms in order to harass and intimidate including:

- Swearing, or yelling, especially in close proximity to the child
- Using homophobic, sexist, racial slurs, or direct personal attacks, comments targeting a child's disability or difference
- Humiliating
- Berating
- Ignoring or shunning
- Throwing objects
- Raging
- Expressing disgust at the child through gestures or facial expressions
- Muttering obscenities so only the targeted child or children hear
- Hypocrisy (ex: telling a student not to say "well" despite using the same word while communicating)
- Physical assault

Bullying of teachers can take many forms in order to harass and intimidate including:

- Face-to-face confrontation
- Memos
- Cyberbullying (including the use of text messaging or social networking sites)

Bullies often exploit positions of seniority over the colleagues they are intimidating (see rankism) by:

- Criticising their work
- Making unreasonable demands on workload (see setting up to fail)
- Sarcasm and jokes aimed at the victim
- Undermining them by over-ruling their decisions and views

In some cases, teachers are ignored and isolated by colleagues in the staffroom or turned down for promotion or training courses (see silent treatment). Other times, teachers are ostracized as whistleblowers when they report to administrators on students' reports of bullying being done by their colleagues.

== Impacts ==
The power imbalance of teacher to student is greater than peer to peer and may well intensify the impact. The possible impacts on a child of bullying by teachers include:

- Victimisation and victim blaming
- False accusations and fabricated formal disciplinary action
- Stress symptoms such as anxiety, headaches, nausea, palpitations, and hypertension
- Symptoms of post-traumatic stress disorder (PTSD) such as a compromised immune system, sleep problems, excessive guilt, irritability, hypervigilance (which feels like paranoia, but is not), constant anxiety, reactive depression and suicidal thoughts
- Loss of self-esteem
- Loss of job

"If bullying is performed by a person who is supposed to be a caregiver and a role model, it can be assumed that the consequences may be even more devastating for the exposed child"

== Notable incidents ==
In April 2012, Stuart Chaifetz, a father of an autistic boy, released a video on YouTube providing evidence that his son was allegedly the subject of emotional abuse at the hands of his teacher and aide at Horace Mann Elementary School, in the Cherry Hill Public Schools district. The evidence was secured when Chaifetz wired his son with a microphone before sending him to school. When he listened to the audio recording, according to one news report, "Chaifetz says he caught his son's teachers gossiping, talking about alcohol and violently yelling at students. He took the audio to the Cherry Hill School District, where officials fired one of the teachers involved after hearing the tape. Chaifetz's son was relocated to a new school, where Chaifetz says he is doing well." However, it appears that students with learning disabilities may be especially at risk for teacher bullying.

In June 2014, Britain proposed the "Cinderella Law" which would put emotional abuse in the Criminal Code.

== In popular culture ==
Teachers being portrayed as bullies have made into popular culture, along with works with teachers being bullied by other teachers, students, and even the principal.

=== Films ===
- Kids in America, a group of students with help from some teachers tries to stop their bully of a principal from becoming Superintendent, realizing the harm she can cause.
- The Nutty Professor, The School Bully bullies the Professor.
- Matilda, based on the novel of the same name, a student with psychokinesis helps her fellow students and a teacher to stop a cruel principal's reign of terror in the school.
- The Breakfast Club, Principal Vernon is often seen as a bully to the students serving detention.
- Mr. Woodcock, the film focuses on a man who is outraged that his former gym teacher, who bullied him and his classmates, is about to become his stepfather.
- A Little Princess, the main character is the target of a corrupt principal at a boarding school.
- The 400 Blows, Antoine Doinel is tormented by his insensitive teacher Guy Decomble.
- Whiplash, Andrew Neiman is bullied by his abusive teacher Terence Fletcher.

=== Books ===
- The Harry Potter series features bullying teachers, mainly Severus Snape and Dolores Umbridge.
- British girls' comics often featured bully teachers and principals in serials and regular strips. Examples can be found in Wee Sue, The Girls of Liberty Lodge and The Four Friends at Spartan School, (Tammy), and Hard Times for Helen (Judy). Patsy on the Warpath (June) reversed the trend to show a teacher being bullied by toughs in her class.

=== TV ===
- iCarly: there have been episodes, like "IHave My Principals", where Ms. Francine Briggs and Mr. Howard clearly bully students, including the main characters, one of whom, Sam, is a bully herself. Mr. Devlin and Lauren Ackerman also bullied the students.
- Ned's Declassified School Survival Guide, Mr. Sweeney, a science teacher, appears to be evil until the third season, where he appears to reform himself to the point of saving his students from Vice Principal Harvey Crubbs, who also bullies the students, mainly the main characters.
- Glee, Coach Bieste is bullied by staff, including Sue Sylvester and students.
- Home and Away, Casey Braxton is bullied by Mr Dave Townsend in Summer Bay High.
- The Simpsons episode, Black Eyed, Please, Lisa is bullied by a jealous substitute teacher, Miss Cantwell.
  - Later in episode Blazed and Confused, Bart is bullied by his cruel and sadistic new teacher, Mr. Jack Lassen, who shaves off the boy's hair in class.
- Grange Hill (season four, episode four) Christopher Stewart is bullied by P.E. teacher Mr. Hicks, to the point of physical injury.

=== Music ===
- "The Happiest Days of Our Lives" by Pink Floyd – song about abusive teachers who are themselves abused by their wives at home.

== See also ==
- Mobbing
- Personality disorders
- School bullying
- School violence
- Sexual harassment in education
- Sexual harassment and abuse of students by teachers
- Workplace bullying
