= Staffroom =

Office lounge for staff in educational settings

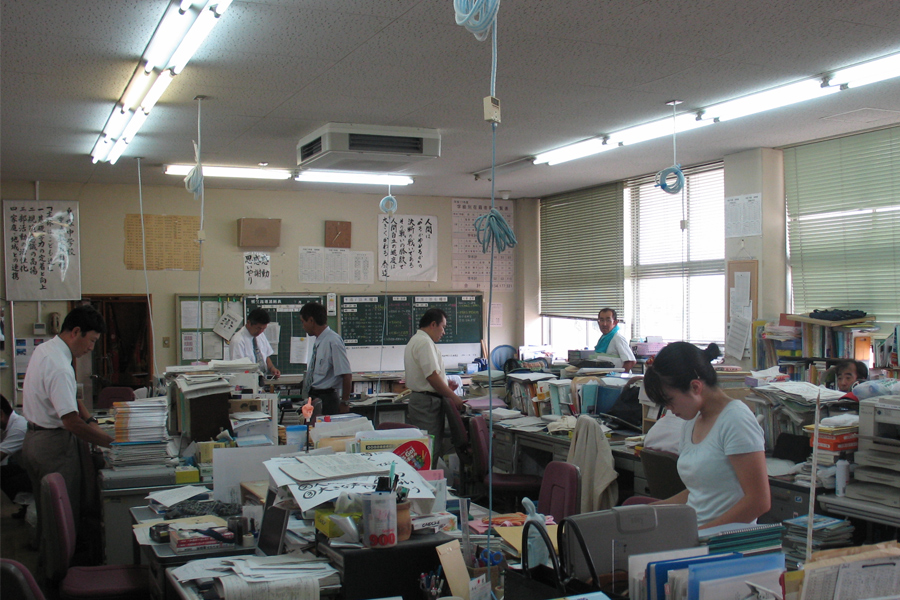
A teachers' lounge in Japan

A staffroom or teachers' lounge is a room in a school or college. It may refer to a communal work area where teachers have their desk and prepare lessons if they do not have a personal office, or may be a common room where teachers and/or school staff can relax, discuss work, eat, drink and socialise while not in class.

Since teaching can be very stressful, the staffroom can be a place to unwind between classes, reduce stress, and promote teacher well-being.

== See also ==
- Bullying in teaching
- Mailroom
- Staff room bullying
- Teacher burnout
- Workplace violence
