= Self-brand =

Process in which consumers match their self-concept with that of a specific brand image

Throughout the long history of consumer research, there has been much interest regarding how consumers choose which brand to buy and why they continue to purchase these brands. Self-branding describes the process in which consumers match their own self-concept with the images of a certain brand.

People engaged in consumption do not merely buy certain products to satisfy basic needs. In fact, consumer buying habits are at a much deeper level. Owning a certain brand can help consumers to express and build their own self-concept. Specifically, consumers will often only purchase certain trademarks when he/she finds a match between the brand image (communicated through advertisement, design of retail shop, or even package design) and his/her own self-concept. Thereby, the value of a brand also depends on its ability to help consumer to build and create self-concept.

== Formation of connections ==
=== Based on self-congruity theory ===
The above explanation for self-branding can be summarized by Sirgy's self-congruity theory. It is proposed that consumer behavior is partially determined by the similarity between consumers' psychological comparisons of the brand-user-image. This self-congruity affects consumption behavior of consumers through motives such as need for self-consistency (e.g. "I am a good student because I work hard to prepare for examinations and I always get good grades") and self-esteem. On the other hand, high self-congruity occurs when the consumers find appropriate match between their own self-image and the brand-image. Only high self-congruity would help consumers maintain and enhance self in a positive direction. Further from the above notions, high self-congruity will lead to positive attitudes towards the brand and repeated purchase.

=== Brand evaluation ===
Besides assisting consumer to choose which product and brand to buy, the matching process between self-concept and image of brand and product also determines how consumers evaluate the brand and product. When we say that a brand has a positive brand-image, it means that the brand has established some strong, favorable and unique associations with the consumer's self-image (e.g. iPods have a strong and explicit image of being trendy, fashionable and high-tech, a combination of brand image that is unique and valued by young people). These strong, favorable and unique associations can be mainly divided into two parts. They are image of users and the psychological benefits experienced by the users in buying this particular brand or product. Firstly, image of users means that when consumer evaluate the brand they will image the typical user of this particular brand and see whether they are similar to the typical user. Demographic and psychological profile of the typical user is usually a good source of information for consumer to make these comparisons. (e.g. if someone perceived themselves as a trendy youngster and valued advanced technology, the chance that they will buy an iPod for their own use is very high). Secondly, psychological benefits experienced by consumers include increase recognition by the peer group (i.e. social approval) and expression of how one would like other people to see and think of oneself (i.e. personal expression).

== Constructing a self-concept ==
When the set of brand associations are linked or connected to the self, these associations can help consumers achieve certain goals. These goals include what they might become, what they would like to become, and what they are afraid of becoming. People are motivated to create a favorable and consistent self-identity based on self-enhancement (i.e. people over-emphasize favorable evaluations and minimize critical assessment of themselves) self-verification (i.e. people want to be known and understood by others according to their firmly held beliefs and feelings about themselves respectively).

=== Self-enhancement ===
In self-enhancement, the impressions individuals hold about themselves are often biased towards a positive direction. Therefore, they over-emphasize favorable evaluations and minimize critical assessment of self. People use brand to represent favorable self-images to others or to themselves.

The first aspect in self-enhancement is the need to maintain and enhance self-esteem. Another aspect is about social interaction (e.g. staff meetings). In terms of impression management, people actively manage their presentation (e.g. the brand of garment) in front of other people so as to maximize the opportunity to gain positive feedback. On the other hand, people are also motivated to create a good impression (e.g. wearing a watch of big brand) in order to gain social approval and intrinsic satisfaction. This is especially true when the person has very high self-esteem.

=== Self-verification ===
Self-verification refers to seek accurate information about self. In general, people seek and interpret situations and behavioral strategies that match their present self-conceptions. In contrast, they avoid situations and behaviors that derive contradictory information.

Self-verification can be achieved by two primary strategies. The first strategy is seeing more self-confirmatory evidence than actually exists. The second strategy is striving to affect the reactions of other people by developing a self-confirmatory environment, which includes displaying identity cues such as driving a certain brand of automobile.

It is found that people choose products and brand by imagining the prototypical users for each item in the choice set and choosing the items that maximizes their similarity to a desired prototypical user.

=== Compatibility of self-enhancement and self-verification ===
It seems that it is incompatible to seek feedback that is favorable (self-enhancement) and at the same time seek accurate feedback regardless of favorability (self-verification). Social psychology shows that there are factors affecting the relative degree to which each feedback satisfied, e.g. cognitive resources, stable versus malleable aspects of personality, intuitive-experiential versus analytical-rational modes of thought, or cognitive versus affective processes. More specifically, it is found that people with high self-esteem, high self-monitors (i.e. regulate their own behavior in order to "look good"), narcissists (i.e. self-love), and Type B personalities (i.e. patient, relaxed, and easy-going) are more likely than their counterparts to be influenced by self-enhancement motives as opposed to self-verification motives.

== Use of YouTube to promote a brand ==
YouTube has become an increasingly popular platform for self-branding. As self-branding is known for its strategic placement of oneself through a media outlet, it is a commonplace for many individuals to post videos, clips, tutorials, and other visual aides under their channels. YouTube especially gives the individual the opportunity to upload and control the information that is distributed on themselves – as they are the ones creating, editing, and uploading the content. By controlling the information being displayed on their channels, it is possible to promote and market themselves on a wider scale as YouTube has millions cross paths with their site daily. Through self-branding, developing one's self is not the only aspect of this self-marketing tactic. There is also the aspect of "authenticity" to validate their specialties, and also a "business-targeted self presentation". This can be done through addressing the proper credentials or years of practice that has past throughout their practice of the topic or talent they relate themselves to.

The concept of self-branding a product can be seen particularly in the case of physical exercise gurus, beauty gurus, health gurus, food expert, and other gurus as well. This concept can be seen in the successful Michelle Phan, who is a beauty guru on YouTube. Michelle Phan has a record of revealing intimate facts about her life through interviews, blogs, and YouTube videos. On her website michellephan.com, she has created an "about me" section to further her self-branding in efforts to give a brief introduction about herself and her passion for beauty related topics, tips, and advice. She states, "I'm passionate about being a makeup artist and teaching others how to look and feel fabulous in their own skin". She also claims to help women raise their self-esteem and confidence levels. This is all done through "a safe space where makeup enthusiasts, fashion lovers, trendsetters, and beauty aficionados alike, can find inspiration, how-to advice, style news, easy DIY ideas, and tips".

YouTube gurus like Michelle Phan carry an image and a created identity. In an interview with fashionista.com, Michelle Phan stated that success in the blogging and video industry has to do with sending a message, vision, and brand identity. She has said to be cautious of what she is affiliated with, as it can affect the relationship she has formed with her followers. Through presenting an identity through her YouTube channel, she and other YouTube gurus alike have launched their own products. For instance, Michelle Phan has created a line of cosmetics that include eye shadows, lipsticks, eyeliners, foundation, contour sticks, concealer, and other forms of makeup that are related to the content she chooses to upload on her personal YouTube channel. Michelle Phan's ability to self-brand through media such as YouTube gives her a competitive advantage. YouTube reports that "more than 1 billion unique users visit YouTube each month". It also states "over 6 billion hours of video are watched each month on YouTube". Michelle Phan's channel is one of the channels YouTube claims is among the "thousands of channels that are making six figures a year".

== Development of concepts ==
In the process of consumer socialization, self-brand connections develop throughout childhood as a result of developmental changes. Major changes occur in the representation of self-concepts between early childhood and adolescence. As children grow older, they conceptualize the self in less concrete and more abstract terms. For example, a concrete thinker can recognize that John likes clothes; more abstract thinker can reflect on emotions, like affection. Self-concepts become more complex as children mature, with a greater variety of self-constructs used to describe the self. In the Dixon and Street (1975) study, possessions were not part of self-concept descriptions for 6- to 8-year-olds but surfaced and increased in importance from 8 to 16 years of age.

Children recognize brand at an early age, as young as 3 or 4 years of age. John and Sujan (1990) found that children 4–7 years of age used perceptual cues (shape, package color), whereas older children (8–10 years) used no observable conceptual cues (taste) as a basis for classifying products. They, in middle childhood (7–8 years of age) can name multiple brand products and request products by brand name. Their comparisons of the self-concept with brand take place on a concrete level that self-brand connections are straightforward in nature. For example, self-brand connections might be made on the basis of simply being familiar with or owning a brand.

Late childhood (10–12 years of age) begin heightened appreciation for subtle meanings imbedded in brand images converges with a trend toward defining the self in more abstract and complex terms. Brands gain recognition as useful devices for characterizing the self in terms of personality traits, user characteristics, and reference groups.

As children move into adolescence, children have deeper self-brand connections because they think about brand in a very specific way—as having personalities and symbolizing group membership—that provides a natural link to their self-concepts. A greater understanding of the self, combined with social pressures to "fit in" and signal group membership, leads adolescents to be more vigilant about the social implications of owning certain brand. As a result, adolescents possess an even larger number of self-brand connections, which may be even more complex in nature.

== Reference group ==
As mentioned in the social comparison theory proposed by social psychologist Leon Festinger in 1954, humans have a drive to evaluate themselves by examining their opinions and abilities in comparison to others. Consumers often use the images of other brands' users as a source of information for evaluating their own beliefs and perceptions about their own and others' social identities. They also actively construct self-concept using brand associations that arise through reference group.

In many consumer researches, reference group is a key concept for demonstrating the congruency between group membership and brand usage. It refers to the social groups that are important to a consumer and against which he/she compares oneself. With different personal goals, individuals would take different types of reference groups. For example, if someone would like to verify his own current social identities, he tends to compare himself with a 'member group', to which it supposes he belongs to. For example, if a person considers himself to be intellectual and his member group of intellectuals tends to drive a Volvos, he may choose to drive Volvo too. Similarly, an 'aspiration group' is another type of reference group to which an individual aspires to belong. If a consumer wishes to be more hip, and he sees hip people wearing Versace clothing, he may choose to wear Versace clothing in an attempt to appropriate the hip associations of that brand.

== Use ==
On the marketing level, companies gain an enduring competitive advantage by utilizing the association between brand and self-concept. This type of association is difficult for competitors to imitate. For example, in a sport consumption context, when consumer fans identify with the team (i.e., a branded organization) and rally together in expectation of victory, the team image is emphasized.

On the individual level, brand symbolism provides moderation effects for in-group and out-group association. For in-groups, a symbolic brand has a stronger communicating effect than a non-symbolic brand; for out-groups, only a symbolic brand used to differentiate one from out-group.
