= List of Grange Hill episodes =

Grange Hill is a British drama television series that focuses on the lives of the pupils at the fictional North London comprehensive school, Grange Hill, in the fictitious London borough of Northam; from series 26, the school ceased to have a specific location. Six hundred and one episodes aired across 31 series.

== Series overview ==
Series	Episodes	Originally released	
Series	Episodes	First released	Last released
1	9	8 February 1978	5 April 1978
2	18	2 January 1979	2 March 1979
3	16	8 January 1980	29 February 1980
4	19	30 December 1980	28 December 1981
5	18	5 January 1982	5 March 1982
6	18	4 January 1983	4 March 1983
7	18	3 January 1984	2 March 1984
8	19	18 February 1985	27 December 1985
9	24	7 January 1986	1 April 1986
10	24	6 January 1987	27 March 1987
11	20	5 January 1988	11 March 1988
12	20	3 January 1989	10 March 1989
13	20	2 January 1990	9 March 1990
14	20	8 January 1991	15 March 1991
15	20	7 January 1992	13 March 1992
16	20	5 January 1993	12 March 1993
17	20	4 January 1994	11 March 1994
18	20	3 January 1995	20 March 1995
19	20	23 January 1996	28 March 1996
20	20	21 January 1997	27 March 1997
21	20	27 January 1998	2 April 1998
22	20	26 January 1999	1 April 1999
23	20	25 January 2000	30 March 2000
24	20	23 January 2001	29 March 2001
25	18	29 January 2002	28 March 2002
26	20	28 January 2003	3 April 2003
27	20	6 January 2004	11 March 2004
28	20	10 January 2005	23 March 2005
29	20	7 November 2005	2 December 2005
30	20	16 January 2007	22 March 2007
31	20	14 April 2008	15 September 2008

== Series 1 (1978) ==
No.	Episode	Writer	Director	Original airdate	UK viewers (millions)
1	Episode One	Phil Redmond	Colin Cant	8 February 1978	TBC
2	Episode Two	Phil Redmond	Colin Cant	15 February 1978	TBC
3	Episode Three	Phil Redmond	Colin Cant	22 February 1978	TBC
4	Episode Four	Phil Redmond	Colin Cant	1 March 1978	TBC
5	Episode Five	Phil Redmond	Colin Cant	8 March 1978	TBC
6	Episode Six	Phil Redmond	Colin Cant	15 March 1978	TBC
7	Episode Seven	Phil Redmond	Colin Cant	22 March 1978	TBC
8	Episode Eight	Phil Redmond	Colin Cant	29 March 1978	TBC
9	Episode Nine	Phil Redmond	Colin Cant	5 April 1978	TBC

== Series 2 (1979) ==
No.	Episode	Writer	Director	Original airdate	UK viewers (millions)
10	Episode One	Phil Redmond	Colin Cant	2 January 1979	TBC
11	Episode Two	Phil Redmond	Colin Cant	5 January 1979	TBC
12	Episode Three	Phil Redmond & Alan Janes	Colin Cant	9 January 1979	TBC
13	Episode Four	Phil Redmond & Margaret Simpson	Colin Cant	12 January 1979	TBC
14	Episode Five	Phil Redmond & Margaret Simpson	Colin Cant	16 January 1979	TBC
15	Episode Six	Phil Redmond	Roger Singleton-Turner	19 January 1979	TBC
16	Episode Seven	Phil Redmond	Roger Singleton-Turner	23 January 1979	TBC
17	Episode Eight	Phil Redmond & Alan Janes	Colin Cant	26 January 1979	TBC
18	Episode Nine	Phil Redmond & Margaret Simpson	Roger Singleton-Turner	30 January 1979	TBC
19	Episode Ten	Phil Redmond	Roger Singleton-Turner	2 February 1979	TBC
20	Episode Eleven	Phil Redmond	Colin Cant	6 February 1979	TBC
21	Episode Twelve	Phil Redmond	Roger Singleton-Turner	9 February 1979	TBC
22	Episode Thirteen	Phil Redmond & Margaret Simpson	Colin Cant	13 February 1979	TBC
23	Episode Fourteen	Phil Redmond	Roger Singleton-Turner	16 February 1979	TBC
24	Episode Fifteen	Phil Redmond & Alan Janes	Colin Cant	20 February 1979	TBC
25	Episode Sixteen	Phil Redmond & Alan Janes	Colin Cant	23 February 1979	TBC
26	Episode Seventeen	Phil Redmond & Margaret Simpson	Colin Cant	27 February 1979	TBC
27	Episode Eighteen	Phil Redmond	Roger Singleton-Turner	2 March 1979	TBC

== Series 3 (1980) ==
No.	Episode	Writer	Director	Original airdate	UK viewers (millions)
28	Episode One	Phil Redmond	Brian Lennane	8 January 1980	TBC
29	Episode Two	Phil Redmond	Brian Lennane	11 January 1980	TBC
30	Episode Three	Phil Redmond	Jackie Willows	15 January 1980	TBC
31	Episode Four	Phil Redmond & Margaret Simpson	Jackie Willows	18 January 1980	TBC
32	Episode Five	Phil Redmond & Margaret Simpson	Brian Lennane	22 January 1980	TBC
33	Episode Six	Phil Redmond	Brian Lennane	25 January 1980	TBC
34	Episode Seven	Phil Redmond & Margaret Simpson	Jackie Willows	29 January 1980	TBC
35	Episode Eight	Phil Redmond	Jackie Willows	1 February 1980	TBC
36	Episode Nine	Phil Redmond	Brian Lennane	5 February 1980	TBC
37	Episode Ten	Phil Redmond	Brian Lennane	8 February 1980	TBC
38	Episode Eleven	Phil Redmond	Brian Lennane	12 February 1980	TBC
39	Episode Twelve	Phil Redmond & Alan Janes	Brian Lennane	15 February 1980	TBC
40	Episode Thirteen	Phil Redmond	Brian Lennane	19 February 1980	TBC
41	Episode Fourteen	Phil Redmond & Alan Janes	Jackie Willows	22 February 1980	TBC
42	Episode Fifteen	Phil Redmond & Alan Janes	Roger Singleton-Turner	26 February 1980	TBC
43	Episode Sixteen	Phil Redmond	Roger Singleton-Turner	29 February 1980	TBC

== Series 4 (1980–1981) ==
No.	Episode	Writer	Director	Original airdate	UK viewers (millions)
44	Episode One	Phil Redmond	Colin Cant	30 December 1980	TBC
45	Episode Two	Phil Redmond	Colin Cant	2 January 1981	TBC
46	Episode Three	Phil Redmond & Sandy Welch	Christine Secombe	6 January 1981	TBC
47	Episode Four	Phil Redmond	Colin Cant	9 January 1981	TBC
48	Episode Five	Phil Redmond & Sandy Welch	Christine Secombe	13 January 1981	TBC
49	Episode Six	Phil Redmond	Sarah Hellings	16 January 1981	TBC
50	Episode Seven	Phil Redmond & Alan Janes	Christine Secombe	20 January 1981	TBC
51	Episode Eight	Phil Redmond & Alan Janes	Christine Secombe	23 January 1981	TBC
52	Episode Nine	Phil Redmond & Margaret Simpson	Christine Secombe	27 January 1981	TBC
53	Episode Ten	Phil Redmond & Margaret Simpson	Christine Secombe	30 January 1981	TBC
54	Episode Eleven	Alan Janes	Christine Secombe	3 February 1981	TBC
55	Episode Twelve	Phil Redmond & Alan Janes	Colin Cant	6 February 1981	TBC
56	Episode Thirteen	Phil Redmond	Colin Cant	10 February 1981	TBC
57	Episode Fourteen	Alan Janes	Colin Cant	13 February 1981	TBC
58	Episode Fifteen	Alan Janes	Graham Theakston	17 February 1981	TBC
59	Episode Sixteen	Phil Redmond	Colin Cant	20 February 1981	TBC
60	Episode Seventeen	Jane Hollowood & Alan Janes	Graham Theakston	24 February 1981	TBC
61	Episode Eighteen	Phil Redmond	Christine Secombe	27 February 1981	TBC
62	Christmas Special	Phil Redmond & Paul Manning	Hugh David	28 December 1981	TBC

== Series 5 (1982) ==
No.	Episode	Writer	Director	Original airdate	UK viewers (millions)
63	Arrival	Alan Janes	Diarmuid Lawrence	5 January 1982	TBC
64	Settling In	Alan Jane	Anthea Browne-Wilkinson	8 January 1982	TBC
65	Sex Education	Jane Hollowood	Anthea Browne-Wilkinson	12 January 1982	TBC
66	Text Books	Margaret Simpson	Anthea Browne-Wilkinson	15 January 1982	TBC
67	Instruments	Margaret Simpson	Anthea Browne-Wilkinson	19 January 1982	TBC
68	Sports Trials	Margaret Simpson	Christine Secombe	22 January 1982	TBC
69	Saturday Job	Barry Purchese	John Prowse	26 January 1982	TBC
70	Scruffy McDuffy	Barry Purchese	John Prowse	29 January 1982	TBC
71	Stickers	Barry Purchese	John Prowse	2 February 1982	TBC
72	Exploration	Barry Purchese	John Browse	5 February 1982	TBC
73	Sponsorship	Jane Hollowood	John Prowse	9 February 1982	TBC
74	Zoo	Jane Hollowood	Diarmuid Lawrence	12 February 1982	TBC
75	Girl Gangs	Margaret Simpson	Anthea Browne-Wilkinson	16 February 1982	TBC
76	Diary	Margaret Simpson	Anthea Browne-Wilkinson	19 February 1982	TBC
77	Despair	Alan Janes	John Prowse	23 February 1982	TBC
78	School Revue	Barry Purchese	Diarmuid Lawrence	26 February 1982	TBC
79	Aftermath	Alan Janes	Anthea Browne-Wilkinson	2 March 1982	TBC
80	Exams	Alan Janes	Anthea Browne-Wilkinson	5 March 1982	TBC

== Series 6 (1983) ==
No.	Episode	Writer	Director	Original airdate	UK viewers (millions)
81	Return	Barry Purchese	Carol Wilks	4 January 1983	TBC
82	New Faces	Barry Purchese	Carol Wilks	7 January 1983	TBC
83	Choices	Jane Hollowood	Edward Pugh	11 January 1983	TBC
84	Thuggies	Jane Hollowood	Alistair Clarke	14 January 1983	TBC
85	On Trial	Margaret Simpson	Carol Wilks	18 January 1983	TBC
86	Field Trip	Margaret Simpson	Kenny McBain	21 January 1983	TBC
87	Love Triangle	Margaret Simpson	Carol Wilks	25 January 1983	TBC
88	Weightwatchers	David Angus	Alistair Clarke	28 January 1983	TBC
89	Open Day	Paula Milne	Alistair Clarke	1 February 1983	TBC
90	An Inspector Calls	Margaret Simpson	Alistair Clarke	4 February 1983	TBC
91	Paper Chase	David Angus	Carol Wilks	8 February 1983	TBC
92	Publication	Margaret Simpson	Carol Wilks	11 February 1983	TBC
93	Backlash	Barry Purchese	Alistair Clarke	15 February 1983	TBC
94	Repercussions	Barry Purchese	Alistair Clarke	18 February 1983	TBC
95	Outward Bound – Part 1	Jane Hollowood	TBA	22 February 1983	TBC
96	Outward Bound – Part 2	Jane Hollowood	TBA	25 February 1983	TBC
97	Sympathy	Barry Purchese	Edward Pugh	1 March 1983	TBC
98	Rally	Barry Purchese	TBA	4 March 1983	TBC

== Series 7 (1984) ==
No.	Episode	Writer(s)	Director	Original airdate	UK viewers (millions)
99	Episode One	Phil Redmond and Barry Purchese	Carol Wilks	3 January 1984	TBC
100	Episode Two	Phil Redmond and Margaret Simpson	Carol Wilks	6 January 1984	TBC
101	Episode Three	Phil Redmond and David Angus	Nic Phillips	10 January 1984	TBC
102	Episode Four	Phil Redmond and David Angus	Nic Phillips	13 January 1984	TBC
103	Episode Five	Phil Redmond and David Angus	Nic Phillips	17 January 1984	TBC
104	Episode Six	Phil Redmond and Barry Purchese	Carol Wilks	20 January 1984	TBC
105	Episode Seven	Phil Redmond and Frances Galleymore	David Bell	24 January 1984	TBC
106	Episode Eight	Phil Redmond and Margaret Simpson	TBA	27 January 1984	TBC
107	Episode Nine	Phil Redmond and Margaret Simpson	TBA	31 January 1984	TBC
108	Episode Ten	Phil Redmond and Barry Purchese	Edward Pugh	3 February 1984	TBC
109	Episode Eleven	Phil Redmond and Jane Hollowood	TBA	7 February 1984	TBC
110	Episode Twelve	Phil Redmond and Barry Purchese	Nic Phillips	10 February 1984	TBC
111	Episode Thirteen	Phil Redmond and Barry Purchese	Nic Phillips	14 February 1984	TBC
112	Episode Fourteen	Phil Redmond and Frances Galleymore	Edward Pugh	17 February 1984	TBC
113	Episode Fifteen	Phil Redmond and Barry Purchese	Nic Phillips	21 February 1984	TBC
114	Episode Sixteen	Phil Redmond and Barry Purchese	Nic Phillips	24 February 1984	TBC
115	Episode Seventeen	Phil Redmond and Jane Hollowood	TBA	28 February 1984	TBC
116	Episode Eighteen	Phil Redmond and Barry Purchese	Edward Pugh	2 March 1984	TBC

== Series 8 (1985) ==
No.	Episode	Writer(s)	Director	Original airdate	UK viewers (millions)
117	Episode One	Barry Purchese and Anthony Minghella	Edward Pugh	18 February 1985	TBC
118	Episode Two	David Angus and Anthony Minghella	Edward Pugh	20 February 1985	TBC
119	Episode Three	David Angus and Anthony Minghella	Margie Barbour	25 February 1985	TBC
120	Episode Four	David Angus and Anthony Minghella	Roger Singleton-Turner	27 February 1985	TBC
121	Episode Five	Margaret Simpson and Anthony Minghella	Margie Barbour	4 March 1985	TBC
122	Episode Six	John Godber and Anthony Minghella	Roger Singleton-Turner	6 March 1985	TBC
123	Episode Seven	Margaret Simpson	Edward Pugh	11 March 1985	TBC
124	Episode Eight	Barry Purchese	Edward Pugh	13 March 1985	TBC
125	Episode Nine	Barry Purchese	Margie Barbour	18 March 1985	TBC
126	Episode Ten	Rosemary Mason	TBA	20 March 1985	TBC
127	Episode Eleven	Rosemary Mason	Roger Singleton-Turner	25 March 1985	TBC
128	Episode Twelve	Frances Galleymore	Roger Singleton-Turner	27 March 1985	TBC
129	Episode Thirteen	Frances Galleymore	John Smith	1 April 1985	TBC
130	Episode Fourteen	Anthony Minghella and Barry Purchese	John Smith	3 April 1985	TBC
131	Episode Fifteen	John Godber	David Bell	10 April 1985	TBC
132	Episode Sixteen	Margaret Simpson	John Godber	15 April 1985	TBC
133	Episode Seventeen	Margaret Simpson and Anthony Minghella	Roger Singleton-Turner	17 April 1985	TBC
134	Episode Eighteen	Barry Purchese	Roger Singleton-Turner	22 April 1985	TBC
135	Christmas Special	Phil Redmond	John Smith	27 December 1985	TBC

== Series 9 (1986) ==
No.	Episode	Writer	Director	Original airdate	UK viewers (millions)
136	Episode One	Barry Purchese	Edward Pugh	7 January 1986	TBC
137	Episode Two	Barry Purchese	Edward Pugh	10 January 1986	TBC
138	Episode Three	David Angus	Edward Pugh	14 January 1986	TBC
139	Episode Four	David Angus	Edward Pugh	17 January 1986	TBC
140	Episode Five	Margaret Simpson	Roger Singleton-Turner	21 January 1986	TBC
141	Episode Six	Margaret Simpson	Roger Singleton-Turner	24 January 1986	TBC
142	Episode Seven	Frances Galleymore	Roger Singleton-Turner	28 January 1986	TBC
143	Episode Eight	Frances Galleymore	Roger Singleton-Turner	31 January 1986	TBC
144	Episode Nine	Sarah Daniels	Margie Barbour	4 February 1986	TBC
145	Episode Ten	Sarah Daniels	Margie Barbour	7 February 1986	TBC
146	Episode Eleven	John Godber	David Bell	11 February 1986	TBC
147	Episode Twelve	Barry Purchese	David Bell	14 February 1986	TBC
148	Episode Thirteen	Margaret Simpson	David Bell	18 February 1986	TBC
149	Episode Fourteen	Margaret Simpson	David Bell	21 February 1986	TBC
150	Episode Fifteen	Rosemary Mason	John Smith	25 February 1986	TBC
151	Episode Sixteen	Rosemary Mason	John Smith	28 February 1986	TBC
152	Episode Seventeen	Margaret Simpson	John Smith	4 March 1986	TBC
153	Episode Eighteen	Margaret Simpson	Roger Singleton-Turner	7 March 1986	TBC
154	Episode Nineteen	Barry Purchese	Roger Singleton-Turner	11 March 1986	TBC
155	Episode Twenty	Barry Purchese	Margie Barbour	14 March 1986	TBC
156	Episode Twenty-One	Barry Purchese	Margie Barbour	18 March 1986	TBC
157	Episode Twenty-Two	Barry Purchese	Margie Barbour	21 March 1986	TBC
158	Episode Twenty-Three	David Angus	Margie Barbour	25 March 1986	TBC
159	Episode Twenty-Four	David Angus	Margie Barbour	1 April 1986	TBC

== Series 10 (1987) ==
No.	Episode	Writer	Director	Original airdate	UK viewers (millions)
160	Episode One	Barry Purchese	Edward Pugh	6 January 1987	TBC
161	Episode Two	Barry Purchese	Edward Pugh	9 January 1987	TBC
162	Episode Three	David Angus	Edward Pugh	13 January 1987	TBC
163	Episode Four	David Angus	Edward Pugh	16 January 1987	TBC
164	Episode Five	Margaret Simpson	Roger Singleton-Turner	20 January 1987	TBC
165	Episode Six	Margaret Simpson	Roger Singleton-Turner	23 January 1987	TBC
166	Episode Seven	Frances Galleymore	Roger Singleton-Turner	27 January 1987	TBC
167	Episode Eight	Frances Galleymore	Roger Singleton-Turner	30 January 1987	TBC
168	Episode Nine	Sarah Daniels	Margie Barbour	3 February 1987	TBC
169	Episode Ten	Sarah Daniels	Margie Barbour	6 February 1987	TBC
170	Episode Eleven	John Godber	David Bell	10 February 1987	TBC
171	Episode Twelve	Barry Purchese	David Bell	13 February 1987	TBC
172	Episode Thirteen	Margaret Simpson	David Bell	17 February 1987	TBC
173	Episode Fourteen	Margaret Simpson	David Bell	20 February 1987	TBC
174	Episode Fifteen	Rosemary Mason	John Smith	24 February 1987	TBC
175	Episode Sixteen	Rosemary Mason	John Smith	27 February 1987	TBC
176	Episode Seventeen	Margaret Simpson	John Smith	3 March 1987	TBC
177	Episode Eighteen	Margaret Simpson	Roger Singleton-Turner	6 March 1987	TBC
178	Episode Nineteen	Barry Purchese	Roger Singleton-Turner	10 March 1987	TBC
179	Episode Twenty	Barry Purchese	Margie Barbour	13 March 1987	TBC
180	Episode Twenty-One	Barry Purchese	Margie Barbour	17 March 1987	TBC
181	Episode Twenty-Two	Barry Purchese	Margie Barbour	20 March 1987	TBC
182	Episode Twenty-Three	David Angus	Margie Barbour	24 March 1987	TBC
183	Episode Twenty-Four	David Angus	Margie Barbour	27 March 1987	TBC

== Series 11 (1988) ==
No.	Episode	Writer	Director	Original airdate	UK viewers (millions)
184	Episode One	Chris Ellis	Albert Barber	5 January 1988	TBC
185	Episode Two	Chris Ellis	Albert Barber	8 January 1988	TBC
186	Episode Three	David Angus	Albert Barber	12 January 1988	TBC
187	Episode Four	David Angus	Albert Barber	15 January 1988	TBC
188	Episode Five	David Angus	John Smith	19 January 1988	TBC
189	Episode Six	David Angus	John Smith	22 January 1988	TBC
190	Episode Seven	Sarah Daniels	John Smith	26 January 1988	TBC
191	Episode Eight	Sarah Daniels	John Smith	29 January 1988	TBC
192	Episode Nine	Margaret Simpson	Robert Gabriel	2 February 1988	TBC
193	Episode Ten	Margaret Simpson	Robert Gabriel	5 February 1988	TBC
194	Episode Eleven	Margaret Simpson	Robert Gabriel	9 February 1988	TBC
195	Episode Twelve	David Angus	Albert Barber	12 February 1988	TBC
196	Episode Thirteen	Kay Trainer	Albert Barber	16 February 1988	TBC
197	Episode Fourteen	Barry Purchese	Albert Barber	19 February 1988	TBC
198	Episode Fifteen	Barry Purchese	Albert Barber	23 February 1988	TBC
199	Episode Sixteen	Barry Purchese	John Smith	26 February 1988	TBC
200	Episode Seventeen	Barry Purchese	John Smith	1 March 1988	TBC
201	Episode Eighteen	Barry Purchese	John Smith	4 March 1988	TBC
202	Episode Nineteen	Margaret Simpson	John Smith	8 March 1988	TBC
203	Episode Twenty	Margaret Simpson	Robert Gabriel	11 March 1988	TBC

== Series 12 (1989) ==
No.	Episode	Writer	Director	Original airdate	UK viewers (millions)
204	Episode One	Barry Purchese	Laurence Williams	3 January 1989	TBC
205	Episode Two	Barry Purchese	Albert Barber	6 January 1989	TBC
206	Episode Three	Barry Purchese	Albert Barber	10 January 1989	TBC
207	Episode Four	Margaret Simpson	Albert Barber	13 January 1989	TBC
208	Episode Five	Kay Trainor	John Smith	17 January 1989	TBC
209	Episode Six	Kay Trainor	John Smith	20 January 1989	TBC
210	Episode Seven	Chris Ellis	John Smith	24 January 1989	TBC
211	Episode Eight	Chris Ellis	John Smith	27 January 1989	TBC
212	Episode Nine	Margaret Simpson	Robert Gabriel	31 January 1989	TBC
213	Episode Ten	Margaret Simpson	Robert Gabriel	3 February 1989	TBC
214	Episode Eleven	David Angus	John Smith	7 February 1989	TBC
215	Episode Twelve	David Angus	John Smith	10 February 1989	TBC
216	Episode Thirteen	Margaret Simpson	Robert Gabriel	14 February 1989	TBC
217	Episode Fourteen	Margaret Simpson	Robert Gabriel	17 February 1989	TBC
218	Episode Fifteen	Barry Purchese	John Smith	21 February 1989	TBC
219	Episode Sixteen	Barry Purchese	John Smith	24 February 1989	TBC
220	Episode Seventeen	Sarah Daniels	Ronald Smedley	28 February 1989	TBC
221	Episode Eighteen	Sarah Daniels	Ronald Smedley	3 March 1989	TBC
222	Episode Nineteen	David Angus	Ronald Smedley	7 March 1989	TBC
223	Episode Twenty	David Angus	Ronald Smedley	10 March 1989	TBC

== Series 13 (1990) ==
No.	Episode	Writer	Director	Original airdate	UK viewers (millions)
224	Episode One	Barry Purchese	John Smith	2 January 1990	TBC
225	Episode Two	John Smith	John Smith	5 January 1990	TBC
226	Episode Three	Chris Ellis	John Smith	9 January 1990	TBC
227	Episode Four	Margaret Simpson	John Smith	12 January 1990	TBC
228	Episode Five	Margaret Simpson	Andrew Whitman	16 January 1990	TBC
229	Episode Six	Kay Trainor	Andrew Whitman	19 January 1990	TBC
230	Episode Seven	Kay Trainer	Andrew Whitman	23 January 1990	TBC
231	Episode Eight	David Angus	Andrew Whitman	26 January 1990	TBC
232	Episode Nine	Barry Purchese	Richard Kelly	30 January 1990	TBC
233	Episode Ten	Barry Purchese	Richard Kelly	2 February 1990	TBC
234	Episode Eleven	Margaret Simpson	Richard Kelly	6 February 1990	TBC
235	Episode Twelve	Margaret Simpson	Richard Kelly	9 February 1990	TBC
236	Episode Thirteen	Sarah Daniels	Riitta-Leena Lynn	13 February 1990	TBC
237	Episode Fourteen	Sarah Daniels	Riitta-Leena Lynn	16 February 1990	TBC
238	Episode Fifteen	Kevin Hood	Riitta-Leena Lynn	20 February 1990	TBC
239	Episode Sixteen	Kevin Hood	Riitta-Leena Lynn	23 February 1990	TBC
240	Episode Seventeen	Chris Ellis	Richard Kelly	27 February 1990	TBC
241	Episode Eighteen	Barry Purchese	Richard Kelly	2 March 1990	TBC
242	Episode Nineteen	David Angus	Richard Kelly	6 March 1990	TBC
243	Episode Twenty	David Angus	Richard Kelly	9 March 1990	TBC

== Series 14 (1991) ==
No.	Episode	Writer	Director	Original airdate	UK viewers (millions)
244	Episode One	Sarah Daniels	Riitta-Leena Lynn	8 January 1991	TBC
245	Episode Two	Kay Trainer	Riitta-Leena Lynn	11 January 1991	TBC
246	Episode Three	Kay Trainer	Riitta-Leena Lynn	15 January 1991	TBC
247	Episode Four	Barry Purchese	Riitta-Leena Lynn	18 January 1991	TBC
248	Episode Five	Barry Purchese	Richard Kelly	22 January 1991	TBC
249	Episode Six	Margaret Simpson	Richard Kelly	25 January 1991	TBC
250	Episode Seven	Kevin Hood	Richard Kelly	29 January 1991	TBC
251	Episode Eight	Chris Ellis	Richard Kelly	1 February 1991	TBC
252	Episode Nine	Margaret Simpson	Albert Barber	5 February 1991	TBC
253	Episode Ten	Margaret Simpson	Albert Barber	8 February 1991	TBC
254	Episode Eleven	Barry Purchese	Richard Kelly	12 February 1991	TBC
255	Episode Twelve	Chris Ellis	Albert Barber	15 February 1991	TBC
256	Episode Thirteen	Chris Ellis	Albert Barber	19 February 1991	TBC
257	Episode Fourteen	Sarah Daniels	Richard Kelly	22 February 1991	TBC
258	Episode Fifteen	Kevin Hood	Richard Kelly	26 February 1991	TBC
259	Episode Sixteen	David Angus	Richard Kelly	1 March 1991	TBC
260	Episode Seventeen	Kevin Hood	David Andrews	5 March 1991	TBC
261	Episode Eighteen	David Angus	David Andrews	8 March 1991	TBC
262	Episode Nineteen	David Angus	Albert Barber	12 March 1991	TBC
263	Episode Twenty	Sarah Daniels	David Andrews	15 March 1991	TBC

== Series 15 (1992) ==
No.	Episode	Writer	Director	Original airdate	UK viewers (millions)
264	Episode One	Chris Ellis	Richard Kelly	7 January 1992	TBC
265	Episode Two	Chris Ellis	Richard Kelly	10 January 1992	TBC
266	Episode Three	Chris Ellis	Richard Kelly	14 January 1992	TBC
267	Episode Four	Chris Ellis	Richard Kelly	17 January 1992	TBC
268	Episode Five	Sarah Daniels	Albert Barber	21 January 1992	TBC
269	Episode Six	Sarah Daniels	Albert Barber	24 January 1992	TBC
270	Episode Seven	Sarah Daniels	Albert Barber	28 January 1992	TBC
271	Episode Eight	Sarah Daniels	Albert Barber	31 January 1992	TBC
272	Episode Nine	Alison Fisher	Richard Kelly	4 February 1992	TBC
273	Episode Ten	Alison Fisher	Richard Kelly	7 February 1992	TBC
274	Episode Eleven	Chris Ellis	Richard Kelly	11 February 1992	TBC
275	Episode Twelve	Chris Ellis	Richard Kelly	14 February 1992	TBC
276	Episode Thirteen	Kevin Hood	Vivienne Cozens	18 February 1992	TBC
277	Episode Fourteen	Kevin Hood	Vivienne Cozens	21 February 1992	TBC
278	Episode Fifteen	Kevin Hood	Vivienne Cozens	25 February 1992	TBC
279	Episode Sixteen	Kevin Hood	Vivienne Cozens	28 February 1992	TBC
280	Episode Seventeen	Barry Purchese	Nigel Douglas	3 March 1992	TBC
281	Episode Eighteen	Barry Purchese	Nigel Douglas	6 March 1992	TBC
282	Episode Nineteen	Margaret Simpson	Nigel Douglas	10 March 1992	TBC
283	Episode Twenty	Margaret Simpson	Nigel Douglas	13 March 1992	TBC

== Series 16 (1993) ==
No.	Episode	Writer	Director	Original airdate	UK viewers (millions)
284	Episode One	Alison Fisher	Albert Barber	5 January 1993	TBC
285	Episode Two	Alison Fisher	Albert Barber	8 January 1993	TBC
286	Episode Three	Alison Fisher	Albert Barber	12 January 1993	TBC
287	Episode Four	Alison Fisher	Albert Barber	15 January 1993	TBC
288	Episode Five	Diane Whitley	Richard Kelly	19 January 1993	TBC
289	Episode Six	Diane Whitley	Richard Kelly	22 January 1993	TBC
290	Episode Seven	Chris Ellis	Richard Kelly	26 January 1993	TBC
291	Episode Eight	Chris Ellis	Richard Kelly	29 January 1993	TBC
292	Episode Nine	Chris Ellis	Albert Barber	2 February 1993	TBC
293	Episode Ten	Chris Ellis	Nigel Douglas	5 February 1993	TBC
294	Episode Eleven	David Angus	Nigel Douglas	9 February 1993	TBC
295	Episode Twelve	David Angus	Nigel Douglas	12 February 1993	TBC
296	Episode Thirteen	Kevin Hood	Nigel Douglas	16 February 1993	TBC
297	Episode Fourteen	Kevin Hood	Albert Barber	19 February 1993	TBC
298	Episode Fifteen	Kevin Hood	Albert Barber	23 February 1993	TBC
299	Episode Sixteen	Kevin Hood	Albert Barber	26 February 1993	TBC
300	Episode Seventeen	Sarah Daniels	Richard Kelly	2 March 1993	TBC
301	Episode Eighteen	Sarah Daniels	Richard Kelly	5 March 1993	TBC
302	Episode Nineteen	Sarah Daniels	Richard Kelly	9 March 1993	TBC
303	Episode Twenty	Sarah Daniels	Richard Kelly	12 March 1993	TBC

== Series 17 (1994) ==
No.	Episode	Writer	Director	Original airdate	UK viewers (millions)
304	Episode One	Sarah Daniels	Vivienne Cozens	4 January 1994	TBC
305	Episode Two	Sarah Daniels	Vivienne Cozens	7 January 1994	TBC
306	Episode Three	Sarah Daniels	Vivienne Cozens	11 January 1994	TBC
307	Episode Four	Sarah Daniels	Vivienne Cozens	14 January 1994	TBC
308	Episode Five	Ol Parker	Nigel Douglas	18 January 1994	TBC
309	Episode Six	Ol Parker	Nigel Douglas	21 January 1994	TBC
310	Episode Seven	Diane Whitley	Nigel Douglas	25 January 1994	TBC
311	Episode Eight	Diane Whitley	Nigel Douglas	28 January 1994	TBC
312	Episode Nine	Chris Ellis	Christine Secombe	1 February 1994	TBC
313	Episode Ten	Chris Ellis	Christine Secombe	4 February 1994	TBC
314	Episode Eleven	Chris Ellis	Christine Secombe	8 February 1994	TBC
315	Episode Twelve	Chris Ellis	Christine Secombe	11 February 1994	TBC
316	Episode Thirteen	Alison Fisher	Vivienne Cozens	15 February 1994	TBC
317	Episode Fourteen	Alison Fisher	Vivienne Cozens	18 February 1994	TBC
318	Episode Fifteen	Alison Fisher	Vivienne Cozens	22 February 1994	TBC
319	Episode Sixteen	Alison Fisher	Vivienne Cozens	25 February 1994	TBC
320	Episode Seventeen	Kevin Hood	Nigel Douglas	1 March 1994	TBC
321	Episode Eighteen	Kevin Hood	Nigel Douglas	4 March 1994	TBC
322	Episode Nineteen	Kevin Hood	Nigel Douglas	8 March 1994	TBC
323	Episode Twenty	Kevin Hood	Nigel Douglas	11 March 1994	TBC

== Series 18 (1995) ==
No.	Episode	Writer	Director	Original airdate	UK viewers (millions)
324	Episode One	Diane Whitley	Nigel Douglas	3 January 1995	TBC
325	Episode Two	Diane Whitley	Nigel Douglas	6 January 1995	TBC
326	Episode Three	Diane Whitley	Nigel Douglas	10 January 1995	TBC
327	Episode Four	Diane Whitley	Nigel Douglas	13 January 1995	TBC
328	Episode Five	Judith Johnson	David Bell	17 January 1995	TBC
329	Episode Six	Judith Johnson	David Bell	20 January 1995	TBC
330	Episode Seven	Chris Ellis	David Bell	24 January 1995	TBC
331	Episode Eight	Chris Ellis	David Bell	27 January 1995	TBC
332	Episode Nine	Ol Parker	Steven Andrew	31 January 1995	TBC
333	Episode Ten	Ol Parker	Steven Andrew	3 February 1995	TBC
334	Episode Eleven	Sarah Daniels	Steven Andrew	7 February 1995	TBC
335	Episode Twelve	Sarah Daniels	Steven Andrew	10 February 1995	TBC
336	Episode Thirteen	Kevin Hood	Nigel Douglas	14 February 1995	TBC
337	Episode Fourteen	Kevin Hood	Nigel Douglas	17 February 1995	TBC
338	Episode Fifteen	Kevin Hood	Nigel Douglas	21 February 1995	TBC
339	Episode Sixteen	Kevin Hood	Nigel Douglas	24 February 1995	TBC
340	Episode Seventeen	Alison Fisher	David Bell	28 February 1995	TBC
341	Episode Eighteen	Alison Fisher	David Bell	3 March 1995	TBC
342	Episode Nineteen	Alison Fisher	David Bell	7 March 1995	TBC
343	Episode Twenty	Alison Fisher	David Bell	10 March 1995	TBC

== Series 19 (1996) ==
No.	Episode	Writer	Director	Original airdate	UK viewers (millions)
344	Episode One	Chris Ellis	Steven Andrew	23 January 1996	TBC
345	Episode Two	Chris Ellis	Steven Andrew	25 January 1996	TBC
346	Episode Three	Ol Parker	Steven Andrew	30 January 1996	TBC
347	Episode Four	Ol Parker	Steven Andrew	1 February 1996	TBC
348	Episode Five	Alison Fisher	Karen Stowe	6 February 1996	TBC
349	Episode Six	Alison Fisher	Karen Stowe	8 February 1996	TBC
350	Episode Seven	Alison Fisher	Karen Stowe	13 February 1996	TBC
351	Episode Eight	Alison Fisher	Karen Stowe	15 February 1996	TBC
352	Episode Nine	Sarah Daniels	Adrian Bean	20 February 1996	TBC
353	Episode Ten	Sarah Daniels	Adrian Bean	22 February 1996	TBC
354	Episode Eleven	Kevin Hood	Adrian Bean	27 February 1996	TBC
355	Episode Twelve	Kevin Hood	Adrian Bean	29 February 1996	TBC
356	Episode Thirteen	Diane Whitley	Steven Andrew	5 March 1996	TBC
357	Episode Fourteen	Diane Whitley	Steven Andrew	7 March 1996	TBC
358	Episode Fifteen	Diane Whitley	Steven Andrew	12 March 1996	TBC
359	Episode Sixteen	Diane Whitley	Steven Andrew	14 March 1996	TBC
360	Episode Seventeen	Sarah Daniels	Philippa Langdale	19 March 1996	TBC
361	Episode Eighteen	Sarah Daniels	Philippa Langdale	21 March 1996	TBC
362	Episode Nineteen	Judith Johnson	Philippa Langdale	26 March 1996	TBC
363	Episode Twenty	Judith Johnson	Philippa Langdale	28 March 1996	TBC

== Series 20 (1997) ==
No.	Episode	Writer	Director	Original airdate	UK viewers (millions)
364	Episode One	Alison Fisher	Adrian Bean	21 January 1997	TBC
365	Episode Two	Alison Fisher	Adrian Bean	23 January 1997	TBC
366	Episode Three	Alison Fisher	Adrian Bean	28 January 1997	TBC
367	Episode Four	Alison Fisher	Adrian Bean	30 January 1997	TBC
368	Episode Five	Diane Whitley	Philippa Langdale	4 February 1997	TBC
369	Episode Six	Diane Whitley	Philippa Langdale	6 February 1997	TBC
370	Episode Seven	Diane Whitley	Philippa Langdale	11 February 1997	TBC
371	Episode Eight	Diane Whitley	Philippa Langdale	13 February 1997	TBC
372	Episode Nine	Sarah Daniels	David Bell	18 February 1997	TBC
373	Episode Ten	Sarah Daniels	David Bell	20 February 1997	TBC
374	Episode Eleven	Sarah Daniels	David Bell	25 February 1997	TBC
375	Episode Twelve	Sarah Daniels	David Bell	27 February 1997	TBC
376	Episode Thirteen	Leigh Jackson	Karen Stowe	4 March 1997	TBC
377	Episode Fourteen	Leigh Jackson	Karen Stowe	6 March 1997	TBC
378	Episode Fifteen	Chris Ellis	Karen Stowe	11 March 1997	TBC
379	Episode Sixteen	Chris Ellis	Karen Stowe	13 March 1997	TBC
380	Episode Seventeen	Chris Ellis	Philippa Langdale	18 March 1997	TBC
381	Episode Eighteen	Chris Ellis	Philippa Langdale	20 March 1997	TBC
382	Episode Nineteen	Tanika Gupta	Philippa Langdale	25 March 1997	TBC
383	Episode Twenty	Tanika Gupta	Philippa Langdale	27 March 1997	TBC

== Series 21 (1998) ==
No.	Episode	Writer	Director	Original airdate	UK viewers (millions)
384	Episode One	Chris Ellis	Philippa Langdale	27 January 1998	TBC
385	Episode Two	Chris Ellis	Philippa Langdale	29 January 1998	TBC
386	Episode Three	Diane Whitley	Philippa Langdale	3 February 1998	TBC
387	Episode Four	Diane Whitley	Philippa Langdale	5 February 1998	TBC
388	Episode Five	Leigh Jackson	Giancarlo Gemin	10 February 1998	TBC
389	Episode Six	Leigh Jackson	Giancarlo Gemin	12 February 1998	TBC
390	Episode Seven	Sarah Daniels	Giancarlo Gemin	17 February 1998	TBC
391	Episode Eight	Sarah Daniels	Giancarlo Gemin	19 February 1998	TBC
392	Episode Nine	Leigh Jackson	Terry Iland	24 February 1998	TBC
393	Episode Ten	Leigh Jackson	Terry Iland	26 February 1998	TBC
394	Episode Eleven	Diane Whitley	Terry Iland	3 March 1998	TBC
395	Episode Twelve	Diane Whitley	Terry Iland	5 March 1998	TBC
396	Episode Thirteen	Leigh Jackson	Margy Kinmonth	10 March 1998	TBC
397	Episode Fourteen	Leigh Jackson	Margy Kinmonth	12 March 1998	TBC
398	Episode Fifteen	Tanika Gupta	Margy Kinmonth	17 March 1998	TBC
399	Episode Sixteen	Tanika Gupta	Margy Kinmonth	19 March 1998	TBC
400	Episode Seventeen	Sarah Daniels	Paul Annett	24 March 1998	TBC
401	Episode Eighteen	Sarah Daniels	Paul Annett	26 March 1998	TBC
402	Episode Nineteen	Chris Ellis	Paul Annett	31 March 1998	TBC
403	Episode Twenty	Chris Ellis	Paul Annett	2 April 1998	TBC

== Series 22 (1999) ==
No.	Episode	Writer	Director	Original airdate	UK viewers (millions)
404	Episode One	TBA	Paul Annett	26 January 1999	TBC
405	Episode Two	TBA	Paul Annett	28 January 1999	TBC
406	Episode Three	Diane Whitley	Paul Annett	2 February 1999	TBC
407	Episode Four	Diane Whitley	Paul Annett	4 February 1999	TBC
408	Episode Five	Tim O'Mara	Kate Cheeseman	9 February 1999	TBC
409	Episode Six	Tim O’Mara	Kate Cheeseman	11 February 1999	TBC
410	Episode Seven	Sarah Daniels	Kate Cheeseman	16 February 1999	TBC
411	Episode Eight	Sarah Daniels	Kate Cheeseman	18 February 1999	TBC
412	Episode Nine	Tanika Gupta	Stephen Moore	23 February 1999	TBC
413	Episode Ten	Tanika Gupta	Stephen Moore	25 February 1999	TBC
414	Episode Eleven	Jeff Povey	Stephen Moore	2 March 1999	TBC
415	Episode Twelve	Jeff Povey	Stephen Moore	4 March 1999	TBC
416	Episode Thirteen	Jeff Povey	Matthew Napier	9 March 1999	TBC
417	Episode Fourteen	Jeff Povey	Matthew Napier	11 March 1999	TBC
418	Episode Fifteen	Annie Wood	Dominic MacDonald	16 March 1999	TBC
419	Episode Sixteen	Annie Wood	Dominic MacDonald	18 March 1999	TBC
420	Episode Seventeen	Sarah Daniels	Geoff Feld	23 March 1999	TBC
421	Episode Eighteen	Sarah Daniels	Geoff Feld	25 March 1999	TBC
422	Episode Nineteen	Tim O’Mara	Geoff Feld	30 March 1999	TBC
423	Episode Twenty	Tim O’Mara	Geoff Feld	1 April 1999	TBC

== Series 23 (2000) ==
No.	Episode	Writer	Director	Original airdate	UK viewers (millions)
424	Episode One	Tim O'Mara	Geoff Feld	25 January 2000	TBC
425	Episode Two	Tim O’Mara	Geoff Feld	27 January 2000	TBC
426	Episode Three	Jeff Povey	Geoff Feld	1 February 2000	TBC
427	Episode Four	Jeff Povey	Geoff Feld	3 February 2000	TBC
428	Episode Five	Tanika Gupta	Matthew Napier	8 February 2000	TBC
429	Episode Six	Tanika Gupta	Matthew Napier	10 February 2000	TBC
430	Episode Seven	Philip Gerard	Matthew Napier	15 February 2000	TBC
431	Episode Eight	Philip Gerard	Matthew Napier	17 February 2000	TBC
432	Episode Nine	Sarah Daniels	Jeremy Webb	22 February 2000	TBC
433	Episode Ten	Sarah Daniels	Jeremy Webb	24 February 2000	TBC
434	Episode Eleven	Philip Gladwin	Jeremy Webb	29 February 2000	TBC
435	Episode Twelve	Michael Butt	Jeremy Webb	2 March 2000	TBC
436	Episode Thirteen	Eanna O’Lochlainn	Matthew Napier	7 March 2000	TBC
437	Episode Fourteen	Judy Forshaw	Sue Butterworth	9 March 2000	TBC
438	Episode Fifteen	Judy Forshaw	Susan Butterworth	14 March 2000	TBC
439	Episode Sixteen	Lin Coghlan	Sue Butterworth	16 March 2000	TBC
440	Episode Seventeen	Suzie Smith	Penelope Shales	21 March 2000	TBC
441	Episode Eighteen	Paul Smith	Penelope Shales	23 March 2000	TBC
442	Episode Nineteen	Paul Smith	Penelope Shales	28 March 2000	TBC
443	Episode Twenty	Philip Gerard	Penelope Shales	30 March 2000	TBC

== Series 24 (2001) ==
No.	Episode	Writer	Director	Original airdate	UK viewers (millions)
444	Episode One	Philip Gerard	Grame Harper	23 January 2001	TBC
445	Episode Two	Philip Gerard	Grame Harper	25 January 2001	TBC
446	Episode Three	Paul Smith	Graeme Harper	30 January 2001	TBC
447	Episode Four	Paul Smith	Graeme Harper	1 February 2001	TBC
448	Episode Five	Philip Gladwin	Dez McCarthy	6 February 2001	TBC
449	Episode Six	Philip Gladwin	Dez McCarthy	8 February 2001	TBC
450	Episode Seven	Suzie Smith	Dez McCarthy	13 February 2001	TBC
451	Episode Eight	Eanna O’Lochlainn	Dez McCarthy	15 February 2001	TBC
452	Episode Nine	Mark Hiser & Bridget Colgan	Dominic MacDonald	20 February 2001	TBC
453	Episode Ten	Sarah Daniels	Dominic MacDonald	22 February 2001	TBC
454	Episode Eleven	Sarah Daniels	Dominic MacDonald	27 February 2001	TBC
455	Episode Twelve	Si Spencer	Dominic MacDonald	1 March 2001	TBC
456	Episode Thirteen	Tara Byrne	Sue Butterworth	6 March 2001	TBC
457	Episode Fourteen	Carolyn Sally Jones	Sue Butterworth	8 March 2001	TBC
458	Episode Fifteen	Lin Coghlan	Sue Butterworth	13 March 2001	TBC
459	Episode Sixteen	Lin Coghlan	Sue Butterworth	15 March 2001	TBC
460	Episode Seventeen	Suzie Smith	Angela De Chastelai Smith	20 March 2001	TBC
461	Episode Eighteen	Philip Gerard	Angela De Chastelai Smith	22 March 2001	TBC
462	Episode Nineteen	Philip Gerard	Angela De Chastelai Smith	27 March 2001	TBC
463	Episode Twenty	Si Spencer	Angela De Chastelai Smith	29 March 2001	TBC

== Series 25 (2002) ==
No.	Episode	Writer	Director	Original airdate	UK viewers (millions)
464	Episode One	Si Spencer	Dez McCarthy	29 January 2002	TBC
465	Episode Two	Si Spencer	Dez McCarthy	31 January 2002	TBC
466	Episode Three	Sarah Daniels	Dez McCarthy	5 February 2002	TBC
467	Episode Four	Sarah Daniels	Dez McCarthy	7 February 2002	TBC
468	Episode Five	Tara Byrne	Dominic McDonald	12 February 2002	TBC
469	Episode Six	Tara Byrne	Dominic MacDonald	14 February 2002	TBC
470	Episode Seven	Philip Gerard	Dominic MacDonald	19 February 2002	TBC
471	Episode Eight	Philip Gerald	Dominic MacDonald	21 February 2002	TBC
472	Episode Nine	Helen Eatock	Brett Fallis	26 February 2002	TBC
473	Episode Ten	Lisselle Kayla	Brett Fallis	28 February 2002	TBC
474	Episode Eleven	Rachel Dawson	Brett Fallis	5 March 2002	TBC
475	Episode Twelve	Si Spencer	Brett Fallis	7 March 2002	TBC
476	Episode Thirteen	Philip Gladwin	John Dower	12 March 2002	TBC
477	Episode Fourteen	Philip Gerard	John Dower	14 March 2002	TBC
478	Episode Fifteen	Lin Coghlan	John Dower	19 March 2002	TBC
479	Episode Sixteen	Helen Eatock	John Dower	21 March 2002	TBC
480	Episode Seventeen	Sarah Daniels	Mark Sendell	26 March 2002	TBC
481	Episode Eighteen	Si Spencer	Mark Sendell	28 March 2002	TBC

== Series 26 (2003) ==
No.	Episode	Writer	Director	Original airdate	UK viewers (millions)
482	Episode One	Richard Burke	David Richardson	28 January 2003	TBC
483	Episode Two	Neil Jones	David Richardson	30 January 2003	TBC
484	Episode Three	Kaddy Benyon	Chris Corcoran	4 February 2003	TBC
485	Episode Four	Sarah Daniels	Chris Corcoran	6 February 2003	TBC
486	Episode Five	Richard Burke	David Andrews	11 February 2003	TBC
487	Episode Six	Si Spencer	David Andrews	13 February 2003	TBC
488	Episode Seven	Sarah Daniels	Murilo Pasta	18 February 2003	TBC
489	Episode Eight	Neil Jones	Murilo Pasta	20 February 2003	TBC
490	Episode Nine	Si Spencer	Chris Corcoran	25 February 2003	TBC
491	Episode Ten	Kaddy Benyon	Chris Corcoran	27 February 2003	TBC
492	Episode Eleven	Sarah Daniels	David Andrews	4 March 2003	TBC
493	Episode Twelve	Richard Burke	David Andrews	6 March 2003	TBC
494	Episode Thirteen	Kaddy Benyon	Murilo Pasta	11 March 2003	TBC
495	Episode Fourteen	Richard Burke	Murilo Pasta	13 March 2003	TBC
496	Episode Fifteen	Matthew Evans	Chris Corcoran	18 March 2003	TBC
497	Episode Sixteen	Sarah Daniels	Chris Corcoran	20 March 2003	TBC
498	Episode Seventeen	Si Spencer	Paul Murphy	25 March 2003	TBC
499	Episode Eighteen	Richard Burke	Paul Murphy	27 March 2003	TBC
500	Episode Nineteen	Kaddy Benyon	David Richardson	1 April 2003	TBC
501	Episode Twenty	Neil Jones	David Richardson	3 April 2003	TBC

== Series 27 (2004) ==
No.	Episode	Writer	Director	Original airdate	UK viewers (millions)
502	Episode One	Kaddy Benyon	Paul Murphy	6 January 2004	TBC
503	Episode Two	Sarah Daniels	Paul Murphy	8 January 2004	TBC
504	Episode Three	Neil Jones	Jill Robertson	13 January 2004	TBC
505	Episode Four	Kay Stonham	Jill Robertson	15 January 2004	TBC
506	Episode Five	Matthew Evans	David Andrews	20 January 2004	TBC
507	Episode Six	Richard Burke	David Andrews	22 January 2004	TBC
508	Episode Seven	Richard Burke	Chris Corcoran	27 January 2004	TBC
509	Episode Eight	Matthew Evans	Chris Corcoran	29 January 2004	TBC
510	Episode Nine	Sarah Daniels	Jill Robertson	3 February 2004	TBC
511	Episode Ten	Kaddy Benyon	Jill Robertson	5 February 2004	TBC
512	Episode Eleven	Neil Jones	David Andrews	10 February 2004	TBC
513	Episode Twelve	Kay Stonham	David Andrews	12 February 2004	TBC
514	Episode Thirteen	Richard Burke	Chris Corcoran	17 February 2004	TBC
515	Episode Fourteen	Richard Burke	Chris Corcoran	19 February 2004	TBC
516	Episode Fifteen	Matthew Evans	Peter Hoar	24 February 2004	TBC
517	Episode Sixteen	Sarah Daniels	Peter Hoar	26 February 2004	TBC
518	Episode Seventeen	Kay Stonham	Shani Grewal	2 March 2004	TBC
519	Episode Eighteen	Kaddy Benyon	Shani Grewal	4 March 2004	TBC
520	Episode Nineteen	Neil Jones	Paul Murphy	9 March 2004	TBC
521	Episode Twenty	Neil Jones	David Richardson	11 March 2004	TBC

== Series 28 (2005) ==
No.	Episode	Writer	Director	Original airdate	UK viewers (millions)
522	Episode One	Richard Burke	Peter Hoar	10 January 2005	TBC
523	Episode Two	Heather Robson	Peter Hoar	12 January 2005	TBC
524	Episode Three	Neil Jones	Craig Lines	17 January 2005	TBC
525	Episode Four	Sarah Daniels	Craig Lines	19 January 2005	TBC
526	Episode Five	Matthew Evans	Tessa Hoffe	24 January 2005	TBC
527	Episode Six	Mark P Holloway	Tessa Hoffe	26 January 2005	TBC
528	Episode Seven	Andy Lynch	Peter Hoar	31 January 2005	TBC
529	Episode Eight	Sarah Daniels	Peter Hoar	2 February 2005	TBC
530	Episode Nine	Mark P Holloway	Craig Lines	7 February 2005	TBC
531	Episode Ten	Neil Jones	Craig Lines	9 February 2005	TBC
532	Episode Eleven	Richard Burke	Tessa Hoffe	14 February 2005	TBC
533	Episode Twelve	Matthew Evans	TBA	16 February 2005	TBC
534	Episode Thirteen	Matthew Evans	Chris Johnston	21 February 2005	TBC
535	Episode Fourteen	Neil Jones	Peter Hoar	23 February 2005	TBC
536	Episode Fifteen	Andy Lynch	Peter Hoar	28 February 2005	TBC
537	Episode Sixteen	Sarah Daniels	Chris Johnston	2 March 2005	TBC
538	Episode Seventeen	Matthew Evans	Paul Murphy	14 March 2005	TBC
539	Episode Eighteen	Mark P Holloway	Paul Murphy	16 March 2005	TBC
540	Episode Nineteen	Heather Robinson	Tessa Hoffe	21 March 2005	TBC
541	Episode Twenty	Richard Burke	Tessa Hoffe	23 March 2005	TBC

== Series 29 (2005) ==
No.	Episode	Writer	Director	Original airdate	UK viewers (millions)
542	Episode One	Phil Redmond	Paul Murphy	7 November 2005	TBC
543	Episode Two	Heather Robson	Paul Murphy	8 November 2005	TBC
544	Episode Three	Neil Jones	Chris Johnston	9 November 2005	TBC
545	Episode Four	Phil Redmond	TBA	10 November 2005	TBC
546	Episode Five	Phil Redmond	TBA	11 November 2005	TBC
547	Episode Six	Andy Lynch	Paul Murphy	14 November 2005	TBC
548	Episode Seven	Sarah Daniels	Daikin Marsh	15 November 2005	TBC
549	Episode Eight	Kaddy Benyon	Daikin Marsh	16 November 2005	TBC
550	Episode Nine	Neil Jones	Jayne Chard	17 November 2005	TBC
551	Episode Ten	Richard Burke	Jayne Chard	18 November 2005	TBC
552	Episode Eleven	Kaddy Benyon	Chris Johnston	21 November 2005	TBC
553	Episode Twelve	Sarah Daniels	Chris Johnston	22 November 2005	TBC
554	Episode Thirteen	Heather Robson	Paul Murphy	23 November 2005	TBC
555	Episode Fourteen	Richard Burke	Paul Murphy	24 November 2005	TBC
556	Episode Fifteen	Andy Lynch	Daikin Marsh	25 November 2005	TBC
557	Episode Sixteen	Kaddy Benyon	Daikin Marsh	28 November 2005	TBC
558	Episode Seventeen	Heather Robson	Dusan Lazarevic	29 November 2005	TBC
559	Episode Eighteen	Sarah Daniels	Dusan Lazarevic	30 November 2005	TBC
560	Episode Nineteen	Neil Jones	Chris Johnston	1 December 2005	TBC
561	Episode Twenty	Kaddy Benyon	Chris Johnston	2 December 2005	TBC

== Series 30 (2007) ==
No.	Episode	Writer	Director	Original airdate	UK viewers (millions)
562	Episode One	Phil Redmond	Nigel Keen	16 January 2007	TBC
563	Episode Two	Neil Jones	Nigel Keen	18 January 2007	TBC
564	Episode Three	Heather Robson	TBA	23 January 2007	TBC
565	Episode Four	Andy Lynch	Craig Lines	25 January 2007	TBC
566	Episode Five	Sarah Daniels	Daikin Marsh	30 January 2007	TBC
567	Episode Six	Heather Robson	Daikin Marsh	1 February 2007	TBC
568	Episode Seven	Sarah Daniels	Gill Wilkinson	6 February 2007	TBC
569	Episode Eight	Neil Jones	Gill Wilkinson	8 February 2007	TBC
570	Episode Nine	Andy Lynch	Tris Burns	13 February 2007	TBC
571	Episode Ten	David Hanson	Tris Burns	15 February 2007	TBC
572	Episode Eleven	Neil Jones	Nigel Keen	20 February 2007	TBC
573	Episode Twelve	David Hanson	Nigel Keen	22 February 2007	TBC
574	Episode Thirteen	Andy Lynch	Craig Lines	27 February 2007	TBC
575	Episode Fourteen	Sarah Daniels	Craig Lines	1 March 2007	TBC
576	Episode Fifteen	Heather Robson	Tris Burns	6 March 2007	TBC
577	Episode Sixteen	Sarah Daniels	Tris Burns	8 March 2007	TBC
578	Episode Seventeen	Andy Lynch	Mark Sendell	13 March 2007	TBC
579	Episode Eighteen	Neil Jones	Marc Sendell	15 March 2007	TBC
580	Episode Nineteen	Heather Robson	Nigel Keen	20 March 2007	TBC
581	Episode Twenty	David Hanson	Nigel Keen	22 March 2007	TBC

== Series 31 (2008) ==
No.	Episode	Writer	Director	Original airdate	UK viewers (millions)
582	New Beginnings	Phil Redmond	Trish Burns	14 April 2008	TBC
583	Boarderman	Neil Jones	Tracey Rooney	21 April 2008	TBC
584	Election Day	Neil Jones	Tim Hopewell	28 April 2008	TBC
585	The Double Cross Country	David Hanson	Trish Burns	12 May 2008	TBC
586	Food Fight	David Hanson	Tracey Rooney	19 May 2008	TBC
587	The Thing About Mates	Heather Robson	Tim Hopewell	2 June 2008	TBC
588	Buddy Hell	David Hanson	AdrianBean	9 June 2008	TBC
589	You're Nicked	David Hanson	Tim Hopewell	16 June 2008	TBC
590	Extra Terrestri-Hill	Neil Jones	Adrian Bean	23 June 2008	TBC
591	Schmutts	Heather Robson	Gill Wilkinson	30 June 2008	TBC
592	Building Bridges	Martin Riley	Tim Hopewell	7 July 2008	TBC
593	Veggin Out	Jessica Lea	Eddy Marshall	14 July 2008	TBC
594	The Competition	Neil Jones	Gill Wilkinson	21 July 2008	TBC
595	Gift Rapped	David Hanson	Tim Hopewell	28 July 2008	TBC
596	Who Are You?	David Hanson	Eddy Marshall	4 August 2008	TBC
597	Grapple	Neil Jones	Tim Hopewell	11 August 2008	TBC
598	Where There's Justice?	Heather Robson	Eddy Marshall	18 August 2008	TBC
599	Virtual Reality	Martin Riley	Gill Wilkinson	1 September 2008	TBC
600	Zut Alors!	David Hanson	Gill Wilkinson	8 September 2008	TBC
601	Bang	Neil Jones	Eddy Marshall	15 September 2008	
