= Consumer socialization =

Consumer socialization (alternatively spelled socialisation) is the process by which young people acquire skills, knowledge and attitudes relevant to their functioning as consumers in the marketplace. It has been argued, however, that consumer socialization occurs in the adult years as well. This field of study is a subdivision of consumer behavior as its main focus is on how childhood and adolescent experiences affect future consumer behavior. It attempts to understand how factors such as peers, mass media, family, gender, ethnicity, and culture play an influence in developing customer behavior.

This field of study has increasingly interested policy makers, marketers, consumer educators and students of socialization.

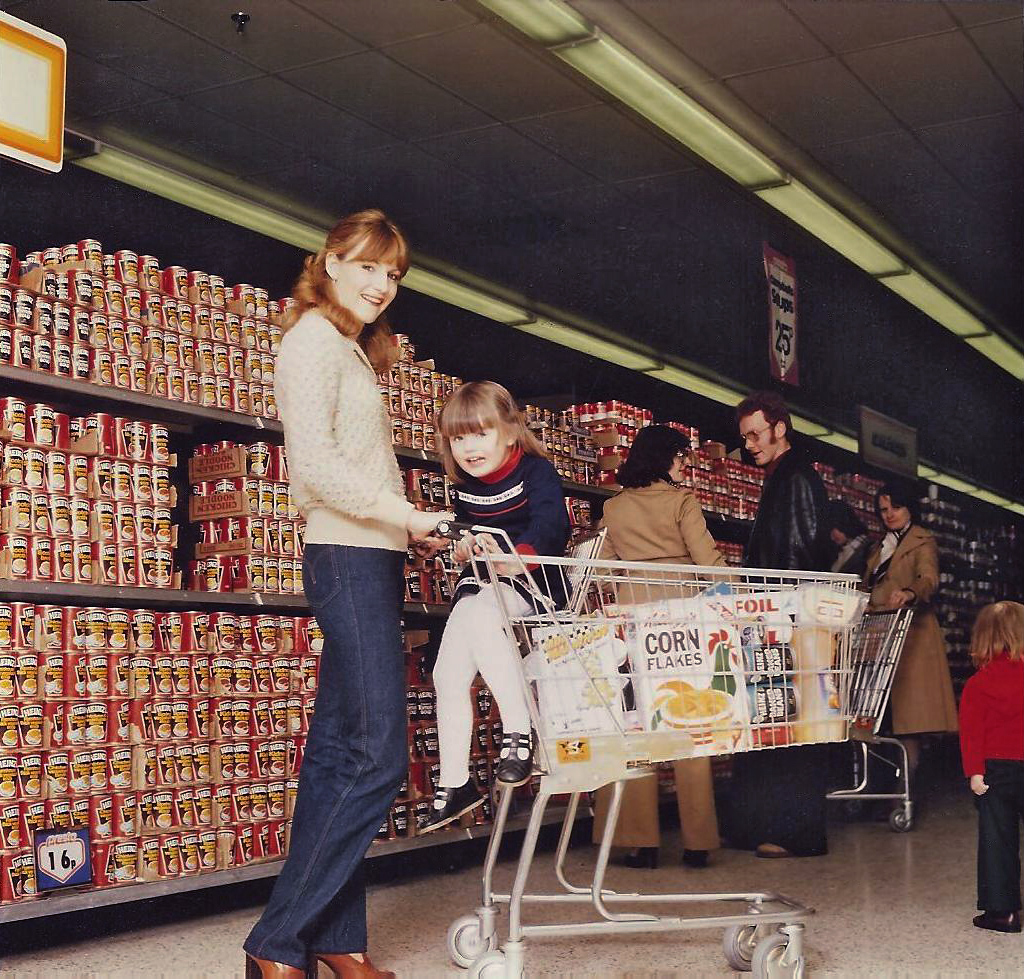
Mothers tend to have the most influence in consumer development and can teach consumer behavior through observation, direct discussions, and parent supervision.

== Influences ==
George Moschis and Gilbert A. Churchill Jr posit that mass media, parents, school and peers are all agents of consumer socialization. According to this theory children and young adults learn the rational aspects of consumption from their parents while the mass media teaches them to give social meaning to products; schools teach the importance of economic wisdom and finally peers exercise varying social pressures.

Research in this field is primarily based on two models of human learning: the cognitive development model, which stem primarily from the works of Jean Piaget, and the social learning model, which is based primarily on neo-Hullian, neo-Skinnerian and social learning theory.

This aspect of child socialization started receiving academic attention in early 1970s. Systematic academic research in this area was triggered by charges of various consumer advocacy groups which were concerned with the effects of marketing, especially TV advertising on children.

=== Peers ===
Adolescents tend to rely more on peers, such as friends and classmates, to develop their consumer behavior compared to television and family.

=== Television and advertisements ===
Mass media has been shown to be as important of a socialization agent as family and peers. Children learn from observation so by viewing advertisements and lifestyles from a television show they will develop their consumer behavior as well as leaning consumer role perceptions.

=== Family ===
Family is a major influence in consumer socialization. Parent-child socialization is an adult initiated process by which developing children, through insight, training, and imitation acquire the habits and values congruent with adaptation to their culture. Mothers tend to have the most influence in consumer development and can teach consumer behavior through observation, direct discussions, and parent supervision.

Parenting style plays an important role in consumer socialization because parent-child interactions determine how parents teach their child consumer behavior. Parents who have a higher degree of smooth communication with their children and have more obedient that will have a higher impact. During daily smooth communication, parents' consumption preferences and attitudes will also affect their children consumption. Parents who have negative attitudes toward television advertising tend to have children who request fewer purchases and are more consumer educated. Children who spend less time with parents and other familial ties are more likely to be affected by peers and media than children who spend time with their family.

The influence that other familial connections, such as siblings and grandparents, may have on consumer socialization has not been studied as extensively as parents. Siblings has been found to rely on each other to gain information on the marketplace.

=== Gender ===
Gender has been identified as a critical social structure variable in consumer socialization. Women tend to have a more positive attitude toward advertisements than males. Young girls and teenagers are more affected by peer and family influence than boys. Young girls are also more likely to deem a brand their favorite based on whether their friends have them.

Boys tend to be more influenced by non-personal communication than interpersonal interactions.

=== Race ===
African Americans tend to watch more hours of television a week and watch different types of television programs compared to their Caucasian counterparts. African Americans rely more on television as a form of consumer socialization than family. African Americans also have a more positive attitude toward advertisements than their Caucasian counterparts. African Americans tend to buy the same brand rather than competing brands.

In Asian cultures, parents and peers tend to have a greater influence on consumer socialization than television. This may be due to Asian cultures' tendency to behave in ways that are best for the community rather than for the individual. This close-knit community leads to a reliance on referrals and word-of-mouth.

Hispanic cultures, like Asian cultures, are family-oriented and can be considered to be collectivist. Hispanic children tend to depend on parents and peers to learn more about consumer behavior.

== See also ==
- Consumerism
- Consumer culture
- Self brand § Development of self brand concepts
