= Self-constancy =

Psychological concept

Self-constancy, also called self-object constancy and self-consistency, is a psychological concept of developmental cognitive ability. The theory was developed by Prescott Lecky in the 1920s, and the term "self-constancy" was coined by Heinz Hartmann in 1952. Self-constancy focuses on the regulation of thoughts and ideas, which generally develop from childhood. The constancy of ideas and the representation of the self are both essential for an average person. Self-constancy organizes an individual's thoughts and behavior to maintain consistency. Self-constancy relates to the development and success of interpersonal relationships, and defective self-consistency can sometimes result in borderline personality disorder.

== Background ==
Self-constancy describes the ability to hold images of oneself and another person as both positive and negative at the same time. Another way it is defined is the capacity to accept the advantages and disadvantages of both the other and oneself; by either definition, maintained self-constancy is considered a byproduct of maturity.

According to Freudian theories, the lack of this ability can cause the Ego to split into all-positive and all-negative. 'Splitting of the Ego' makes it impossible to view the other and oneself as both positive and negative at the same time. This results in the other or oneself feeling positive at one moment, and suddenly experiencing negative emotions when faced with disappointment. In relationships, it manifests in oneself or the other as being wonderful in one moment, and then terrible in the next moment. Splitting weakens the ability to hold these concepts as opposites. Holding arguments with the opposites at the same time is the ability to have self-constancy.

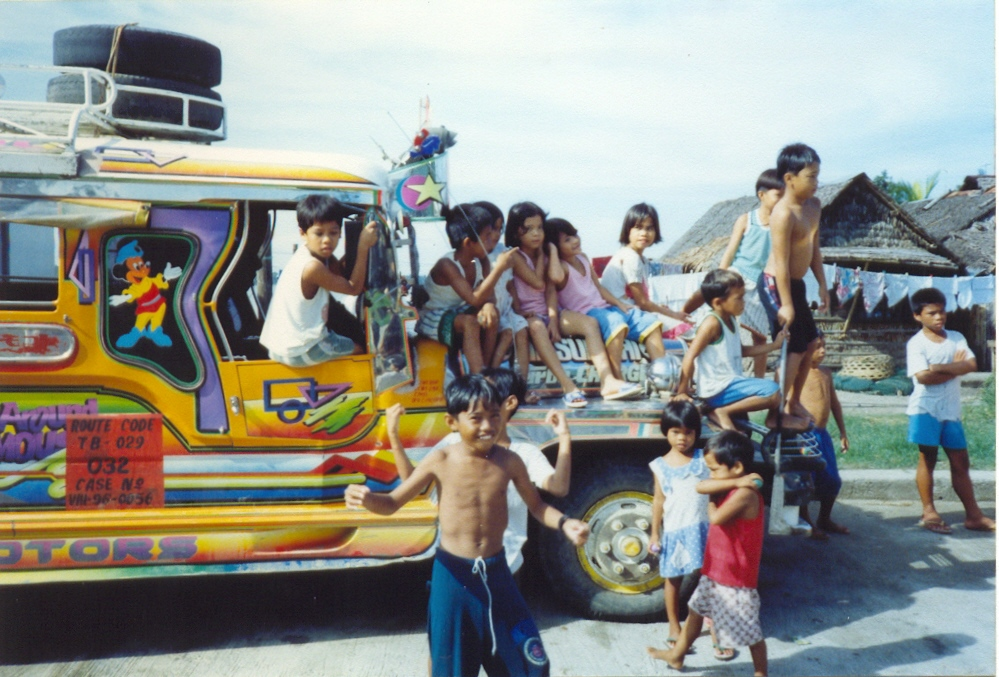
Children having fun on a bus

== Development in childhood ==
Self-constancy is an important step in childhood cognitive and libidinal development. It is based on object relations theory, a branch of psychoanalysis that focuses on family relationships; the link between childhood and adulthood. Many psychologists agree that self-constancy is the stage of development when a child develops libidinal and cognitive attachment to the mother.

According to Piaget's theory, self-object constancy is one part of the sensorimotor stage of childhood development. This stage starts at birth and ends around age two. During this period, a child's view of the world broadens drastically. The child learns to see the world and other people as an extension of itself and develops the understanding that objects can and do exist outside of itself. Psychoanalyst and clinical researcher Margaret Mahler defines self-constancy as a child's ability to be independent of its mother for increasing periods of time. This ability emerges because of an increasingly stable inner representation of the self.

If a child's primary caregiver is 'strong', the child will be less likely to have self-object constancy issues as an adult. Adults without self-constancy issues understand that circumstances, such as separation or conflict, do not cause a significant other to abandon or reject them, and will be more likely to successfully maintain a monogamous relationship as a result. These mutually satisfying bonds benefit not only an individual's partner, but also their friends, colleagues, and extended family.

On the other hand, childhood disruption of the sense that relationships are reliable, stable, and consistent will likely leave traces during adulthood. In adulthood, self-constancy allows individuals to implicitly trust people who are close to them, regardless of external pressures.
