= Parental age =

Parental age is the age of parents. It may refer to:

- Father's age
- Mother's age
