= Reciprocal socialization =

Bidirectional parent-child socialization process

In sociology, reciprocal socialization "is a socialization process that is bidirectional; children socialize parents just as parents socialize children". For example, the interaction of mothers and their infants is sometimes symbolized as a dance or dialogue in which following actions of the partners are closely coordinated. This coordinated dance or dialogue can assume the form of mutual synchrony, or it can be reciprocal in a more precise sense. The actions of the partners can be matched, as when one partner imitates the other or when there is mutual smiling.

When reciprocal socialization has been investigated in infancy, mutual gaze or eye contact has been found to play an important role in early social interaction. "In one investigation, the mother and infant engaged in a variety of behaviors while they looked at each other; by contrast, when they looked away from each other, the rate of such behaviors dropped considerably".

"In short, the behaviors of mothers and infants involve substantial interconnection and synchronization. And in some investigations, synchrony in parent-child relationships was positively related to children’s social competence. One example of parental response to children’s behavior is the elicitation of scaffolding behavior, which in turn affects the level of behavior children show in the future. Scaffolding refers to parental behavior that serves to support children’s efforts, allowing them to be more skillful than they would if they relied only on their own abilities. For example, in the game peek-a-boo, parents initially cover their babies, then remove the covering, and finally register "surprise" at the babies' reappearance. As infants become more skilled at peek-a-boo, infants gradually do some of the covering and uncovering. Parents try to time their actions in such a way that the infant takes turns with the parent. In addition to peek-a-boo, pat-a-cake and "so-big" are other caregiver games that exemplify scaffolding and turn-taking sequences. Scaffolding can be used to support children's efforts at any age". "In one investigation, infants who had more extensive scaffolding experiences with their parents, especially in the form of turn taking, were more likely to engage in turn taking as they interacted with their peers".

Note: Studies concerning the relationship of culture and reciprocal socialization could not be found.
