= Buddha Multiplex Hotel & Management =

College in Gaya, Bihar, India

- Type: Private
- Founders: Er. Awadhesh Kumar
- Affiliations: MMHAPU
- Location: Gaya, Bihar, India
- Website: www.buddhattc.org

Buddha Multiplex Hotel & Management, also known by BMHM, Gaya is a unit of Buddha Group of Institutions, it is a Teacher Training college situated in Gaya, Bihar, India. The college, approved by NCTE and UGC for courses B.Ed. & D.El.Ed and affiliated by MMHAPU for B.Ed. & BSEB for D.El.Ed from 2010.

== Courses ==
- B.Ed
- D.El.Ed

== See also ==
- List of teacher education schools in India
- Teacher Training College, Gaya
