= List of teacher education schools in India =

This is a list of teacher education schools in India by state.

== Bihar ==
- Women's Training College Patna - Patna University
- Amaltas College of Education, Aryabhatta Knowledge University
- Patna Training College Patna - Patna University
- St. Xavier's College of Education
- Dr. S. P. Singh College Of Teacher Education
- Anugrah Memorial B.Ed. College, Gaya
- Rahmani B.Ed. College, Munger
- Islamia teacher training college, Phulbari, Patna
- Shakuntalam Institute of Teacher Education, Sasaram, Rohtas-821111

== Dadra and Nagar Haveli and Daman and Diu ==
- SSR College of Education

== Delhi ==
- Delhi Teachers University
- National Institute of Teacher Education, Delhi
- Central Institute Of Education/ Department of Education
- Great Mission Teacher Training Institute, Delhi
- Jamia Millia Islamia, Teacher Training College, Delhi
- Indoss, Teacher Training Institute, Delhi
- Teachers Training Delhi, Asian College of Teachers, Delhi

== Gujarat ==
- Calrox Teacher's University, Ahmedabad
- Indian Institute of Teacher Education, Gandhinagar
- B.D. Shah College of Teacher Education (C.T.E., MHRD), Modasa, Aravalli

== Himachal Pradesh ==
- Government College of Teacher Education Dharamsala

== Kerala ==
- Government College of Teacher Education, Kozhikkode www.gctecalicut.in
- St. Thomas College of Teacher Education, Pala
- T.D Teacher Training Institute, Mattancherry, Kochi-2
- University College of Teacher Education Vaikom

== Madhya Pradesh ==
- Mahatma Gandhi Chitrakoot Gramoday University
- National Institute of Technical Teachers' Training and Research Bhopal

== Odisha ==
- Training Centre for Teachers of the Deaf, Bhubaneswar
- Regional Institute of Education, Bhubaneswar

== Puducherry ==
- Mahé Co-operative College of Teacher Education (MCCTE)

== Punjab ==
- Desh Bhagat School of Education Desh Bhagat University, Mandi Gobindgarh
- Government College of Education, Chandigarh
- Government Teacher Training College (Chandigarh, India)
- Sri Sai Group of Institutes (Pathankot, Amritsar, Palampur)

== Uttarakhand ==
- Motiram Baburam Govt. Post Graduate College

== Uttar Pradesh ==
- Saamarthya Teachers Training Academy of Research, (STTAR), Seth Anandram Jaipuria Group
- College of Education- The Glocal University, Saharanpur

== Tamil Nadu ==
- Amrita College of Education
- Annai Teresa College of Education, B.Ed. College, Ariyakudi, Sivaganga district
- Anai Angel Teacher Training Institute for Women (Roever's Institute), Perambalur
- Bishop Agniswamy College of Education
- Christian Education College, Perambalur
- Dhanalakshmi Srinivasan B.Ed., Teacher Training College, Perambalur
- Eden Garden Education College, Perambalur
- Elizabeth Education College, Perambalur
- ERK College of Education, Erumiyampatti
- G.E.T B.Ed College, Gudiyattam
- J.R.S college of Education, Perambalur
- J.R.S Teacher Training college, Perambalur
- Roever College Of Education, Perambalur
- Roever Teacher Training For Men, Perambalur
- St. Joseph College of Education
- Stella Matutina College of Education
- Tamil Nadu Teachers Education University
- Srinivasan Teacher Training College, Perambalur
- Swami Vivekanandha Teacher Training Institute, Perambalur
- Thanthai Hans Roever B.Ed., and Teacher Training, Perambalur
- Vidhyaa Giri College of Arts and Science B.Ed, Karaikudi, Sivagangai
- V.O.C. College OF Education, Thoothukudi
- KAPI college of education Nagamalai, Madurai -19
- KAPI Women's college of education Nagamalai, Madurai -19

== West Bengal ==
- Ramakrishna Mission Siksha Mandir
- Vidyasagar Teachers' Training College

== See also ==
- Bachelor of Education
- Educational programs or approaches
  - Agastya International Foundation - a Bangalore-based education trust
  - Muktangan - a pioneering educational programme for teacher education
  - XSEED Education
- National Award for Teachers (India)
- National Council for Teacher Education
- National Council for Teacher Education Act, 1993
- Organization by field of study
  - Association of Mathematics Teachers of India
  - Association of Pharmaceutical Teachers of India
  - Homi Bhabha Centre for Science Education
- Teacher Eligibility Test
