= Gender inequality in curricula =

Gender inequality in curriculum exposes indications that female and male learners are not treated equally in various types of curriculum. There are two types of curricula: formal and informal. Formal curricula are introduced by a government or an educational institution. Moreover, they are defined as sets of objectives, content, resources and assessment. Informal curricula, also defined as hidden or unofficial, refer to attitudes, values, beliefs, assumptions, behaviours and undeclared agendas underlying the learning process. These are formulated by individuals, families, societies, religions, cultures and traditions.

More particularly, gender inequality is apparent in the curriculum of both schools and Teacher Education Institutes (TEIs). Physical education (PE) is particularly delicate, as gender equality issues coming from preconceived stereotyping of boys and girls often arise. It is often believed that boys are better at physical exercise than girls and that these are better at 'home' activities including sewing and cooking. This belief prevails in many cultures around the world and is not bound to one culture only.

== Curriculum language and gender ==
Some curricular objectives show that the language used is gender biased. Indeed, it can happen that the language itself can communicate the status of being male or female, and the status of being assertive or submissive. In many cultures, 'being male' is expressed in language as being confident. In Japan, according to Pavlenko, female Japanese learners are led 'to see English as a language of empowerment. The students state that ... the pronoun system of English allow[s] them to position and express themselves differently as more independent individuals than when speaking Japanese.' This example clearly shows how languages, reflecting cultures, are the basis for introducing gender inequalities highlighting the curricula.

== Curriculum structure and gender ==
Many Teacher Education Institutes (TEIs) around the world, which set curricula, that is; teaching diplomas, show a worrying shortcoming regarding issues of gender equality. For instance, students who prove being prepared to become schoolteachers are taught education theories, the psychology of learning, teaching methodologies and class management, among others and one or two practical courses. There is no highlight on gender equality-related issues in their training. Even courses on curriculum design ignore these issues. This omission is highly problematic and should be addressed by curriculum designers of TEIs. It is important that gender equality issues are part of the curriculum in order to help future teachers to be more sensitive about gender equality issues. Thus when they become teachers, they can become agents of change in their schools.

== Content of instructional materials and gender ==
Several studies have shown that textbooks reinforce traditional views of masculinity and femininity and encourage children to accept a traditional gender order. For example, a recent study conducted by Kostas (2019) found that female characters in textbooks of primary education portrayed mainly as mothers and housewives whilst male characters were identified as breadwinners. Additionally, teachers often use materials, including texts, images or examples that reinforce stereotyped roles. Typical examples given include, roles of the father (reading the newspaper) and the mother (serving dinner); the doctor (male) and the nurse (female); playing ball (boy) and combing doll's hair (girl). By doing this, teachers are also promoting gender bias which favors girls as well. For instance, bullying and noise-making for boys and politeness and gentleness for girls. Gender bias does not only favor males over females; it can also go the other way around. They are both negative when considering a healthy relationship between the teacher and the learner.

== A gender equal curriculum ==
A gender equal curriculum shows the diversity of society when increasing examples that highlight successful female characters in texts as well as in the examples used during classes. Instructional materials, including textbooks, handouts or workbooks, should be studied to determine whether they are gender biased, gender neutral or gender-sensitive/responsive. In Teacher Education Institutes (TEIs), curricula need to include elements that recognize gender equality-related issues in learning materials, and how those issues can be faced by teachers once they take up the profession and start to use these materials in their classes.

Quality curriculum should include gender equality as a result of teaching and learning in TEIs, as well as in schools. Educational systems that adopt gender equality aspects are able to:

- Revise its curriculum framework to explicitly state commitment to gender equality.
- Emphasize attitudes and values that promote gender equality.
- Ensure that the content of the course syllabus includes values and attitudes of gender equality. Revise textbooks and learning materials to become gender-sensitive.
- Remove gender-based stereotypes that contribute towards perpetuating gender inequalities.

== Approaches in preventing gender inequality and school-related gender-based violence ==
It is possible to integrate school-related gender-based violence (SRGBV) prevention into the curriculum for children of all school-going ages. Topics include comprehensive sexuality education (CSE), life skills education, civics education and targeted approaches on managing aggression, developing bystander skills, forming healthy relationships and protection from bullying – these elements are often combined.

=== Examples ===
==== The World Starts with Me, Uganda ====
In 2002, two Dutch NGOs including the World Population Foundation and Butterfly Works, created The World Starts with me. Aimed at students aged 12 – 19 years old, it is a low-tech, online, interactive sex education programme. The programme uses David and Rose, two virtual peer educators who guide students through fourteen lessons around self-esteem, healthy relationships, sexual development, safer sex, gender equality and sexual rights. Each lesson includes an assignment-type lesson, for instance creating a storyboard, an art work or conducting a role play on the topic of that lesson. Evaluation of the programme (with the use of a quasi-experimental design) showed a significant positive effects on non-coercive sex within students in intervention groups. Indeed, they reported having more confidence in their ability to deal with situations where sexual pressure and force would be used.

==== Programs H and M, Brazil ====
Named after the Spanish and Portuguese words for men and women (hombres in Sp., homes in Port., mujeres in Sp., mulheres in Port.), the programs H and M used an evidence-based curriculum and included a group of educational activities which were designed to be carried out in same-sex group settings, as well as by same-sex facilitators of the groups, who can eventually be consider as gender-equitable role models.

The manuals used by these programmes include activities on fatherhood/motherhood and caregiving, violence prevention, sexual and reproductive health including HIV/AIDS and other related issues. The activities of the programme included brainstorming role-playing and other exercises which contributed to students reflecting on how boys and girls socialized and the pros and cons of this socialization and to explore the benefits of changing certain behaviours.

The programme was evaluated in several locations through mostly quasi-experimental studies. It showed evidence of positive changes in participants' gender-equitable attitudes and behaviours and showed reduced gender-based violence.

==== Fourth R, Canada ====
This programme is based on the belief that relationship knowledge and skills can and should be taught in the same way as reading, writing and arithmetic, which gives the program its name. The programme is taught with children of grades 8 - 12.

Thanks to a five-year randomized control trial of the classes with Grade 9 students (aged between 14 and 15), it was found that when comparing, students who received standard health classes students (especially boys) who received the Fourth R used significantly fewer acts of violence towards a dating partner by the end of Grade 11.

==== Second Step, United States ====
This Second Step program teaches skills such as communication, coping and decision-making with the objective to help young people navigate peer pressure, substance abuse and in person and online bullying. The aforementioned programme has been used with more than 8 million students in over 32,000 American schools.

A two-year cluster-randomized clinical trial of Second Step was carried out with over 3,600 students at 36 middle schools in Grades 6 and 7 (aged 11–13 years) in Illinois and Kansas. At the end of the programme, the study found that, students in Illinois intervention schools were 39 per cent less likely to report sexual violence perpetration and 56 per cent less likely to self-report homophobic name-calling victimization than students in control schools. There was, however, no significant difference in the Kansas schools.

==== The Gender Equity Movement in Schools (GEMS), India ====
The GEMS project used extracurricular activities, role-playing and games. This project began in the sixth grade and worked for two years with boys and girls between the ages of 12–14 in public schools in Goa, Kota and Mumbai. In Goa and Kota, it was layered with ongoing school curriculum. In Mumbai, it was run as an independent pilot project in 45 schools.

An evaluation study was implemented on the pilot which using a quasi-experimental design to assess the results of the programme on the students. Over the course of the programme, the study found that participating students were more supportive of girls pursuing higher education and marrying later in life, and of boys and men contributing to household tasks. However, an important component of GEMS, students' behaviours and attitudes around reducing violence proved mixed results. The GEMS approach will now be carried out in up to 250 schools in Mumbai, following the success of the first pilot programme. It is also being rolled out in 20 schools in Viet Nam.

== See also ==
- Gender equity in education
- Gender mainstreaming in teacher education policy
- Educational inequality
- Education sector responses to LGBT violence
- Sexual harassment in education
- School-related gender-based violence (SRGBV)
