= Child sexual abuse in Canada =

The article covers child sexual abuse in Canada, a form of child abuse in which an adult or older adolescent engages in sexual act(s) with a child.

Previous statistics have shown that about a third of girls and one sixth of boys are victims of sexual assault in Canada. In 2016, results from a national representative survey indicated that the sexual abuse of children has been declining in Canada since the early 1990s but is still higher than the global average.

In Canada, child sexual offences also include the access and use of child pornography, since the use of these materials indirectly harms a child. Child pornographic offences are considered child sexual abuse, since its production involves direct sexual abuse of a child. The criminal justice system has been transitioning the term of child pornography to "child sexual abuse materials" and/or "child sexual exploitation materials" as these terms essentially underline the fact that children are being sexually abused. By contrast, "child pornography" has an underlying tone that these materials are erotic and are intentionally used for sexual arousal purposes.

== Prevention ==
In prompt response to this issue, several prevention initiatives have taken place:

- Little Warriors works at a national level to reduce the stigma of child sexual abuse, and have ongoing workshops to help caregivers spot signs of sexual abuse.
- Calgary Communities Against Sexual Abuse has launched several initiatives in preventing child sexual abuse, including the Third Option, which allows victims to store evidence against offenders and choose whether to report after a year.
- The Prevention Study is an initiative that aims to prevent sexual offences against children by treating people who have not offended and feel they are at risk of offending (also see Prevention Project Dunkelfeld).
- Cybertip.ca is a Canadian national tip-line to report online child sexual exploitation.
- Canadian Centre for Child Protection (CCCP) is a national charity that aims to reduce and prevent child sexual abuse and exploitation. It has several ongoing research projects, such as Project Arachnid, which is an automated webcrawler that actively reduces the availability of child sexual abuse materials on the Internet.

== Penalties for child sexual abuse ==
The Criminal Code indicates that the following charges are considered hands-on sexual offences: Sexual interference on persons under age 16, sexual assault on persons under age 16, and invitation to sexual touching. Child pornography-related offences under the Criminal Code include: Making child pornography, Make available/distribute child pornography, Access child pornography, and Possession of child pornography. In addition, offenders might be placed on the Section 161 order, which restricts interactions with minors (age 16 and below). Offenders might also be placed on the Sexual Offender Registry for either 5 years, 10 years, or a lifetime.

Those who have been convicted of these offences might have the option of serving weekend sentences while getting treatment for their problematic sexual interests and/or behaviors. Currently, Canada does not have any public/community notification laws. Many studies have shown that there is no empirical support that public notification laws are effective at preventing sexual re-offences. In fact, research has shown that public notification laws might present more problems than help. There have been emerging studies that show treatment efforts may be more effective at reducing sexual re-offences.

== See also ==
- Catholic Church sexual abuse cases in Canada
- Prevention Project Dunkelfeld
- Sexual abuse in primary and secondary schools
- School-related gender-based violence
- List of youth detention incidents in Canada
