= Teacher education =

Training teachers to develop teaching skills

Teacher education or teacher training refers to programs, policies, procedures, and provision designed to equip (prospective) teachers with the knowledge, attitudes, behaviors, approaches, methodologies and skills they require to perform their tasks effectively in the classroom, school, and wider community. The professionals who train prospective teachers are called teacher educators (or, in some contexts, teacher trainers).

There is a longstanding and ongoing debate about the most appropriate term to describe these activities. The term 'teacher training' (which may give the impression that the activity involves training staff to undertake relatively routine tasks) seems to be losing ground, at least in the U.S., to 'teacher education' (with its connotation of preparing staff for a professional role as a reflective practitioner). The two major components of teacher education are in-service teacher education and pre-service teacher education.

== Teacher training ==
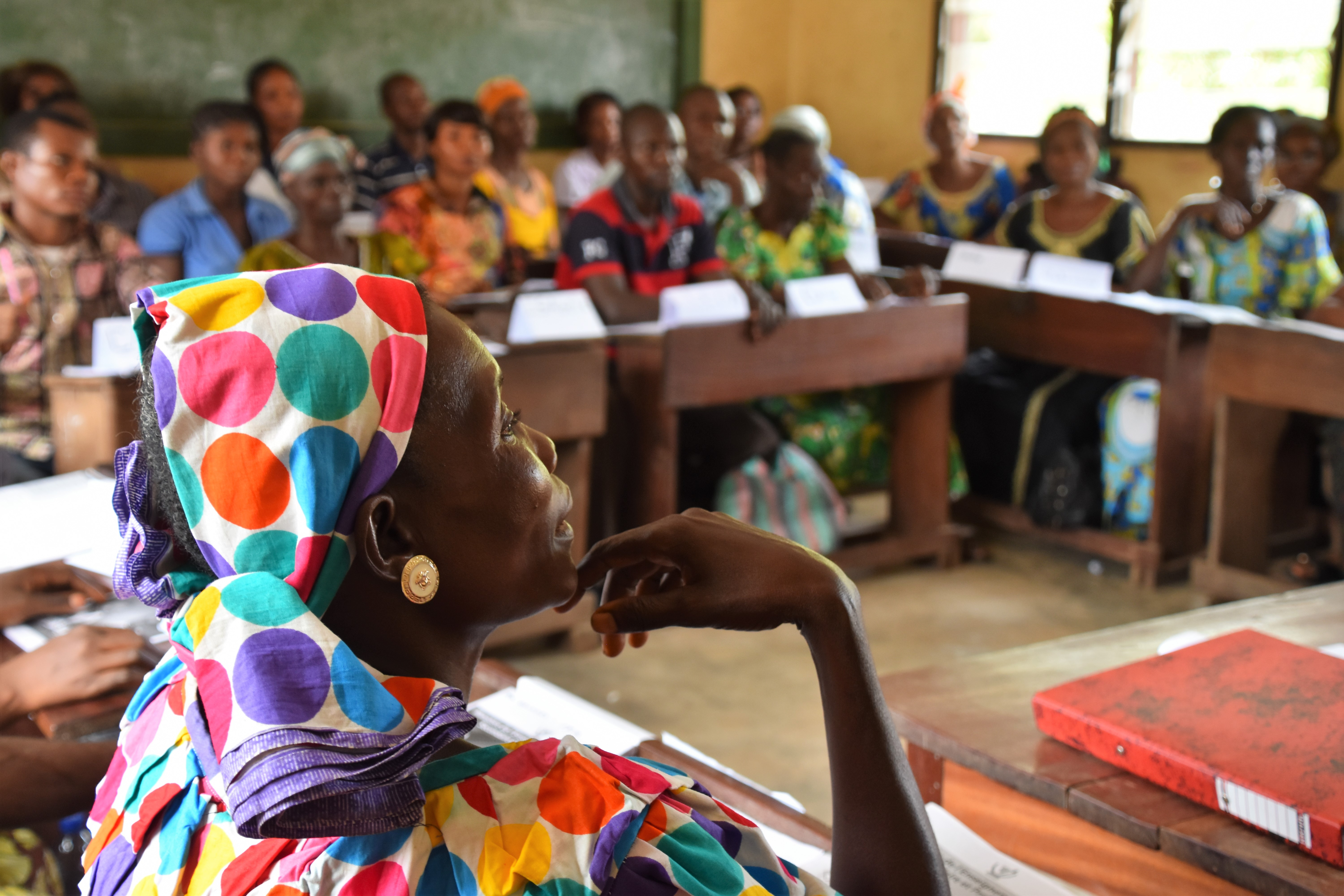
Teacher training, DRC

Although ideally teacher education should be conceived of, and organized as, a seamless continuum, teacher education is often divided into these stages:

- initial teacher training/education: a pre-service course before entering the classroom as a fully responsible teacher
- induction: the process of providing training and support during the first few years of teaching or the first year in a particular school
- teacher development or continuing professional development: an in-service process for practicing teachers.

=== Initial ===
==== Organization ====
In many countries, Initial Teacher Education (also known as preservice teacher training) takes place largely or exclusively in institutions of higher education. In countries like Sri Lanka, there are separate institutes called National colleges of Education to provide pre-service teacher training, while Teacher Training Colleges provide in-service teacher education. Further institutes called Teacher Centers provide continuing professional development for teachers. It may be organized according to two basic models:

- in the consecutive model, a teacher first obtains a qualification in one or more subjects (often a diploma in teaching or an undergraduate bachelor's degree), and then studies for a further period to gain an additional qualification in teaching (this may take the form of a post-baccalaureate credential or master's degree).
- in the alternative concurrent model, a student simultaneously studies both one or more academic subjects and the ways of teaching those subjects, leading to a combined bachelor's degree and teaching credential to qualify as a teacher of those subjects.

Other pathways are also available. In some countries, a person can receive teacher training by working in a school under the supervision of an accredited, experienced practitioner.

In the United Kingdom, there is a long tradition of partnerships between universities and schools in providing state-supported teacher education. This tradition is not without tensions and controversies.

In the United States, approximately one-third of new teachers enter the profession through alternative routes to teacher certification, according to testimony by Emily Feistritzer, the President of the National Center for Alternative Certification and the National Center for Education Information, before a congressional subcommittee on May 17, 2007. However, many alternative pathways are affiliated with schools of education, where candidates still enroll in university-based coursework. A supplemental component of university-based coursework is community-based teacher education, in which teacher candidates immerse themselves in communities to apply teaching theory in practice. Community-based teacher education also challenges teacher candidates' assumptions about gender, race, and multicultural diversity. This assists in fostering an attitudinal change among teacher trainees to eliminate segregation within the school community.

==== Curriculum ====
The question of what knowledge, attitudes, behaviors, approaches, methodologies, and skills teachers should possess is the subject of much debate in many cultures. This is understandable, as teachers are entrusted with the transmission to learners of society's beliefs, attitudes, and deontology, as well as of information, advice, and wisdom, and with facilitating learners' acquisition of the key knowledge, attitudes, and behaviors that they will need to be active in society and the economy.

Generally, Teacher Education curricula can be broken down into four major areas:

- Domain knowledge in education-related aspects of philosophy of education, history of education, educational psychology, and sociology of education.
- Skills in assessing student learning, supporting English Language learners, using technology to improve teaching and learning, and supporting students with special needs.
- Content-area and methods knowledge and skills—often also including ways of teaching and assessing a specific subject, in which case this area may overlap with the first ("foundational") area. There is increasing debate about this aspect because it is no longer possible to know in advance what kinds of knowledge and skills pupils will need when they enter adult life. It becomes harder to know what kinds of knowledge and skills teachers should have. Increasingly, emphasis is placed upon transversal or horizontal skills (such as "learning to learn" or "social competences"), which cut across traditional subject boundaries, and therefore call into question traditional ways of designing the Teacher Education curriculum (and traditional school curricula and ways of working in the classroom).
- Practice at classroom teaching or at some other form of educational practice—usually supervised and supported in some way, though not always. Practice can take the form of field observations, student teaching, or (U.S.) internship (See Supervised Field Experiences below). This area also includes extracurricular competences such as dealing with conflicts and bullying among pupils.

Teacher preparation is important for helping future educators to develop the knowledge and skills needed to teach students from different backgrounds and learning environments. The National Academy of Education (2024) emphasized that "highly qualified teachers prepared to teach a diverse student body" are essential to well-functioning public education. Evaluating teacher preparation programs can help identify areas of improvement and ensure that future teachers receive the training and support needed to meet students educational needs.

==== Rural ====
Those training to teach in rural and remote areas face different challenges from those who teach in urban centers. Therefore, a different approach to teacher education is needed for those who aspire to each in rural and remote areas. It has been proposed that rural and remote communities may have more success recruiting teachers who already live in these communities, rather than recruiting urbanites to move to rural areas after completing their teacher training. Online and blended teacher education programs are becoming more prevalent to help meet the needs of teacher shortages in rural and remote areas. In addition, the United Nations Sustainable Development Goal 4 aims to substantially increase the supply of qualified teachers by 2030 through international cooperation.

==== Supervised field experiences ====
Supervised field experiences may include:

- Field observations: Include observation and limited participation within a classroom under the supervision of the classroom teacher.
- Student teaching: Includes many weeks of teaching in an assigned classroom under the supervision of the classroom teacher and a supervisor (e.g., from the university).
- Internship: Teaching candidates are supervised within their own classroom.

These three areas reflect the organization of most teacher education programs in North America and in Asian countries such as Sri Lanka. Courses, modules, and other activities are often organized into one of the three major areas of teacher education. The organization makes the programs more rational or logical in structure. The conventional organization has sometimes also been criticized, however, as artificial and unrepresentative of how teachers actually experience their work. Problems of practice frequently (perhaps usually) concern foundational issues, curriculum, and practical knowledge simultaneously, and separating them in teacher education may therefore be unhelpful.

However, the question of necessary training components is highly debated, as continuing increases in attrition among new teachers and struggling learners are evident. Additionally, with the increasing demands of the "teacher," research is beginning to suggest that teachers must not only be trained to increase learning experiences for their students, but also to be leaders in an increasingly challenging field. The debate of how best to prepare teachers for teaching in today's demanding environments will continue to be an important focus of the United States, where the education of all children successfully is a priority.

=== Induction of beginning teachers ===
Teaching involves a wide body of knowledge about the subject being taught and another set of knowledge about the most effective ways to teach that subject to different kinds of learners; it therefore requires teachers to undertake a complex set of tasks every minute. Many teachers experience their first years in the profession as stressful. The proportion of teachers who either do not enter the profession after completing initial training or who leave the profession after their first teaching post is high.

A distinction is sometimes made between inducting a teacher into a new school (explaining the school's vision, procedures, etc.) and inducting a new teacher into the teaching profession (providing the support necessary to help the beginning teacher develop a professional identity and to develop further the basic competencies that were acquired in college).

Many countries and states have implemented comprehensive support systems to help beginning teachers during their first years in the profession. Elements of such a program can include:

- Mentoring: the allocation to each beginning teacher of an experienced teacher, specifically trained as a mentor; the mentor may provide emotional and professional support and guidance; in teacher training, induction is limited to the provision of a mentor, but research suggests that, in itself, it is not enough.
- A peer network: for mutual support but also for peer learning.
- Input from educational experts (e.g., to help the beginning teacher relate what she learned in college to classroom reality).
- Support for the process of self-reflection that all teachers engage in (e.g., through the keeping of a journal).

Some research suggests that such programs can increase the retention of beginning teachers in the profession, improve teaching performance, and promote teachers' personal and professional well-being.

However, numerous authors suggests that current teacher education is highly flawed and primarily geared towards a Western-dominated curriculum. Hence, they suggest that teacher education should be inclusive and take into account multiple backgrounds and variables to allow teachers to be responsive to the requirements of their students. This falls into the area of culturally responsive teaching and requires teaching education and teachers to address issues of diversity education and disadvantage as a part of a teacher education curriculum. Jabbar & Hardaker (2013) argue that this is an essential process in helping students of ethnicity, colour and diversity achieve and attain.

=== Continuous professional development ===
Because the world that teachers are preparing young people to enter is changing so rapidly, and because the teaching skills required are evolving likewise, no initial course of teacher education can be sufficient to prepare a teacher for a career of 30 or 40 years. In addition, as the student body continues to change due to demographic issues, there is ongoing pressure on academics to master their subjects and understand their students. Continuous professional development is the process by which teachers (like other professionals) reflect upon their competencies, keep them up to date, and develop them further.

The extent to which education authorities support this process varies, as does the effectiveness of the different approaches. A growing research base suggests that to be most effective, continuing professional development activities should:

- Be spread over time.
- Be collaborative.
- Use active learning.
- Be delivered to groups of teachers.
- Include periods of practice, coaching, and follow-up.
- Promote reflective practice.
- Encourage experimentation.
- Respond to teachers' needs.

However, a systematic review published in 2019 by the Campbell Collaboration, which summarizes evidence from 51 studies, finds no clear evidence that continuing professional development in education improves students' academic outcomes.

== Quality assurance in teacher education ==
The concept of 'quality' in education is contested and understood in numerous different ways.

Ensuring the quality of teacher education includes selecting competent recruits for teacher education programs, accrediting programs that consistently demonstrate positive outcomes, and offering registration, licensing, or certification to those who demonstrate competence to enter the teaching profession. The importance of official checks "on the ability of teachers and the excellence of their training" has been associated with the rights of parents to choose how their children are educated.

It is sometimes taken to refer to the quality of a teacher's work, which has significant effects on their pupils or students. Further, those who pay teachers' salaries, whether through taxes or through school fees, wish to be assured that they are receiving value for money. Ways to measure the quality of work of individual teachers, of schools, or of education systems as a whole are therefore often sought.

In most countries, a teacher's salary is not related to the perceived quality of their work. Some, however, have systems to identify the 'best-performing' teachers and increase their remuneration accordingly. Elsewhere, assessments of teacher performance may be undertaken to identify teachers' needs for additional training or development, or, in extreme cases, to identify those who should be required to leave the profession. In some countries, teachers are required to reapply periodically for their teaching license and, in so doing, to demonstrate that they still have the requisite skills. But still, there are countries (e.g., Sri Lanka) where teaching cannot be considered as a profession, as the teachers are not provided with a license to teach.

Feedback on the performance of teachers is integral to many state and private education procedures, but takes many different forms. Some believe the 'no fault' approach to be satisfactory, as weaknesses are carefully identified, assessed, and then addressed through the provision of in-house or school-based training. These can, however, be seen as benefiting the institution and not necessarily fully meeting the continuing professional development needs of the individual, as they lack educational gravitas.

=== Professional knowledge and competences of teacher educators ===
Being able to educate teachers requires different knowledge and skills from those required to teach pupils or students.

==== Teacher educators' fields of knowledge ====
Some recent research has highlighted the many fields of knowledge required of teacher educators; these include knowledge of the pedagogy of teacher education, learning and learners, teaching and coaching, and the teacher educator's profession. In addition, teacher educators need to know about the specific contexts in which their students will work (e.g., primary or secondary education) and the subjects they will teach. More experienced teacher educators need expertise in: curriculum development and assessment; the wider context of teacher education, including how it is organized; and research.

==== Multiple identities ====
The complexity of a teacher educator's tasks arises in part because, as research has shown, they have multiple professional identities. (This is linked to the issues of the definition of the term, highlighted above. While some of those who carry responsibility for the education of teachers do self-identify as 'teacher educator', others may self-identify rather as 'researcher' or 'academic'; others may relate primarily to their academic discipline, such as 'chemist' or 'geographer.'

But the key duality of identity that lies at the core of the teacher educator profession is that of first-order and second-order teaching. A teacher educator must be a highly competent 'first-order educator' (i.e., a good teacher) but also a skilled 'second-order educator' (i.e., capable of teaching effectively about the skill of teaching and facilitating others to acquire teaching skills). As first-order educators, they need to be proficient teachers (of 'adult' students). As second-order educators, they also require specific competences and dispositions, such as modeling and meta-reflection, that enable them to teach about teaching.

The acquisition or improvement of teacher competencies requires training, through which educational planning and assessment will be improved. This results in better learning for students, as evidence shows. It is the objective of FAMT & L Comenius project, conducted at the University of Bologna, designed to promote the correct use of formative assessment in mathematics education for students aged from 11 to 16. Reaching this goal entails designing training programs for mathematics teachers, starting with identifying their needs, beliefs, expectations, and the use of formative assessment.

===== Modelling =====
The way teacher educators teach has a greater impact on student teachers' thinking about practice than what they teach. So, teacher educators need to be able to model the competences and attributes they wish their students to adopt. Swennen et al. (2008). concluded that, to 'model' what they teach, teacher educators need to develop the ability to link their own (tacit) theories and practice of teaching to public theory, i.e., in Korthagen's words, to translate Theory with a capital 'T' to theory with a small 't'.

===== Meta-reflection =====
Just as teaching is no longer seen as simply transferring factual information, so educating teachers also requires a more sophisticated approach, based upon professional awareness that comes from reflective practice. For Loughran, being a professional teacher educator requires "genuinely reflecting on, and responding to, the needs, demands, and expectations of teaching about teaching within the academy".

=== Professional standards for teacher educators ===
In some parts of the world (notably the United States, Flanders, and the Netherlands), specific standards of professional practice have been developed for or by teacher educators. These set out the range of competences that a member of the teacher educator profession is expected to deploy, as well as the attitudes, values, and behaviors deemed acceptable for membership in the profession.

== Teacher educators ==
Teacher educator
Occupation
- Names: Teacher educator, teacher trainer
- Occupation type: Profession
- Activity sectors: Education

Description
- Competencies: Teaching, teaching about teaching, research into learning and teaching,
- Education required: varies
- Fields of employment: University, teacher-training college, college of education, school
- Related jobs: Professor, academic, lecturer, tutor, teacher

A teacher educator (also called a teacher trainer) is a person who helps in-service and pre-service teachers acquire the knowledge, competencies, and attitudes they require to be effective teachers. Several individual teacher educators are usually involved in the initial or ongoing education of each teacher; often each specialises in teaching about a different aspect of teaching (e.g., educational ethics, philosophy of education, sociology of education, curriculum, pedagogy, subject-specific teaching methods etc.).

Not every culture has a concept that precisely matches the English term 'teacher educator'... Even where the concept exists, the range of roles that is covered by the term varies significantly from country to country. In some traditions, the term 'teacher trainer' may be used instead of 'teacher educator'.

A teacher educator may be narrowly defined as a higher education professional whose principal activity is preparing new teachers in universities and other institutions of teacher education, such as National Colleges of Education, Teacher Training Colleges, and Teacher Centers. A broader definition might include any professional whose work contributes in some way to the initial education or the continuing professional development of school and other teachers.

Even within a single educational system, teacher educators may be employed in different roles by different kinds of organizations. In the European context, for example, people who could be considered to be teacher educators include:

- Higher education academics with a responsibility
  - for teacher education as such,
  - for teaching a subject (such as chemistry or mathematics) to students who will later become teachers;
  - for research into teaching,
  - for subject studies or
  - for didactics;
- teachers in schools who supervise student teachers during periods of teaching practice;
- school teachers or school managers responsible for inducting new teachers during their first year of teaching; or
- those in charge of school teaching staff's continuous professional development.

Teacher educators may therefore work in many different contexts including National Colleges of Education, teacher training colleges, teacher centers (universities, schools, private sector training organisations or trade unions), and their working time may be fully, or only partly, dedicated to the preparation of teachers.

== Policy and legislation on the teacher educator profession ==
The process by which teachers are educated is the subject of political discussion in many countries, reflecting both the value societies and cultures attach to preparing young people for life and the fact that education systems consume significant financial resources. Political bias in education can be evaluated through opinion polls.

However, the degree of political control over Teacher Education varies. Where teacher education is entirely in the hands of universities, the state may have no direct control whatever over what or how new teachers are taught; this can lead to anomalies, such as teachers being taught using teaching methods that would be deemed inappropriate if they used the same methods in schools, or teachers being taught by persons with little or no hands-on experience of teaching in real classrooms. In other systems, teacher education may be the subject of detailed prescription (e.g., the state may specify the skills that all teachers must possess or the content of teacher education courses).

Policy cooperation in the European Union has led to a broad description of the kinds of attributes that teachers in European Union member states should possess: the Common European Principle for Teacher Competences and Qualifications.

While schools and school teachers are often in the news and in political debate, research shows that the teacher educator profession is largely absent from such public discussions and from policy discourse in education which often focuses exclusively on teachers and school leaders.

Some research suggests that while most countries have policies and legislation in place concerning the teaching profession, few have a clear policy or strategy for the teacher educator profession. Caena (2012) found that some of the consequences of this situation can include a teacher educator profession that is poorly organised, has low status or low formal recognition, has few regulations, professional standards – or even minimum qualifications, and no coherent approach to the selection, induction, or continuing professional development of Teacher Educators.

In India, the National Council of Teacher Education (NCTE) released the 'National Curriculum Framework for Teacher Education, 2010 (NCFTE), which aims to remedy many of the ills of teacher training in India. It calls for preparing a 'humane and reflective practitioner' and for fostering the agency and autonomy of the teacher, who can interpret the curriculum meaningfully in light of the contextual needs of the learners, rather than merely focusing on 'teaching the text book'.

== Research into the teacher educator profession ==
The teacher educator profession has also been seen as under-researched; empirical research on professional practice is also scarce.

However, the importance of the quality of this profession for the quality of teaching and learning has been underlined by international bodies including the OECD and the European Commission.

Some writers have therefore identified a need for more research into "what teachers of teachers themselves need to know", and what institutional supports are needed to "meet the complex demands of preparing teachers for the 21st century".

In response to this perceived need, more research projects are now focusing on the teacher educator profession. Several academic journals cover this field.

== By region ==
The Erasmus Programme and its platform, the SchoolEducationGateway, provide an opportunity for European Union teachers to participate in international training courses across different European countries. It is fully funded by the KA1 (KeyAction1).

== See also ==
- Discrimination in education
- Gender mainstreaming in teacher education policy
- Pedagogical pattern
- Pedagogical Content Knowledge
- Pedagogy
- Pedeutology
- ResearchED
- School of education
- Teaching method
- History of education
