= Great Mission =

Great Mission may refer to:

- Great Mission Teacher Training Institute, Delhi
- Great Mission Public School, group of co-educational schools run by Prabhas Educational and Welfare Society in New Delhi, India
- Run for Money: The Great Mission, Japanese animated series
- "Great Mission", song from You Gotta Say Yes to Another Excess
