= Teacher Eligibility Test =

Educational qualification in India

The Teacher Eligibility Test, known as TET, is the minimum qualification required in India for a person to be eligible for an appointment as a teacher for Classes I to VIII. The test is mandatory for teaching jobs in Indian government schools. Similarly, UP Government introduced another qualifying after UPTET called Super TET. The 24111143967 is conducted by both the central and state governments of India. Most states conduct their own TET. The test is conducted to meet the objectives of the Right of Children to Free and Compulsory Education Act, 2009. The TET certificate is valid for lifetime.

== History ==
The Teacher Eligibility Test (TET) was introduced by the Government of India in 2011 to improve standards in teaching. Teachers already working were expected to pass the exam within two years.

== The Test ==
The exam is based on the Government of India's National Curriculum Framework for Teacher Education, and is a mandatory qualification for incoming teachers for Classes I through VIII. People with professional teaching qualifications, including the B.T.C (D.El.Ed), B.Ed, and B.El.Ed, are eligible to take the test. Candidates must score over 60% to pass.

The Central Board of Secondary Education (CBSE) maintains the TET database and guides government bodies on conducting the test.

== Central Teacher Eligibility Test ==
The Central Teacher Eligibility Test (CTET) was established when, in accordance with the provisions of sub-section (1) of Section 23 of the RTE Act, the National Council for Teacher Education (NCTE) received notifications dated 23 August 2010 and 29 July 2011 stipulating minimum qualifications for eligibility to teach Classes I to VIII. Passing the TET, conducted in accordance with NCTE Guidelines, is an essential requirement for appointment as a teacher in any of the schools referred to in clause (n) of section 2 of the Right of Children to Free and Compulsory Education Act (RTE Act). Teachers Adda Result 2022

The national Ministry of Human Resource Development entrusted responsibility for conducting the Central Teacher Eligibility Test (CTET) to the CBSE, Delhi, which conducts the CTET twice a year. The CTET is held in 20 Indian languages. Approximately 14 lakh candidates apply to sit the examination. The thirteenth edition of CTET was held on 8 December 2019 in 110 Indian cities.

There are two papers: Paper 1, for teachers of Classes I to V, and Paper 2 for Classes VI to VIII. Candidates must score a minimum of 60% to become CTET Qualified, and the certificate is valid for lifetime. Successful candidates become eligible to apply for recruitment as teachers of Classes I to VIII in schools under the purview of the Central Government (KVS, NVS, Central Tibetan Schools, etc.), and schools under the administrative control of the union territories (UTs) of Chandigarh, Dadra and Nagar Haveli, Daman and Diu and Andaman and Nicobar Islands, Lakshadweep, and the National Capital Territory of Delhi (NCT). The examination is demanding, with qualification rates of 1-14% in the exams held to date.

The TET was made a necessary prerequisite for appointment as a teacher to meet the following objectives:

- To establish a national benchmark and standards for teacher quality and recruitment
- To encourage further improvement in the performance standards of teacher education institutions and their students
- To communicate the Government's particular focus on teacher quality

== Statewise TET ==
=== Andhra Pradesh & Telangana ===
TET weighting in the District Selection Committee (DSC) teacher selection entrance examination is 20%.

Some 4 lakh candidates sat for the 2012 test. In February 2019, thousands of candidates sat the Andhra Pradesh TET examination, which was held in several test centers.

=== Uttar Pradesh ===
The Uttar Pradesh Basic Education Board (UPBEB) holds its TET examinations Uttar Pradesh teacher Eligibility Test (UPTET) once a year to select primary and junior teachers. The UPTET written exam comprises two papers:

- Paper I: for primary level teachers
- Paper II: for junior level teachers

Candidates may sit either or both papers.

In 2021, UPBEB conducted the UPTET 2021 exam in two shifts across 75 districts of Uttar Pradesh on November 28, 2021. but later exam got cancelled due to paper leakage. The re-examination was held on 23 January 2022 and the results were declared on 9 April 2022.

In 2016, the UPTET written examination was held on 19 December, in two shifts.

In 2017, UPBEB published its examination notification on 22 August, and the written exam was conducted on 15 October.

In 2018, the UPBEB notification was scheduled for publication on 15 September, with applications beginning on 17 September for the written examination on 28 October.

=== Bihar ===
Bihar STET (Secondary Teacher Eligibility Test) is an exam which is a mandatory exam for candidates who wish to become secondary level (class 9th to 12th) teachers in the state of Bihar. This exam is conducted by the Bihar School Examination Board (BSEB). Candidates who pass the STET exam get the right to apply for the recruitment of teachers in government schools of Bihar.

=== Rajasthan ===
The Rajasthan Board of Secondary Education (RBSE) organizes the Rajasthan Teacher Eligibility Test (REET) for teachers in Rajasthan state.

Teacher Eligibility Tests are conducted twice a year, for two levels, Level 1 and Level 2.

Candidates have 2 hours and 30 minutes in which to answer 150 questions. The Level 1 examination paper is divided into five parts. The Level 2 examination paper comprises four parts, of which parts 1-3 are mandatory.

The validity of this paper has been made lifetime from 2022.

There is no negative marking in this paper. This paper is only eligibility test for third grade teacher.

After this paper, there is a separate mains paper to become a third grade teacher.

=== Haryana ===
The Haryana Teacher Eligibility Test (HTET) is conducted by the Board of School Education Haryana (BSEH) from time to time, for the following categories of school teachers: Primary (PRT), Trained Graduate Teacher (TGT), and Post Graduate Teacher (PGT).

Until 2009, the examination was known as the State Teacher Eligibility Test (STET). In 2011, under the RTE Act, 2009, and pursuant to issuance of notification by the NCTE, it was renamed the HTET.

The examination comprises three categories:

- Level I: for teaching Classes I to V (PRT)
- Level II: for teaching Classes VI to VIII (TGT)
- Level III: for post graduate teaching (PGT)

The HTET qualifying certificate is valid for a period of seven years from the date of passing the examination. There is no restriction on the number of times a candidate may attempt the test, and candidates who have already obtained the HTET/STET qualification may resit the test in order to improve their score.

=== Punjab ===
The Department of School Education, Punjab is responsible for conducting the Punjab State Teacher Eligibility Test, or PSTET, examination. The PSTET is conducted as two different papers for candidates wishing to join the Punjab School Education Board as teachers:

- Paper I: for recruitment of teachers from Classes I to V
- Paper II: for recruitment of teachers from Classes VI to VIII

Eligible candidates apply to sit the PSTET through the official Punjab School Education Board website.

=== Maharashtra ===
The Maharashtra TET (MAHATET) is a state-level teacher eligibility test (TET) conducted by Maharashtra State Council of Examination every year. The MAHA TET is conducted at two levels – primary (paper-I) for teacher of class 1st to 5th and upper primary (paper-II) for teacher of class 6th to 8th. MAHA TET or Maharashtra TET (Teachers Eligibility Test) conducted by the Maharashtra State Council of Examination (MSCE) to determine the eligibility of candidates for Classes 1 to 8 teachers in the schools of Maharashtra. The MAHA TET exam is conducted at two levels – the primary (paper 1) and upper primary (paper 2). Candidates who plan to become teachers of Classes 1-5 need to appear for the MAHA TET paper 1. On the other hand, candidates who plan to be teachers of Classes 6-8 need to appear for MAHA TET paper 2. Candidates who wish to be teachers of Classes 1-8, need to appear for both papers 1 and Paper 2.

=== Himachal Pradesh ===
The Himachal Pradesh Board of School Education (HPBoSE) conducts the Himachal Pradesh Teacher Eligibility Test (HPTET) to determine the eligibility of candidates for teaching posts in government and private schools of the state. The examination is usually conducted twice a year across various centres in Himachal Pradesh.

The HPTET is held for different categories of teachers, including:

- JBT (Junior Basic Training) for primary teachers (Classes I–V)
- TGT (Trained Graduate Teacher) in Arts, Medical, and Non-Medical for upper primary (Classes VI–VIII)
- Language Teacher (LT)
- Shastri
- Punjabi and Urdu teachers

Each paper is of 150 marks with a duration of 150 minutes. Candidates must score at least 60% marks to qualify the test. The HPTET certificate is valid for a lifetime as per the latest guidelines, and there is no limit on the number of attempts a candidate may take.

In 2024, more than one lakh candidates appeared for the HPTET examination conducted in offline mode at multiple test centres across the state.
