= Gender mainstreaming in teacher education policy =

Gender mainstreaming in teacher education policy refers to efforts to examine and change processes of policy formulation and implementation across all areas and at all levels from a gender perspective so as to address and correct existing and emerging disparities between men and women. It is a strategy to change the process of policy design, implementation and evaluation by taking into consideration the gender specific and often diverse needs, priorities, interests and values of differently positioned men and women. In this context, gender mainstreaming is about awareness of the existence of gender disparities and their causes and implications, and ensures that they are addressed at each phase of the policy cycle or policy analyses and revision.

== Context and process ==
There are two situations in which Teacher Education Institutes (TEIs) can find themselves. One is that they may not have a policy at all, and the other is that they might have a policy but that the policy may not have addressed gender issues or mainstreamed gender. In the first instance, TEIs need to develop a gender-responsive policy for their institutions, and in the second they need to review their policy from gender perspectives. In this part of the module we will look at mainstreaming gender in the different phases of the policy cycle: Problem Definition, Agenda Setting, Policy Formulation, Policy Legitimation and Policy Evaluation.

=== Problem definition ===
Share of women in the teaching force, by region, income group and education level, 2017

Problem definition explains the nature, scope and significance of the problem within the context of the current policy environment (international, regional and national legal and policy commitments). During this stage, a problem is identified and examined, and possible solutions are explored through research and discussion. It requires that the delineation of the policy problem is as clear as possible in order to help identify problems of teacher education, as well as gender issues that are relevant at the national level and that can be addressed by formulating policy in their applicable institutions. Whatever the problem identified, the TEI must be seen from the perspective of gender equality. In order to do this, the first step is to investigate gender disparities in different areas and levels among students, teaching staff and administration. In this regard, some of the following areas are analyzed:

- Number of male and female teaching staff
- Number of male and female teaching staff by qualification
- Number of male and female staff holding key administrative positions
- Number of male and female trainees
- Number of male and female trainees by academic performance

=== Agenda setting ===
Once a problem is identified, a decision has to be reached as to whether it requires a policy intervention. If so, efforts will be made to bring the matter and its possible solutions to the attention of relevant staff and decision-makers to make it a policy-requiring issue. Already existing policies, strategies, programmes or offices may address some of the problems. The institute may need to review the policies, programmes or office structures, and also introduce a gender equality perspective to strengthen them further and address the problems more effectively. If there are gender-responsive policies available, TEIs may need to come up with a more concrete implementation plan, while other problems may require a policy initiative. In such a situation, the problem could be presented as a policy agenda to the relevant authority for consideration.

=== Defining goals and outputs ===
After defining the problem, and once the problem is considered as requiring policy intervention, goals are identified in order to address the problem. In the context of TEIs, the goals could range from increasing enrolment, addressing quality, acquiring resources, and mitigating high staff turnover to narrowing gender disparities. Policy goals need to state gender concerns specifically and visibly. Different performance indicators and sex-disaggregated data need to be considered to capture the gender dimensions. The stated goals need to take into consideration the different gender related barriers women and men face to benefit equally and equitably.

=== Policy formulation ===
Policy formulation has two basic stages: determining the policy options and selecting the preferred option. This process may involve debate over alternative policy choices, which takes into account both the benefits and costs of each policy option. The policy alternatives are derived from a research process that investigates the problem in an in-depth manner using either primary or secondary sources of data or both. In collecting information all data, all relevant individuals and organizations have to be consulted, and all numerical data have to be disaggregated by sex. This stage may also entail analysis of existing policies. Based on the information gathered, the preferred policy options are presented, which will enable the policy objective to be effectively and efficiently reached.

=== Policy legitimation ===
For a policy to obtain a legal status, it has to be approved as an official policy document by relevant authorities in the TEI, as well as the ministry or relevant divisions within the ministry, depending on the structures and the practices of that specific country. This is an important step as it gives the policy legitimacy. Once it is approved, a policy also serves as an advocacy instrument, as well as a document that could be used to raise funds.

=== Policy implementation ===
Implementation refers to the actual practical activities that need to be carried out to realize the policy goals and objectives. A number of critical decisions are made at this stage: decisions about regulations, structures, budget and partnerships, all of which are necessary to implement the policy. Policy implementation requires a commitment. As observed from experience, many countries and organizations have very good policy instruments, but most of the time they remain on paper. After going through the process of policy development, which is very resource intensive, its implementation requires serious consideration. The first inquiry should determine the changes needed to implement the policy.

=== Policy evaluation ===
Evaluation is monitoring and assessing the process and impact of policy implementation. Policy research and analysis are used as strategies to evaluate whether the policy goals were reached, and if there were any unanticipated positive or negative outcomes. The evaluation process also attempts to see the various types of impacts: direct versus indirect, and short term versus long term. The information gathered from the evaluation will be used as inputs in the next policy cycle or process. Policy monitoring and evaluation is usually a challenging step as it requires consistent follow up, information collection, and efforts to compare policy goals with the outcome of activities carried out to implement the policy. The policy goals serve as a framework for any instrument that is designed to collect and compile information for the evaluation. The instruments that are designed should ensure that gender is included as a category of analysis and that issues concerning both men and women are included in the questions. Specific women's issues, as identified in the policy problem, should be covered, and during the data collection process both men and women should be included as sources of data. In the context of TEIs the data to be gathered on enrolment, performance and achievement, in-service training, promotion, leadership and administration are to be disaggregated by sex.

== See also ==
- Bias in curricula
- Gender inequality in curricula
- Education sector responses to LGBT violence

== Sources ==
This article incorporates text from a free content work. Licensed under CC-BY-SA IGO 3.0 (license statement/permission). Text taken from A Guide for Gender Equality in Teacher Education Policy and Practices, 32-34, UNESCO, UNESCO. UNESCO.
