= School-related gender-based violence in Vietnam =

School-related gender-based violence in Viet Nam refers to physical, sexual, psychosocial and verbal violence that takes place in the Vietnamese education system. Different forms of School-related gender-based violence (SRGBV) interact and overlap. Bullying, for instance, occurs when there is an imbalance of power between the “bully” and the “bullied” and can happen through physical contact, verbal attacks, social exclusion, and psychological manipulation. Students are bullied when they are repeatedly and intentionally exposed to harmful and/or aggressive behaviour that results in injury or discomfort.

== Scale ==
Global, regional and local research demonstrates that schools and other educational institutions in Viet Nam are not always safe and inclusive spaces for children and young people. Many schools are sites of physical, verbal, psychosocial and sexual violence. This violence appears to be on the rise with incidents reported to the Department of Child Care and Protection hotline increasing by a factor of 13 in the last decade. Research in two schools of Hai Phong City showed that nearly 57% of the students surveyed had been bullied. Further, a field survey carried out by the Centre for Creative Initiatives in Health and Population (CCIHP) with 520 lesbian, gay, bisexual, and transgender (LGBT) at the average age of 21 has shown that 41% suffered from discrimination and violence in either general education schools or universities. This violence can negatively impact the wellbeing and education performance of children and young people. In the long-term such violence may adversely affect employment prospects and the economic development of the country.

== Studies ==
In 2013 the Global School-based Health Survey (GSHS) showed that approximately one in six students, aged 13–17 years, reported being in a physical fight one or more times during the last 12 months, with this behaviour being more common for boys (26%) than girls (10%). Reported experiences of bullying, one or more days within the last 30 days, were however similar for boys and girls (23% and 24% respectively). Other small scale studies have confirmed that (i) school violence is common; (ii) forms of violence among students include physical, psychological, sexual and social violence as well as bullying; and (iii) students with diverse sexual orientation and gender identity or expression are also reported to be targeted for violence.

Viet Nam has also had some research studies about violence against LGBT students, including a field survey carried out by CCIHP with 520 LGBT people with the average age of 21. This study revealed that 41% of LGBT participants suffered from discrimination and violence in either schools or universities. Save the Children Vietnam and the Institute of Social and Medical Studies completed a separate study on 170 LGBT young adults which found that discrimination against these children (at home and school) contributed to their increased risk of homelessness. They were at high risk of violence at home, school and on the streets. Only 15.9% of the LGBT youth participants had a post-secondary school education, 47.8% had only a lower secondary education, 27.6% had only a primary school education, and 8.7% had no schooling at all.

One study conducted by the Institute for Studies of Society, Economy and Environment (iSEE) involving 2,363 respondents from 63 provinces in Viet Nam found that one in three respondents felt that they had been subject to discrimination because of their sexual orientation and gender identity within 12 months preceding the survey, with a high degree of frequency. The study also reported that transgender people experience the highest degree of discrimination. This study focused its analysis on the discrimination experienced by LGBT people in families, schools, workplaces, healthcare settings and housing, among other aspects. Looking specifically at the school setting, the study found that nearly a quarter of students had been harassed, bullied by teachers and/or school officials because they were considered to be LGBT. Gender indicative uniforms proved to be a significant obstacle for transgender people, affecting their quality of learning and their mental health. In light of the findings, some recommendations specific to the education sector included: 1) School psychological counseling models need to pre-empt the psychological and physical development of students to provide well-timed educational support; 2) Create extracurricular programs that respond to the needs of students; 3) Respect students’ choice of uniform to fit with their desired gender and; 4) Educate faculties about the LGBT community. One study conducted by the Institute for Studies of Society, Economy and Environment (iSEE) involving 2,363 respondents from 63 provinces in Viet Nam found that one in three respondents felt that they had been subject to discrimination because of their sexual orientation and gender identity within 12 months preceding the survey, with a high degree of frequency.106 The study also reported that transgender people experience the highest degree of discrimination. This study focused its analysis on the discrimination experienced by LGBT people in families, schools, workplaces, healthcare settings and housing, among other aspects. Looking specifically at the school setting, the study found that nearly a quarter of students had been harassed, bullied by teachers and/or school officials because they were considered to be LGBT. Gender indicative uniforms proved to be a significant obstacle for transgender people, affecting their quality of learning and their mental health. In light of the findings, some recommendations specific to the education sector included: 1) School psychological counselling models need to preempt the psychological and physical development of students to provide well-timed educational support; 2) Create extracurricular programs that respond to the needs of students; 3) Respect students’ choice of uniform to fit with their desired gender and; 4) Educate faculties about the LGBT community.

Plan International Viet Nam, in cooperation with the Ha Noi Department of Education and Training (DOET), Center for Research and Applied Sciences in Gender, Family, Women and Adolescents (CSAGA), and the International Centre for Research on Women (ICRW), has implemented a “Gender Responsive School Pilot Model project” meant to prevent and respond to SRGBV. The 3-year project (2014-2016), funded by UNTF and Plan International involves 20 secondary/high schools in Ha Noi. The intervention provides teacher training on gender equality, SRGBV, and reproductive health to encourage lessons on related topics to be integrated into the curriculum. The intervention also encourages the formation of youth leadership organizations and awareness-raising activities with parents. A key component of the project is the establishment of a psychological counselling room at the participating schools. To date, nearly 2,300 students have received individualized counselling and over 4,100 students have received group counselling. The project has found that while only 6% of students in Viet Nam know about a public hotline for counselling, 21% of the total students in the 20 schools of the project have sought counselling services.

== Prevention ==
The National Policy Framework for Gender Equality was approved for the period 2011–2020 with the goal of highlighting the importance of gender equality for the socio-economic development of the country, including in education efforts towards this end. Furthermore, unlike many of its neighbours, Viet Nam now no longer has a ban on same-sex marriage, and has indeed never had punitive laws around either male or female same-sex relations. Additionally, Viet Nam passed a landmark law by a vote of 282–84 in 2015 enshrining transgender people's right to legal recognition of a gender identity other than that indicated by their sex rights for transgender people and paving the way to allow those who have undergone gender reassignment to register their legal identity under their new sex. Along with these strategies, a National Targeted Program on Gender Equality was developed for the period of 2011 to 2015 and as Viet Nam moves forward with new strategies to achieve the Sustainable Development Goals, there is a clear opportunity for evaluation and reflection on current conditions around SOGIE in education.

== Sources ==
This article incorporates text from a free content work. Licensed under CC-BY-SA IGO 3.0 (license statement/permission). Text taken from Reaching Out: Preventing and Addressing SOGIE-related School Violence in Viet Nam, volume 2, 15, 21, 27-28, UNESCO, UNESCO. UNESCO.
