= Sexual harassment in education =

Specific kind of sexual harassment

Sexual harassment in education is an unwelcome behavior of a sexual nature that interferes with a student's ability to learn, study, work or participate in school activities. Sexual harassment encompasses a range of behavior from mild annoyances to sexual assault and rape. As committed by teachers, it is often framed as "sex for grades" and has attracted media attention throughout the world, partly in connection with the #MeToo movement.

== United States ==
In their 2000 survey on 2064 students in 8th through 11th grade, the American Association of University Women (AAUW) reported:

- 81% or eight out of 10 students experience sexual harassment in school
- 83% of girls have been sexually harassed
- 78% of boys have been sexually harassed
- 38% of the students were harassed by teachers or school employees
- 36% of school employees or teachers were harassed by students
- 42% of school employees or teachers had been harassed by each other

In their recent study (AAUW 2006) on sexual harassment at colleges and universities, the AAUW claimed that while both men and women were targets of sexual harassment, "women are disproportionately negatively affected."

- 62% of female college students and 61% of male college students report having been sexually harassed at their university.
- 66% of college students know someone personally who was harassed.
- 10% or fewer of student sexual harassment victims attempt to report their experiences to a university employee.
- 35% or more of college students who experience sexual harassment do not tell anyone about their experiences.
- 80% of students who experienced sexual harassment report being harassed by another student or former student.
- 39% of students who experienced sexual harassment say the incident or incidents occurred in the dorm.
- 51% of male college students admit to sexually harassing someone in college, with 22% admitting to harassing someone often or occasionally.
- 31% of female college students admit to harassing someone in college.
- Over 70% of LGBT college students have experienced sexual harassment.

In the "Report Card on Gender Equity," the NCWGE that 30 percent of undergraduate students, and 40 percent of graduate students, have been sexually harassed. (NCWGE, 1997)

In the United States, sexual harassment is a form of discrimination under Title IX of the Education Amendments of 1972.

== United Kingdom ==
In November 2025, Bloomberg’s Katherine Griffith published an article informed by interviews with almost 50 people exposing that the University of Oxford had failed women over harassment concerns. The article described how at least seven women had left their academic studies at Oxford because of harassment, and others described suffering from post traumatic stress disorder. Other media publications followed, a number of men were named as perpetrators of sexual harassment, and their stories were linked with previous reports about sexual harassment (in particular, a 2021 investigation detailing how Oxford professors abused their positions with sexist and drunken conduct). These articles and reports sparked a conversation about predation at Oxford and the shortcoming of the University’s handling of these cases.

Miles Hewston

Miles Hewston is a prominent social psychologist who has advised the UK government and held the honorific title of Emeritus Fellow at New College. He was described by Bloomberg as “having touched, bullied, and made unwanted sexual advances to multiple female students and junior academics working under him during his 18 years at Oxford.” Hewstone would turn up at women’s homes unannounced and dropped his trousers in their presence, touched women inappropriately, made comments about having relationships with colleagues and students, and described himself as a “bad boy”. Five people said they left Oxford to get away from him. When women made complaints about him, the University offered little to no support.

When the University finally investigated Hewstone after a formal complaint was made, it kept its findings confidential. When Hewstone left Oxford in 2019, an international group of academics in psychology wrote to Oxford asking for information about his departure and whether it was appropriate to invite Hewstone to conferences or consider him for awards; the University did not share any relevant information.

Hewstone relinquished his emeritus titles at Oxford in November 2025 after Bloomberg’s article came out. He was still using his Oxford credentials as late as October 2025, using the Oxford brand to contact women. The University of Oxford has been accused by one of the victims as being “an enabler that makes it possible for repeat perpetrators to perpetrate.”

Soumitra Dutta

In August 2025, a five-month investigation by the University of Oxford into the Dean of the Saïd Business School, Soumitra Dutta, upheld three allegations that he sexually harassed a female academic. A junior academic had sought his help in restricting an Emeritus Professor’s access to the Business School who was accused of rape. Dutta then said to the woman: “I feel very attracted to you. Can something happen between us?”.

Dutta stepped down in September 2025, and in the public announcement of his departure, the University did not include any information about the investigation against him or his being found guilty of sexual harassment.

Staff expressed concerned at how the leadership of the School managed the case, writing: “We are being approached daily by members of our community —particularly female colleagues and students— who no longer feel safe or supported within the school.” The University of Oxford hired Dutta despite knowing he had been forced to resign as Dean of the business school at Cornell University in the US following a personal relationship with a junior employee.

Damien Howard

The Senior Chaplain at the Oxford University Catholic Chaplaincy, Damian Howard, was asked to step down in August 2025 after a student made a complaint of sexual abuse against him. Howard allegedly initiated sexual contact with the student on multiple occasions, often when the latter was under the influence of alcohol. Howard had urged the student to stay in the Chaplaincy accommodation. The student claimed he felt “trapped” by Howard, and that his involvement in his personal life was “oppressive.”

Andy Orchard

Andrew Orchard is Rawlinson and Bosworth Professor of Anglo-Saxon at the University of Oxford and a fellow of Pembroke College, Oxford. In 2021, Al Jazeera published their findings on Orchard’s “personal reputation as a sexual predator.” They found he had a history of sexually harassing students, and initiating sexual relationships with students, as well as intimidating and harassing students and colleagues. Orchard faced similar accusations from his time at the University of Toronto. Although, since 2021, he is not undertaking any teaching, he remains in his post at the University of Oxford having faced no sanction.

Peter Thomson

Peter Thompson was Sydney L. Mayer Associate Professor of American History and a fellow at St Cross College at the University of Oxford when, in 2021, Al Jazeera reported that he had made sexist comments, and was physically “over-familiar” with female students. He "agreed not to teach students or attend events after an investigation by the university upheld allegations of sexual harassment against him".

Tariq Ramadan

Tariq Ramadan was a Professor of contemporary Islamic studies at the Faculty of Theology and Religion at the University of Oxford, and a fellow at St Antony’s College. In November 2017, he took a leave of absence from Oxford to contest allegations of sexual misconduct and rape. He has been charged for raping five women and convicted of rape by a Swiss court.

== Germany ==
The Universität Bremen was the first university in Germany to establish, in 1992, a contact point for matters regarding sexual harassment. It is generally considered that the power difference between university students and professors, who determine grades and can offer or prolong employment positions for PhD students, results in a risk of harassment. According to a non-representative survey of 12,663 students in 2012, every fourth student reported some form of sexual harassment, and about ten percent of those cases involved harassment by teachers. Concerned students who do not want to report misbehaviour for fear of career repercussions are given advice as to how to handle the situation. For example, a doctoral student may be advised to add an external evaluator to assess their work or to request that they be assigned a different advisor.

In the mid-2010s, allegations of sexual harassment were raised against teachers in institutions of higher education in Hamburg, Düsseldorf and Munich.

== Indonesia ==
On 16 April 2026, 16 Faculty of Law students of the University of Indonesia were suspended pending investigation after messages containing explicit remarks about female peers circulated online and prompted public criticism.

== Ghana and Nigeria ==
BBC Africa Eye performed a year-long investigation into sexual harassment committed by university teachers in Ghana. Four academics were secretly filmed as part of the investigation. It involved undercover reporters posing as students at the University of Ghana and the University of Lagos. The resulting documentary was broadcast in October 2019, exposing the misconduct.

The African Feminist Initiative released a solidarity statement condemning the harassment in an institution that should offer a safe environment for learning.

Two academics were suspended from the University of Ghana for six months and four months, respectively, without salary. They were to undergo training about the university's sexual harassment and misconduct policy, to resume work only after a positive assessment, and to undergo an annual assessment for five years. Some have criticized the punishment as too lenient.

In 2020, Nigeria's Senate initiated the debate of a bill aiming to prevent the sexual harassment of university students.

== See also ==
- Sexual abuse in primary and secondary schools
- Child-on-child sexual abuse
- School-related gender-based violence
- Sexual bullying

== External links and further reading ==
- Hey, Shorty!: A Guide to Combating Sexual Harassment and Violence in Schools and on the Streets (2011)
- Crossing the Line (2011)
