= Sexual bullying =

Bullying associated with sexual activity or orientation

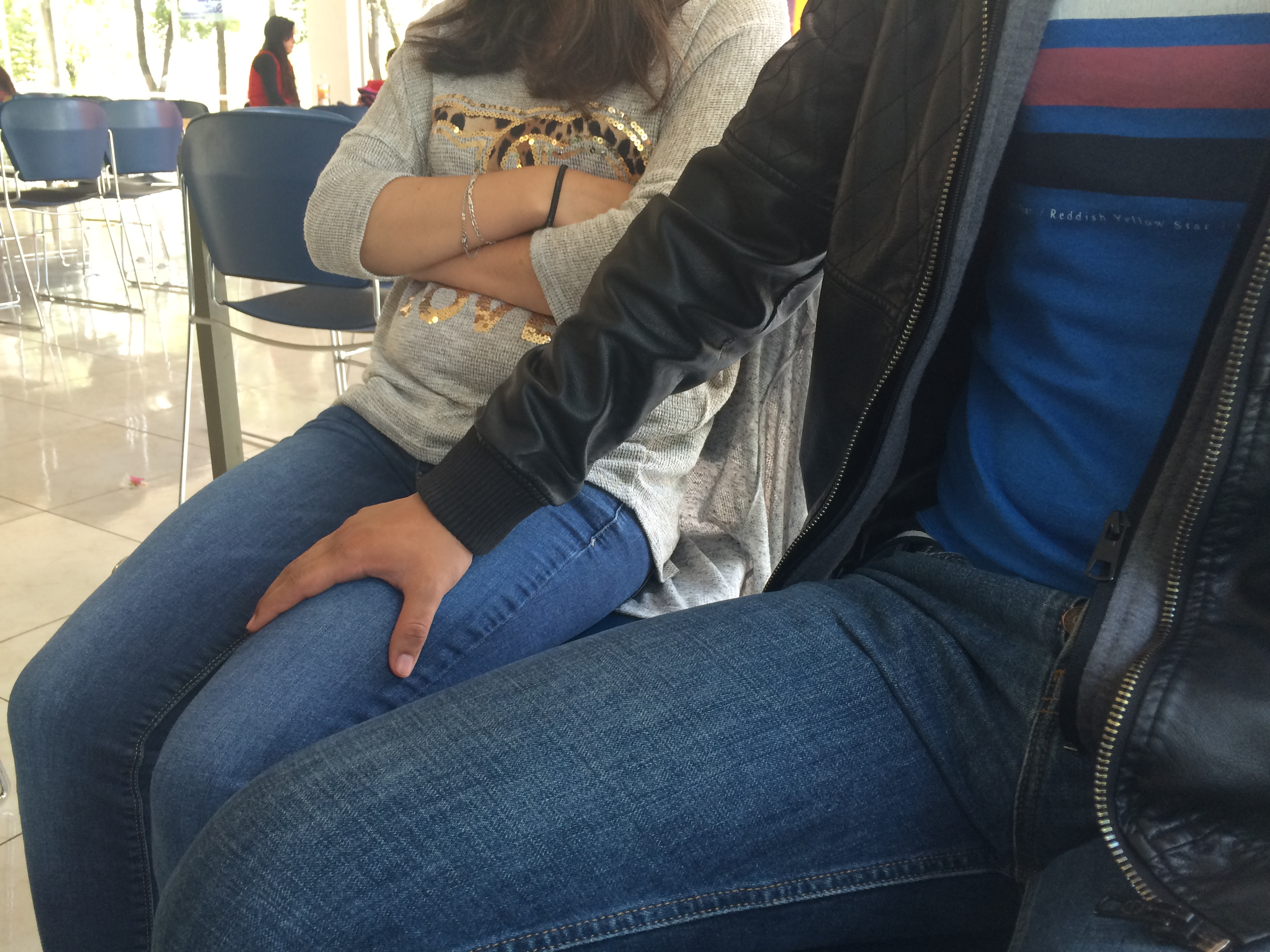
Sexual bullying can be physical, verbal and/or emotional.

Sexual bullying is bullying that involves aggression centered around a person’s body, sexuality, or sex that is typically observed among adolescents. It is a form of sexual harassment with the key difference being the intention of the perpetrator, a repetition of behavior, and a clear power imbalance between the bully and victim. Sexual harassment is defined as any unsolicited physical, verbal, or psychological behavior or attention and is illegal via the U.S. Equal Employment Opportunity Commission.

== Types of interactions ==
=== Physical and verbal bullying ===
Sexual bullying can involve sexually suggestive gestures, unconsented physical contact, sexual assault, or rape. Additionally, sexual bullying can occur with abusive and sexualized insults, spreading sexually related rumors, pressuring someone to do something sexual that is unconsented, sexism in all forms, unwanted sexual innuendos and upskirting.

The AAUW Educational Foundation 1993 journal Hostile Hallways provides a list of examples of sexual bullying in school, which includes making sexual comments about someone's body or appearance, teasing others for being or appearing to be LGBT, flashing, pulling others' clothes off, touching or brushing against another in a sexual manner, or spreading sexual rumors.

=== Sexual cyberbullying ===
Sexual cyberbullying is a form of cyberbullying that involves using technology, such as cell phones, social media, and other online tools, to harass or coerce someone in a sexually explicit manner.

This can include requesting explicit photos or messages, sending unwanted sexually explicit photos or messages, sharing sexually explicit messages and photos online without consent, threatening to send private photos online with the goal of receiving consensual sex, and publicly making unwanted sexually explicit comments.

== Case studies ==
=== Students ===
A study by the National Union of Teachers in the United Kingdom indicated that sexual bullying starts at the primary school level and usually takes the form of verbal insults by boys directed at girls and women. The insults are generally centered on girls' sexual status, and include terms such as 'bitch', 'slag', 'tart' and 'slut''.

Boys are mainly sexually bullied if they do not act in a way that conforms to a traditional view of masculinity.

=== LGBT ===
According to a 2016 UNESCO study, a significant proportion of LGBT students experience homophobic and transphobic violence in school globally. The proportion of LGBT students affected ranged from 16% in Nepal to 85% in the United States. LGBT students are also more likely to experience such violence at school than at home or in the community.

LGBT students report a higher prevalence of violence at school than their non-LGBT peers. In New Zealand, for example, lesbian, gay and bisexual students were three times more likely to be bullied than their heterosexual peers and in Norway 15–48% of lesbian, gay and bisexual students reported being bullied compared with 7% of heterosexual students.

=== Appearance ===
Research suggests that physical appearance plays a role in sexual bullying among youth. A 2010 study that observed sexual bullying in 5 European countries found that 85% of participants had experienced at least one form of sexual bullying victimization. The female adolescents experienced more sexual bullying victimization including sexual harassment, sexual assault, and being bullied for their appearance compared than their male counterparts.

Another study, using the Comprehensive Assessment of School Bullying (CASB), measured students’ self-perceived attractiveness and whether or not they were involved in sexual bullying by way of being a perpetrator, victim, observer, or if they had friends that were perpetrators of sexual bullying. 80% of female students and 66% of male students reported that they were average looking compared to their peers. Among those that self-reported as average looking, they were found to be both perpetrators and victims of sexual bullying, observers of sexual bullying, and having friends that commit sexual bullying all at a higher rate of those that reported being either above or below average attractiveness.

== Associated effects and risks ==
Victims of sexual bullying may struggle with depression, anxiety, isolation, low self-esteem, eating disorders, post-traumatic stress disorder (PTSD) and other mental health issues. In some cases, sexual bullying can lead to self-harm or even suicide.

The American Association of University Women identified behaviors of sexual bullying victims including negative-self talk via guilt or self-blaming, physically avoiding peers via changing their seat in class or staying home from school, feeling embarrassed or afraid, becoming unable to identify when unwanted sexual interactions are taking place, accepting sexually bullying as an unavoidable occurrence, and emotional withdrawal from romantic relationships.

Bullied sexual minority females are more likely to experience depression and suicidal ideation than their sexual minority male and heterosexual counterparts. Female victims of bullying and sexual harassment have also displayed significantly impacted physical health and symptoms of post-traumatic-stress disorder (PTSD).

Students that reported being bullied because of their sexuality reported having difficulty with sleep and intense feelings of loneliness. Additionally, those facing sexuality-based bullying can become perpetrators of sexual bullying by way of proving themselves to be heterosexual to their bullies and peers.

The Center for Victim research found a relationship between adolescent sexual violence and teen dating violence. Those that engage in sexual bullying as a young child are more likely to be perpetrators of teen dating violence and sexual harassment later in life.

The existence of sexual bullying amongst school children has been described as, "manifestations of sexual power struggles", as youth discover there are social benefits to being dominant and masculine. Both male and female students enact violence on their peers as a self-protective measure to avoid being seen as a weak, easy, feminine target.

== See also ==
- Sexual assault
- Sexual harassment
- Sexual misconduct
- Slut shaming
- Child sexual abuse
- Dating abuse
- Education sector responses to LGBT violence
- School bullying
- Sexual abuse
