= Great Mission Teacher Training Institute, Delhi =

Teacher training college in Dwarka, New Delhi, India

Great Mission Teacher Training Institute
- Type: Teacher Training Institute
- Established: 2006
- Location: (India) New Delhi, India
- Campus: Urban
- Website: gmtti.officialpage.info

Great Mission Teacher Training Institute (GMTTI) is a teacher training college in Dwarka, New Delhi, India.

== History ==
Great Mission Teacher Training Institute (GMTTI) was founded in 2006 by Prabhas Education & Welfare Society.

== Teacher education program ==
The institute offers full-time diploma programme in teacher education, which is recognized by the National Council for Teacher Education and affiliated with the State Council of Educational Research and Training, Delhi

== See also ==
- List of teacher education schools in India
