= District Selection Committee =

Indian entrance examination for recruitment of teachers

District Selection Committee, known as DSC, is an entrance examination by the state governments in India for recruitment of teachers.

== Eligibility ==
All the Bachelor of Education or B.Ed. graduates are eligible to take the test.

== Andhra Pradesh ==
The AP government takes 20% marks from Teachers Eligibility Test or TET. The government comes out with the notification for the vacant seats every year. and the state government gives 80% weight to DSC and 20% to TET.

In 1998, the government merged Panchayat Raj and government teacher cadres for uniform selection for all government-run schools.
