= Teacher Training College, Gaya =

College in Gaya, Bihar, India

- Type: Private
- Founder: Er. Awadhesh Kumar
- Affiliations: Magadh University
- Location: Gaya, Bihar, India
- Website: www.teachertrainingcollege.org

Teacher Training College, Gaya also known by TTC, Gaya is a unit of Buddha Group of Institutions, is a Bachelor of Education college situated in Gaya, Bihar, India. It was established in 2008. The college, approved by NCTE for M.Ed, B.Ed & D.El.Ed, and the University Grants Commission.

== Courses ==
- M.Ed
- B.Ed
- D.El.Ed

== See also ==
- List of teacher education schools in India
