= Sexual abuse in primary and secondary schools =

Form of child sexual abuse

Sexual abuse in primary and secondary schools is sexual abuse, often child sexual abuse, occurring in educational institutions from kindergarten through secondary education. Often the victims are minors below age of consent.

== Phenomenon ==
A 1993 study performed by the American Association of University Women examined seventy-nine state schools in the United States and found that 9.6% of students reported sexual abuse by teachers in the school setting.

The victims of school sexual abuse are often "vulnerable or marginal students".

== By country ==
=== France ===
In April 2015, education official Najat Vallaud-Belkacem admitted that "16 teachers were allowed to work in schools last year despite holding previous convictions for paedophilia." An international NGO claimed that "Thousands of children in French schools have been sexually abused by paedophile teachers". In the same year, twenty-seven staff members in primary and secondary schools were fired for sexual abuse.

In May 2026, the Paris prosecutor's office released a report detailing an investigation into more than 100 nurseries and primary schools across the city over allegations of physical and sexual abuse of children. The accusations primarily involved non‑teaching staff—such as caretakers and monitors—who were responsible for supervising children before and after school as well as during recess. According to the report, 78 staff members have been suspended. Separately, a man is currently on trial for the sexual assault of three girls and the harassment of nine others.

=== India ===
In March 2000, a cross-sectional study of students in the 11th grade of eight higher secondary schools in Goa found that "Coercive sex had been experienced by approximately 6% of adolescents." The pupils affected by this experienced higher rates of substance abuse, poorer academic performance, as well as poor mental and physical health.

=== United Kingdom ===
In The New York Times, Stephen Castle documented:

The very nature of boarding schools — closed environments in which teachers can wield enormous power — can make them attractive to child abusers. But in previous decades, parents were often reluctant to challenge teachers' authority, said Alan Collins, principal lawyer at Slater & Gordon, which represented the former Aldwickbury student. He has 30 to 40 more cases pending against schools across the country.

Since 2012, "425 people have been accused of carrying out sexual attacks at UK boarding schools".

=== United States ===
In the United States, "roughly 290,000 students experienced some sort of physical sexual abuse by a public school employee from 1991 to 2000—a single decade."

A federal report estimated that in the state of California, "422,000 California public-school students would be victims before graduation".

The United States Department of Education withheld US$4 million from Chicago Public Schools "for what federal officials say is a failure to protect students from sexual abuse."

=== Zimbabwe ===
In Zimbabwe, a 2001 study found that 70% of the time, Sexual intercourse through physical abuse was present by teacher perpetrators in primary schools, with 98% of the victims being females.

This study investigated the prevalence of child sexual abuse among day secondary school pupils in Gweru, Zimbabwe. The sample comprised 268 secondary pupils (50% female; mean age=15.42, standard deviation=1.376). Data were collected by administering the Child Abuse Screening Tool Children's Version (ICAST-C). The study found an overall prevalence rate of 56.3%, with no significant gender differences. Both non-contact and contact forms of sexual abuse were prevalent.

=== Nigeria ===
In May 2020, a cross sectional study was carried out among male students in secondary schools across Ibadan, Nigeria. It was reported in the study that about 18.9% of the lot was forced to watch pornographic contents, 8.1% were touched or mishandled sexually and about 54.1% were raped.

The Federal Capital Territory Administration in July 2019, dismissed 2 male teachers of a secondary school for allegedly molesting some visually impaired female students at Jabi, Abuja. It was reported that they would drug the students and lure them to hotels and carry out such deeds.

The Nigeria Journal of pediatrics also recorded that, of 1558 students that were examined, the proportion of females and males that were sexually assaulted in a secondary school in Obio/ Akpor LGA at Rivers state were 47.4% and 24.9% respectively.

== Prevention ==
Primary prevention has been identified as a priority in challenging sexual violence, but there is a lack of understanding around what primary prevention is and is not. Although increasing knowledge or awareness of sexual assault may be a feature of primary prevention, it is not a sufficient outcome. Primary prevention must also change behaviours. Some work has been done on identifying the elements required for effective primary prevention. These include comprehensiveness, community engagement, theory-driven programming, contextualised programming, and evaluation.

By 1988, prevention programs and materials with regard to school sexual abuse came into vogue. Problems associated with these, however, include "emphasizing a simple solution to a complex social problem and contributing to victim blaming."

Despite the prevalence of these prevention programs and materials, multiple studies have demonstrated that "teachers use programs spasmodically and selectively, omitting the essential concepts relating to children's rights".

== See also ==
- Campus sexual assault
- Sexual harassment in education
- Penn State child sex abuse scandal
- USA Gymnastics sex abuse scandal
- American Boychoir School
- Kirkwood School District
- School-related gender-based violence (SRGBV)
- Statutory rape
