= Muktangan =

Muktangan (मुक्तांगण) is an educational programme that works in close collaboration with the Municipal Corporation of Greater Mumbai and a number of NGOs across India. It is a Paragon Charitable Trust initiative.

Muktangan's programmes are carried out with the assistance of partners such as the Maharashtra Dyslexia Association, Ummeed Child Development and Remedial Centre, Tata Institute of Social Sciences, Nirmala Niketan, Teach for India Program, and Absolute Return for Kids' School Leaders India Programme.

== Educational philosophy ==
To evolve sustainable, replicable inclusive models of quality child-centred teacher education and school programs in partnership with marginalised communities and to advocate them to the larger system. An inclusive, empowered world in which all live in harmony with freedom of expression, respect and integrity.

== History ==
Muktangan began in March 2003 with the training of seven low-income women in Mumbai's G South Ward (Worli and Lower Parel areas) in well-researched, child-initiated, pre-school pedagogy. Due to a lack of space in the surrounding area, six classrooms were rented from the Globe Mill Passage Municipal School. Thus began Muktangan's first relationship with the Municipal Corporation of Greater Mumbai (MCGM), allowing them to observe the Muktangan curriculum and methodology.

Within a year, in response to requests from parents and the local community to continue the methodology beyond preschool, the MCGM, who were already familiar with Muktangan's effectiveness in preschool, offered their English medium school in the Globe Mill Passage Municipal School as a pilot project for Muktangan's unique methodology. Muktangan and the MCGM then formed a public-private partnership. Following the model's success, MCGM asked us Muktangan to establish six additional English medium schools in Mumbai's G South Ward. The initial three-month pre-service training programme for local women evolved into a full one-year intensive course, followed by an initial year of residency.

According to memoranda of understanding between the MCGM and Muktangan, all seven schools are raising their standards each year until they reach Std X for the SSC Board Exams – the first in 2013 and the other six in 2017. The original school will enter Standard 8 in June 2011, and the remaining six schools will enter Standard 4, covering 2000 students with an additional 300 added each year thereafter.

== Schools ==
Schools operating under Muktangan:

- Globe Mill Passage Municipal School
- Sayani Road BMC School
- G.K.Marg BMC School
- Ambedkar BMC School
- N.M.Joshi Marg BMC School
- Love Grove BMC School
