= National Curriculum Framework for Teacher Education =

Government proposal on education in India

National Curriculum Framework for Teacher Education 2009 is a Government of India draft created for proposing changes and updates required to the National Council for Teacher Education, an Indian government body set up under the National Council for Teacher Education Act, 1993 (#73, 1993) in 1995.

== History of the framework ==
The framework is an endeavour of the National Council for Teacher Education to encourage interested parties and stakeholders to give their views on the qualitative and quantitative improvements that could be achieved in educating teachers at school, graduate, post-graduate, doctoral and post-doctoral levels. A previous "curriculum framework" had been developed in 1978 by the council itself (which at that time was just a department rather than an independent body), followed by the NCERT framework for teacher education in 1988, which subsequently led to the "first curriculum framework for quality teacher education" by NCTE in 1998. This was succeeded in 2005 by mukesh devnath

== Objectives of the framework ==
The following are the proposed areas to be targeted, according to the draft framework:

- Context, Concerns and Vision of Teacher Education
- Curricular Areas of Initial Teacher Education
- Sample Redesigned Schemas of Current Teacher Education Programmes
- Evaluating The Developing Teacher
- In-Service Education and Continuous Professional Development
- Preparing Teacher Educators

The National Curriculum Framework for Teacher Education document developed from this process outlines an inspiring vision of teacher education, covering both pre-service and in-service teacher education, as well as preparation of teacher educators. The entire NCFTE document has been represented as a concept map.
