= School-related gender-based violence =

School-related gender-based violence (SRGBV) can be defined as acts or threats of sexual, physical or psychological violence happening in and around schools. This type of violence is due to gender norms and stereotypes. It can include verbal abuse, bullying, sexual abuse, harassment and other types of violence. SRGBV is widely spread around the world and is common in many societies. Millions of children and families suffer from this type of violence. Incidents related to SRGBV has been reported in all countries and regions of the world.

== Scale ==
Many governments and organizations around the world are working towards getting reliable information regarding SRGBV, as it has been proved to be an urgent matter that should be solved. Based on all the data related to SRGBV around the world collected, it is important to try to find solutions in order to tackle this problematic.

For instance, UNICEF's report Hidden in Plain Sight included the largest collection of data relating to violence against children. As aforementioned, this report proofs how physical and sexual abuse takes place at schools. The most common types of abuse include:

- Bullying, with one out of three students between the ages of 13 and 15 worldwide claiming to suffer from this type of violence.
- Sexual violence, with one in 10 girls under 20 experiencing such violence. According to the Southern and Eastern Africa Consortium for Monitoring Education Quality (SACMEQ), two out of five school directors in Southern and Eastern Africa recognize sexual harassment happened among pupils of their establishments.
- Also corporal punishment at school is considered to be a worrying type of abuse. Fifty percent of the children population in the world live in countries where protection against corporal punishment is inexistent (at the legal and at the moral level).
- Disadvantaged groups are also victims of SRGBV. It has been reported that more than 3000 schoolchildren from Uganda, out of which 24 per cent of girls between 11 and 14 years old suffering from disabilities are victims of sexual violence. 12 per cent of girls who do not suffer from disability are victims of sexual violence.
- Homophobic bullying is one of the most common forms of bullying. According to research by UNESCO, more than 60 per cent of LGBTI children in Chile, Mexico and Peru were bullied. More than 55 percent of self-identified LGBTI students in Thailand communicated they were being bullied; in the United Kingdom, over 90 per cent of secondary school students reported homophobic bullying in their schools. Several country-based examples, including New Zealand and Norway show that lesbian, gay and bisexual students are three times more likely to be bullied than heterosexual students.
- Cyber-bullying is also another issue which needs to be resolved. In the US, the majority of victims suffering from cyber-bullying encounter the same problems at school. They are also bullied within their institutions. Girls are more likely to suffer from cyber-bullying than boys (Schneider et al., 2012).

== Root causes ==
Social beliefs influence gender relations in all countries of the world. In this sense, the root of violence against children depends on social construction and how the populations behave vis-a-vis gender-related issues. Some of the root issues include:

- Gender discriminatory norms: These promote the belief according to which men are more powerful than women and that they can prove their power because they are stronger. In many societies, dominant gender norms prevail and influence people. LGBTI people, who do not follow these gender norms often suffer from violence if they do not comply with these norms. Indeed, many people often consider LGBT people as not "proper" and judge them inciting violence against this group.
- Use of violence to show power: Authority is often shaped by held beliefs that promote male domination among women. At the school level, this implies male and female teachers are more powerful that children, perpetrating the belief that teachers have power over children. Then, authority is reinforced and maintained.
- Other factors include income inequality, as it is a proof of social constraints. Moreover, social media, online grooming and trolling – also facilitate violence among children, as this spaces are difficult to track down by the police.
- Schools and the education system in general follow a specific social and structural framework. The dynamics of the education sector produce and reproduce environments potentially dangerous for children. It is the system itself which unintentionally exposes children to types of violence that might at times replicate, reinforce or recreate power dynamics followed by the society and the people belonging to this. There are several actors in society who are responsible for participating in and creating these dynamics, including policy-makers, authority figures, teachers, parents, other students and others. In order for these dynamics to change, a lot of effort is required at schools and in society in general.

== Consequences ==
Being exposed or having experienced SRGBV can have critical impacts on children's development. Especially in terms of mental and physical well-being, including children's health (HIV and early pregnancy). It has been demonstrated that victims of violence are more likely to accept aggressive types of behaviors or be violent themselves after suffering from violence. This creates a vicious circle in which violence becomes wrongly acceptable. SRGBV can have negative and long-term consequences for the future of young people, as it forges their adult personalities.

=== Physical health and health risk behaviour outcomes ===
- Injuries, including bruises, burns, fractures, gun wounds and stabbings
- Lacerations and abrasions
- Disability
- Genital-urinary symptoms
- Unwanted pregnancy
- STIs including HIV
- Eating disorders
- Substance misuse
- Risky sexual behaviour

=== Mental health outcomes ===
- Anxiety
- Depression
- Anger or hostility
- Low self-esteem
- Suicide ideation, attempts and actual suicide
- Self-harm
- Post-traumatic stress disorder (PTSD)
- Shame
- Obsessive-compulsive disorder
- Dissociation
- Loss of memory

=== Educational outcomes ===
- Lack of concentration
- Inability to study
- Falling grades
- Disruption in class
- Non-school attendance
- Dropping out of school

== Challenges of addressing SRGBV ==
Addressing SRGBV raises important challenges and is very complex. The concept is not understood by many and is considered sensitive for many. Actors from the education sector, governments and policy-makers and individuals attending schools face several challenges regarding SRGBV. These include:

=== Social cultural norms ===
Reporting on SRGBV situations is difficult since social and cultural norms do not promote this practice. Teachers, school directors and policy-makers fear promoting sensitive materials to children.

=== Gender inequality ===
Gender inequalities refer to the devaluation and discrimination of women and girls in a society. This results of giving more power to men and boys, while demeaning women and girls. A study in Ethiopia found that even though 93 percent of male students recognized violence against girls to be illegal, about 33 percent thought it is acceptable for male students to have what they want, and appeal to their charm or force to get.

=== Capacity constraints ===
Capacity constraints in education systems, are also responsible for slowing down the progress related to preventing SRGBV. One of the challenges is the training of teachers with the tools and sensitivity to teach curriculum against violence and promote gender equality. In order for real change to happen, it is necessary to introduce these new tools slowly, analyzing who is the best to communicate these elements and what skills and knowledge are needed. What's more, having enough resources will be very important to implement change.

=== Weak coordination and monitoring mechanisms ===
Another factor that limits the progress related to stopping SRGBV is weak coordination and unreliable monitoring mechanisms. These render difficult the collaboration between ministries of education, police, social services, child protection and more. This is important because if this collaboration is not fluent, it will be difficult to stop SRGBV. A renewal in the organization's cultural landscape will be needed to overcome challenges, including bureaucracy that disrupts the flow of knowledge sharing.

=== Weak service support for victims ===
Limited access to quality services, including child protection a social services among others (often absent) are due to the quality of services. This particularly concerns fragile communities.

=== Lack of governance ===
In the majority of countries, there is currently no legislation that protects children from violence at school, meaning not much can be done when it happens. However, it is the case that some countries have recently introduced legislations specifically for schools. This said, legislation related aspects have become a real challenge. As to stop SRGBV, perpetrators must be punished.

=== Limited evidence ===
Emerging, but limited, evidence base on what works, although this is an area that is receiving increasing attention. The few evaluations of SRGBV interventions that currently exist vary greatly in methodology, rigour, scale and scope. This makes it difficult to identify best practice and draw conclusions about effective strategies that can be transferred to other settings. There is also a growing body of promising practices and existing knowledge that has not yet been fully documented.

=== Insufficient data and research ===
As previously mentioned, many challenges slow down the reporting and impact on the quality of providing reliable data regarding certain types of violence. This implies data is incomplete in contexts such as sexual orientation, race/ethnicity, and disability among others. This is important as all of these contexts are important to fight against SRGBV. According to a recent study by USAID, to tackle SRGBV it is necessary to rely on large-scale studies which include findings that can be compared across countries; studies showing different forms of SRGBV, connections between behavior change and a discrepancy between research and practice. It is necessary to invest in strong data management system tools which divide data and will make it easier for people to analyze it.

== See also ==
- Campus sexual assault
- Education sector responses to LGBT violence
- Gender inequality in curricula
- School bullying
- School violence
- School-related gender-based violence in Vietnam
- Sexual harassment in education
- Violence against men
- Violence against women
