= XSEED Education =

- Type: Private company
- Industry: Education
- Founded: 2014
- Founder: Ashish Rajpal
- Headquarters: Singapore,
- Products: The XSEED Method, The XSEED School Program, Learnometer, XSEED MAX, Report Bee
- Number of employees: 100 (2023–24)
- Website: xseededucation.com

XSEED Education is a Singapore-based education company founded by Ashish Rajpal. It runs the XSEED program for teaching and learning.

The XSEED program is an integrated curriculum, teacher training, and assessment tool for K-8 school and out-of-school education. XSEED replaces a knowledge-transmission or "teaching as telling" approach with an inquiry-based, constructivist approach that uses hands-on activities, followed by reflection and feedback. It also emphasizes rigor through practice and assessments.

The XSEED program has reached close to 2 million students across several countries. XSEED Education has acquired two technology companies, Pleolabs (2015) and Report Bee (2018).

== Overview ==
The XSEED Method was invented by Ashish Rajpal, an alumnus of the Harvard Graduate School of Education. The XSEED school program content was then developed with a team that included alumni from Harvard, Cambridge, MIT, and IIM Ahmedabad. The program includes a detailed micro-curriculum, training for teachers, assessment tools, and digital learning resources for students.

The XSEED program aligns with existing international standards and the syllabus of various boards, including the US Core, Singapore, India (CBSE, ICSE, State Boards), and the Philippines (K-12 standards of the Department of Education).

The XSEED Method has been implemented by 3,000 schools across India, the Philippines, Dubai, Riyadh, Qatar, Nepal, and Oman. XSEED has also partnered with the Royal Education Council in Bhutan.
