= National Council for Teacher Education Act, 1993 =

The National Council for Teacher Education Act, 1993 is an Act of the Parliament of India which gave statutory recognition to the National Council for Teacher Education. and subsequently passed.

== Objective ==
The objective of the bill, according to the government, was to "provide for the establishment of a National Council for Teacher Education" as a separate body rather than as just an advisory department, a role the council had held since its inception in 1976.
