= Education sector responses to LGBTQ violence =

Education sector responses to LGBT violence addresses the ways in which education systems work to create safe learning environments for LGBT students. Overall, education sector responses tend to focus on homophobia and violence linked to sexual orientation and gender identity/expression, and less on transphobia. Most responses focus in some way on diverse expressions of gender and support students to understand that gender may be expressed in a different way from binary models (of masculine and feminine). Responses vary greatly in their scope (from a single class to the national level); duration (from one-off events to several years); and level of support that they enjoy (from individual teachers to the highest levels of government).

A comprehensive education sector response to homophobic and transphobic violence encompasses all of the following elements: effective policies, relevant curricula and learning materials, training and support for staff, support for students and families information and strategic partnerships, and monitoring and evaluation. This type of approach could also be applied in the form of Gay-Straight Alliances (GSA's). GSAs are “student-led clubs open to youth of all sexual orientations with the purpose of supporting sexual minority students and their heterosexual allies and also reducing prejudice, discrimination, and harassment within the school. Multiple studies have found evidence to support that GSAs are capable of reducing violence, bullying, aggression, and suicide attempts within the student population as a whole, but had the most pronounced effects on LGBT-identified students.

Very few countries have education sector policies that address homophobic and transphobic violence or include sexual orientation and gender identity/expression in curricula or learning materials. In most countries, staff lack training and support to address sexual orientation and gender identity/expression and to prevent and respond to homophobic and transphobic violence. Although many countries provide support for students who experience violence, services are often ill-equipped to deal with homophobic and transphobic violence. Few countries collect data on the nature, prevalence or impact of homophobic and transphobic violence, which contributes to low awareness of the problem and lack of evidence for planning effective responses.

In general terms, the range of responses to homophobic and transphobic violence in educational settings appears to correlate to a country's: socio-cultural context (in terms of the society's beliefs and attitudes towards sexual and gender diversity, as well as to human rights and gender equality); and legal context (in terms of the rights of LGBTI individuals and the situation of human rights in general).

== Policy approaches ==
Few countries have developed education sector policies to prevent and address homophobic and transphobic violence in schools, reflecting the fact that recognition of the prevalence and harmful impact of such violence in the sector is a relatively recent development. Most countries that have developed policies have taken one of the two following approaches:

- Integrating references to sexual orientation and gender identity or to homophobic and transphobic discrimination and violence into existing education sector policies on general violence, bullying or discrimination.
- Developing specific education sector policies that focus on violence and discrimination based on sexual orientation and gender identity/expression.

The first approach aims to protect and support LGBTI students by mainstreaming issues related to sexual orientation and gender identity into broader policies to prevent and address discrimination and violence. However, available data suggest that in countries where policies do not clearly refer to homophobic and transphobic violence, this form of violence may not be addressed by schools. For example, a large-scale qualitative research study conducted in 19 European countries in 2013 by the European Union Fundamental Rights Agency concluded that: 'Where anti-bullying measures are in place, these are often generic and they may be ineffective in dealing specifically with bullying on the grounds of sexual orientation and gender identity. The second approach requires political leadership and a legal environment that is conducive to the protection of the rights of LGBTI people. A number of countries have developed specific education sector policies that address homophobic and transphobic violence in schools and other educational settings.

Work conducted in countering violence in schools, in general, has shown that 'school and system-wide interventions', often referred to as 'whole school' strategies or approaches, are particularly effective. The same applies to education sector responses to homophobic and transphobic violence. In this report, 'whole school' responses to homophobic and transphobic violence are also referred to as 'comprehensive' education sector responses, which can also be referred to as 'holistic', 'systematic', 'systemic', 'system-wide'. These types of approaches are usually most effective when they are implemented within the scope of interacting with the community as a whole. Through a systematic approach, the intended impact is not strictly limited to campus grounds but permeates the barriers between the school and its surrounding populace. Often, aggression and violence does not occur in isolated instances, but rather occurs as a product of the school's negative climate which may endorse or even encourage bullying and/or aggression. Reviews of existing programs that encompass the participation of the students, teachers, and community as a whole have demonstrated their ability in preventing and reducing suicide attempts and peer-to-peer aggression.

== National policies ==
Progress in implementing measures to prevent and address homophobic and transphobic violence in educational settings varies between regions and countries. The most comprehensive initiatives are being implemented in Australia and New Zealand, Canada and the United States, and a number of countries in Europe, Asia and Latin America. However, the education sector response has been limited in the majority of countries in the world, particularly in Africa, the Caribbean, the Middle East, Central Asia and some areas of the Pacific. In addition, many countries do not have comprehensive strategies to prevent and address violence in schools in general.

National legislation against discrimination (as a whole) has served as a basis to develop national policies – which either include, or are specific to, the education sector – that address discrimination on the grounds of sexual orientation and gender identity/expression. In general, the education sector tends to address homophobic and transphobic violence through wider policies on violence, such as those related to bullying in schools or safe schools.

=== Asia ===
In Asia, the Philippines is the only country to include specific references to violence on the basis of sexual orientation and gender identity/expression in a national law (2013). In Japan, in 2015, the Ministry of Education issued landmark guidance urging local education boards to ensure that schools cater to the needs of LGBT students. At a more local level, the 2004 Gender Equity Education Act in Taiwan of China seeks to eliminate gender stereotypes from the curriculum and prohibits discrimination on the basis of sexual orientation in schools. However, a regional report developed for this review notes that implementation measures for this Act may be inadequate to effectively prevent and address discrimination.

All other countries in the Asia region, apart from Pakistan, have legal or policy frameworks to address violence in educational institutions or the health of minors, although they vary in their nature and jurisdiction. In India, following a 2014 ruling by the Supreme Court recognizing the status of Hijras, the University Grants Commission called on all universities to recognize transgender students and to include a transgender category on all application forms, academic testimonials and official documents.

=== North America ===
In 2002, the Supreme Court of Canada ruled that LGBT students and same-sex parents had the right to be safe from discrimination and to see their lives reflected in the school curriculum. In 2005, it ruled that school districts were 'liable for the discriminatory conduct of the students who harassed' and that they had a duty to provide students with 'an educational environment that does not expose them to discriminatory harassment'. The Ontario Education Act of Canada was amended in 2012 to specifically integrate attention to homophobic bullying following several years of amendments to Safe School legislation. The Act strengthened legal obligations for school boards to foster positive school environments and to prevent and address inappropriate student behaviour, including homophobic or transphobic violence. For example, principals must suspend students and consider expulsion for misbehaviour that is motivated by bias, prejudice or hatred, including that which is based on gender, sexual orientation or gender identity/expression. School boards must provide support for victims of bullying, witnesses and perpetrators. In Quebec, legislation was adopted in 2012 for schools to provide healthy and safe learning environments, allowing every student to develop their full potential regardless of their sexual orientation or gender identity/expression.

In the United States, LGBT students are not protected under federal legislation. However, in 2010, the Department of Education issued guidance to specify that federal provisions outlawing discrimination on the basis of sex in education (Title IX) also offered some protection against bullying on the basis of sexual orientation. In 2014, it extended this protection on the grounds of gender identity. The Department of Justice also clarified that transgender students must be allowed to use restrooms that correspond to their gender identity and that failure to do so amounts to sex discrimination under Title IX. In May 2016, the Department of Education released Examples of Policies and Emerging Practices for Supporting Transgender Students. The document has a list of questions and answers for schools and educators concerning Student transitions, Privacy, Confidentiality, and Student Records, Sex-Segregated Activities and Facilities, Additional Practices to Support Transgender Students, Terminology, Cited Policies on Transgender Students, and Select Federal Resources on Transgender Students. On February 22, 2017, the U.S. Department of Education withdrew statements of support and guidance previously issued in the Letter to Emily Prince from James A. Ferg-Cadima, Acting Deputy Assistant Secretary for Policy, Office for Civil Rights at the Department of Education dated January 7, 2015 and the Dear Colleague Letter on Transgender Students jointly issued by the Civil Rights Division of the Department of Justice and the Department of Education dated May 13, 2016.

=== Latin America ===
In Latin America and the Caribbean, Argentina is the only country that offers a full normative framework to tackle sexual orientation and gender identity/expression issues in educational contexts through the National Law on Integral Sexuality Education (2006) (26.150), the National Law on Education (2006) (26.206), the National Law for the Promotion of Coexistence and Tackling Social Conflict in Educational Institutions (2013) (26.892) and a federal guide for educational responses for addressing challenging situations linked to school life. The guide also contains a specific section on discrimination and harassment due to sexual orientation or gender identity/expression.

In 2015, the Constitutional Court of Colombia and the Supreme Court of Mexico found that bullying undermined victims' dignity, integrity and education and that the education sector had a direct duty to protect students from violence based on their personal characteristics.

In Uruguay, the General Law on Education (2014) includes a general reference to non-discrimination due to sexual orientation. In El Salvador, the General Law on Youth, while not referring to sexual orientation and gender identity/expression, recognizes and guarantees the right to integral comprehensive sexuality education (2013). Also, the General Law on Education's article 5-A condemns inequalities and discriminatory practices between or towards students when based on traditional gendered roles (1990).

Other countries have instruments to prevent and counter discrimination or violence, including bullying. Examples include the following:

In Chile, Law 20.609 (2012) and the Law on Education (2009) are in place to counter discrimination in general and can also be applied to a school setting. However, as none of the laws are LGBT-specific, addressing homophobic and transphobic violence is left at the discretion of individual schools.

In Colombia, no specific policy exists to tackle homophobic and transphobic violence. Law 1620 (from 2013) and the Regulatory Decree (1965) establish minimal norms for applying the Integral Roadmap for Educational Community Living and its protocols, in order to prevent and mitigate situations affecting school community living and the exercising of human, sexual and reproductive rights.

In Honduras, the Law Against Bullying was adopted in 2014. However, it does not refer to particular motives for bullying.

In Peru, the General Law on Education (2003) establishes that integral sexuality education is part of the right to education. A Law promoting violence-free community living in educational institutions (29719) exists (2011), although it does not refer to homophobic or transphobic violence.

Cuba, El Salvador, and Peru guarantee the right to comprehensive sexuality education, which should cover issues related to sexual orientation and gender identity/expression.

As with other regions of the world, although these rights-based policies are on the statute books in countries in Latin America and the Caribbean, a regional survey of 19 states – conducted by the Inter-American Institute for Human Rights in 2011 – noted that, in the majority of cases, they are not rigorously implemented and are 'always very general, dispersed, and in some cases ambiguous'.

=== Europe ===
In Europe, some countries have specific laws and policies to address homophobic and transphobic violence in educational settings. In Belgium, the Flemish Ministry for Education and Equal Opportunities issued a Common Declaration for a Gender-Sensitive and LGBT Friendly Policy in Schools in 2012, establishing a framework for sexuality education and providing guidelines for schools to develop LGBT-inclusive policies.

In France, although no national policy mentions homophobic and transphobic violence, the Ministry of Education's annual letter to principals has, since 2009, mentioned combating homophobia. Also, a 2012 governmental plan to combat homophobic and transphobic violence foresees specific actions in the education sector. In Portugal, the Students' Statute (2012) includes protection against discrimination based on both sexual orientation and gender identity/expression. In Sweden, the Discrimination Act (2009) explicitly bans discrimination on the basis of sexual orientation and gender identity/expression in education and obliges pre-schools, schools, and universities to take proactive measures against violence. The United Kingdom's Equality Act (2010) makes it a duty for schools to advance equality for their LGBT students. The Act explicitly mentions sexual orientation and gender reassignment and mandates that every school should have a behavior policy preventing all forms of bullying.

In Turkey, there is very little in terms of representation for its LGBT communities within an educational context, often resulting in educational staff and students alike fearful of the consequences of coming out. The limited number of LGBTs in education, employment, and health care can be explained with reference to structural barriers against the coming out of LGBT individuals both to their peers at school and work.

=== The Pacific ===
In the Pacific, Australia's 2013 Sex Discrimination Act (Sexual Orientation, Gender Identity and Intersex Status) builds on previous state-level legislation and provides protections against discrimination on the basis of sexual orientation, gender identity/expression and intersex status (although some exemptions exist for some religious schools). Also in Australia, the State of Victoria's Department of Education and Early Childhood Development provides guidance to support sexual diversity in schools.

In Fiji, the 2015 Policy on Child Protection in Schools requires schools to respect children's sexual orientation and to take action against bullying, including homophobic bullying. In New Zealand, the Ministry of Education published a Guide for Sexuality Education (2015) stating that school anti-bullying procedures should directly address bullying related to sexual orientation and gender identity/expression and that these incidents should be recorded as such and monitored. The comprehensive guidance also touches upon the curriculum, school uniforms, restroom facilities, procedures and policies in sports and extra-curricular activities.

Other countries in the region offer limited protection from school-related violence. Papua New Guinea alone specifically forbids such practice, while other countries protect children's health in general or offer only limited protection to children (in Tonga).

=== Africa ===
In Africa, a review of policies on gender, diversity and violence in schools in Botswana, Lesotho, Namibia, South Africa and Swaziland – conducted within the study supported by UNESCO in 2015 – found that countries have generic legal and policy frameworks (including in education) that provide a conducive environment to address violence in schools. In Lesotho and Swaziland, they are mostly related to child protection. Swaziland has an education sector policy where Schools as Centres of Care and Support (SCCS) are supposed to be 'protective and secure environments that accommodate all learners'. In Botswana and Namibia, Education for All National Action Plans and other education policies clearly mention inclusive and non-discriminatory education. However, none of these policies make reference to sexual and gender diversity, except for South Africa. Only South Africa has explicit policies to deal with homophobic bullying in education. The UNESCO-supported study found that, in interview, national policy-makers in Southern Africa suggest that the overall absence of specific policies may reflect the lack of reliable evidence on the nature, prevalence and impact of homophobic and transphobic violence in educational settings in the region, or that it is not considered a political priority. Where specific national legislation or policies (including in the education sector) are lacking, other entry points may exist to address homophobic and transphobic violence in educational institutions. These include international or regional human rights frameworks, but also general laws and policies against violence in educational institutions (for which additional guidance can be produced to detail how they apply to homophobic and transphobic violence). Finally, national anti-discrimination laws in Southern Africa (whether or not they mention sexual orientation and gender identity/expression) may also provide good entry points for the education sector to consider adopting new policies or upgrading existing ones.

== Relevant curricula and learning materials ==
The second element of a comprehensive response to homophobic and transphobic violence in educational settings is relevant curricula and learning materials. Through their content and the way that they are delivered, curricula, learning materials and extra-curricular activities in educational settings – such as sports or theatre – convey influential messages about 'normality', legitimacy and power. Curricula are never neutral. Those that do not feature sexual and gender diversity convey the implicit message that people with diverse sexual orientations and gender identities/expressions are not part of society. Worse still, some curricula may explicitly convey negative messages about LGBTI people.

Curricula generally take one of four approaches for sexual and gender diversity:

- 'Hostile' curricula: i.e. they explicitly convey negative messages about LGBTI people, which reinforce negative gender stereotypes and contribute to homophobic and transphobic violence. For example, textbooks were withdrawn by the government in Croatia (in 2009) and Macedonia (in 2010) because they described homosexuality as a disease.
- 'Non-inclusive' curricula: These omit any representation of sexual and gender diversity in their materials and, for example, ignore these aspects when discussing historical figures who were LGBTI. This has the result of rendering LGBTI people 'invisible'. Most curricula worldwide fall into this category.
- 'Inclusive' curricula: These convey implicit positive messages about sexual and gender diversity when they promote the human rights of all, regardless of personal characteristics including sexual orientation and gender identity/expression. These curricula are likely to also encourage gender equality.
- 'Affirming' curricula: These convey explicit positive messages about sexual and gender diversity by featuring positive representations of LGBTI people and explicitly affirming their equality in dignity and rights. They provide educators with clear guidelines and examples on how to refer to sexual orientation and gender identity/expression in a sensitive way.

Hostile and non-inclusive curricula tend to exist in contexts where homophobia and transphobia are widespread. They do nothing to prevent or reduce violence based on sexual orientation and gender identity/expression. On the contrary, hostile curricula contribute to reinforcing stereotypical and patriarchal views of gender – directly leading to homophobic and transphobic violence. Meanwhile, by not challenging these stereotypical and patriarchal views, non-inclusive curricula also contribute to homophobic and transphobic violence in educational institutions. In contrast, inclusive or affirming curricula may discuss definitions of masculinity and femininity and challenge existing stereotypes about gender and sexuality – contributing to increasing LGBTI students' feeling of belonging and safety.

Research suggests that curricula featuring sexual orientation and gender identity/expression positively impact students' and teachers' beliefs and attitudes, encouraging critical thinking and increasing feelings of safety at school. They also help to address violence. The literature confirms that challenging homophobia and transphobia in education is most effective when LGBTI issues are reflected and featured through teaching and lesson plans, and when LGBTI people are positively portrayed across the curriculum. However, it has been observed that teachers are generally limited in their knowledge of this particular subject.

== Sources ==
This article incorporates text from a free content work. Licensed under CC-BY-SA IGO 3.0 (license statement/permission). Text taken from Out in the Open: Education sector responses to violence based on sexual orientation and gender identity/expression, 15, 61-62, 65, 69-75, 82-83, UNESCO, UNESCO. UNESCO.
