= National Council for Teacher Education =

Government body for controlling Indian education system

- Abbreviation: NCTE
- Formation: 1995; 31 years ago
- Headquarters: New Delhi
- Location: G-7, Sector-10, Dwarka, Landmark – Near Metro Station, New Delhi – 110075 India
- Chairperson: Pankaj Arora
- Main organ: Council
- Affiliations: Department of Higher Education, Ministry of Education
- Website: ncte.gov.in

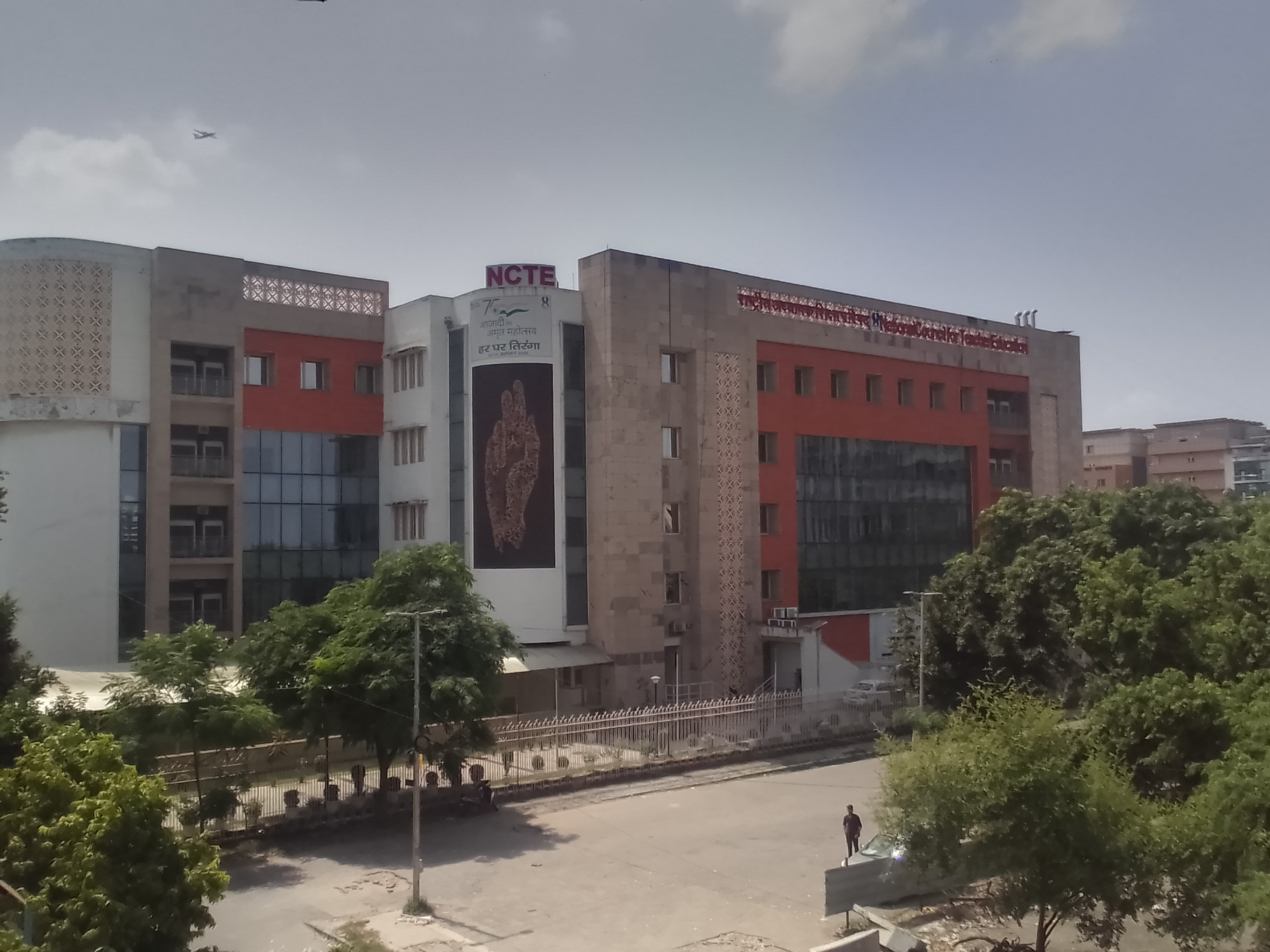
NCTE building at Sector 10, Dwarka

National Council for Teacher Education (NCTE) is a statutory body of Indian government set-up under the National Council for Teacher Education Act, 1993 (#73, 1993) in 1995 to formally oversee standards, procedures and processes in the Indian education system. This council functions for the central as well as state governments on all matter with regard to the Teacher Education and its secretariat is located in the Department of Teacher Education and National Council of Educational Research and Training (NCERT). Despite the successful functioning in terms of educational field, it is facing difficulties in ensuring the maintenance of the standards of teacher education and preventing the increase in the number of substandard teacher education institutions in the country.

== History ==
Before 1995, the NCTE had existed since 1973 as a government advisory body (and not as a separate institution) to look after development and progress of "teacher education". The NCTE was then only a department of the National Council of Educational Research and Training. As per the NCTE's own admission, it failed in its objective of overlooking and, to an extent, regularising norms and processes in teachers' education in India because of lack of formal jurisdiction. To that effect, the National Policy on Education, 1986 allowed setting up of a government-authorised institution with formal powers.

== Objectives Planning ==
- To achieve planned and coordinated development of teacher education system throughout the country.
- To regulate and properly maintain the Norms and Standards in the teacher education system and for matters connected therewith.
- It aims at training individuals for equipping them to teach pre-primary, primary, secondary and senior secondary stages in schools, non-formal and part-time education, adult education (correspondence) and distance education courses.

== Functions And Management ==
- undertake surveys and studies pertaining to all aspects of the teacher education and publish the corresponding results.
- For the preparation of suitable plans and programmes regarding the field of teacher education, it makes recommendations to both the state and central governments, universities, University Grants Common (UGC), and other recognised institutions.
- it co-ordinates and monitors the teacher education system throughout the country.
- it lays down the guideline for the minimum qualifications need for an individual to be a teacher in schools and recognised institutions.
- it lays downs guidelines for the provision of physical and infrastructural facilities, staffing pattern etc. for the compliance by recognised ions.
- it lays down standards with respect to examinations, the major criteria for such admission as well as schemes for courses or training.
- it promotes and conducts research and innovation in schools and recognised institutions and then disseminate the results thereof.
- it examines its own laid-down guidelines, norms and standards for the improvement.
- it identifies the recognised institutions and set up new institutions for the developmental programmes of teacher education system.
- it takes up necessary steps for the prevention of the commercialisation of teacher education.
- it also performs other function that are entrusted to it by the central government.

== Programmes Recognised ==
- Diploma in early childhood education programme leading to Diploma in Pre-school Education (DPSE).
- Elementary teacher education programmes leading to Diploma in Elementary Education (D.EI.ED).
- Bachelor of Elementary Education programme leading to Bachelor of Elementary Education (B.EI.ED) degree.
- Bachelor of Education programme leading to bachelore of education (B.Ed) degree.
- Master of Education programme leading to Master of Education (M.Ed) degree.
- Diploma in Physical Education programmes leading to Diploma in Physical Education (D.P.Ed).
- Bachelor of Physical Education programmes leading to Bachelor of Physical Education (B.P.Ed) degree.
- Master of Physical Education programmes leading to Master of Physical Education (M.P.Ed) degree.
- Diploma in elementary education programmes through open and distance learning system leading to Diploma in Elementary Education (D.EI.Ed).
- Bachelor of Education programmes through open and distance learning system leading to Bachelor of Education (B.Ed) degree.
- Diploma in Arts Education (Visual Arts) programme leading to Diploma in Arts Education (Visual Arts).
- Diploma in Arts Education (Performing Arts) programme leading to Diploma in Arts Education (Performing Arts).
- 4-yr integrated programme leading to B.A.B.Ed/B.Sc.B.Ed Degree.
- Bachelor of Education Programme 3-yr (part-time) leading to Bachelor of Education (B.Ed) degree.
- 3-yr integrated programme leading to B.Ed.M.Ed. (Integrated) degree.

== Division ==
It relates to different academic activities pertaining to the teacher education programmes. It provides leadership and coordinates different types.

- Objectives:

- Coordinate the academic activities on teacher education. - Develop curriculum frameworks and model syllabi. - Prepare guidelines for conducting academic activities in teacher education institutions (TEIs). - Conduct research in the field of teacher education. - Provide resource support in the field of teacher education. - Develop database on various aspects pertaining to the teacher education.

== Current scope ==
NCTE forms an extremely critical structure of the Indian government's National Curriculum Framework for Teacher Education 2009, and has been the organisation that developed the 2009 draft of the same framework.

As of 2007, the NCTE has its headquarters in New Delhi apart from regional representations in many other cities. Four official 'Regional Committees' of NCTE operate from Jaipur, Bangalore, Bhubaneswar and Bhopal handling the Northern, Southern, Eastern and Western regions respectively. The councils are responsible for recognising 'teacher training institutions'. It is reported that as on 1 January 2007, "7461 teacher training institutions offering 9045 courses have been recognised by NCTE with an approved intake of 7.72 lakh teacher trainees." NCTE completed and recognized the revised Regulations 2014. Such includes:

- Establishment of Teacher Education in Composite institutions that consists of multi-disciplinary or multi teacher education programmes.
- Each programme curriculum gives importance to Yoga Education, ICT, Inclusive education etc.
- Open and Distance Learning (ODL) has developed and improved in performance due to in-built quality assurance mechanisms.

== Right to Education ==
The Ministry of Education (MoE), Deptt. of School Education and Literacy has authorized National Council of Educational Research & Training to lay down the curriculum and evaluation procedure for elementary education and to develop framework of national curriculum under a clause of Sub-Section 6 of Section 7 of the Act via its Gazette Notification
